= Chinese Filipinos =

Ethnic group

咱儂 / 咱人 / 華菲人 Chinoy / Tsinoy / Lannang
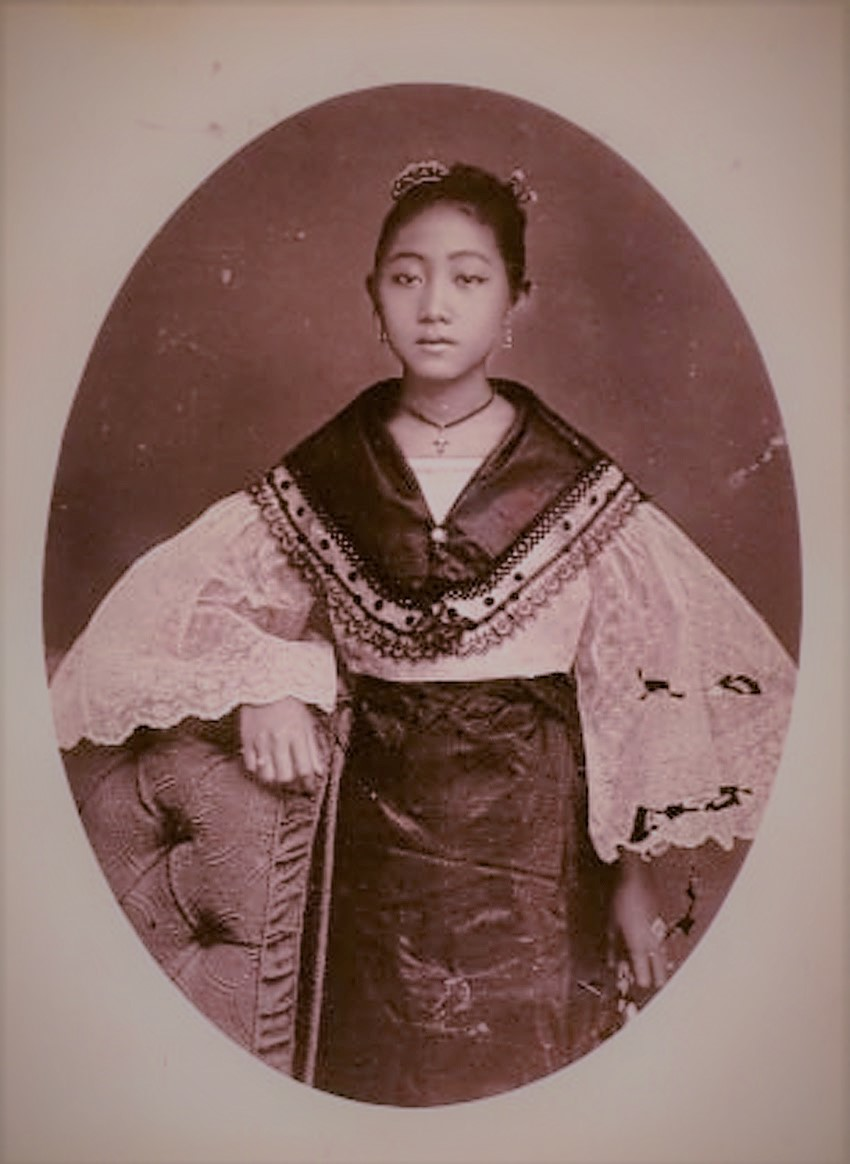
- A Filipina Chinese maiden wearing the Maria Clara gown called Traje de Mestiza, dated November 4, 1913.

Total population
- Ethnic or pure Chinese : 1.35 million (as of 2013, according to the Senate); Filipinos with Chinese descent : 22.8 million (as of 2013, according to the Senate)

Regions with significant populations
- Metro Manila, Metro Cebu, Metro Davao, Cagayan de Oro, Iloilo, Bacolod, Iligan, Pangasinan, Pampanga, Tarlac, Laoag, Laguna, Rizal, Zamboanga, and Bicol.

Languages
- Primary: Hokkien (overwhelmingly); Cantonese and several other varieties of Chinese (sizable community); Mandarin (working and trade language) Regional: Cebuano, Ilocano, Hiligaynon, Waray, Bikol, Kapampangan, Pangasinan, and other languages of the Philippines Secondary: Filipino, Hokaglish, and English

Religion
- Predominantly: Christianity (Roman Catholicism, Protestantism, P.I.C, and Iglesia ni Cristo); Minority: Mahayana Buddhism, Taoism, Mazuism, Traditional Chinese Folk Religion, Islam, Irreligious

Related ethnic groups
- Sangley, Mestizo de Sangley; Overseas Chinese, Chinese Singaporeans, Chinese Indonesians, Chinese Malaysians, Han Taiwanese, Thai Chinese, Han Chinese.

Chinese Filipinos
- Traditional Chinese: 咱儂
- Simplified Chinese: 咱人
- Hokkien POJ: Lán-nâng / Nán-nâng / Lán-lâng
Transcriptions
Southern Min
- Hokkien POJ: Lán-nâng / Nán-nâng / Lán-lâng
- Tâi-lô: Lán-nâng / Nán-nâng / Lán-lâng

Chinese Filipinos
- Traditional Chinese: 華菲人
- Simplified Chinese: 华菲人
- Wade–Giles: Hua^{2}-fei^{1}-jen^{2}
- Hanyu Pinyin: Huáfēirén
Transcriptions
Standard Mandarin
- Hanyu Pinyin: Huáfēirén
- Bopomofo: ㄏㄨㄚˊ ㄈㄟ ㄖㄣˊ
- Wade–Giles: Hua^{2}-fei^{1}-jen^{2}
- Tongyong Pinyin: Huá-fei-rén
- IPA: [xwǎ.féɪ.ɻə̌n]
Yue: Cantonese
- Yale Romanization: Wàh fēi yàhn
- Jyutping: Waa4 fei1 jan4
- Canton Romanization: Wa⁴ féi¹ yen⁴
- IPA: [wa˩ fej˥ jɐn˩]
Southern Min
- Hokkien POJ: Hôa-hui-lîn
- Tâi-lô: Huâ-hui-lîn

Chinese Filipinos (Note: Chinoy; Tagalog: Tsinoy, [tʃɪnoɪ] / Tsinong Pilipino, [tʃɪno]; Philippine Hokkien Chinese: 咱儂 / 咱人 / 菲律賓華僑; Pe̍h-ōe-jī: Lán-nâng / Lán-lâng / Nán-nâng / Hui-li̍p-pin Hôa-kiâu, Mandarin simplified Chinese: 菲律宾华人 / 菲律宾华侨 / 华菲人; traditional Chinese: 菲律賓華人 / 菲律賓華僑 / 華菲人; pinyin: Fēilǜbīn huárén / Fēilǜbīn huáqiáo / Huáfēi rén) (sometimes referred as Filipino Chinese or Chinoy/Tsinoy in the Philippines) are Filipinos of full or partial Chinese descent, although typically born and raised in the Philippines. A large proportion of Chinese Filipinos can trace their ancestry back to the Chinese province of Fujian.

Chinese immigration to the Philippines predates the Spanish colonization of the islands, but intensified between the 16th and 19th centuries, attracted by the lucrative trade of the Manila galleons. During this era, they were referred to as Sangley. These were mostly Hokkien-speaking people that later became the dominant group within the Filipino Chinese community. In the 19th century, migration was triggered by the corrupt and ineffective governance of the late Qing dynasty, combined with economic problems in China due to the Western and Japanese colonial wars as well as the Opium Wars. It subsequently continued during the 20th century, from American colonial times, through the post-independence era and the Cold War, to the present. In 2013, according to older records held by the Senate of the Philippines, there were approximately 1.35 million ethnic (or pure) Chinese within the Philippine population, while Filipinos with any Chinese descent comprised 22.8 million of the population. However, current figures are not known since the Philippine census usually does not take into account questions about ethnicity. The oldest Chinatown in the world is located in Binondo, Manila, founded on December 8, 1594.

Chinese Filipinos are a well-established middle class ethnic group and are represented in all of the levels of Filipino society. Chinese Filipinos also play a leading role in the Philippine business sector and dominate the Philippine economy today. Most in the current list of the Philippines' richest each year comprise Taipan billionaires of Chinese Filipino background. Some in the list of the political families in the Philippines are also of Chinese Filipino background, meanwhile the bulk are of Spanish colonial-era Chinese mestizo (mestizo de Sangley) descent, of which, many families of such background also compose a considerable part of the Philippine population especially its bourgeois, who during the late Spanish Colonial Era in the late 19th century, produced a major part of the ilustrado intelligentsia of the late Spanish Colonial Philippines, that were very influential in the creation of Filipino nationalism and the sparking of the Philippine Revolution as part of the foundation of the First Philippine Republic and subsequently sovereign independent Philippines.

== Identity ==
The organization Kaisa para sa Kaunlaran (Unity for Progress) omits the hyphen for the term Chinese Filipino, as the term is a noun. The Chicago Manual of Style and the APA, among others, also omits the hyphen. When used as an adjective as a whole, it may take on a hyphenated form or may remain unchanged.

By the definition of "people with one Chinese parent", the ethnically Chinese Filipino comprise 1.8% (1.35 million) of the population.

== History ==
=== Early interactions ===
The Han Chinese sailed around the Philippines from the 9th century onward and frequently interacted with the local Austronesian people. The Han that sailed to the Philippines were mostly Hokkien-speaking people. Chinese and Austronesian interactions initially commenced as bartering and items. This is evidenced by a collection of Chinese artifacts found throughout Philippine waters, dating back to the 10th century. Since the Song dynasty in China and precolonial times in the Philippines, evidence of trade contact can already be observed in the Chinese ceramics found in archaeological sites, like in Santa Ana, Manila.

Chinese (Sangley) in Precolonial/Early Spanish Philippines, c. 1590 via Boxer Codex

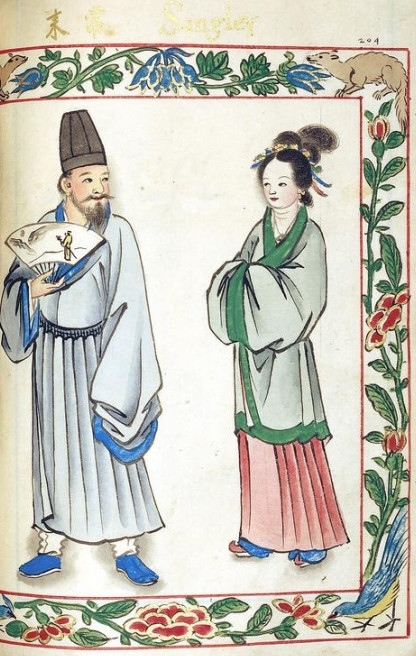
Chinese (Sangley) Couple Migrants in the Philippines, c. 1590

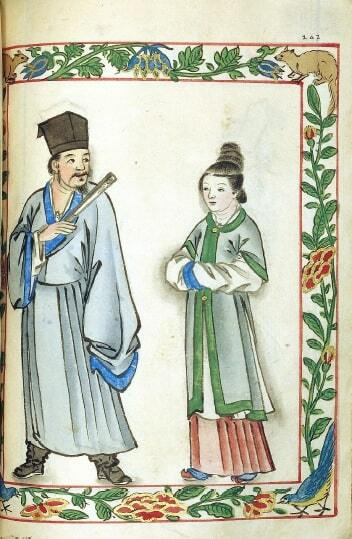
Chinese (Sangley) Couple Migrants in the Philippines, c. 1590

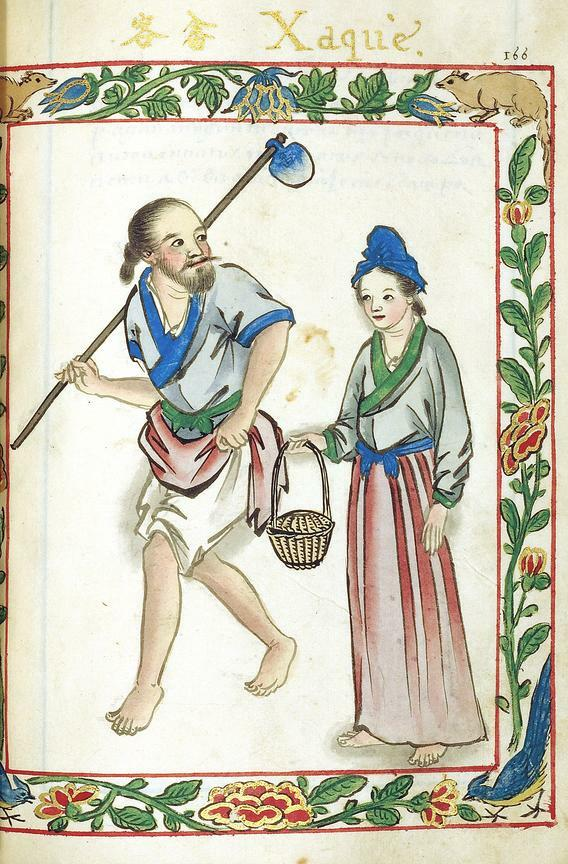
She couple from Ming Dynasty China

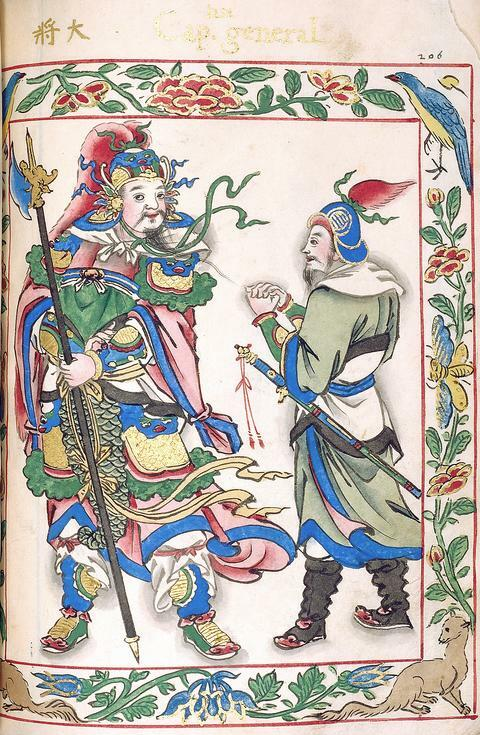
Ming dynasty Chinese General with Attendant, c. 1590

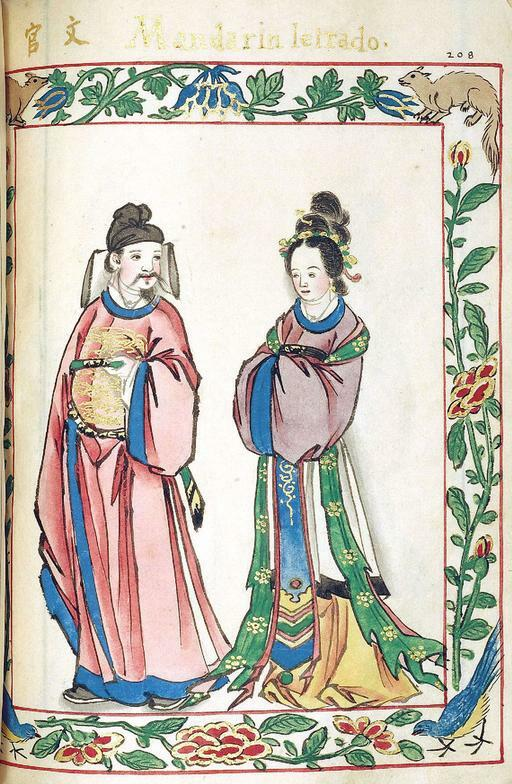
Mandarin Bureaucrat with Wife from Ming dynasty, c. 1590

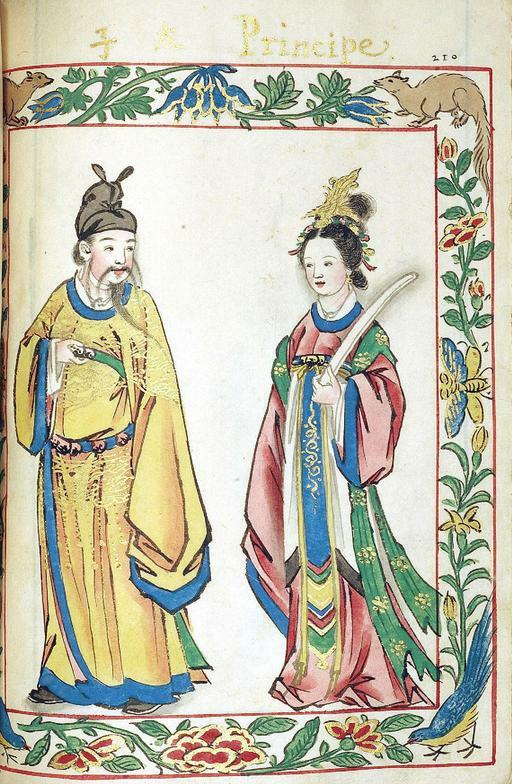
Chinese nobility from Ming Dynasty China, c. 1590

In the year 972 AD, the Song dynasty annals briefly mentioned Ma-i ("麻逸", Pe̍h-ōe-jī: Mâ-i̍t), which is generally accepted to be located in Mindoro island, southwest of Manila. A year earlier, the annals recorded traders from Ma-i coming to Canton, and then in 982 AD. In the 11th century, the states—or chief settlements—recorded by the local Bureau of Maritime Trade are Butuan, written in records as "蒲端" (Pô͘-toan) and Sanmalan recorded as "三麻蘭" (Sam-mâ-lân), whose traders presented themselves as tribute-paying envoys to China. They continued trade with the Song court in the years 1004, 1007 and 1011 and brought home Chinese ceramics. A century later, in addition to Ma-i, the bureau then recorded other states from the Philippines Baipuer (Babuyan Islands) and the group of islands collectively known as "Sandao" or "Sanyu" which were Jamayan (now Calamian, recorded as "加麻延" (Ka-mâ-iân)), Balaoyu (Palawan, or "巴姥酉", Pa-ló-iú)), and Pulihuan (approximate location is Manila, or areas near it, recorded as "蒲裏喚", Pô͘-lí-hoàn). These native traders mostly belonged to the elite. In a Song dynasty record, a man from Sandao was treated with respect after he returned home from Quanzhou for a unique tradition seemed to stem from the native's village that a man who had been to China was revered. In 1007 AD, a local chief from Butuan sent an envoy to China, requesting an equal status with Champa, however, this was rejected for the Song court appear to have favored Champa.

If indeed there was interaction in the Visayas archipelago, it was sporadic. While there is evidence that the Chinese had interactions with the island of Luzon and Mindanao, historians William Henry Scott and Isabelo de los Reyes are skeptical of Chinese activity in the 16th century or earlier. Both authors assert the claim that the Chinese only began to arrive in the early colonial period, and the latter claimed that by the administration of Lakan Dula, Luzon (or sometimes referring to Manila) monopolized the articles distributed by the Chinese and sometimes by the Japanese. In the Philippine Islands by Blair and Robertson, Chao Ju-Kua from the 13th century mentioned "San-hsii", which they believed to be the Visayas islands, however no other historian has affirmed nor investigated this claim, and written evidence is also absent.

=== Spanish colonization of the Philippines (16th century–1898) ===
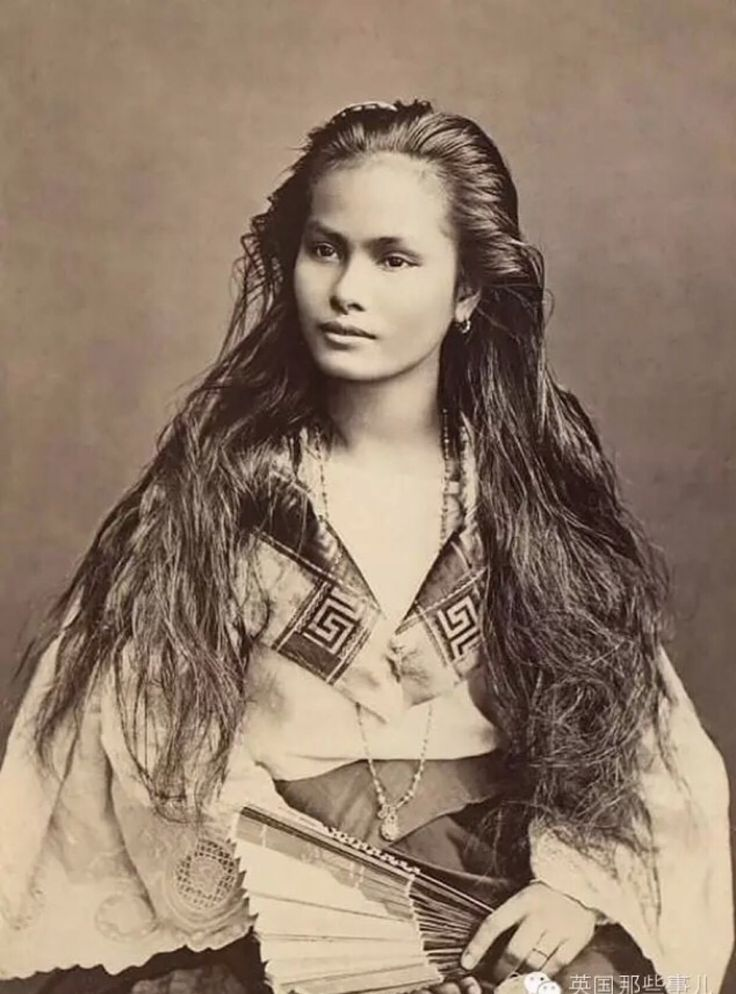
A Chinese mestiza in a photograph by Francisco Van Camp, c. 1875.

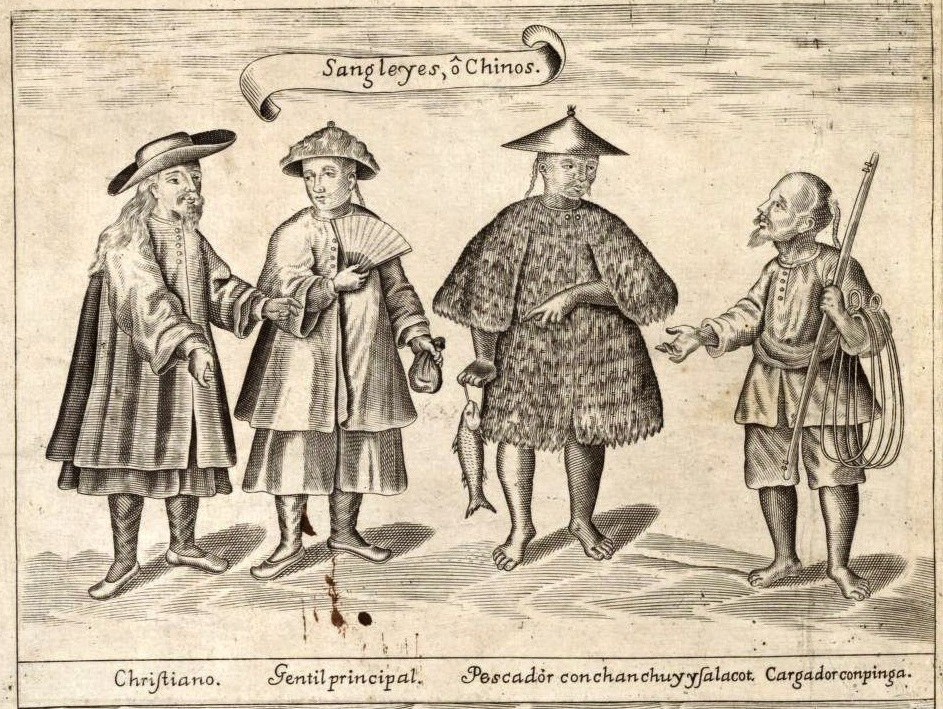
Sangleys of different social classes in the Spanish era, as depicted in the Carta Hydrographica y Chorographica de las Yslas Filipinas (1734)

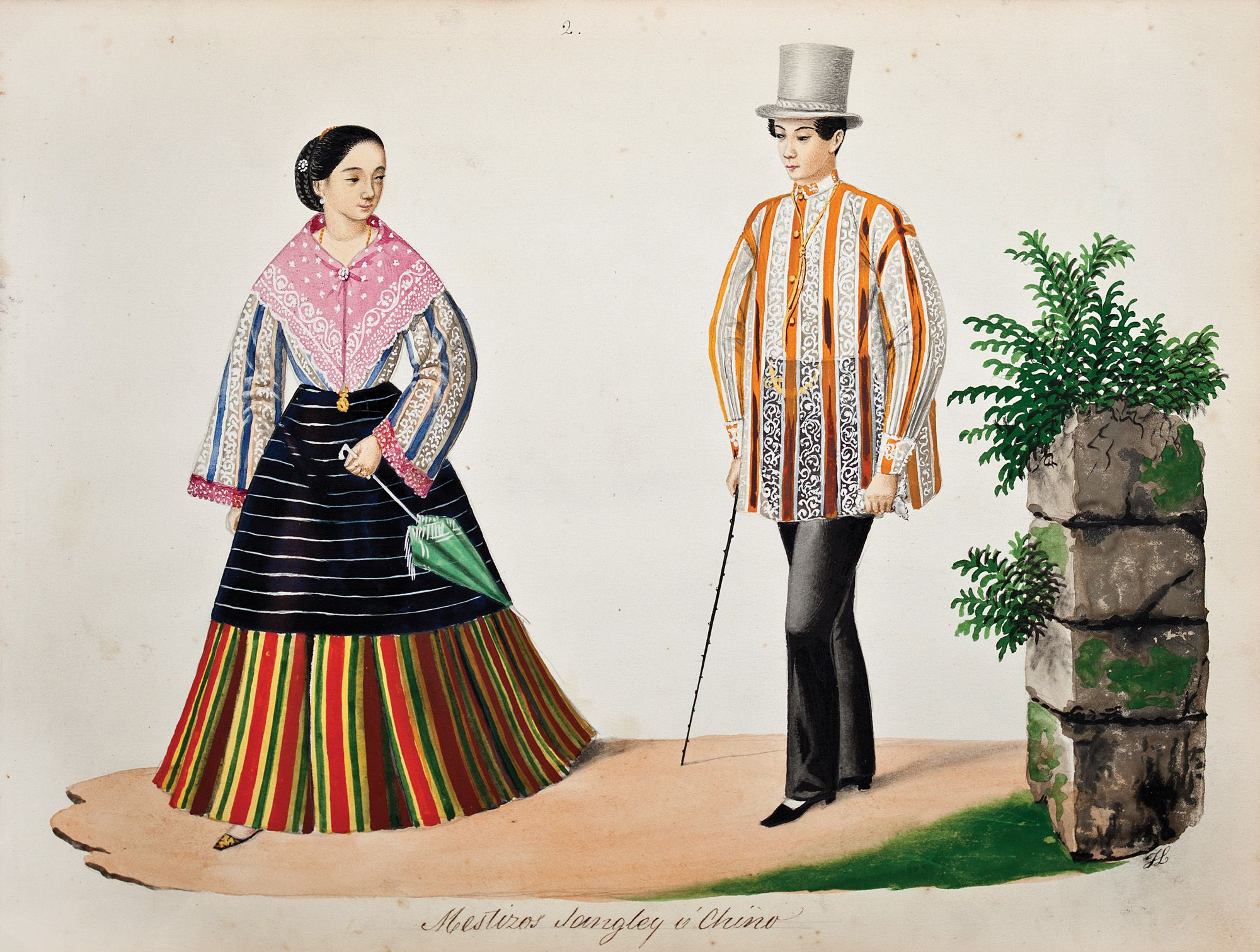
Mestizos Sangley y Chino (Sangley Chinese-Filipino Mestizos), c. 1841 Tipos del País Watercolor by Justiniano Asuncion

"Sangley" was the term used during the Spanish colonial period in the Philippines to refer to any ethnic Chinese person, regardless of specific ancestral origin in China. In the case of the Philippines, the majority came from the province of Fujian in China, mostly the Southern Min people in Southern Fujian, specifically the Hokkien people, who speak southern Fujian's Hokkien language. The Hokkien people have their own unique culture, language, and religious belief systems, different from other ethnic groups in China.

The Chinese population originally occupied the Binondo area and eventually spread all over the islands, becoming traders, moneylenders and landowners.

In the late 18th century, Fr. Joaquín Martínez de Zúñiga conducted a census of the Archdiocese of Manila, which held most of Luzon under its spiritual care, and he reported that the tributes represented an average family of 5 to 7 per tribute; in which case there were 90,243 native Filipino tributes; 10,512 Chinese (Sangley) and mixed Chinese Filipino mestizo tributes; and 10,517 mixed Spanish Filipino mestizo tributes. Pure Spaniards were not counted, as they were exempt from tribute. Out of these, Fr. Joaquín Martínez de Zúñiga estimated a total population count exceeding half a million souls with Chinese and Chinese Mestizos forming 10,512 of the total tribute of 110,000+. In the provinces: Pampanga was home to 870 Chinese Filipino tributes/families, the City of Pasig had half of its 3,000 tributes/families to be Chinese Filipinos. In 1603, Manila itself was also home to 25,000 Chinese immigrants. Ilocos which was a separate bishopric from the Archdiocese of Manila had a comparatively large Chinese population which numbered 10,041 Chinese Filipino families. The province of Laguna had 2,000 Chinese-Filipino farmers/families. Biñan on the other hand had 256 Chinese-Filipino tributes.

The Spanish, who initially viewed the Sangley as a good source of manpower and commerce for the colony, gradually had shifting perspectives due to presupposed threats of Chinese invasion, which historically never materialized. Regardless, the Spanish, including the clergy, sought ways to justify the limiting or expulsion of the Sangley population in the Philippines. The main contentions were often on religious morality grounds, such as vices of sodomy by homosexuals, gambling, greed and the like that Spanish friars identified among non-Christian Sangley.

=== Chinese mestizos as Filipinos ===
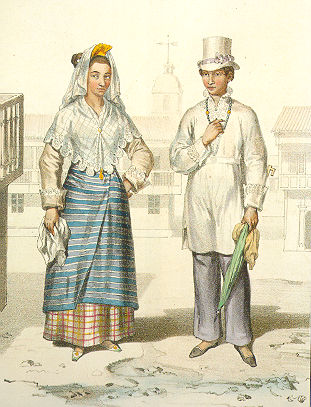
French Illustration of a Chinese mestizo couple c.1846 by Jean Mallat de Bassilan

During the Philippine Revolution of 1898, Mestizos de Sangley (Chinese mestizos) would eventually refer to themselves as Filipino, which during that time referred to Spaniards born in the Philippines. The Chinese mestizos would later fan the flames of the Philippine Revolution. Many leaders of the Philippine Revolution themselves have substantial Chinese ancestry. These include Emilio Aguinaldo, Andrés Bonifacio, Marcelo del Pilar, Antonio Luna, José Rizal and Manuel Tinio.

=== Chinese mestizos in the Visayas ===
Sometime in 1750, an adventurous young man named Wo Sing Lok, also known as "Sin Lok" arrived in Manila, Philippines. The 12-year-old traveler came from Amoy, the old name for Xiamen, an island known in ancient times as "Gateway to China"—near the mouth of Jiulong "Nine Dragon" River in the southern part of Fujian Province.

Earlier in Manila, immigrants from China were herded to stay in the Chinese trading center called "Parian". After the Sangley Revolt of 1603, this was destroyed and burned by the Spanish authorities. Three decades later, Chinese traders built a new and bigger Parian near Intramuros.

For fear of a Chinese uprising similar to that in Manila, the Spanish authorities implementing the royal decree of Gov. Gen. Juan de Vargas dated July 17, 1679, rounded up the Chinese in Iloilo and hamletted them in the parian (now Avanceña Street). It compelled all local unmarried Chinese to live in the Parian and all married Chinese to stay in Binondo. Similar Chinese enclaves or "Parian" were later established in Camarines Sur, Cebu, and Iloilo.

Sin Lok together with the progenitors of the Lacson, Sayson, Ditching, Layson, Ganzon, Sanson and other families who fled Southern China during the reign of the despotic Qing dynasty (1644–1912) in the 18th century and arrived in Maynilad; finally, decided to sail farther south and landed at the port of Batiano river to settle permanently in "Parian" near La Villa Rica de Arevalo in Iloilo.

=== American colonial era (1898–1946) ===
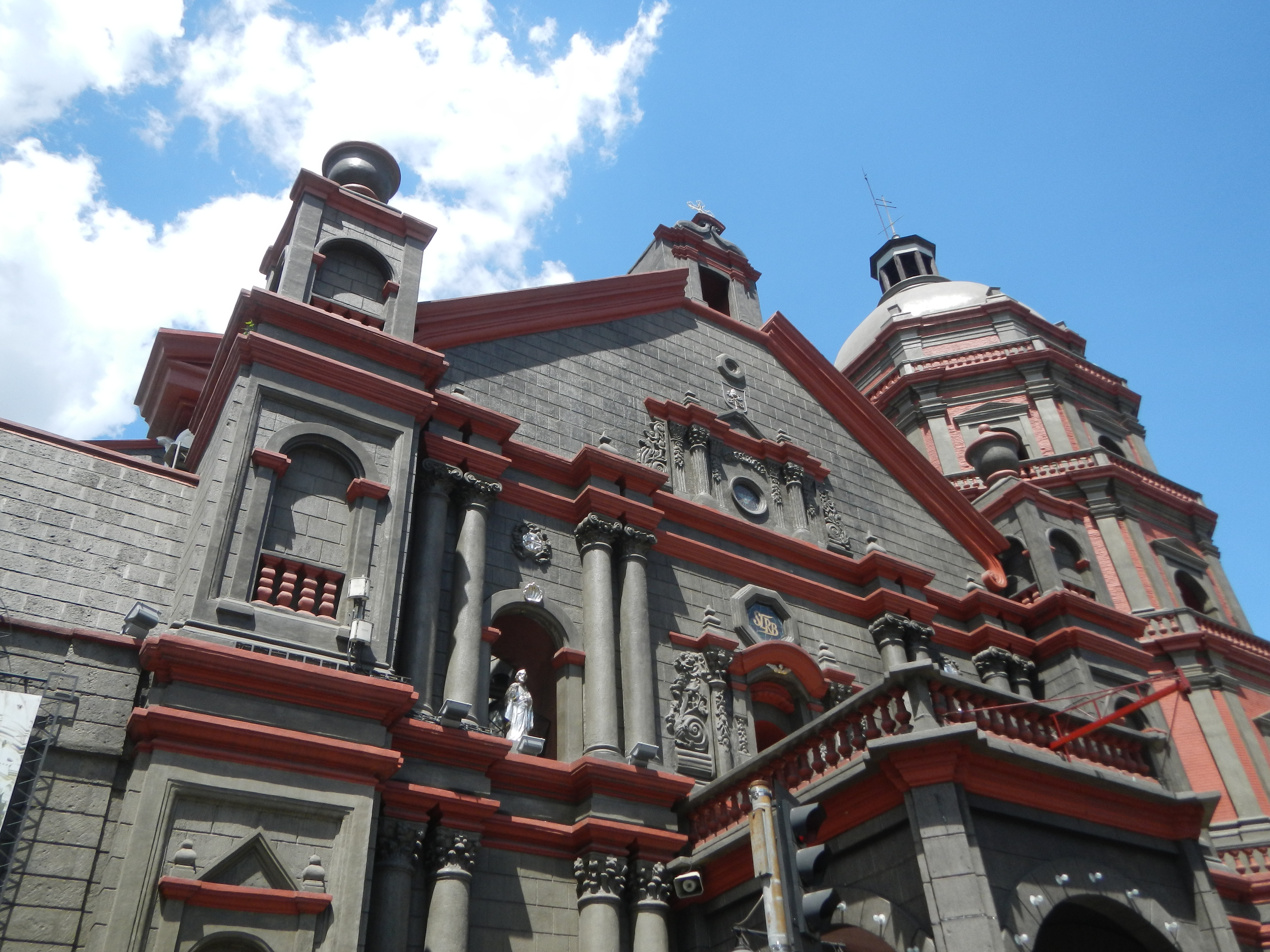
Binondo Church, the main church of the district of Binondo

During the American colonial period, the Chinese Exclusion Act in the United States was also put into effect in the Philippines. Nevertheless, the Chinese were able to settle in the Philippines with the help of other Chinese Filipinos, despite strict American law enforcement, usually through "adopting" relatives from Mainland or by assuming entirely new identities with new names. The privileged position of the Chinese as middlemen of the economy under Spanish colonial rule quickly fell, as the Americans favored the principalía (educated elite) formed by Chinese mestizos and Spanish mestizos. As American rule in the Philippines started, events in Mainland China starting from the Taiping Rebellion, Chinese Civil War and Boxer Rebellion led to the fall of the Qing dynasty, which led thousands of Chinese from Fujian in China to migrate en masse to the Philippines to avoid poverty, worsening famine and political persecution. This group eventually formed the bulk of the current population of unmixed Chinese Filipinos.

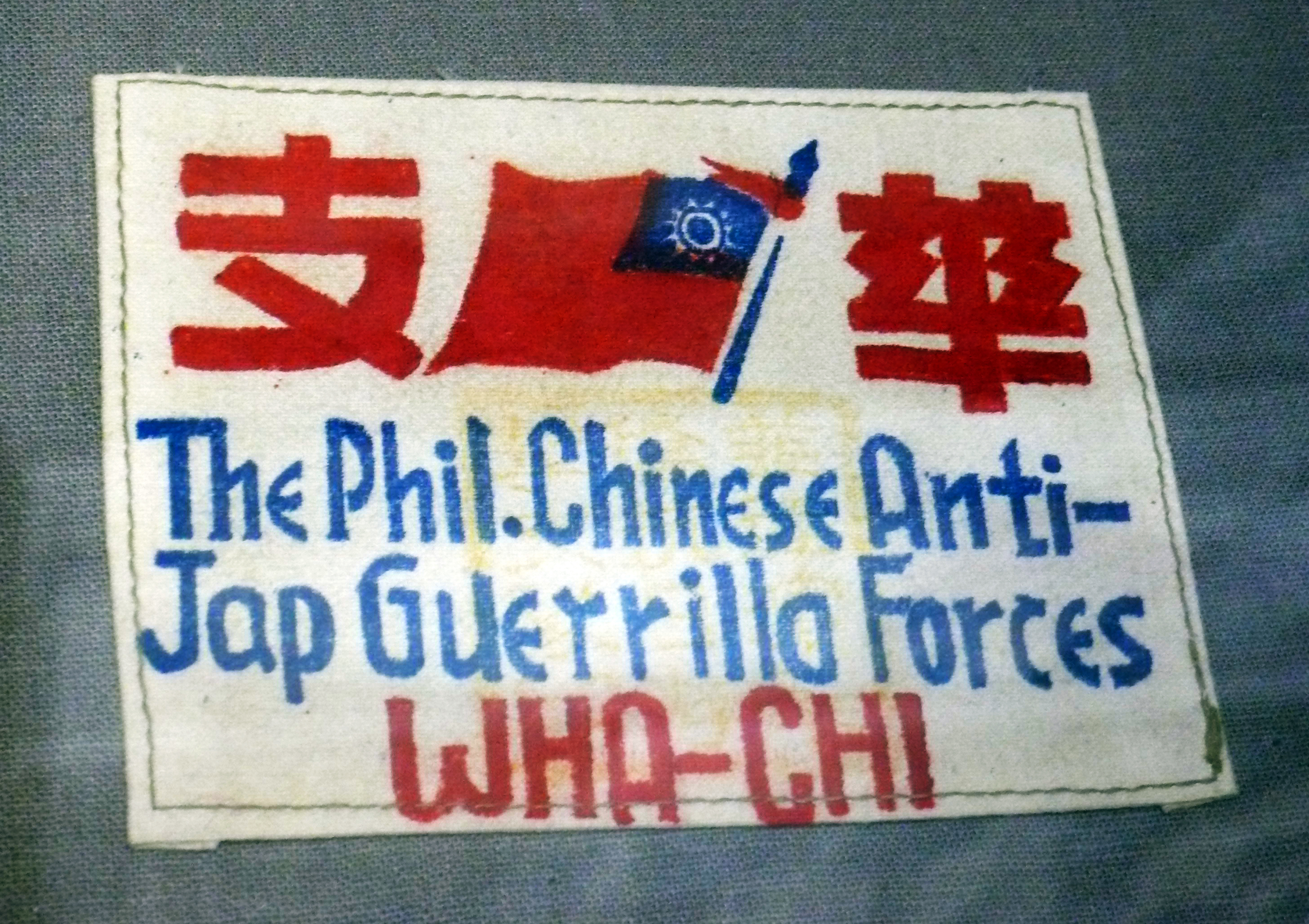
Arm-tag of the Wha-Chi Battalion or Squadron 48

=== Formation of the Chinese Filipino identity (1946–1975) ===
During World War II, the new-found unity between the ethnic Chinese migrants and the indigenous Filipinos against a common enemy – the Japanese, served as a catalyst in the formation of a Chinese Filipino identity who started to regard the Philippines as their home.

=== Chinese as aliens under the Marcos regime (1975–1986) ===
Under the administration of Ferdinand Marcos, Chinese Filipinos were called lao cao (老猴; lāu-kâu, meaning "old people" or literally, "old monkey" (a humorous reference to the Monkey King (Sun Wukong) from Journey to the West), i.e., Chinese in the Philippines who acquired citizenship, only those who arrived in the country before World War II. Those who arrived after the war were called the "jiu qiao" (旧侨; 舊僑; jiù qiáo; 'old sojourner'). They were residents who came from China (also usually southern Fujian) via British Hong Kong between the 1950s to 1980s.

Chinese schools in the Philippines, which were governed by the Ministry of Education of the Republic of China (Taiwan), were transferred under the jurisdiction of the Philippine government's Department of Education. Virtually all Chinese schools were ordered closed or else to limit the time allotted for Chinese language, history and culture subjects from four hours to two hours and instead devote them to the study of Filipino languages and culture. Marcos' policies eventually led to the formal assimilation of the Chinese Filipinos into mainstream Filipino society, the majority were granted citizenship, under the administration of Corazon Aquino and Fidel Ramos.

Following the February 1986 People Power Revolution (EDSA 1), the Chinese Filipinos quickly gained national spotlight as Aquino, a Tarlac Chinese mestiza from the influential Cojuangco family took up the Presidency. She was honored by General Ye Fei of China, who was a recipient of China's highest national medal in 1955, he was also a Chinese-Filipino.

=== Return of democracy (1986–2000) ===
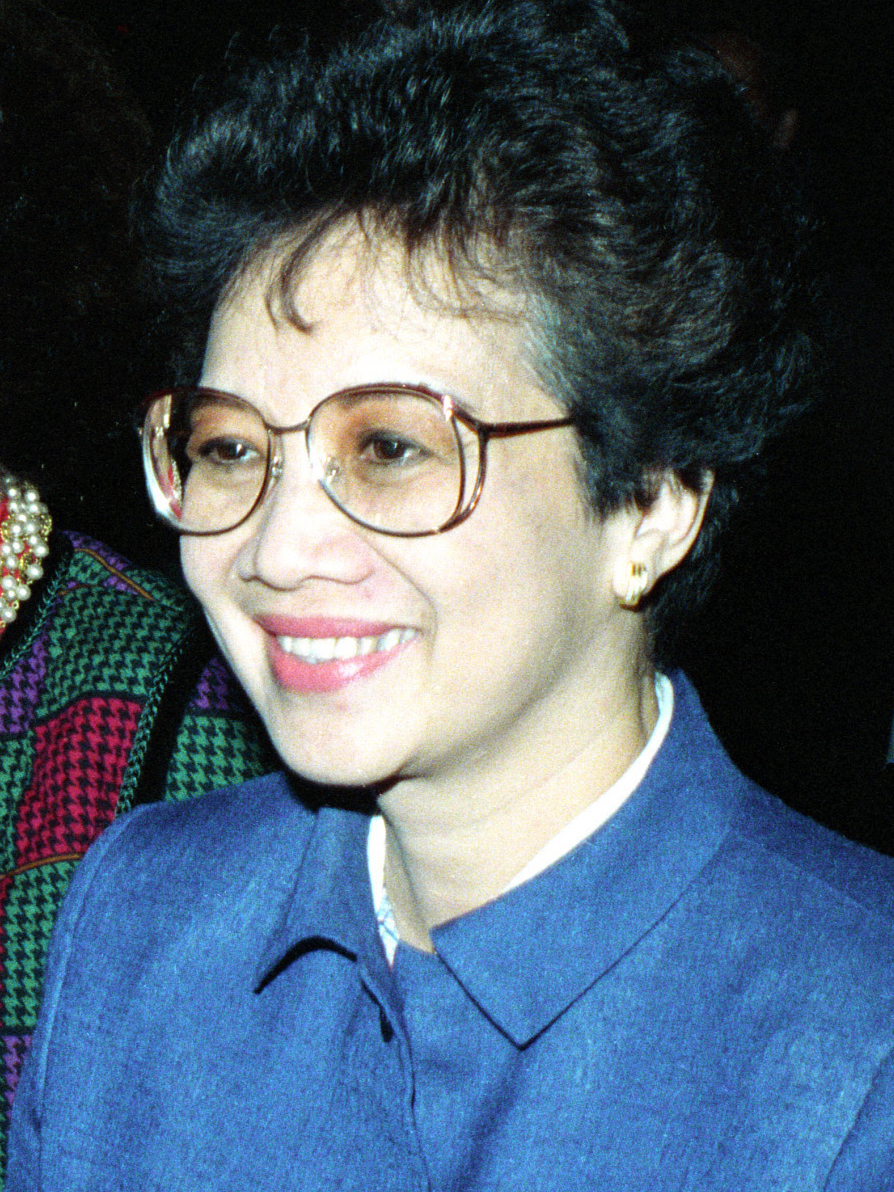
Corazon Aquino, of Sangley Chinese mestizo ancestry of Tarlac, is the third Philippine president to have ethnic Chinese ancestry through the Cojuangco family.

Despite getting better protections, crimes against Chinese Filipinos were still present, the same way as against other ethnic groups in the Philippines, due to the country still battling the lingering economic effects of the Marcos regime. All these led to the formation of the first Chinese Filipino organization, Kaisa Para Sa Kaunlaran, Inc. (Unity for Progress) by Teresita Ang See (Note: Kaisa, the organization she heads, aims to inform the Filipino mainstream of the contributions of the ethnic Chinese to Philippine historical, economic and political life. At the same time, Kaisa encourages Chinese Filipinos to maintain loyalties to the Philippines, rather than China or Taiwan.) which called for mutual understanding between the ethnic Chinese and the native Filipinos. Aquino encouraged free press and cultural harmony, a process which led to the burgeoning of the Chinese-language media. During this time, the third wave of Chinese migrants came. They are known as the "xin qiao" (新侨; 新僑; xīn qiáo; 'new sojourner'); tourists or temporary visitors with fake papers, fake permanent residencies or fake Philippine passports that began arriving in the 1990s during the administration of Fidel Ramos and Joseph Estrada.

=== 21st century (2001–present) ===
More Chinese Filipinos were given Philippine citizenship during the 21st century. Chinese influence in the country increased during the pro-China presidency of Gloria Arroyo. "Xin qiao" Chinese migration from mainland China into the Philippines intensified from 2016 onward, due to controversial pro-China policies by the Rodrigo Duterte presidency, prioritizing Chinese POGO businesses.

The Chinese Filipino community have expressed concerns over the ongoing disputes between China and the Philippines, with the majority preferring peaceful approaches to the dispute to safeguard their own private businesses. The community has also expressed concerns over the increased anti-Chinese sentiment from other Filipinos resulting from issues surrounding the POGO businesses and investigations on the background of former Bamban mayor Alice Guo, who was accused by the authorities of having links to a POGO business in the municipality.

== Origins ==
Ethnicity of Chinese Filipinos, including Chinese mestizos

Most Chinese Filipinos in the Philippines are Hoklo people, historically speaking Hokkien. Many Chinese Filipinos are either fourth-, third-, or second-generation; in general natural-born Philippine citizens who can still recognize their Chinese roots and have Chinese relatives in China, as well as in other Southeast Asian, Australasian or North American countries.

According to a study of around 30,000 gravestones in the Manila Chinese Cemetery of Metro Manila with marked birthplaces or ancestral places of the interred, 89.26% were from within the Hokkien-speaking Southern Min region in Southern Fujian, while 9.86% were from Cantonese regions in Guangdong (Canton) province. More specifically on those of the Southern Min region, 65.01% hailed from Jinjiang (from coastal Quanzhou), 17.25% from Nan'an (from coastal Quanzhou), 7.94% from Xiamen (city proper), 2.90% from Hui'an (from coastal Quanzhou), 1.52% from Longxi (within Longhai, coastal Zhangzhou), 1.21% from Siming (southern district of Xiamen or Xiamen itself), 1.14% from Quanzhou (city proper), 1.10% from Tong'an (from coastal Xiamen), 0.83% from Shishi (from coastal Quanzhou), 0.57% from Yongchun (from inland Quanzhou), and 0.53% from Anxi (from inland Quanzhou).

According to a study in March 27 to 29, 2005 by two scholars, Gyo Miyabara and Ito Jimenez, in Metro Cebu, they inspected 1,436 gravestones of Chinese Filipinos in five cemeteries of Cebu, namely Cebu Memorial Park, Queen City Memorial Park, Manila Memorial Park Cebu (Liloan), Cebu Chinese Cemetery (宿務華僑義山), and Ludo Memorial Park. The gravestones inspected with marked birthplaces or ancestral places from China of those interred were as follows, 669 graves (46.6%) hailed from Jinjiang, 362 graves (25.2%) from Nan'an, 147 graves (10.2%) from Huli district (湖里區; Ô͘-lí-khu, former 禾山; Hô-soaⁿ), 80 graves (5.6%) from Siming district, 46 graves (3.2%) from Kinmen, 31 graves (2.2%) from Guangdong, 11 graves (0.8%) from Shishi, and 45 graves (3.1%) from other parts of China or left unlabeled.

=== Hokkien people ===
Chinese Filipinos who have roots as Hokkien people predominantly have ancestors who came from Southern Fujian and usually speak or at least have Philippine Hokkien as a heritage language. They form the bulk of Chinese settlers in the Philippines during or after the Spanish colonial period, and settled or spread primarily from Metro Manila and key cities in Luzon such as Angeles City, Baguio, Dagupan, Ilagan, Laoag, Lucena, Tarlac and Vigan, as well as in major Visayan and Mindanao cities such as Bacolod, Cagayan de Oro, Cotabato, Metro Cebu, Metro Davao, Dumaguete, General Santos, Iligan, Metro Iloilo, Ormoc, Tacloban, Tagbilaran and Zamboanga.

Hokkien peoples (Note: also known in Fukienese / Hokkienese / Fookienese / Fujianese; Hokkien: simplified Chinese: 咱人 / 福建人 / 闽南人; traditional Chinese: 咱儂 / 福建儂 / 閩南儂; Pe̍h-ōe-jī: Lán-nâng / Lán-lâng / Nán-nâng / Hok-kiàn-lâng / Bân-lâm-lâng; Mandarin: simplified Chinese: 福建人 / 闽南人; traditional Chinese: 福建人 / 閩南人; pinyin: Fújiànren / Mǐnnánrén) form 98.7% of all unmixed ethnic Chinese in the Philippines. Of the Hokkien peoples, about 75% are from Quanzhou Prefecture (especially around Jinjiang City), 23% are from Zhangzhou Prefecture and 2% are from Xiamen City.

The Hokkien-descended Chinese Filipinos currently dominate the light and heavy industries, as well as the entrepreneurial and real estate sectors of the Philippine economy. Many younger Hokkien-descended Chinese Filipinos are also entering the fields of banking, computer science, engineering, finance and medicine.

To date, most emigrants and permanent residents from Mainland China, as well as the vast majority of Taiwanese people in the Philippines are also of Hokkien background.

=== Teochew people ===
Linguistically related to the Hokkien people are the Teochew.

They migrated in large numbers to the Philippines during the Spanish period to the main Luzon island of the Philippines, such as the famed smuggler, Limahong, and his followers who were originally from Raoping, Chaozhou, but later on were eventually assimilated by intermarriage with the mainstream Hokkien.

The Teochews are often mistaken for being Hokkien.

=== Cantonese people ===
Chinese Filipinos who have roots as Cantonese people have ancestors who came from Guangdong province and speak or at least have Cantonese or Taishanese as a heritage language. They settled down in Metro Manila, as well as in major cities of Luzon such as Baguio City, Angeles City, Naga and Olongapo. Many also settled in the provinces of Northern Luzon (e.g., Benguet, Cagayan, Ifugao, Ilocos Norte) especially around Baguio. Examples of those of Cantonese descent are people like Ma Mon Luk, the Tecson and Ticzon families descended from the three "Tek Sun" brothers from Guangzhou (Canton), Guangdong.

Cantonese people form roughly 1.2% of the unmixed ethnic Chinese population of the Philippines, with large numbers of descendants originally from either Taishan, Kaiping, Macau, Hong Kong, Guangzhou, or nearby areas transiting from either Macau, Hong Kong, or Guangzhou. Many were/are not as economically prosperous as the Hokkien Chinese Filipinos. Barred from owning land during the Spanish colonial period, most Cantonese went into the service industry, working as cooks, carpenters, miners, artisans, househelpers, bakers, shoemakers, metal workers, barbers, herbal physicians, porters/stevedores (cargadores / coulis), soap makers and tailors. During the Spanish era, they were usually known in Spanish as "chinos macaos" or "chinos macanistas" and were mostly working as miners in Ilocos Sur. They were renowned cooks and carpenters in Manila and Iloilo especially during the 1800s; enough that Jose Rizal mentioned in El Filibusterismo (1891) a famous restaurant run by them known as Pancitería Macanista de Buen Gusto. They also intermarried with other local Filipinos during the Spanish era and many of their descendants are now assimilated as Chinese mestizos. There are also those that came during the American colonial period before WW2 especially in Baguio as part of the 700 Chinese (Cantonese) coolie laborers recruited from British Hong Kong by the British managing the Manila Railroad Company for the construction of the Benguet Road (Kennon Road) along with the Japanese (who also later stayed to become Japanese Filipinos) and other lowland Filipinos. In Baguio, Cantonese Chinese were known for their carpentry, masonry, and culinary skills, where they were employed in hotels and places like Camp John Hay; setting up businesses like restaurants, grocery stores, bazaars, hardware stores, sari-sari stores and dried fish stalls. The logging, mining, and agribusiness industry during the 1930s in Baguio was also big among the Cantonese Chinese Filipinos there and it was only at such time during 1930s and after WW2 when Hokkien Chinese Filipinos started to establish themselves in Baguio. Presently, they are into small-scale entrepreneurship and in education. There are also about 30 or so Filipino Cantonese associations in the Philippines, such as the Baguio Filipino Cantonese Association CAR (BFCA-CAR), which was merged from The Baguio Cantonese Association and the Brotherhood of Filipino-Cantonese Mestizos during 1999. There are also schools such as Baguio Patriotic School and Manila Patriotic School.

=== Chinese Moro mestizos ===
The assimilation and intermarriages between the local Muslim Moro Tausug and Sama in Sulu and the Han Chinese immigrants, in contrast to Chinese living in Filipino Catholic areas, was facilitated by the good relations throughout history between China and Sulu.

The Chinese mestizo descendants of Han Chinese men and Moro Muslim Tausug and Sama women are integrating and dissolving into the Tausug and Sama population as they lose practice of Chinese culture except celebrating some festivals and their Chinese names.

== Demographics ==
Dialect	Population
Hokkienese	1,044,000
Cantonese	13,000
Mandarin	550
Chinese mestizo*	486,000

- The figure above denotes first-generation Chinese mestizos – namely, those with one Chinese and one Filipino parent. This figure does not include those who have less than 50% Chinese ancestry, who are mostly classified as "Filipino".

The exact number of Filipinos with Chinese ancestry is unknown, as the Philippine Statistics Authority does not conduct official surveys on ethnicity. Various estimates have been given from the start of the Spanish colonial period up to the present, ranging from 10% to as high as 18–27%.

According to a research report by historian Austin Craig who was commissioned by the United States in 1915 to ascertain the total number of the various races of the Philippines, the pure Chinese, referred to as Sangley, number around 20,000 (as of 1918), and that around one-third of the population of Luzon have partial Chinese ancestry. This came with a footnote about the widespread concealing and de-emphasising of the exact number of Chinese in the Philippines.

Another source dating from the Spanish Colonial Period shows the growth of the Chinese and the Chinese mestizo population to nearly 10% of the Philippine population by 1894.

Race	Population (1810)	Population (1850)	Population (1894)
Malay (i.e., indigenous Filipino)	2,395,677	4,725,000	6,768,000
mestizo de sangley (i.e., Chinese mestizo)	120,621	240,000	500,000
mestizo de español (i.e., Spanish mestizo)	7,000 (tributes) x 5 (Minimum family-size) = 35,000	70,000	140,000
sangley (i.e., Unmixed Chinese)	7,000	25,000	100,000
Peninsular (i.e., Spaniard)	4,000	10,000	35,000
Total	2,619,705	5,184,814	7,772,628

== Language ==
Languages spoken by Chinese Filipinos at home

The vast majority (74.5%) of Chinese Filipinos, especially those in Metro Manila and the surrounding regions, speak Filipino (Tagalog) and/or Philippine English as their native language. Most Chinese Filipinos (77%) still retain the ability to understand and speak Hokkien as a second or third language.

The use of Hokkien as a first language is seemingly confined to the older generation and to Chinese Filipino families living in traditional Chinese Filipino centers, such as the Binondo Chinatown district of Manila, Caloocan, Davao Chinatown, Cebu, Cagayan de Oro and many other parts of the Philippines. In part due to the increased adoption of Philippine nationality during the Marcos Sr. era, most Chinese Filipinos born from the 1970s to the mid-1990s tend to use English, Filipino (Tagalog) and other Philippine regional languages, which they frequently code-switch between as Taglish or mix together with Hokkien as Hokaglish. Among the younger generation (born from the mid-1990s onward), the preferred language is often English besides also, of course, knowing Filipino (Tagalog) and, in most regions of the Philippines, other regional languages. Recent arrivals from Mainland China or Taiwan, despite coming mostly from traditionally Hokkien-speaking areas, typically use Mandarin among themselves.

Unlike other overseas Chinese communities in Southeast Asia, which feature an assortment of dialect groups, Chinese Filipinos descend overwhelmingly from Hokkien-speaking regions in Southern Fujian. Hence, Hokkien remains the main heritage language among Chinese Filipinos. Mandarin, however, is perceived as the most prestigious Chinese language, so it is taught in Chinese Filipino schools and used in all official and formal functions within the Chinese Filipino community despite the fact that very few Chinese Filipinos are conversant in Mandarin or have it as a heritage language.

For the Chinese mestizos, Spanish used to be the most important prestige language and the preferred first language during the Spanish colonial era. Starting from the American period, the use of Spanish gradually decreased and is now completely replaced by either English or Filipino.

=== Philippine Hokkien ===
Since most Chinese Filipinos in the Philippines trace their ancestry to Southern Fujian in Fujian Province of mainland China, the Hokkien language, specifically the Philippine Hokkien dialect, is the heritage language of most Chinese Filipinos. Currently, it is typically the elderly and those of the older generations, such as the Silent Generation, the Baby boomer generation and a part of Generation X, who speak Philippine Hokkien as their first or second language, especially as first- or second-generation Chinese Filipinos. The younger generations, such as part of Generation X and most Millennials and Generation Z youth, sparsely use Hokkien as a second or third language and even more seldom as a first language. This is due to Hokkien nowadays only being used and heard within family households and no longer being taught at schools. As a result, most of the youth can either only understand Hokkien by ear or do not know it at all, instead using English, Filipino (Tagalog) and in some cases one or more other Philippine languages.

The Chinese Sangley community in the Philippines centuries ago during Spanish colonial times spoke a mix of different Hokkien dialects (Zhangzhou/Chiangchiu, Quanzhou/Chuanchiu, Amoy/Xiamen), enough that the Hokkien recorded by the Spaniards during the early 1600s, such as in the Dictionario Hispanico Sinicum (1604), resembled the Zhangzhou dialect more, contrary to the modern 21st century Philippine Hokkien that now resembles the Quanzhou dialect more.

=== Mandarin ===
Mandarin is currently the subject and medium of instruction for teaching Standard Chinese (Mandarin) class subjects in Chinese Filipino schools in the Philippines. However, since the language is rarely used outside of the classroom besides jobs and interactions related to mainland China and Taiwan, most Chinese Filipinos would be hard-pressed to converse in Mandarin.

As a result of longstanding influence from the Ministry of Education of the Overseas Chinese Affairs Council of the Republic of China (Taiwan) since the early 1900s up to 2000, the Mandarin variant (known in many schools in Hokkien Chinese: 國語; Pe̍h-ōe-jī: kok-gí) taught and spoken in many older Chinese Filipino schools in the Philippines closely mirrors that of Taiwanese Mandarin, using Traditional Chinese characters and the Zhuyin phonetic system (known in many schools in Hokkien Chinese: 國音; Pe̍h-ōe-jī: kok-im) being taught, though in recent decades Simplified Chinese characters and the Pinyin phonetic system were also introduced from China and Singapore. Some Chinese Filipino schools now also teach Mandarin in Simplified characters with the Pinyin system, modeled after those in China and Singapore. Some schools teach both or either of the systems.

Spanish Dominican Catholic missionaries like Francisco Varo who visited 17th century Fujian (late Ming and early Qing) learned both local Min Chinese and the official Ming dynasty Mandarin Chinese (guanhua) and they explicitly noted that Mandarin was regarded as an elegant, "elevated" language by the local Fujianese Chinese while their own local Min speech were regarded as "coarse speech". They noted Mandarin Guanhua was solemn and used by the educated Fujianese literati and officials while it was the rural villagers and women who only spoke the local Min patois (xiangtan) since they didn't speak Mandarin. Jesuits in Ming dynasty China like Matteo Ricci generally focused on studying the official and prestigious Mandarin while Dominicans studied vernacular Hokkien dialects in Fujian.

=== Cantonese and Taishanese ===
Currently, there are still a few minority Cantonese Filipino families that privately speak Cantonese or Taishanese at home or in their circles, but many who still interact with the overall Chinese Filipino community have also learned to speak Philippine Hokkien for business purposes due to Hokkien's status as a community lingua franca within the Chinese Filipino community. Due to the relatively small population of Chinese Filipinos who are or claim to be of Cantonese ancestry, most Filipinos of Cantonese ancestry, such as Spanish colonial-era Chinese mestizos that originally trace back to Macau or Guangzhou, especially the younger generations thereof, do not speak Cantonese or Taishanese anymore and can only speak the local languages, such as Filipino (Tagalog), English and other Philippine languages such as Ilocano, Cebuano, etc. Some families of Cantonese ancestry within the Chinese Filipino community also speak Philippine Hokkien with their family, especially those that intermarried with Chinese Filipinos of Hokkien ancestry. There may also be some Chinese Filipino families of Hokkien ancestry that speak Cantonese due to a family history of having lived in Hong Kong, such as around the districts of North Point (Chinese: 北角; Pe̍h-ōe-jī: Pak-kak), Kowloon Bay or Causeway Bay, during the Cold War period, when many families fled the communist advance to British Hong Kong and then later to countries in Southeast Asia such as the Philippines or Indonesia.

=== English ===
Just like most other Filipinos, the vast majority of Chinese Filipinos who grew up in the Philippines are fluent in English, especially Philippine English (which descends from American English) as taught in schools in the Philippines. They are usually natively bilingual or even multilingual since both English and Filipino are required subjects in all grades of all schools in the Philippines, as English serves as an important formal prestige language in Philippine society. Due to this, around 30% of all Chinese Filipinos, mostly those belonging to the younger generations, use English as their preferred first language. Others have it as their second language or third language, being natively bilingual or multilingual together with Filipino and sometimes one or more other Philippine languages.

=== Filipino and other Philippine languages ===
The majority of Chinese Filipinos who were born, were raised, or have lived long enough in the Philippines are at least natively bilingual or multilingual. Along with English, Chinese Filipinos typically speak Filipino (Tagalog) and, in non-Tagalog regions, the dominant regional Philippine language(s), such as the Visayan languages (Cebuano, Hiligaynon, Waray, etc.) spoken in the Visayas and Mindanao.

Many Chinese Filipinos, especially those living in the provinces, speak the regional language(s) of their province as their first language(s), if not English or Filipino. Just like most other Filipinos, Chinese Filipinos frequently code-switch either with Filipino or Tagalog and English, known as Taglish, or with other regional provincial languages, such as Cebuano and English, known as Bislish. This frequent code-switching has produced a trilingual mix with the above Philippine Hokkien, known as Hokaglish, which mixes Hokkien, Tagalog and English. However, in provinces where Tagalog is not a native language, the equivalent dominant regional language(s) may be mixed instead of Tagalog or along with Tagalog in a mix of four or more languages due to the normalcy of code-switching and multilingualism as part of Philippine society.

=== Spanish ===
During the Spanish colonial period and the subsequent few decades before its replacement by English, Spanish used to be the formal prestige language of Philippine society and hence, Sangley Chinese (Spanish-era unmixed Chinese), Chinese mestizos (Spanish-era mixed Chinese Filipinos) and Tornatras mestizos (Spanish-era mixed Chinese-Spanish or Chinese-Spanish-native Filipinos) also learned to speak Spanish throughout the Spanish colonial period to the early to mid 20th century when its role was eventually eclipsed by English and later largely dissipated from mainstream Philippine society. Most of the elites of Philippine society during the Spanish colonial era and the American colonial era were Spanish mestizos or Chinese mestizos, which later intermixed together to an unknown degree and now frequently treated as one group known as Filipino mestizos. Due to this history in the Philippines, many of the older generation Chinese Filipinos (mainly those born before WWII), whether pure or mixed, can also understand some Spanish, due to its importance in commerce and industry. The Chinese community of the Philippines during the Spanish colonial era used to also speak a sort of Spanish pidgin variety known as "Caló Chino Español" or "Kastilang tindahan". This was especially the case with the local Sangley Chinese that intermarried during Spanish colonial times. They brought forth Spanish-speaking Chinese Mestizos of varying proficiency, from the accented pidgin Spanish of the new Chinese immigrants to the fluent Spanish of Sangley Chinese old-timers.

== Religion ==
Religion of Chinese Filipinos
1. Catholicism (70.0%)
2. Protestant (13.0%)
3. Other (including Chinese Folk Religion, Buddhism, Taoism, no religion, Islam etc.) (17.0%)

Chinese Filipinos are unique in Southeast Asia in being overwhelmingly Christian (83%). but many families, especially Chinese Filipinos in the older generations still practice traditional Chinese religions. Almost all Chinese Filipinos, including the Chinese mestizos but excluding recent migrants from either mainland China or Taiwan, had or will have their marriages in a Christian church.

In the 18th century, many Chinese converted from traditional religions to Catholicism.

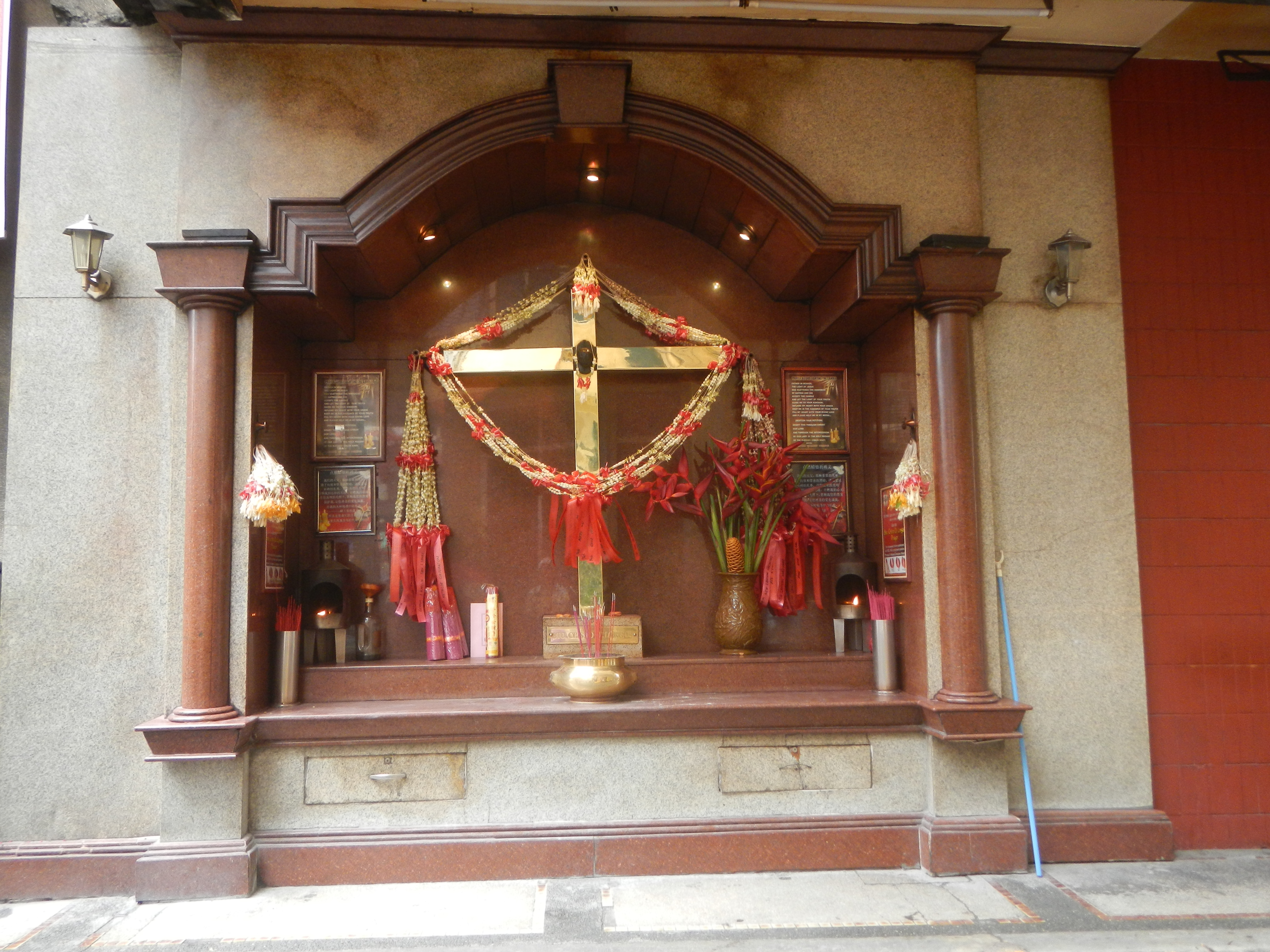
Sto. Cristo de Longos, by Ongpin St., Binondo, Manila

=== Roman Catholicism ===
The majority (70%) of Christian Chinese Filipinos are Catholic. Many Catholic Chinese Filipinos still tend to practice the traditional Chinese religions alongside Catholicism, due to the recent openness of the Church in accommodating Chinese beliefs such as ancestor veneration.

Unique to the Catholicism of Chinese Filipinos is the religious syncretism that is found in Chinese Filipino homes. Many have altars bearing Catholic images such as the Santo Niño (Child Jesus) as well as statues of the Buddha and Taoist deities. It is not unheard of to venerate the Blessed Virgin Mary, saints, or the dead using joss sticks and otherwise traditional offerings, much as one would have done for Guan Yin or Mazu.

=== Protestantism ===
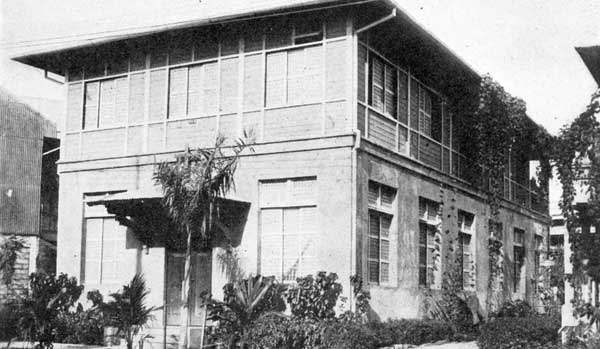
St. Stephen's Church in Manila in 1923, an Anglican church and school for Chinese Filipinos

Approximately 13% of all Christian Chinese Filipinos are Protestants.

Many Chinese Filipino schools are founded by Protestant missionaries and churches.

Chinese Filipinos comprise a large percentage of membership in some of the largest evangelical churches in the Philippines, many of which are also founded by Chinese Filipinos, such as the Christian Gospel Center, Christ's Commission Fellowship, United Evangelical Church of the Philippines and the Youth Gospel Center.

In contrast to Roman Catholicism, Protestantism forbids traditional Chinese practices such as ancestor veneration, but allows the use of meaning or context substitution for some practices that are not directly contradicted in the Bible (e.g., celebrating the Mid-Autumn Festival with moon cakes denoting the moon as God's creation and the unity of families, rather than the traditional Chinese belief in Chang'e). Many also had ancestors already practicing Protestantism while still in China.

Unlike native and mestizo Filipino-dominated Protestant churches in the Philippines which have very close ties with North American organizations, most Protestant Chinese Filipino churches instead sought alliance and membership with the Chinese Congress on World Evangelization, an organization of Overseas Chinese Christian churches throughout Asia.

=== Chinese traditional religions and practices ===

A small number of Chinese Filipinos (2%) continue to practise traditional Chinese religions solely. Mahayana Buddhism, specifically, Chinese Pure Land Buddhism, Taoism and ancestral worship (including Confucianism) are the traditional Chinese beliefs that continue to have adherents among the Chinese Filipino.

Buddhist and Taoist temples can be found where the Chinese live, especially in urban areas like Manila. (Note: Most prominently the Buddhist Seng Guan Temple in Tondo, Manila.) Veneration of the Guanyin (觀音), known locally as Kuan-im either in its pure form or seen a representation of the Virgin Mary is practised by many Chinese Filipinos. The Chinese Filipino community also established indigenous religious denominations like Bell Church (钟教), which is a syncretic religion with ecumenical and interfaith in orientation. There are several prominent Chinese temples like Seng Guan Temple (Buddhist) in Manila, Cebu Taoist Temple in Cebu City and Lon Wa Buddhist Temple in Davao City.

Around half (40%) of all Chinese Filipinos regardless of religion still claim to practise ancestral worship. The Chinese, especially the older generations, have the tendency to go to pay respects to their ancestors at least once a year, either by going to the temple, or going to the Chinese burial grounds, often burning incense and bringing offerings like fruits and accessories made from paper.

Chinese traditional religions have been practiced in the Philippines since 985 at the latest, but there is evidence of cultural and human transference from China to the Philippines since at least 5000 BC, including in matters of folk belief and mythology.

=== Others ===
There are very few Chinese Filipino Muslims, most of whom live in either Mindanao or the Sulu Archipelago and have intermarried or assimilated with their Moro neighbors. Many of them have attained prominent positions as political leaders. They include Datu Piang, Abdusakur Tan and Michael Mastura, among such others.

Others are also members of the Iglesia ni Cristo, Jehovah's Witnesses or the Church of Jesus Christ of Latter-day Saints. Some younger generations of Chinese Filipinos also profess to be atheists.

== Education ==
There are 150 Chinese schools that exist throughout the Philippines, slightly more than half of which operate in Metro Manila. Chinese Filipino schools typically include the teaching of Standard Chinese (Mandarin), among other school class subjects, and have an international reputation for producing award-winning students in the fields of science and mathematics, most of whom reap international awards in mathematics, computer programming, and robotics Olympiads.

=== History ===
The first school founded specifically for the Chinese in the Philippines, the Anglo-Chinese School (now known as Tiong Se Academy) was opened in 1899 on the Qing Dynasty Chinese Embassy grounds. The first curriculum called for rote memorization of the four major Confucian texts (the Four Books and Five Classics) along with Western science and technology. This was followed by the establishment of other Chinese schools, such as Hua Siong College of Iloilo, established in Iloilo in 1912, the Chinese Patriotic School, established in Manila in 1912 (the first school for the Cantonese Chinese), Saint Stephen's High School, established in Manila in 1915 (the first sectarian school for the Chinese), and the Chinese National School, established in Cebu in 1915.

Burgeoning of Chinese schools throughout the Philippines, including in Manila, occurred from the 1920s until the 1970s, with a brief interlude during World War II, when all Chinese schools were ordered closed by the Japanese and their students were forcibly integrated into Japanese-sponsored Philippine public education. After World War II, the Third Republic of the Philippines and the Republic of China (ROC) signed the Sino-Philippine Treaty of Amity, which provided for the direct control of Chinese schools throughout the archipelago by the Republic of China (Taiwan)'s Ministry of Education. In the late 20th century, despite Mandarin taking the place of Amoy Hokkien as the usual Chinese course taught in Chinese schools, some schools still tried to teach Hokkien as well, deeming it more practical in the Philippine-Chinese setting.

Such a situation continued until 1973, when amendments made during the Marcos Era to the Philippine Constitution effectively transferred all Chinese schools to the authority of the Republic of the Philippines' Department of Education (DepEd). With this, the medium of instruction for the teaching of Chinese was shifted from Amoy Hokkien Chinese to Mandarin Chinese (or in some schools to English). Teaching hours delegated to the Chinese language and arts, which featured prominently in the pre-1973 Chinese schools, were reduced. Lessons in Chinese geography and history, which were previously subjects in their own right, were incorporated into the Chinese language subject(s), whereas Filipino (Tagalog) and Philippine history, civics, and culture became newly required subjects.

The changes in Chinese education initiated with the 1973 Philippine Constitution led to a large shifting of mother tongues, reflecting the assimilation of the Chinese Filipinos into general Philippine society. The older generation of Chinese Filipinos, who were educated in the old curriculum, typically use Philippine Hokkien at home, while most younger-generation Chinese Filipinos are more comfortable conversing in English, Filipino (Tagalog), and/or other Philippine languages like Cebuano, including their code-switching forms like Taglish and Bislish, which are sometimes varyingly admixed with Philippine Hokkien to make Hokaglish.

=== Curriculum ===
Chinese Filipino schools typically feature curriculum prescribed by the Philippine Department of Education (DepEd). The limited time spent in Chinese instruction consists largely of language arts.

The three core Chinese subjects are "Chinese Grammar" (simplified Chinese: 华语; traditional Chinese: 華語; pinyin: Huáyǔ; Pe̍h-ōe-jī: Hoâ-gí; Zhuyin Fuhao: ㄏㄨㄚˊ ㄩˇ; lit. 'Chinese Language'), "Chinese Composition" (Chinese: 綜合; pinyin: Zònghé; Pe̍h-ōe-jī: Chong-ha̍p; Zhuyin Fuhao: ㄗㄨㄥˋ ㄏㄜˊ; lit. 'Composition'), and "Chinese Mathematics" (Chinese: 數學; pinyin: Shùxué; Pe̍h-ōe-jī: Sò͘-ha̍k; Zhuyin Fuhao: ㄨˋ ㄒㄩㄝˊ; lit. 'Mathematics'). Other schools may add subjects such as "Chinese Calligraphy" (Chinese: 毛筆; pinyin: Máobǐ; Pe̍h-ōe-jī: Mô͘-pit; Zhuyin Fuhao: ㄇㄠˊ ㄅㄧˇ; lit. 'Calligraphy Brush'). Chinese history, geography and culture are also integrated in all the three core Chinese subjects – they stood as independent subjects of their own before 1973. Many schools currently teach at least just one Chinese subject, known simply as just "Chinese" (simplified Chinese: 华语; traditional Chinese: 華語; pinyin: Huáyǔ; Pe̍h-ōe-jī: Hoâ-gí; Zhuyin Fuhao: ㄏㄨㄚˊ ㄩˇ; lit. 'Chinese Language'). It also varies per school whether either or both Traditional Chinese with Zhuyin (known in many schools in Hokkien Chinese: 國音; Pe̍h-ōe-jī: kok-im) and/or Simplified Chinese with Pinyin is taught. Currently, all Chinese class subjects are taught in Mandarin Chinese (known in many schools in Hokkien Chinese: 國語; Pe̍h-ōe-jī: kok-gí) and in some schools, students are prohibited from speaking any other language, such as English, Filipino (Tagalog), other regional Philippine languages, or even Hokkien during Chinese classes, when decades before, there were no such restrictions.

=== Schools and universities ===
Philippine Cultural College, also known as Kiâo Tiong in Hokkien.

Many Chinese Filipino schools are sectarian, being founded by either Roman Catholic or Chinese Protestant Christian missions. These include Grace Christian College (Protestant-Baptist), Hope Christian High School (Protestant-Evangelical), Immaculate Conception Academy (Roman Catholic-Missionary Sisters of the Immaculate Conception), Jubilee Christian Academy (Protestant-Evangelical), LIGHT Christian Academy (Protestant-Evangelical), Makati Hope Academy (Protestant-Evangelical), MGC-New Life Christian Academy (Protestant-Evangelical), Saint Peter the Apostle School (Roman Catholic-Archdiocese of Manila), Saint Jude Catholic School (Roman Catholic-Society of the Divine Word), Saint Stephen's High School (Protestant-Episcopalian), Ateneo de Iloilo, Ateneo de Cebu and Xavier School (Roman Catholic-Society of Jesus).

Major non-sectarian schools include Chiang Kai Shek College, Manila Patriotic School, Philippine Chen Kuang High School, Philippine Chung Hua School, Philippine Cultural College – the oldest Chinese Filipino secondary school in the Philippines, and Tiong Se Academy – the oldest Chinese Filipino school in the Philippines.

Chiang Kai Shek College is the only college in the Philippines accredited by both the Philippine Department of Education (DepEd) and the Republic of China (Taiwan) Ministry of Education.

Most Chinese Filipinos attend Chinese Filipino schools until secondary level and then transfer to non-Chinese colleges and universities to complete their tertiary degree, due to the dearth of Chinese language tertiary institutions.

=== Influence operations from China ===
In a forum on March 21, 2026, global security expert Ray Powell of the Sealight Foundation alleged that the Chinese government had sent 5,000 mainland Chinese teachers to Chinese Filipino schools throughout the country. This had been ongoing since 1991 as part of the so-called "blood transfusion plan" under the guidance of the "Philippine Chinese Education Research Center". Powell clarified that their research only aimed to prevent the "hostile foreign state" from taking over and exploiting these Chinese Filipino institutions and was not meant to target the Chinese Filipino community as a whole.

Powell's statements allegedly influenced the exodus of many Chinese volunteer teachers in the country, with their parents from the mainland pleading for their return. The Chinese Filipino schools had to conduct online classes with substitute teachers as a result. The Chinese embassy criticized Powell's statements as "malicious smear campaigns" and claimed these threaten the "time-honored friendship between the Chinese and Filipino peoples".

== Name format ==
Many Chinese who lived during the Spanish naming edict of 1849 eventually adopted Spanish name formats, along with a Spanish given name (e.g., Florentino Cu y Chua). Some adopted their entire Chinese name romanized as a surname for the entire clan (e.g., Jose Antonio Chuidian (Pe̍h-ōe-jī: Chui-lian); Alberto Cojuangco (Chinese: 許寰哥; Pe̍h-ōe-jī: Khó-hoân-ko)). Chinese mestizos, as well as some Chinese who chose to completely assimilate into the local Filipino or Spanish culture during Spanish colonial times also adopted Spanish surnames, just as any other Filipino, either as per christening of a new Christian name under Catholic Christian baptismal under the Spanish friars or through the 1849 decree of Gov-Gen. Narciso Claveria that distributed surnames from the Catálogo alfabético de apellidos, most of which listed there were Spanish surnames.

Newer Chinese migrants who came during the American Colonial Period use a combination of an adopted Spanish (or rarely, English) name together with their Chinese name (e.g., Carlos Palanca Tan Quin Lay or Vicente Go Tam Co). This trend was to continue up to the late 1970s.

As both exposure to North American media as well as the number of Chinese Filipinos educated in English increased, the use of English names among Chinese Filipinos, both common and unusual, started to increase as well. Popular names among the second generation Chinese community included English names ending in "-son" or other Chinese-sounding suffixes, such as Anderson, Emerson, Jackson, Jameson, Jasson, Patrickson, Washington, among others. For parents who are already third and fourth generation Chinese Filipinos, English names reflecting American popular trends are given, such as Ethan, Austin and Aidan.

It is thus not unusual to find a young Chinese Filipino, for example, named "Chase Tan", whose father's name is "Emerson Tan" and whose grandfather's name is "Elpidio Tan Keng Kui", reflecting the depth of immersion into the English language as well as into the Philippine society as a whole.

=== Surnames ===
Filipino-Chinese whose ancestors came to the Philippines from 1885 onward usually have monosyllabic Chinese surnames. On the other hand, most Chinese ancestors came to the Philippines prior to 1885 usually have multisyllabic surnames such as Gokongwei, Ongpin, Cuyegkeng, Pempengco, Yuchengco, Tansipek, Teehankee, CuUnjieng and Yaptinchay among such others. These were originally full Chinese names which were transliterated in Spanish orthography and adopted as surnames.

Common single-syllable Chinese Filipino surnames are Tan (陳), Lim (林), Chua (蔡), Uy (黃) and Ong (王). Most such surnames are spelled according to their Hokkien pronunciation.

On the other hand, most Chinese Filipinos whose ancestors came to the Philippines prior to 1885 use a Hispanicized surname (see below). Many Filipinos who have Hispanicized Chinese surnames are no longer pure Chinese, but are Chinese mestizos.

==== Hispanized surnames ====
Chinese Filipinos and Chinese mestizos usually have multisyllabic surnames such as Angseeco (from ang/see/co/kho) Aliangan (from liang/gan), Angkeko, Apego (from ang/ke/co/go/kho), Asico (from au/oh/see/si/co/ko), Chuacuco, Chuatoco, Chuateco, Ciacho (from Sia), Cinco (from Go), Cojuangco, Coquilay, Corong, Consunji, Cuyegkeng, CuUnjieng, Dioquino, Dybuncio, Dytoc, Dy-Cok, Dysangco, Dytioco, Gueco, Gokongwei, Gotamco, Gundayao, Kiamco/Quiamco, Kimpo/Quimpo, King/Quing, Landicho, Lanting, Lim-An, Limcuando, Limgemco, Ongpin, Pempengco, Quebengco, Siopongco, Sycip, Tambengco, Tambunting, Tanbonliong, Tansipek, Tantoco, Tinsay, Tiolengco, Yuchengco, Tanciangco, Yuipco, Yupangco, Licauco, Limcaco, Ongpauco, Tancangco, Tanchanco, Teehankee, Uytengsu and Yaptinchay among such others. These were originally full Hokkien Chinese names which were transliterated in Latin letters with Spanish orthography and adopted as Hispanicized surnames.

There are also multisyllabic Chinese surnames that are Spanish transliterations of Hokkien words. Surnames like Tuason (Eldest Grandchild, 大孫, Tuā-sun), Tiongson/Tiongzon (Eldest Grandchild, 長孫, Tióng-sun)/(Second/Middle Grandchild, 仲孫, Tiōng-sun), Sioson (Youngest Grandchild, 小孫, Sió-sun), Echon/Ichon/Itchon/Etchon/Ychon (First Grandchild, 一孫, It-sun), Dizon (Second Grandchild, 二孫, Lī-sun), Samson/Sanson (Third Grandchild, 三孫, Sam-sun), Sison (Fourth Grandchild, 四孫, Sì-sun), Gozon/Goson/Gozum (Fifth Grandchild, 五孫, Gǒ͘-sun), Lacson (Sixth Grandchild, 六孫, La̍k-sun), Sitchon/Sichon (Seventh Grandchild, 七孫, Chhit-sun), Pueson (Eighth Grandchild, 八孫, Pueh-sun), Causon/Cauzon (Ninth Grandchild, 九孫, Káu-sun), are examples of transliterations of designations that use the Hokkien suffix -son/-zon/-chon (Hokkien Chinese: 孫; Pe̍h-ōe-jī: sun; lit. 'Grandchild') used as surnames for some Chinese Filipinos who trace their ancestry from Chinese immigrants to the Philippines during the Spanish Colonial Period. The surnames 孫, 仲孫, 長孫 are listed in the classic Chinese text Hundred Family Surnames, perhaps shedding light on the Hokkien suffix -son/-zon/-chon used here as a surname alongside some sort of accompanying enumeration scheme.

The Chinese who survived the massacre in Manila in the 1700s fled to other parts of the Philippines and to hide their identity, some also adopted two-syllable surnames ending in "son" or "zon" and "co" such as: Yanson = Yan = 燕孫, Ganzon = Gan = 顏孫(Hokkien), Guanzon = Guan/Kwan = 關孫 (Cantonese), Tiongson/Tiongzon = Tiong = 仲孫 (Hokkien), Cuayson/Cuayzon = 邱孫 (Hokkien), Yuson = Yu = 楊孫, Tingson/Tingzon = Ting = 陳孫 (Hokchew), Siason = Sia = 謝孫 (Hokkien).

Many also took on Spanish or native Filipino surnames (e.g. Alonzo, Alcaraz, Bautista, De la Cruz, De la Rosa, De los Santos, Garcia, Gatchalian, Mercado, Palanca, Robredo, Sanchez, Tagle, Torres, etc.) upon naturalization. Today, it can be difficult to identify who are Chinese Filipino based on surnames alone.

A phenomenon common among Chinese migrants in the Philippines dating from the 1900s would be to purchase their surname, particularly during the American Colonial Period, when the Chinese Exclusion Act was applied to the Philippines. Such law led new Chinese migrants to purchase the Hispanic or native surnames of native and mestizo Filipinos and thus pass off as long-time Filipino residents of Chinese descent or as native or mestizo Filipinos. Many also purchased the Alien Landing Certificates of other Chinese who had gone back to China and assumed his surname and/or identity. Sometimes, younger Chinese migrants would circumvent the Act through adoption – wherein a Chinese with Philippine nationality adopts a relative or a stranger as his own children, thereby giving the adoptee automatic Filipino citizenship – and a new surname.

== Food ==
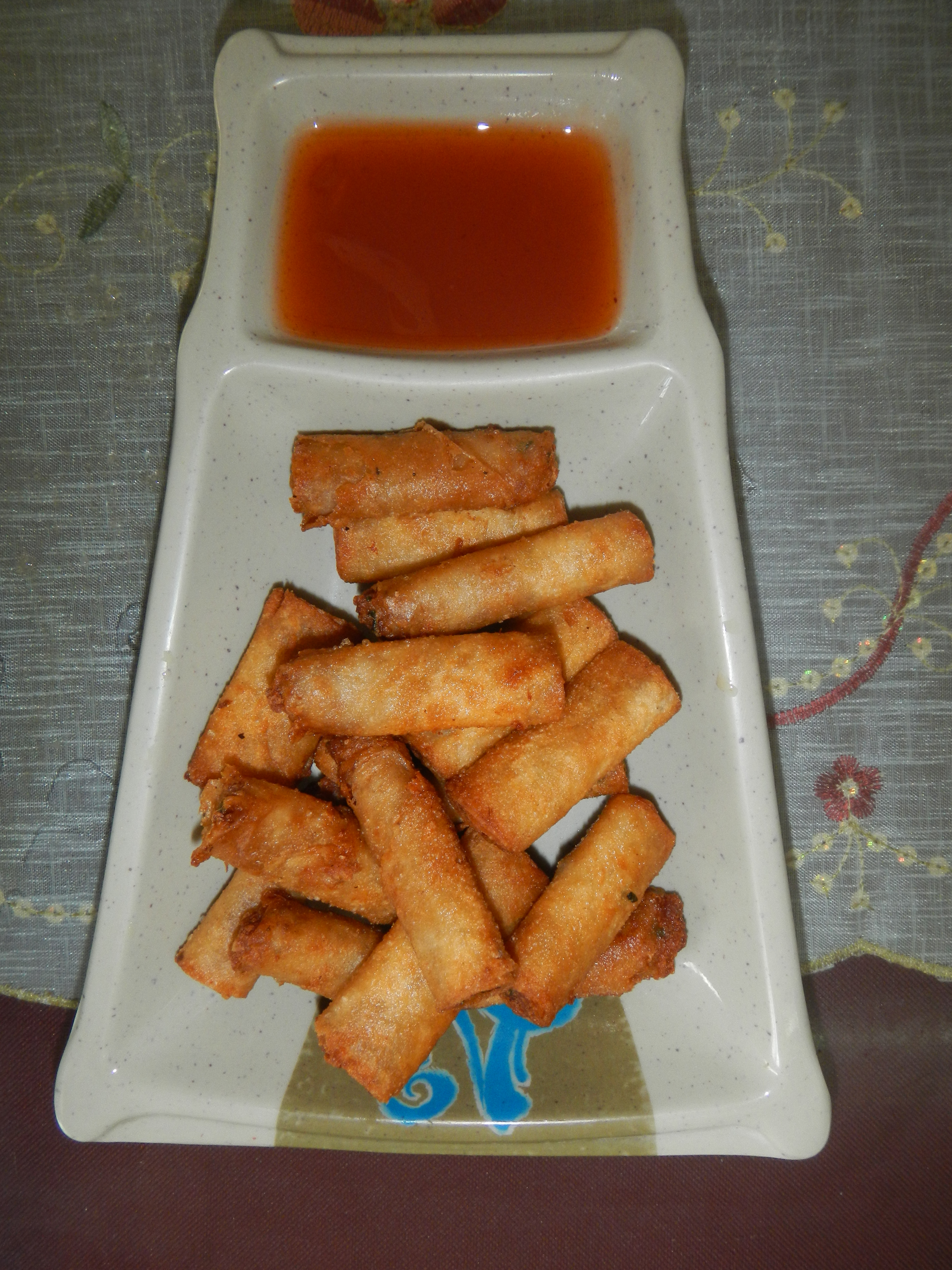
Lumpia (Hokkien: 潤餅), a spring roll of Chinese origin.

Traditional Tsinoy cuisine, as Chinese Filipino home-based dishes are locally known, make use of recipes that are traditionally found in China's Fujian Province and fuse them with locally available ingredients and recipes. These include unique foods such as hokkien chha-peng (Fujianese-style fried rice), si-nit mi-soa (birthday noodles), pansit canton (Fujianese-style e-fu noodles), hong ma or humba (braised pork belly), sibut (four-herb chicken soup), hototay (Fujianese egg drop soup), kiampeng (Fujianese beef fried rice), machang (glutinous rice with adobo) and taho (a dessert made of soft tofu, arnibal syrup and pearl sago).

However, most Chinese restaurants in the Philippines, as in other places, feature Cantonese, Shanghainese and Northern Chinese cuisines, rather than traditional Fujianese fare.

== Politics ==
With the increasing number of Chinese with Philippine nationality, the number of political candidates of Chinese-Filipino descent also started to increase. The most significant change within Chinese Filipino political life would be the citizenship decree promulgated by former President Ferdinand Marcos which opened the gates for thousands of Chinese Filipinos to formally adopt Philippine citizenship.

Chinese Filipino political participation largely began with the People Power Revolution of 1986 which toppled the Marcos dictatorship and ushered in the Aquino presidency. The Chinese have been known to vote in blocs in favor of political candidates who are favorable to the Chinese community.

Important Philippine political leaders with Chinese ancestry include the current president Bongbong Marcos, and former presidents Rodrigo Duterte, Emilio Aguinaldo, Benigno Aquino III, Cory Aquino, Sergio Osmeña, Manuel Quezon and Ferdinand Marcos, former senators Nikki Coseteng, Alfredo Lim, Raul Roco, Panfilo Lacson, Vicente Yap Sotto, Vicente Sotto III and Roseller Lim, as well as several governors, congressmen and mayors throughout the Philippines. Many ambassadors and recent appointees to the presidential cabinet are also Chinese Filipinos like Arthur Yap, Jesse Robredo, Jose Yulo, Manuel Yan, Alberto Lim, Danilo Lim, Karl Chua and Bong Go.

The former Archbishop of Manila, Cardinals Jaime Sin, Rufino Santos and Luis Antonio Tagle also have Chinese ancestry.

== Society and culture ==
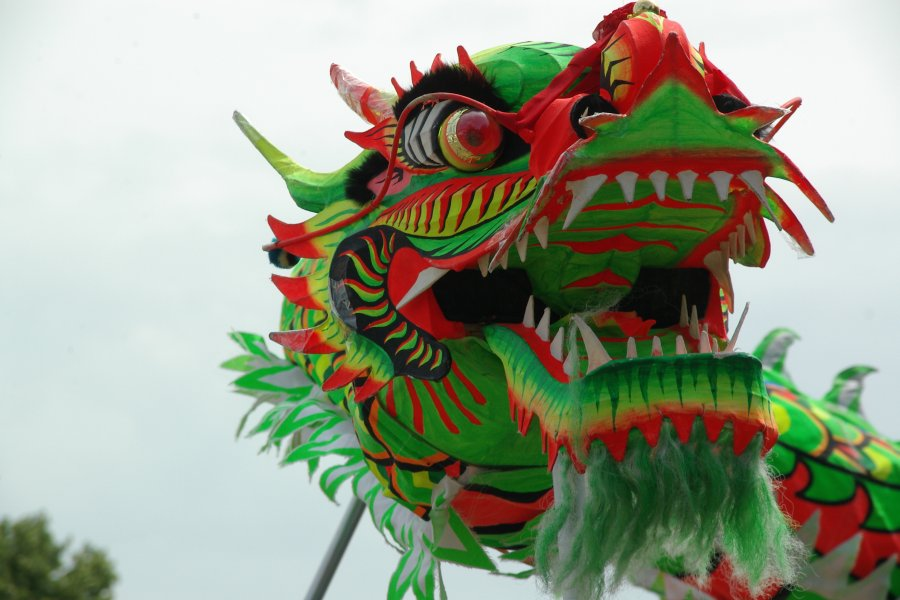
The dragon dance is still a popular tradition among Chinese Filipinos.

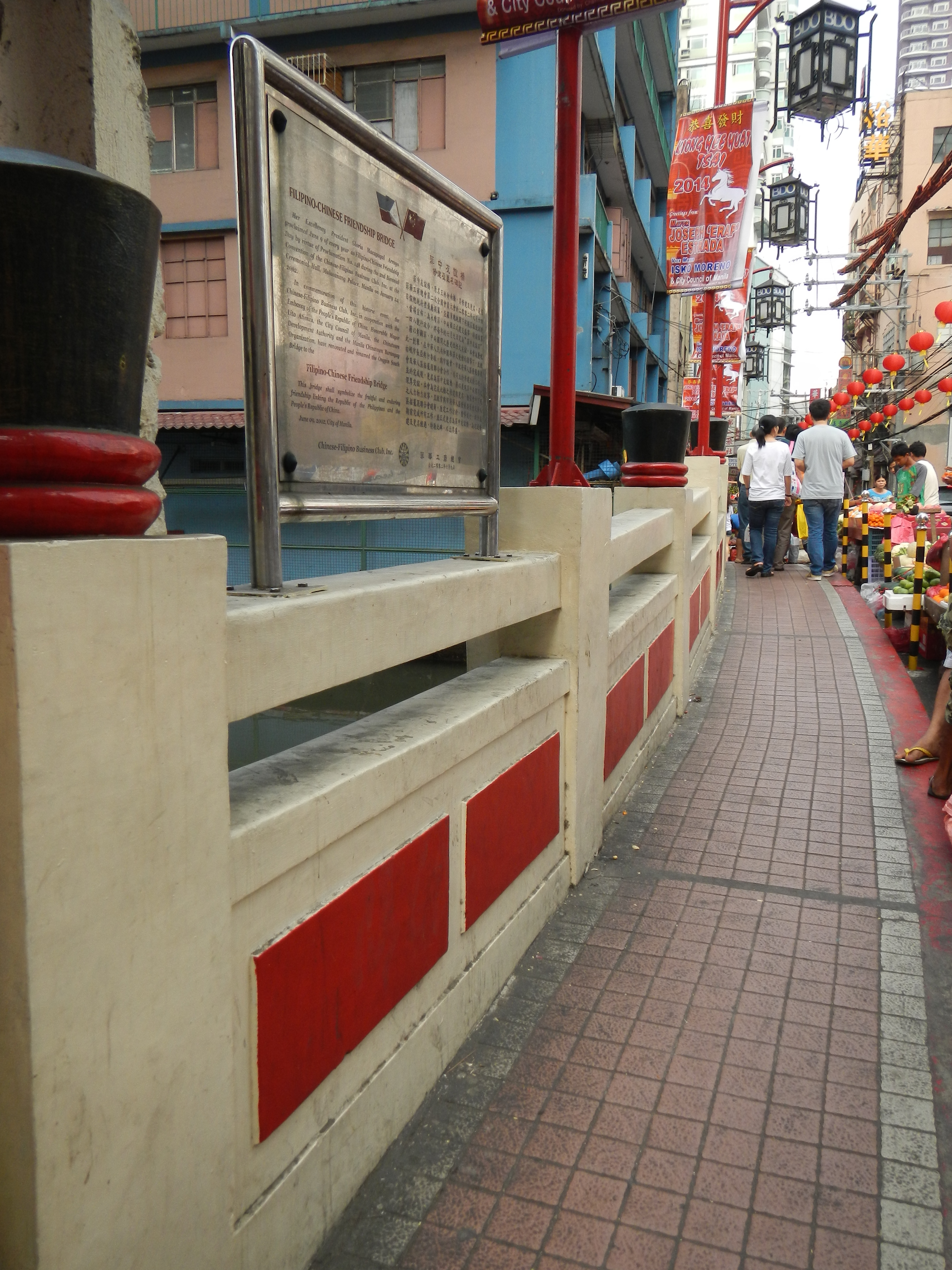
Welcome Arch, Manila Chinatown, Ongpin-Binondo, Manila, Filipino-Chinese Bridge of Friendship

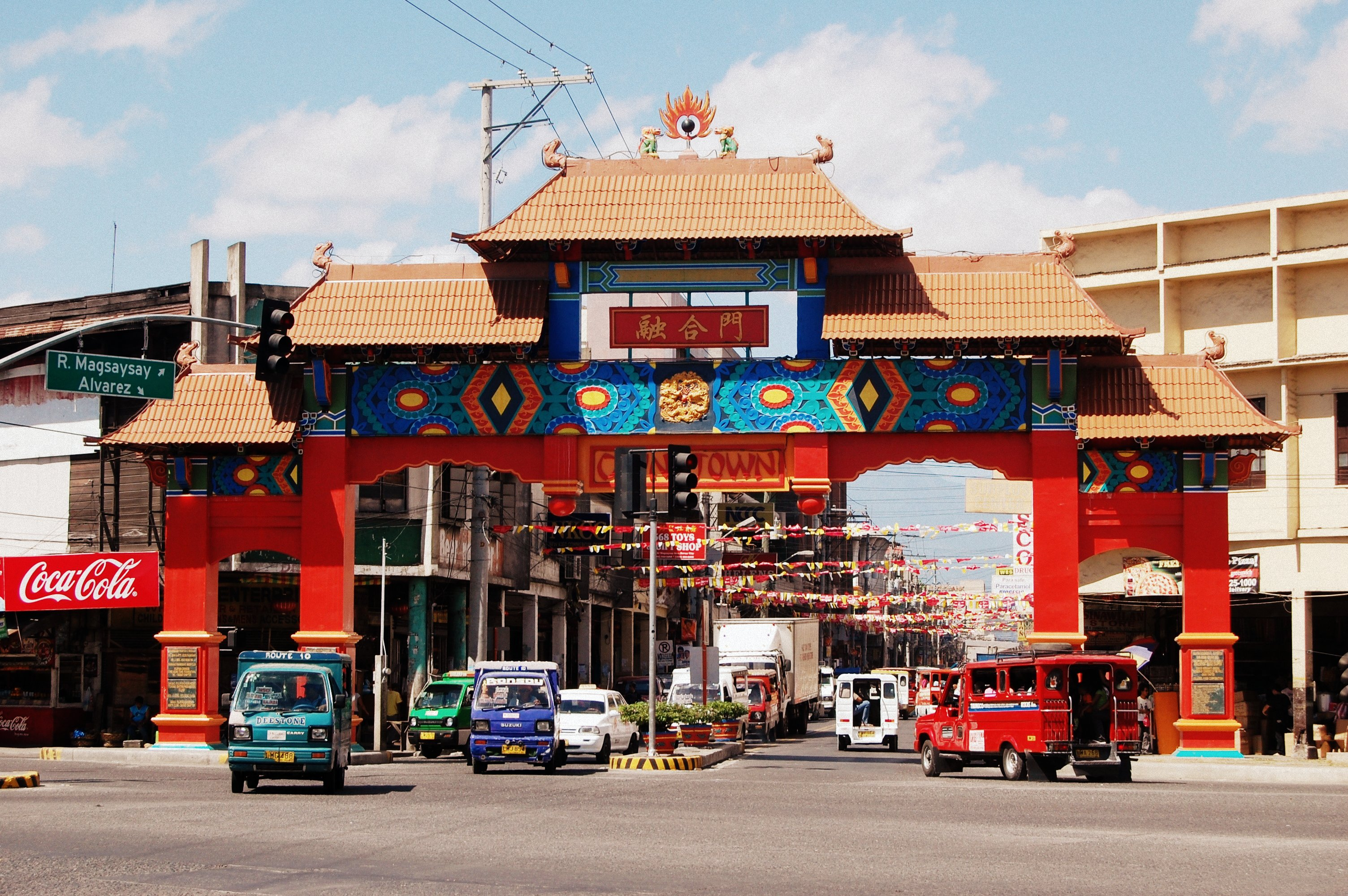
Davao Chinatown in Davao City is the biggest Chinatown in the Philippines and the only one in Mindanao.

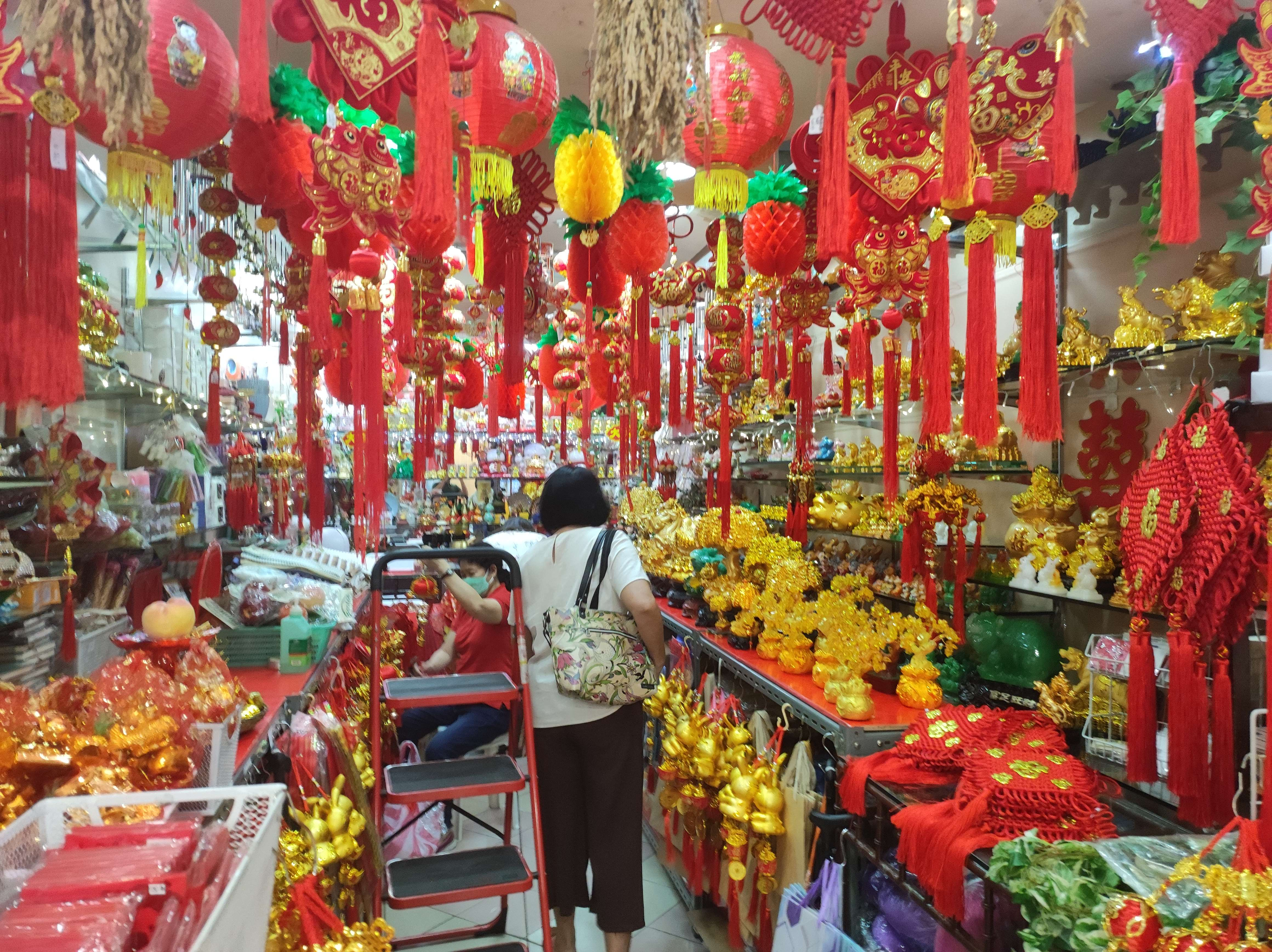
A Feng-Shui shop in a mall in Manila City selling Chinese charms, statues and images

=== Society ===
The Chinese Filipino are mostly business owners and their life centers mostly in the family business. These mostly small or medium enterprises play a significant role in the Philippine economy. A handful of these entrepreneurs run large companies and are respected as some of the most prominent business tycoons in the Philippines.

Chinese Filipinos attribute their success in business to frugality and hard work, Confucian values and their traditional Chinese customs and traditions. They are very business-minded and entrepreneurship is highly valued and encouraged among the young. Most Chinese Filipinos are urban dwellers. An estimated 50% of the Chinese Filipino live within Metro Manila, with the rest in the other major cities of the Philippines. In contrast with the Chinese mestizos, few Chinese are plantation owners. This was partly because, until recently, when the Chinese Filipino became Filipino citizens, the law prohibited non-citizens – which most Chinese were – from owning land.

=== Culture ===
As with other Southeast Asian nations, the Chinese community in the Philippines has become a repository of traditional Chinese culture common to unassimilated ethnic minorities throughout the world. Whereas in mainland China many cultural traditions and customs were suppressed or destroyed during the Cultural Revolution or simply regarded as old-fashioned nowadays, these traditions have remained largely preserved in the Philippines.

Many new cultural twists have evolved within the Chinese community in the Philippines, distinguishing it from other overseas Chinese communities in Southeast Asia. These cultural variations are highly evident during festivals such as Chinese New Year and Mid-Autumn Festival. The Chinese Filipino have developed unique customs pertaining to weddings, birthdays and funerary rituals.

==== Weddings ====
Wedding traditions of Chinese Filipinos, regardless of religious persuasion, usually involve identification of the dates of supplication or pamamanhikan (kiu-hun), engagement (ting-hun) and wedding (kan-chhiu) adopted from Filipino customs. In addition, feng shui based on the birthdates of the couple, as well as of their parents and grandparents may also be considered. Certain customs found among Chinese Filipinos include a solemn tea ceremony during supplication (kiu‑hun) held in the bridegroom's house, egg noodles (misua), and the giving of red packets or envelopes containing money, commonly referred to as an ang‑pao.

During the supplication ceremony, pregnant women and recently engaged couples are forbidden from attending. Engagement (ting-hun) quickly follows, where the bride enters the ceremonial room walking backward and turned three times before being allowed to see the groom. A welcome drink consisting of red-colored juice is given to the couple, quickly followed by the exchange of gifts for both families and the wedding tea ceremony, where the bride serves the groom's family and vice versa. The engagement reception consists of sweet tea soup and misua, both of which symbolize long-lasting relationships.

Before the wedding, the groom is expected to provide the matrimonial bed in the future couple's new home. A baby born under the Chinese sign of the Dragon may be placed in the bed to ensure fertility. He is also tasked with delivering the wedding gown to his bride's sister on the day prior to the wedding, as it is considered ill fortune for the groom to see the bride on that day. For the bride, she prepares an initial batch of personal belongings (ke-chheng) to be taken to her new home, wrapped and labeled with the Chinese characters for sang-hi. On the wedding date, the bride wears a red robe emblazoned with the emblem of a dragon prior to wearing the bridal gown, to which a pair of sang-hi (English: marital happiness) coin is sewn. Before leaving her home, the bride then throws a fan bearing the Chinese characters for sang-hi toward her mother to preserve harmony within the bride's family upon her departure. Most of the wedding ceremony then follows Catholic or Protestant traditions.

Post-wedding rituals include the two single brothers or relatives of the bride giving the couple a wa-hoe set, which is a bouquet of flowers with an umbrella and a sewing kit, for which the bride gives an ang-pao in return. After three days, the couple then visits the bride's family, upon which a pair of sugar cane branches are given, which is a symbol of good luck and vitality among the Hokkien people.

==== Births and birthdays ====
Birthday traditions of Chinese Filipinos involve large banquet receptions, always featuring noodles (Note: Filipinos usually cook and serve pansit noodles on birthdays to wish for long life.) and round-shaped desserts. All the relatives of the birthday celebrant are expected to wear red clothing which symbolize respect for the celebrant. Wearing clothes with a darker hue is forbidden and considered bad luck. During the reception, relatives offer ang paos (red packets containing money) to the birthday celebrant, especially if he is still unmarried. For older celebrants, boxes of egg noodles (misua) and eggs on which red paper is placed are given.

Births of babies are not celebrated, and they are usually given pet names, which the infant keeps until he/she reaches one year of age. The Philippine custom of circumcision is widely practiced within the Chinese Filipino community regardless of religion, albeit at a lesser rate as compared to native Filipinos. First birthdays are celebrated with much pomp and pageantry, and grand receptions are hosted by the child's paternal grandparents.

==== Funerals and burials ====
Funerary traditions of Chinese Filipinos mirror those found in Southern Fujian. A unique tradition of many Chinese Filipino families is the hiring of professional mourners which is alleged to hasten the ascent of a dead relative's soul into Heaven. This belief particularly mirrors the merger of traditional Chinese beliefs with the Catholic religion.

=== Subcultures ===
Most of the Chinese mestizos, especially the landed gentry trace their ancestry to the Spanish era. They are the "First Chinese" or Sangley whose descendants nowadays are mostly integrated into Philippine society. Most are from Zhangzhou, Fujian, in China, with a minority coming from Guangdong. They have embraced a Hispanized Filipino culture since the 17th century. After the end of Spanish rule, their descendants, the Chinese mestizos, managed to invent a cosmopolitan mestizo culture coupled with an extravagant Mestizo de Sangley lifestyle, intermarrying either with native Filipinos or with Spanish mestizos.

The largest group of Chinese in the Philippines are the "Second Chinese", who are descendants of migrants in the first half of the 20th century, between the anti-Qing 1911 Revolution in China and the Chinese Civil War. This group accounts for most of the "full-blooded" Chinese. They are almost entirely from Fujian Province.

The "Third Chinese" are the second largest group of Chinese, the recent immigrants from mainland China, after the reform and opening up of the 1980s. Generally, the "Third Chinese" are the most entrepreneurial and have not totally lost their Chinese identity in its purest form and seen by some "Second Chinese" as a business threat. Meanwhile, continuing immigration from mainland China further enlarges this group.

=== Civic organizations ===
Don Enrique T. Yuchengco Hall at De La Salle University.

Aside from their family businesses, Chinese Filipinos are active in Chinese-oriented civic organizations related to education, health care, public safety, social welfare and public charity. As most Chinese Filipinos are reluctant to participate in politics and government, they have instead turned to civic organizations as their primary means of contributing to the general welfare of the Chinese community. Beyond the traditional family and clan associations, Chinese Filipinos tend to be active members of numerous alumni associations holding annual reunions for the benefit of their Chinese Filipino secondary schools.

Outside of secondary schools catering to Chinese Filipinos, some Chinese Filipinos businessmen have established charitable foundations that aim to help others and at the same time minimize tax liabilities. Notable ones include the Gokongwei Brothers Foundation, Metrobank Foundation, Tan Yan Kee Foundation, Angelo King Foundation, Jollibee Foundation, Alfonso Yuchengco Foundation, Cityland Foundation, etc. Some Chinese Filipino benefactors have also contributed to the creation of several centers of scholarship in prestigious Philippine Universities, including the John Gokongwei School of Management at Ateneo de Manila, the Yuchengco Center at De La Salle University, and the Ricardo Leong Center of Chinese Studies at Ateneo de Manila. Coincidentally, both Ateneo and La Salle enroll a large number of Chinese-Filipino students. In health care, Chinese Filipinos were instrumental in establishing and building medical centers that cater for the Chinese community such as the Chinese General Hospital and Medical Center, the Metropolitan Medical Center, Chong Hua Hospital and the St. Luke's Medical Center, Inc., one of Asia's leading health care institutions. In public safety, Teresita Ang See's Kaisa, a Chinese-Filipino civil rights group, organized the Citizens Action Against Crime and the Movement for the Restoration of Peace and Order at the height of a wave of anti-Chinese kidnapping incidents in the early 1990s. In addition to fighting crime against Chinese, Chinese Filipinos have organized volunteer fire brigades all over the country, reportedly the best in the nation. that cater to the Chinese community. In arts and culture, the Bahay Tsinoy and the Yuchengco Museum were established by Chinese Filipinos to showcase the arts, culture and history of the Chinese.

=== Ethnic Chinese Filipinos' perceptions of non-Chinese Filipinos ===
Non-Chinese Filipinos were initially referred to as huan-á (番仔) by ethnic Chinese Filipinos in the Philippines. It is also used in other Southeast Asian countries such as Malaysia, Singapore and Indonesia by Hokkien-speaking ethnic Chinese to refer to peoples of Malay ancestry. In Taiwan, it was also used but it has become a taboo term with negative stigma since it was used to refer to indigenous Taiwanese aboriginals and the Japanese during the Japanese occupation of Taiwan. In mainland China, the term originally simply meant “foreigner,” though at times it could also carry a derogatory sense, since sometimes it was negatively connoted to “barbarian” or “outsider,” especially toward neighboring non‑Chinese peoples. For centuries it was the predominant term for non‑Spanish individuals, but today its meaning varies depending on the speaker's perceptions and cultural background; in the Philippines, for instance, it now mostly refers plainly to any non‑Chinese Filipinos, especially native Filipinos. When speaking Hokkien, most older Chinese Filipinos still use the term, while younger Chinese Filipinos may sometimes instead use the term Hui-li̍p-pin lâng (菲律賓儂), which directly means, "Philippine person" or simply "Filipino". This itself brings complications though as Chinese Filipinos themselves are Filipinos too, born and raised in the Philippines often with families of multiple generations carrying Filipino citizenship.

Some Chinese Filipinos perceive the government and authorities to be unsympathetic to the plight of the ethnic Chinese, especially in terms of frequent kidnapping for ransom during the late 1990s. Currently, most of the third or fourth generation Chinese Filipinos generally view the non-Chinese Filipino people and government positively, and have largely forgotten about the historical oppression of the ethnic Chinese. They are also most likely to consider themselves as just being "Filipino" and focus on the Philippines, rather than on just being "Chinese" and being associated with China (PRC) or Taiwan (ROC).

Some Chinese Filipinos believe racism still exists toward their community among a minority of non-Chinese Filipinos, who the Chinese Filipinos refer to as "pâi-huâ" (排華) in Philippine Hokkien. Organizations belonging to this category include the Laspip Movement, headed by Adolfo Abadeza, as well as the Kadugong Liping Pilipino, founded by Armando "Jun" Ducat Jr. that stirred tensions around the late 1990s. Also due in part to racial or chauvinistic views from Mainland Chinese towards native Filipinos or Filipinos in general in the 1980s after Filipinos became in demand in the international work force, some racial tendencies of mainland Chinese brought about by Han chauvinism against native Filipinos have intensified in the 21st century. Many Mainland Chinese have branded the Philippines as a "gullible nation of maids and banana sellers", amidst disputes in the South China Sea. Due to such racist remarks against native Filipinos, racism against mainland Chinese in mainland China and by extension, ethnic-Chinese in general such as Chinese Filipinos, later developed among certain native or mestizo Filipino communities as a form of backlash. During the COVID-19 pandemic in 2020, some Chinese Filipinos have also voiced concerns about Sinophobic sentiments that some non-Chinese Filipinos may carry against any ethnic Chinese, especially those from mainland China due to being the site of the first coronavirus outbreak, that may sometimes extend and generalize on Chinese Filipinos. Chinese Filipino organizations have discouraged the mainstream Filipino public from being discriminatory, particularly against Chinese nationals amid the global spread of COVID-19.

== Intermarriage ==
Chinese mestizos are persons of mixed Chinese and either Spanish or indigenous Filipino ancestry. Mestizos are thought to make up as much as 25% of the country's total population. A number of Chinese mestizos have surnames that reflect their heritage, mostly two or three syllables that have Chinese roots (e.g., the full name of a Chinese ancestor) with a Hispanized phonetic spelling.

During the Spanish colonial period, the Spanish authorities encouraged the Chinese male immigrants to convert to Catholicism. Those who converted got baptized and their names Hispanized, and were allowed to intermarry with indigenous Filipino women. The couple and their mestizo offspring became colonial subjects of the Spanish crown, and as such were granted several privileges and afforded numerous opportunities that were denied to the unconverted and non-citizen Chinese. Starting out as traders, many Chinese mestizo businesspeople branched out into land leasing, money-lending, and later, landholding.

Chinese mestizo men and women were encouraged to marry Spanish and indigenous women and men, by means of dowries, as part of a colonial policy to mix the different ethno-racial groups of the Philippines so as it would be impossible to expel the Spanish.

Today, "blood purity" is still of prime concern in most traditional Chinese Filipino families, especially pure-blooded Han ones. Many Chinese Filipinos who maintain traditional perspectives on marriage continue to uphold the belief that a Chinese Filipino can only be married to another fellow Chinese Filipino since marriages to a non-Han Chinese Filipino or any non-Han Chinese outsider is considered taboo and undesirable. The prospects and implications of the sustained trend of ongoing intermarriage between Chinese to native, mestizo Filipinos, and other outsiders, still continues to be shrouded in ambiguity, raising controversy, casting doubt, and posing uncertainty for all parties involved, even to this day. As the Chinese Filipino family structure is traditionally patriarchal, hence, it is the male that carries the last name of the family which also entails the pedigree and legacy of the family name itself. Marriages between Chinese Filipino men and native Filipinas or mestizas, or any outsider, was deemed more socially permissible than the other way around. In the case of the Chinese Filipina female marrying a native or mestizo Filipino or any outsider, it may incur several unwanted racial issues and tensions, especially on the side of the Chinese family.

In some instances, a member of a traditional Chinese Filipino family may be denied of his or her inheritance and likely to be disowned by his or her family for marrying an outsider without their consent. However, there are narrow exceptions in which intermarriage to a non-Chinese Filipino or any outsider would considered socially permissible provided that their family's socioeconomic background is well-off or influential.

On the other hand, modern Chinese Filipino families who exhibit more liberal cosmopolitan views and beliefs are generally more receptive to interracial marriage by allowing their children to marry native or mestizo Filipino or any non-Han Chinese outsider. Even with these changes in attitude and shifting perspectives towards miscegenation, many contemporary Chinese Filipino families would still by and large prefer that the Filipino or any non-Han Chinese outsider would have some or little Han Chinese ancestry, such as the descendants of Chinese mestizos dating back to the Spanish colonial period.

== Trade and industry ==
The Manila Stock Exchange is now pullulated with thousands of prospering Chinese-owned Filipino stock brokerage houses and publicly traded companies. Filipino investors of Chinese ancestry dominate the Manila Stock Exchange as they are estimated to control more than half of the publicly listed companies by market capitalization.

Chinese Filipinos collectively wield and demonstrate a disproportionately high level of political and economic power relative to their small population size over the Filipino majority, while also playing a role in maintaining the country's economic growth and development. Chinese Filipinos represent a disproportionately wealthy, market‑dominant minority. They form an ethnic community, as well as forming, by and large, an economic class – the commercial middle and upper class – in contrast to the less-wealthy indigenous Filipino working-class majority and underclass around them. Traditional Chinese enclaves have sprung up in major Philippine cities across the country, physically walled off from the less-wealthy indigenous Filipino people and guarded by heavily armed, private security forces. Though the contemporary Chinese Filipino community albeit remains insular, given their propensity to voluntarily segregate themselves from the indigenous Filipino populace through typically associating themselves with the Chinese community, their collective impacting presence nonetheless still remains felt throughout the country at large. In particular, their middleman minority status and economic influence — owing to their business acumen and investment practices — have prompted the community's acculturation into mainstream Filipino society and the maintenance of their exclusively unabashed distinctive cultural sense of ethnic identity, clannishness, community, kinship, nationalism, and socio-ethnic cohesion through clan associations.

The Chinese have had a significant presence in Filipino business and industry, having been at the forefront of controlling the economy of the Philippines for many centuries long before the Spanish and American colonial eras. Much before the Spanish conquest of the Philippines, Chinese merchants carried on trading activities with native communities along the coast of modern mainland China. By the time the Spanish arrived, the Chinese controlled all the commercial trading activities across the Philippines, serving as retailers, artisans, and food providers for various Spanish settlements. During the American colonial epoch, Chinese merchants controlled a significant percentage of the retail trade and internal commerce of the country. They predominated the retail trade and owned three-quarters of the 2500 rice mills interspersed along with the Filipino islands. Total resources of banking capital held by the Chinese was US$27 million in 1937 to a high of US$100 million in the estimated aggregate, making them second to the Americans in terms of total foreign capital investment held. Under Spanish rule, the Chinese were willing to engage in trade and venture into other business activities where Filipino entrepreneurs of Chinese ancestry were responsible for introducing sugar refining devices, new construction techniques, movable type printing, and bronze making into the Filipino economic landscape while also providing fishing, gardening, artisan, and other such trading services. Many poverty-stricken Filipinos of Chinese ancestry were drawn towards business ownership and investing as they were prohibited from owning land and saw the only path out of abject poverty was by going into commercial business, entrepreneurship, and investing as a sole recourse to alleviate themselves from extreme economic destitution and ameliorate the parlous state of their personal financial situations. Many Chinese‑born and Filipino‑raised entrepreneurs and investors have used their shrewd business instincts and entrepreneurial spirit to improve their financial situation, moving from poverty toward greater stability and opportunity. Assuming responsibility for their personal financial circumstances empowered and precipitated countless budding Filipino entrepreneurs of Chinese ancestry to become self-employed as dealers, distributors, hawkers, marketers, peddlers, producers, retailers, sellers, and vendors of variegated goods and services catered to the Spanish and American colonizers as well as the masses of indigenous Filipino consumers. During the first four decades of the 19th century, many Chinese were drawn by the economic opportunities created under American colonial influence. This encouraged them to build and secure their own areas of economic activity through entrepreneurship and investment. The implementation of a free trade policy between the Philippines and the United States allowed the Chinese to capitalize on the growth of a burgeoning Filipino consumer market. As a result, Filipino entrepreneurs and investors of Chinese ancestry were able to capture a significant market share across the country by expanding their commercial business activities in which they were the key players who ventured into then newly emerging industries such as industrial manufacturing and financial services. The American and Spanish colonizers who saw the indispensable benefit of the enterprising Chinese, harnessed their commercial expertise, contacts, capital, and presence to serve and protect their colonial economic interests. Chinese-owned sari-sari stores that cropped up all over the Philippines were utilized to distribute and supply American and cheap Chinese-made Filipino goods and raw materials with the finished products purposed for the eventual export to the American and other foreign markets overseas. The conspicuous presence of the Chinese in everyday areas of Filipino economic life led to tensions in the indigenous Filipino masses that manifested in the form of animosity, bitterness, envy, grievance, insecurity, and resentment.

Up until the 1970s, many of the Philippines's biggest corporations and commercial economic activities had long been under the control of the Americans and Spaniards. Since the 1970s, a significant shift has occurred in the commercial economic sector of the Philippines, whereby numerous Filipino enterprises previously owned by Americans and Spaniards came under the control of the Chinese, who have collectively emerged and established themselves as the country's most dominant economic force. Although the modern Chinese community in the Philippines amounts to 1 percent of the country's entire population, they are estimated to effectively control 60 to 70 percent of the modern Filipino economy. The enterprising Chinese minority, control the country's largest and most lucrative department stores, supermarkets, hotels, shopping malls, airlines, and fast-food restaurants in addition to all of its major financial services providers, banks and stock brokerage houses, as well as dominating the nation's wholesale distribution networks, shipping lines, banks, construction, textiles, real estate, personal computer, semiconductors, pharmaceutical, mass media, and industrial manufacturing industries. Filipinos of Chinese ancestry also control 40 percent of the Philippine's national corporate equity. They are also involved in the processing and distribution of pharmaceutical products. More than 1000 companies are involved in this industry, with most being small and medium-sized businesses amounting to an aggregate capitalization of ₱1.2 billion. They have also become prominent players in the Filipino mass media sector, as the Chinese control six out of the ten English-language newspapers in Manila, including the one with the largest daily circulation. Many retail stores and restaurants presided by Filipino owners with Chinese ancestry are regularly featured in Manila newspapers which often attract great public interest as such examples of high-profile business ownership are used to illustrate the Chinese community's strong economic influence that permeates throughout the country. The Chinese also dominate the Filipino telecommunications industry, where one of the current significant players in the Filipino telecom sector was the business taipan John Gokongwei, whose conglomerate JG Summit Holdings controlled 28 wholly owned subsidiaries with interests ranging from food and agro-industrial products, hotels, insurance agencies, financial services providers, electronic components, textiles and garment manufacturing, real estate, petrochemicals, power generation, printing, newspaper publishing, packaging materials, detergents, and cement mixing. Gokongwei's family firm is one of the six largest and most well-known Filipino conglomerates that has been under the hands of an owner of Chinese lineage. Gokongwei began his business career by starting out in food processing during the 1950s, venturing into textile manufacturing in the early 1970s, and then cornered the Filipino real estate development and hotel management industries by the end of the decade. In 1976, Gokongwei established Manila Midtown Hotels and has since then assumed the controlling interest of two other hotel chains, Cebu Midtown and Manila Galleria Suites respectively. In addition, Gokongwei has also made forays into the Filipino financial services sector as he expanded his business interests by investing in two Filipino banks, PCI Bank and Far East Bank, in addition to negotiating the acquisition of one of the Philippines's oldest newspapers, The Manila Times. Gokongwei's eldest daughter became publisher of the newspaper in December 1988 at the age of 28, around the same time her father acquired the paper from the Roceses, a Spanish Mestizo family. Of the 66 percent remaining part of the economy in the Philippines held by either Chinese or indigenous Filipinos, the Chinese control 35 percent of all total sales. Filipinos of Chinese ancestry control an estimated 50 to 60 percent of non-land share capital in the Philippines, and as much as 35 percent of total sales are attributed to the largest public and private firms owned by the Chinese. Many prominent Filipino companies that are Chinese-owned focus on diverse industry sectors such as semiconductors, chemicals, real estate, engineering, construction, fibre-optics, textiles, financial services, consumer electronics, food, and personal computers. A third of the top 500 companies publicly listed on the Philippine Stock Exchange are owned by Filipinos of Chinese ancestry. Of the top 1000 firms, Filipinos of Chinese ancestry control 36 percent of them and among the top 100 companies, 43 percent. Between 1978 and 1988, 146 of the country's 494 top companies were under Chinese ownership. Filipinos of Chinese ancestry are also estimated to control over one-third of the Philippines's 1000 largest corporations with the Chinese controlling 47 of the 68 locally owned companies publicly listed on the Manila Stock Exchange. In 1990, the Chinese controlled 25 percent of the top 100 businesses in the Philippines and by 2014, the share of top 100 firms owned by them grew to 41 percent. Filipino entrepreneurs of Chinese ancestry are also responsible for generating 55 percent of overall Filipino private commercial business activity across the country. In addition, Chinese-owned Filipino companies account for 66 percent of the sixty largest commercial entities. In 2008, among the top ten wealthiest Filipinos, 6 to 7 were of Chinese ancestry with Henry Sy Sr. having topped the list with an estimated net worth US$14.4 billion. In 2015, the top 4 wealthiest people in the Philippines (with 9 being pure-blooded Han Chinese in addition to 10 out of the top 15) were of Chinese ancestry. In 2019, 15 of the 17 Filipino billionaires were of Chinese ancestry.

Filipinos of Chinese ancestry exert a considerable influential foothold across the Filipino industrial manufacturing sector. With respect to delineating the parameters by industry distribution, Chinese-owned manufacturing establishments account for a third of the entirety of the industrial manufacturing sector. The majority of industrial manufacturing establishments that produce the processing of coconut products, flour, food products, textiles, plastic products, footwear, glass, as well as heavy industry products such as metals, steel, industrial chemicals, paper products, paints, leatherwork, garments, sugar refining, timber processing, construction materials, food and beverages, rubber, plastics, semiconductors, and personal computers are controlled by Filipino entrepreneurs of Chinese ancestry. In the secondary industry, 75 percent of the country's 2500 rice mills were Chinese-owned. Chinese Filipino entrepreneurs were also dominant in wood processing, and accounted for over 10 percent of the capital invested in the lumber industry and controlled 85 percent of it, as well as accounted for 40 percent of the industry's annual output propagated through their extensive control of nearly all the sawmills throughout the country. Emerging import-substituting light industries induced the active participation and ownership of Chinese entrepreneurs being involved in various several salt works in addition to a large number of small and medium-sized producers engaged in food processing as well as the production of leather and tobacco goods. The Chinese also hold enormous sway over the Filipino food processing industry with approximately 200 outlets being involved in this sector alone predominating the eventual export of their finished products to Hong Kong, Singapore, and Taiwan. More than 200 Chinese-owned companies are also involved in the production of paper, paper products, fertilizers, cosmetics, rubber products, and plastics. By the early 1960s, the Chinese presence in the manufacturing sector became even more significant. Of the industrial manufacturing establishments that employed 10 or more workers, 35 percent were Chinese-owned and among 284 enterprises employing more than 100 workers, 37 percent were likewise Chinese-owned. Of the 163 domestic industrial manufacturing companies operating throughout the Philippines, 80 were Chinese-owned and included the manufacturing of coconut oil, food products, tobacco, textiles, plastic products, footwear, glass, and certain types of metals such as tubes and pipes, wire rods, nails, bolts, and containers. In 1965, the Chinese controlled 32 percent of the country's top industrial manufacturing outlets. Of the 259 industrial manufacturing establishments belonging to the top 1000 that operated throughout the entire country, the Chinese owned 33.6 percent of the top manufacturing companies as well as 43.2 percent of the top commercial manufacturing outlets in 1980. By 1986, the Chinese controlled 45 percent of the country's top 120 domestic manufacturing companies. These manufacturing establishments are mainly involved in the production of tobacco and cigarettes, soap and cosmetics, textiles and rubber footwear.

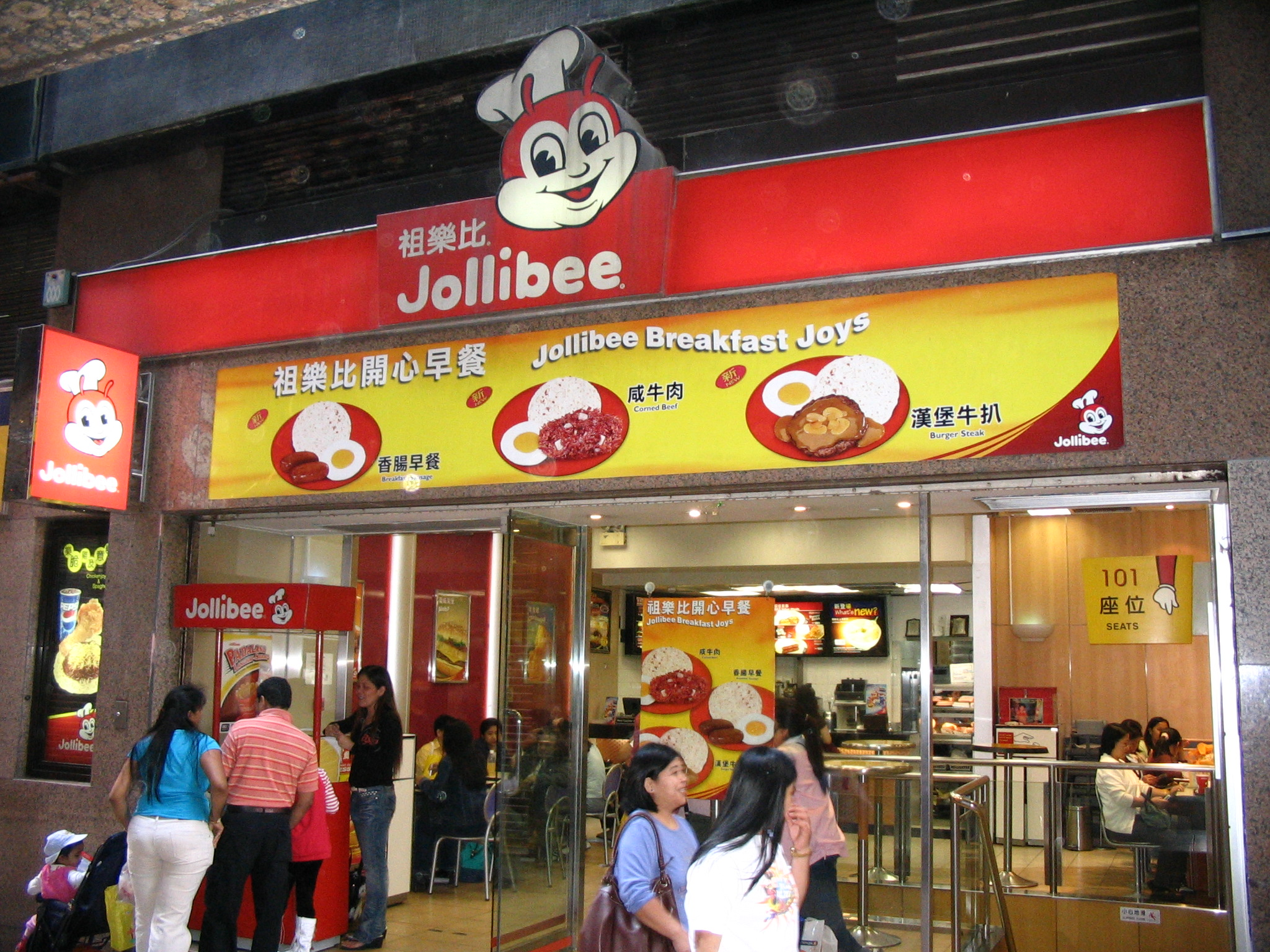
The Filipino fast food joint, Jollibee, which makes Filipino-style hamburgers was founded by Tony Tan Caktiong, a Filipino entrepreneur of Chinese ancestry. The outlet today continues to remain as one of the country's most famous and beloved fast food franchises.

Today, Filipinos of Chinese ancestry control all of the Philippines's largest and most lucrative department stores, supermarkets, and fast-food restaurants. In the fast-food industry, Filipino restaurateurs of Chinese ancestry have been behind the Philippines's biggest fast-food restaurant franchises. A wave of homegrown restaurant chains such as Chowking, Greenwich Pizza, Mang Inasal, Red Ribbon in addition to the mainland China-based establishment Yonghe Dawang (永和大王) have made headway into the Filipino restaurant industry with their various constituent outlets being cropped up across various cities around the country. There are roughly 3000 fast-food outlets and restaurants controlled by Filipino restaurateurs of Chinese ancestry around the country. Eating establishments specializing in Chinese cuisine have attracted an influx of foreign capital investments from Hong Kong and Taiwan. The banker and business taipan George Ty was responsible for securing and franchising the rights of the famous publicly traded American hamburger franchise McDonald's across the Philippines and the Jollibee fast-food joint, whose founder Tony Tan Caktiong is of Chinese ancestry. Jollibee's popularity around the country has since then led to the expansion of its corporate presence throughout the world by establishing subsidiaries in the Middle East, Hong Kong, Guam, and other Southeast Asian countries such as Brunei and Indonesia. The chain has since evolved into the Jollibee Foods Corporation with the company having gradually expanded its corporate operating presence throughout mainland China as evidenced by its foreign acquisition of the Chinese fast food chain Dim Sum in 2008. In the beverage sector, San Miguel Corporation is among the Philippines's most prominent beverage providers. The company was founded in 1851 by Enrique María Barretto de Ycaza y Esteban and is responsible for supplying the country's entire beverage needs. Two Chinese-owned Filipino beverage companies, namely Lucio Tan's Asia Brewery and John Gokongwei's Universal Robina, along with several lesser-known beverage companies are also now competing with each other to capture the largest share in the Filipino beverage market.

In 1940, Filipinos of Chinese ancestry were estimated to control 70 percent of the country's entire retail trade and 75 percent of the nation's rice mills. By 1948, the economic standing of the Chinese community began to elevate even further allowing them to wield considerable influence by expanding their commercial business presence across the Filipino retail industry. The Chinese community exercised a considerable percentage of the total commercial investment, including the command of 55 percent of the retail trade and 85 percent of the country's lumber industry at this time. After the end of the Second Sino-Japanese war, Chinese Filipinos controlled 85 percent of the nation's retail trade. The Chinese also presided over 40 percent of the retailing imports coupled with substantial controlling interests in banking, oil refining, sugar milling, cement, tobacco, flour milling, glass, dairy farming, automobile manufacturing, and consumer electronics. Although the Filipino Hacienderos owned an extensive array of businesses, Filipinos of Chinese ancestry greatly augmented their economic power coinciding with the pro-market reforms of the late 1980s and 1990s initiated by the Marcos administration. As a result, the Chinese gradually increased their commanding role in the domestic commercial retail sector over time by acting as an intermediary in connecting Chinese-owned Filipino retailers to the masses of indigenous Filipino consumers through the exchange of various goods and services. The Chinese Filipino business community accomplished such commercial feats as a tight-knit group in an enclosed system via vertical integration by setting up their own supply chains, distribution networks, locating key competitors, making use of geographical coverage, attributes and characteristics, business strategies, staff recruitment, store proliferation, and establishing their own independent trade organizations. Chinese-owned Filipino retail outlets also exercised a vast disproportionate share of several local goods such as rice, lumber products, and alcoholic drinks. Some Chinese Filipino merchant traders even branched into retailing these products in addition to rice milling, logging, saw-milling, distillery, tobacco, coconut oil processing, footwear making, and agricultural processing. Over time, the domestic Filipino economy began to broaden by the multitudinous expansion of commercial business activities long held by the Chinese which also ushered in new forms of entrepreneurship with the Chinese having assiduously devoted and directed their corporate efforts, energies, and capital into cultivating new industries and growth areas over other well-established and matured sectors.

Since the 1950s, Filipino entrepreneurs of Chinese ancestry have controlled the entirety of the Filipino retail industry. Many small, medium, and large enterprises in the retail sector are now under Chinese hands; having been at the forefront of the development of the sector. From the 1970s onward, Filipino entrepreneurs of Chinese ancestry have re-established themselves as the dominant players in the Filipino retail industry with the community having achieved a collective corporate feat of presiding over an estimated 8500 Chinese-owned retail and wholesale outlets that predominate across various metropolitan areas the country. On a microscopic scale, the Hokkien community have a proclivity to run capital intensive businesses such as banks, commercial shipping lines, rice mills, dry goods, and general stores while the Cantonese gravitate towards hotels, restaurants, and laundromats. Filipino entrepreneurs of Chinese ancestry control 35 percent to upwards of two-thirds of the domestic sales among the country's 67 largest commercial retail outlets. By the 1980s, Filipino entrepreneurs of Chinese ancestry began to expand their business activities by venturing into large-scale retailing.

Chinese-owned Filipino retail outlets today are among the single largest owners of department store chains in the Philippines with one prominent example being Rustan's, which is one of the country's most prestigious department store brands. Other prime retailers such as Shoe Mart owned by Henry Sy and John Gokongwei's Robinson's percolated rapidly throughout major cities around the country, with the products that they retailed having made their way into the shopping malls situated across various parts of the Manila Metropolitan area. Another prominent business figure in Philippines's retail industry is the Fujian-born and Filipino taipan, Lucio Tan. Tan began his business career in cigarette distribution and later rose to prominence in Filipino business circles after leading the corporate takeover of General Bank and Trust Company in 1965, later renaming it as the Allied Bank. Tan, whose flagship cigarette manufacturing company Fortune Tobacco (now a Philippine affiliate of Philip Morris International) controls the largest market share of cigarette distribution in the country and has since emerged as of one richest men in the Philippines. Aside from taking over the Philippines's tobacco distribution networks, Tan has since parlayed his business interests into a corporate conglomerate of his own LT Group Inc. His corporate empire presides over a portfolio of diversified business interests including chemicals, sports, education, brewing, financial services, real estate, hotels (Century Park Hotel), in addition to his company having purchased a majority controlling interest in PAL, one of the Philippines's largest airlines. In terms of industry distribution, small and medium size Chinese-owned retailers account for half of the Philippines retail trade, with 49.45 percent of the retail sector alone being controlled by Henry Sy's Shoemart, and the remaining share of the retail trade being dominated by a few larger Chinese-owned Filipino umbrella retail outlets that include thousands of smaller retail subsidiaries. Sy built his business empire from scratch out of his Shoe Mart department store chain, and has since made forays into banking and real estate development after purchasing a controlling interest of Banco de Oro, a private commercial bank as well as acquiring a substantial block of China Banking Corporation, another privately Chinese-owned Filipino commercial bank and wealth management house whose services are specifically catered and tailored to the banking and financing needs of up-and-coming Chinese Filipino entrepreneurs.

From small trade cooperatives clustered by hometown pawnbrokers, Filipinos of Chinese ancestry would go on to establish and incorporate the largest financial services institutions in the country. They have played an important role in the development of the Filipino financial sector as they dominated the country's financial services domain and have had a presence in the country's banking industry since the early part of the 20th century. The two earliest Chinese-founded Filipino banks were Chinabank and the Mercantile Bank of China, established in 1920 and 1924 respectively. Dee C. Chuan, one of the most high-profile Filipino businessmen of Chinese ancestry at the time, played a key role in initiating the establishment of Chinabank, as he was adamant in establishing a financial services institution that was specifically tailored to serve the needs of the Chinese Filipino business community. Following the country's rapid parallel economic shift at the time towards the burgeoning industrial manufacturing sector, the Chinese business community was prompted to concurrently venture into the nascent banking and financial services sector. In 1956, there were four Chinese-owned Filipino banks, nine by 1971, sixteen in 1974, with the Chinese holding majority stakes in 10 of the 26 private commercial Filipino banks by the early 1990s. Today, the overwhelming majority of the Philippines's principal banks have come under Chinese ownership with Filipinos of Chinese ancestry owning six of the top ten banks in the country. Of these six banks, the Chinese collectively control 63 percent of the aggregate assets among the top ten banks in the country. Chinese-controlled Filipino banks include the China Banking Corporation, Bank of the Philippine Islands, Philippine Savings Bank, the Philippine National Bank (owned by LT Group, Inc.), and most notably Metrobank Group that was owned by banker and businessman George Ty, which has been the country's second-largest financial services conglomerate.

Lesser-known private commercial banks established in the 1950s and 1960s are also owned and controlled by Filipinos of Chinese ancestry. The lone exception of a non-Chinese and non-foreign owned Filipino bank was the Spanish Filipino Lopez-owned Philippine Commercial International Bank, which has since been taken over by Henry Sy's holding and investment company SM Investments Corporation, and later re-emerged itself as a subsidiary of Banco de Oro in 2007. Banco De Oro, which saw its beginnings as a savings bank in 1980, took itself into prominence in the Filipino financial services sector when it subsumed Equitable-PCI Bank in July 2005 under the aegis of Sy. With Sy having assumed majority ownership of Banco de Oro, a commercial bank as well as acquiring a 14 percent stake in the China Banking Corporation, he also took a controlling interest in the Philippine National Bank, and 7 percent of the Far East Bank. By 1970, among the Philippines's five largest banks holding almost 50 percent of all assets in the industry, namely China Banking Corporation, Citibank, the Bank of the Philippine Islands, Equitable PCI Bank, in addition to the formerly government-owned Philippine National Bank came under the control of Chinese shareholders. Among the top ten private commercial banks in 1993, Chinese-Filipino business families were in full control of four of them, namely the Metropolitan Bank, Allied Bank, Equitable Banking, and China Banking. George Ty's Metropolitan Bank generated the industry's highest share of gross revenues and net income in addition to holding the Filipino banking industry's largest amount of total assets during that year. In 1993, Chinese-owned Filipino banks controlled 38.43 percent of the total assets in the private Filipino commercial banking sector. By 1995, banks owned by Filipinos of Chinese ancestry had captured an even greater market share of the Philippines's financial services sector after the formerly government-owned Philippine National Bank was partially privatized, along with four of the top five banks that were substantially controlled by Chinese shareholders claiming 48 percent of all bank assets and over 60 percent of all those held by private domestic commercial banks.

At the turn of the 20th century, major realignments in the Filipino banking sector led to numerous mergers and acquisitions as ownership structures of private commercial banks shifted. This sparked a flurry of mergers and acquisitions that continued to consolidate the Chinese community's grip on the Philippines's private commercial banking sector. Among the most notable transactions that took place was George Ty's Metrobank, which at this time acquired Asian Bank and Global Business Bank and with Lucio Tan in 1992 having assumed a 67 percent controlling ownership of the privatized Philippine National Bank. Tan has since then solidified a commanding presence in the Filipino banking sector towards the beginning of the new millennium when he continued his corporate onslaught through the buyout, absorption, and subsequent merger of Philippine National Bank with his own bank, Allied Bank. Fellow taipan John Gokongwei was also a major shareholder in the Far East Bank, Philippine Commercial and International Bank, and controlled a 19 percent stake in the Philippine Trust Company. During the 1999 Filipino banking mergers and acquisition frenzy, Gokongwei realized an immense windfall gain following the high-profit sale of his shares in PCIB and the Far East Bank in the process. In terms of industry distribution, Chinese-owned firms account for a quarter of the Filipino financial services sector. Today, the overwhelming majority of the Philippines's nine principal banks in addition to the formerly state-owned Philippine National Bank are now under the ownership of Chinese shareholders, including the Allied Banking Corporation, Banco de Oro Group, China Banking Corporation (Chinabank), East West Banking Corporation, Metrobank group, Philippine Trust Company (Philtrust Bank), Rizal Commercial Banking group, Security Bank Corporation (Security Bank) and the United Coconut Planters Bank. Most of these banks comprise a larger part of an umbrella owned family conglomerate with assets exceeding ₱100 billion. The total combined assets of all the Philippines's commercial banks under Chinese ownership account for 25.72 percent of all the aggregate assets in the entire Filipino commercial banking system. Among the Philippines's 35 banks, shareholders of Chinese ancestry on average control 30 percent of the total banking equity. There are also 23 Filipino insurance agencies that are Chinese-owned, with some branches operating overseas and in Hong Kong.

Filipinos of Chinese ancestry also wield significant influence over the Philippines's real estate sector with much of the modern industry being built through their extended participation in entrepreneurship and investment. The line of revenue-generating business and income-producing investment opportunities that enabled the Chinese to expand their economic presence into the Filipino real estate industry emerged when they were finally conferred full-fledged Filipino citizenship during the Martial Law Period and gained the privilege to buy, sell, and own land. Initially, the Chinese were not allowed to own land until formally acquiring Filipino citizenship in the 1970s, which eventually permitted them to be granted with the same economic rights, freedoms, and privileges as their indigenous Filipino counterparts. In the aftermath of such a historically significant legal change that occurred throughout the Filipino geopolitical landscape at this time, its implications soon led to an upsurge of massive land purchases throughout the country predominated by Filipino investors of Chinese ancestry which started by the next decade following the country's political transition from a dictatorship to a democracy. The acquisition of Filipino citizenship in the 1970s allowed the Chinese to further expand their economic presence by entering into large‑scale commercial real‑estate investments and other property ventures, which strengthened their position in the Filipino real‑estate market and elevated their socioeconomic standing. Since the 1980s, Filipino businessmen and investors of Chinese ancestry have cornered much of the Philippines's real estate investment markets, land, and property development sectors, when much of the industry's grasp had long been held by the Spaniards. Chinese-owned Filipino real estate companies have acquired large areas of prime commercial and residential real estate across Metro Manila and other urban Filipino cities, utilized for the exploitative purposes of profit through commercial property development and investment.

Since 1990, the Filipino real estate markets have been primarily controlled by both Chinese and non-Chinese Filipino entrepreneurs and investors alike, competing for lucrative opportunities in key property developments and prime real estate investments across the country. The competitive landscape has pushed these entrepreneurs and investors to position themselves to capitalize on the promising potential for profitability. It has been driven by cash‑flow generation and capital appreciation in rapidly expanding real‑estate markets around the country, leading to intense competition among stakeholders. Presently, many of the biggest real estate development operators in the Philippines are owned by Filipino businessmen and investors of Chinese ancestry following the exodus of the Spanish Filipino Mestizo landowning elites such as the Araneta's, Ayala's, Lopez's, and the Ortiga's. Of the 500 real estate companies operating in the Philippines, 120 are owned by Filipinos of Chinese ancestry with the firms mostly specializing in real estate investment, land, and property development in addition to construction, having much of their commercial presence concentrated in the Manila Metropolitan area. Well-known real estate companies controlled by some of the Philippines's most high-profile businessmen and investors include SMDC owned by the Sy's, Robinsons Land by the Gokongwei's, Megaworld Properties & Holdings Inc. which is controlled by Andrew Tan, Filinvest that is commanded by the Gotianun's, and DoubleDragon Properties, presided by businessman Edgar Sia II of Mang Inasal fame. Large scale commercial real estate projects such as the Eton Centris in Pinyahan, the Shangri-La Plaza in Mandaluyong and the Tagaytay Highlands Golf Club and Resort development in Tagaytay City are examples of such joint projects undertaken by Filipino real estate developers of Chinese ancestry in cooperation with other fellow Overseas Chinese dealmakers operating throughout the Southeast Asian real estate markets. These corporate partnerships were largely forged by Overseas Chinese business tycoons such as the investor Liem Sioe Liong, businessman Robert Kuok and dealmakers Andrew Gotianun, Henry Sy, George Ty and Lucio Tan. Besides being responsible for leading the development and growth of the Philippines's modern real estate industry, both Sy and Tan have been generous patrons of the mainland Chinese on top of the local Chinese Filipino community. They have also actively invested in the economic development and revitalization of their ancestral hometowns back in China, with Sy constructing supermalls in Chengdu, Chongqing, and Suzhou and Tan developing a 30-story banking center in Xiamen.

The Chinese also pioneered the Filipino shipping industry which eventually turned into a major industry sector as a means of transporting goods cheaply and quickly between the islands. Filipino entrepreneurs of Chinese ancestry have remained dominant in the Philippines's maritime shipping and sea transport industry as it was one of the few efficient methods of transporting goods cheaply and quickly across the country, with the Philippines geographically being an archipelago, comprising more than 1000 islands and inlets. There are 12 Filipino business families of Chinese ancestry engaged in inter-island transport and shipping, particularly with the shipping of food products requiring refrigeration amounting to an aggregate capitalization of ₱10 billion. Taiwanese expatriate investors have participated in various joint ventures by opening up new shipping lanes on the route between Manila and Cebu. Prominent shipping lines owned by Filipinos of Chinese ancestry include Cokaliong Shipping Lines, Gothong Lines, Lite Shipping Corporation, Sulpicio Lines which was infamously associated with a tragedy that led to the deaths of thousands, and Trans-Asia Shipping Lines. One enterprising and pioneering Filipino businessman of Chinese ancestry was William Chiongbian, who established William Lines in 1949, which by the end of 1993, became the most profitable inter-island Filipino shipping line ranking first in terms of gross revenue generated as well as net income among the country's seven biggest shipping companies at that time. Currently, the Filipino inter-island shipping industry is dominated by four Chinese-owned shipping lines led by William Chiongbian's William Lines. Likewise, Filipinos of Chinese ancestry also own all of the major airlines in the country, including the flagship carrier Philippine Airlines, AirphilExpress, Cebu Pacific, South East Asian Airlines, Air Manila and Zest Air.

As Filipino businesspeople of Chinese ancestry became more financially prosperous, they often coalesced their financial resources and pooled large amounts of seed capital together to forge joint business ventures with expatriate Mainland and Overseas Chinese businessmen and investors from all over the world. Like other Chinese-owned businesses operating throughout the Southeast Asian markets, Chinese-owned businesses in the Philippines often link up with Greater Chinese and other Overseas Chinese businesses and networks across the globe to focus on new business opportunities to collaborate and concentrate on. Common industry sectors of focus include real estate, engineering, textiles, consumer electronics, financial services, food, semiconductors, and chemicals. Besides sharing a common ancestry, cultural, linguistic, and familial ties, many Filipino entrepreneurs and investors of Chinese ancestry are particular strong adherents of the Confucian paradigm of interpersonal relationships when doing business with each other, as the Chinese believe that the underlying source for entrepreneurial and investment success relies on the nurturing of personal relationships. Moreover, Filipino businesses that are Chinese-owned form a part of the larger bamboo network, an umbrella business network of Overseas Chinese companies operating in the markets of Greater China and Southeast Asia that share cultural ties. The rapid growth of Chinese Filipino business tycoons and investors have allowed them to expand their traditional corporate activities beyond the Philippines to forge international partnerships with increasing numbers of expatriate Mainland and Overseas Chinese investors on a global scale. Instead of diverting excess profits towards discretionary spending, many Filipino businesspeople of Chinese ancestry are known for their frugal approach, avoiding lavish extravagances and frivolous conspicuous consumption. They instead follow a pragmatic tradition of reinvesting substantial surpluses of their business profits into commercial business expansion and the acquisition of cash flow producing and income-generating assets. A sizable percentage of the conglomerates managed by capable Filipino entrepreneurs and investors of Chinese ancestry—armed with the necessary managerial capabilities, enterprising disposition, commercial expertise, entrepreneurial acumen, investment savvy, and foresight—were able to grow from small budding enterprises into large corporate giants with widespread economic influence across the Philippines, Southeast Asia, and the global financial markets. Such massive corporate expansions engendered the term "Chinoy", which is colloquially used in Filipino newspapers to denote Filipino individuals with a degree of Chinese ancestry who either speak a Chinese dialect or adhere to Chinese customs.

As Chinese economic might grew, much of the indigenous Filipino majority were gradually driven out and displaced into poorer land on the hills, on the outskirts of major Filipino cities, or into the mountains. Disenchantment grew among the displaced indigenous Filipinos who felt they were unable compete with Chinese-owned businesses. Underlying resentment and bitterness from the impoverished Filipino majority has been accumulating as there has been no existence of indigenous Filipino having any substantial business equity in the Philippines. Decades of free market liberalization brought virtually no economic benefit to the indigenous Filipino majority but rather the opposite resulting a subjugated indigenous Filipino majority underclass, where the vast proportion of indigenous Filipinos still engage in rural peasantry, menial labor or domestic service and squatting. The Filipino government has dealt with this wealth disparity by establishing socialist and communist dictatorships or authoritarian regimes while pursuing a systematic and ruthless affirmative action campaigns giving privileges to allow the indigenous Filipino majority to gain a more equitable economic footing during the 1950s and 1960s. The rise of economic nationalism among the impoverished indigenous Filipino majority prompted by the Filipino government resulted in the passing of the Retail Trade Nationalization Law of 1954, where ethnic Chinese were barred and pressured to move out of the retail sector restricting engagement to Filipino citizens only. In addition, the Chinese were prevented from owning land by restricting land ownership to Filipinos only. Other restrictions on Chinese economic activities included limiting Chinese involvement in the import-export trade while trying to increase the indigenous Filipino involvement to gain a proportionate presence. In 1960, the Rice and Corn Nationalization Law was passed restricting trading, milling, and warehousing of rice and corn only to Filipinos while barring Chinese involvement, in which they initially had a significant presence. These policies ultimately backfired on the government as the laws had an overall negative impact on the government tax revenue which dropped significantly because the country's biggest source of taxpayers were Chinese, who eventually took their capital out of the country to invest elsewhere. The increased economic power held in the hands of the Chinese has triggered bitterness, suspicion, resentment, envy, insecurity, grievance, instability, ethnic hatred, and outright anti-Chinese hostility among the indigenous native Filipino majority towards the Chinese minority. Such hostility has resulted in the kidnapping of hundreds of Chinese Filipinos by indigenous Filipinos since the 1990s. Many victims, often children, are murdered, even after a ransom is paid. Numerous incidents of crimes such as kidnap-for-ransom, extortion, and other forms of harassment were committed against the Chinese Filipino community starting from the early 1990s continues to the present day. Thousands of displaced Filipino hill tribes and aborigines continue to live in satellite shantytowns on the outskirts of Manila in economic destitution where two-thirds of the country's indigenous Filipinos live on less than 2 dollars per day in extreme poverty. Such animosity, antagonism, bitterness, envy, grievance, insecurity, and resentment can be readily triggered among segments of the indigenous Filipino population, as Chinese Filipinos have at times been targeted through incidents of kidnapping, vandalism, violence, and even murder. Anti-Chinese sentiment among the indigenous Filipino majority is deeply rooted in poverty but also feelings of resentment and exploitation are also exhibited among native and mestizo Filipinos blaming their socioeconomic failures on the Chinese.

== Future trends ==
Most of the younger generations of pure Chinese Filipinos are descendants of Chinese who migrated during the 1800s onward – this group retains much of Chinese culture, customs, and work ethic (though not necessarily language), whereas almost all Chinese mestizos are descendants of Chinese who migrated even before the Spanish colonial period and have been integrated and assimilated into the general Philippine society as a whole.

There are four trends that the Chinese Filipino would probably undertake within a generation or so:

- assimilation and integration, as in the case of Chinese Thais who eventually lost their genuine Chinese heritage and adopted Thai culture and language as their own
- separation, where the Chinese Filipino community can be clearly distinguished from the other ethnic groups in the Philippines; reminiscent of most Chinese Malaysians
- returning to ancestral land, which is the current phenomenon of overseas Chinese returning to China
- emigration to North America and Australasia, as in the case of some Chinese Malaysians and many Chinese Vietnamese (Hoa people)

During the 1970s, Fr. Charles McCarthy, an expert in Philippine-Chinese relations, observed that "the peculiarly Chinese content of the Philippine-Chinese subculture is further diluted in succeeding generations" and he made a prediction that "the time will probably come and it may not be far off, when, in this sense, there will no more 'Chinese' in the Philippines". This view is still controversial however, with the constant adoption of new cultures by Filipinos contradicting this thought.

=== Integration and assimilation ===
Assimilation is defined as the adoption of the cultural norms of the dominant or host culture, while integration is defined as the adoption of the cultural norms of the dominant or host culture while maintaining their culture of origin.

As of the present day, due to the effects of globalization in the Philippines, there has been a marked tendency to assimilate to Filipino lifestyles influenced by the US, among ethnic Chinese. This is especially true for younger Chinese Filipino living in Metro Manila who are gradually shifting to English as their preferred language, thus identifying more with Western culture, at the same time speaking Chinese among themselves. Similarly, as the cultural divide between Chinese Filipino and other Filipinos erode, there is a steady increase of intermarriages with native and mestizo Filipinos, with their children completely identifying with the Filipino culture and way of life. Assimilation is gradually taking place in the Philippines, albeit at a slower rate as compared to Thailand.

On the other hand, the largest Chinese Filipino organization, the Kaisa Para Sa Kaunlaran openly espouses eventual integration but not assimilation of the Chinese Filipino with the rest of Philippine society and clamors for maintaining Chinese language education and traditions.

Meanwhile, the general Philippine public is largely neutral regarding the role of the Chinese Filipino in the Philippines, and many have embraced Chinese Filipino as fellow Filipino citizens and even encouraged them to assimilate and participate in the Philippines' future.

=== Separation ===
Separation is defined as the rejection of the dominant or host culture in favor of preserving their culture of origin, often characterized by the presence of ethnic enclaves.

The recent rapid economic growth of both China and Taiwan as well as the successful business acumen of Overseas Chinese have fueled among many Chinese Filipino a sense of pride through immersion and regaining interest in Chinese culture, customs, values and language while remaining in the Philippines.

Despite the community's inherent ethnocentrism – there are no active proponents for political separation, such as autonomy or even independence, from the Philippines, partly due to the small size of the community relative to the general Philippine population, and the scattered distribution of the community throughout the archipelago, with only half residing in Metro Manila.

=== Returning to the ancestral land ===
Many Chinese Filipino entrepreneurs and professionals have flocked to their ancestral homeland to partake of business and employment opportunities opened up by China's emergence as a global economic superpower.

As above, the fast economic growth of China and the increasing popularity of Chinese culture has also helped fan pro-China patriotism among a majority of Chinese Filipino who espouse 愛國愛鄉 (ài guó ài xiāng) sentiments (love of ancestral country and hometown). Some Chinese Filipino, especially those belonging to the older generation, still demonstrate ài guó ài xiāng by donating money to fund clan halls, school buildings, Buddhist temples and parks in their hometowns in China.

=== Emigration to North America and Australasia ===
During the 1990s to the early 2000s, Philippine economic difficulties and more liberal immigration policies in destination countries have led to well-to-do Chinese Filipino families to acquire North American or Australasian passports and send their children abroad to attend prestigious North America or Australasian universities. Many of these children are opting to remain after graduation to start professional careers in North America or Australasia, like their Chinese brethren from other parts of Asia.

Many Philippine-educated Chinese Filipino from middle-class families are also migrating to North America and Australasia for economic advantages. Those who have family businesses regularly commute between North America (or Australasia) and the Philippines. In this way, they follow the well-known pattern of other Chinese immigrants to North America who lead "astronaut" lifestyles: family in North America, business in Asia.

== See also ==
- China–Philippines relations
- Chinese Filipinos who migrated to Mexico during the galleon trade
- CHInoyTV, a TV program featuring the Chinese community in the Philippines
- Filipinos in China
- List of Chinese schools in the Philippines
- Manila Chinese Cemetery
- Sangley
- Hispanized Filipino-Chinese surnames
