= Mandarin Chinese in the Philippines =

Philippine varieties of the Mandarin language

- 菲律賓華語 / 菲律宾华语; Fēilǜbīn Huáyǔ ㄈㄟ ㄌㄩˋ ㄅㄧㄣ ㄏㄨㄚˊ ㄩˇ
- Region: Philippines
- Ethnicity: Chinese Filipinos
- Native speakers: 2,317,000 (Note: This figure includes both L1 and L2 speakers.)
- Language family: Sino-Tibetan: Sinitic; Mandarin; Beijing Mandarin; Standard Chinese; Mandarin Chinese in the Philippines
- Writing system: Chinese characters (Simplified, Traditional); Latin (Pinyin); Zhuyin Fuhao

Official status
- Official language in: None
- Regulated by: Philippine Chinese Education Research Center (PCERC), Department of Education (DepEd)

Language codes
- ISO 639-3: –
- Glottolog: None
- Linguasphere: 79-AAA-bbd-(part)(=colloquial)
- IETF: cmn-PH

Mandarin Chinese (Note: simplified Chinese: 华语; traditional Chinese: 華語; pinyin: Huáyǔ; Wade–Giles: Hua^{²}-yü^{³}; Zhuyin Fuhao: ㄏㄨㄚˊ ㄩˇ) (Note: commonly known as just "Chinese" (referring to Standard Chinese) in the Philippines) is the primary formal Chinese language taught academically to students in Chinese Filipino private schools (historically established by and meant for Chinese Filipinos) and additionally across other private and public schools, universities, and institutions in the Philippines, especially as the formal written Chinese language.

Both Standard Chinese (PRC) and Taiwanese Mandarin (ROC) are taught and spoken in the Philippines depending on the school, with some schools using simplified Chinese characters, some using traditional Chinese characters, and some using a mixture of both. Meanwhile, Chinese-language publications have traditionally used traditional Chinese characters. In modern times, it is usually predominantly written horizontally left-to-right (or traditionally right-to-left), but some schools, such as Chiang Kai Shek College, etc., and newspapers, such as United Daily News, sometimes traditionally write it vertically as well. Mandarin in the Philippines is typically known in Mandarin simplified Chinese: 华语; traditional Chinese: 華語; pinyin: Huáyǔ; Zhuyin Fuhao: ㄏㄨㄚˊ ㄩˇ and typically in Philippine Hokkien Chinese: 國語; Pe̍h-ōe-jī: kok-gí.

Mandarin Chinese is formally used in print publications in Chinese-language newspapers and books in the Philippines, such as World News, United Daily News, Chinese Commercial News, and many others.

Mandarin Chinese in the Philippines
- Traditional Chinese: 菲律賓華語
- Simplified Chinese: 菲律宾华语
- Literal meaning: Philippine Chinese Language
Transcriptions
Standard Mandarin
- Hanyu Pinyin: Fēilǜbīn Huáyǔ
- Wade–Giles: Fei¹lü⁴pin¹ Hua²yü³
- Yale Romanization: Fēilyùbīn Hwáyǔ
- IPA: [féɪlŷpín xwǎỳ]
Yue: Cantonese
- Jyutping: fei2 leot6 ban1 waa4 jyu5
Southern Min
- Hokkien POJ: Hui-li̍p-pin Huâ-gí

Alternative Chinese name
- Traditional Chinese: 菲律濱華語
- Simplified Chinese: 菲律滨华语
Transcriptions
Standard Mandarin
- Hanyu Pinyin: Fēilǜbīn Huáyǔ
Yue: Cantonese
- Jyutping: fei2 leot6 ban1 waa4 jyu5
Southern Min
- Hokkien POJ: Hui-li̍p-pin Huâ-gí

== Classification ==
Mandarin in the Philippines can be classified into two distinct Mandarin dialects: Standard Mandarin and Colloquial Mandarin. Standard Mandarin is either the standard language of mainland China or Taiwan, while Colloquial Mandarin in the Philippines tends to combine features from Mandarin (simplified Chinese: 华语; traditional Chinese: 華語) and features from Hokkien (閩南語) of the local Philippine Hokkien dialect, which is the heritage language of many Chinese Filipinos.

== Usage ==
Only a small minority of Chinese Filipinos claim Mandarin as their native first language, with Filipino (Tagalog) or English or Philippine Hokkien typically being the first language. The lack of environment for speaking the language and the difficulty of learning it created not just a lack of interest, but even great disgust by some towards it.

Efforts in the 21st century to promote Mandarin Chinese education in Chinese Filipino institutions and recent utilitarian trends, such as more Mandarin job opportunities, recent immigrants from China or Taiwan, summer education trips to China or Taiwan, encouragement of universities and schools by past presidents, and education exchange deals with China have spurred interest and potential for growth in the usage of Mandarin.

=== Code-switching ===
Sometimes Chinese Filipinos also code-switch Mandarin together with other languages, such as English, Tagalog (or other Philippine languages), and Hokkien, as a form of pidgin language, just like Hokaglish or Singlish.

== Education ==
There are about 150 or so Chinese schools that exist throughout the Philippines, around a third of which operate in Metro Manila. Most education of Standard Chinese (Mandarin) provided in the Philippines is facilitated through Chinese Filipino schools established by Chinese Filipinos, which typically include the teaching of Standard Chinese (Mandarin) in one or multiple Chinese class subjects depending on the school, along with other school class subjects taught in English or Filipino (Tagalog) depending on the class subject.

=== History ===
The earliest evident record of Mandarin Chinese in the Philippines, excluding the earliest Classical Chinese texts printed in the Philippines by the Spanish friars, are from manuscripts made by the Spanish friars studying Chinese during the 1600s-1700s, such as the Dictionario Hispanico Sinicum (1626-1642), which primarily studied Hokkien Chinese in the Philippines but also additionally started to add romanized Mandarin Chinese sourced from their Sangley Chinese informants, whether in early Spanish Philippines or from late Ming China, which back then centuries ago, the Spaniards had not fully understood yet the differences between the Chinese language family.

Historically, the first and oldest Chinese school in the Philippines, the Anglo-Chinese School「小呂宋華僑中西學堂」(modern-day Tiong Se Academy), was founded on April 15, 1899 by Engracio Palanca Tan Kang, the son of Carlos Palanca Tan Quien Sien, the Gobernadorcillo de los Sangleyes or Capitan chino of Binondo (Manila Chinatown) and the first acting consul general of Qing China to the Philippines, just after the end of the Spanish colonial era and the early months of the Philippine-American War during the start of the American colonial era. It first held classes at the backyard of the Imperial Chinese Consulate-General, with only about twenty students when it first opened. Its initial curriculum was the study of the Chinese classics, letter writing (尺牘) in Chinese characters, and how to use the Chinese abacus (珠算) with the language of instruction initially mainly monolingually in Hokkien, sometimes with some English, mainly studying the reading and writing of Classical Chinese (漢文, Hokkien Pe̍h-ōe-jī: Hàn-bûn) and Chinese mathematics (算術, Pe̍h-ōe-jī: Soàn-su̍t; 數學, Pe̍h-ōe-jī: Sò͘-ha̍k) with books and teachers mainly imported from Southern Fujian, closely serving the needs of the local Hokkien-speaking Chinese community of the Philippines. It served to increase literacy in a time of widespread illiteracy for practical purposes such as to be able to read Chinese characters via reading the Chinese classics for higher learning, write in Chinese characters to be able to write letters to mail to family, friends, or business purposes, and do mathematics with the abacus for business purposes, such as accounting and finance.

The gradual shift to the modern curriculum of teaching Mandarin in the Philippines came mainly around the founding of the Republic of China (ROC) around 1912 after the 1911 Xinhai Revolution ended the Qing dynasty in China. During the early 20th century in 1902, Imperial Japan had initiated a standardized form of the Japanese language, known in Japanese: 國語(こくご), romanized: kokugo, lit. 'national language', which inspired reformers of the Qing bureaucracy in China, enough that in 1909, the Qing education ministry officially proclaimed the Nanking-based late imperial Mandarin too in Mandarin Chinese: 國語; Wade–Giles: kuo^{²}-yü^{³}; lit. 'national language', which its status continued even after the fall of the Qing dynasty, only decades later gradually switching to the modern Beijing-based Mandarin. During the early 20th century American colonial era in the Philippines, newly founded Chinese schools gradually adopted the modern curriculum from China, which included Chinese language, history, geography, math, and sciences, which the language of instruction shifted from monolingual Hokkien to bilingual Hokkien and Mandarin instruction, where initially the Hokkien-speaking Filipino-Chinese teacher would primarily read and explain Chinese texts in Hokkien, whilst simultaneously teaching how it is read in Mandarin for the average Hokkien-speaking Filipino-Chinese student back then, since Mandarin was the official "national language" of ROC, often translated as "Chinese language" from an outside-China perspective. Mandarin Chinese was known back then during the founding of ROC to even now in Philippine Hokkien Chinese: 國語; Pe̍h-ōe-jī: kok-gí; lit. 'national language', while in Mandarin Chinese: 華語; Zhuyin Fuhao: ㄏㄨㄚˊ ㄩˇ; lit. 'Chinese language', since formally there is a risk of confusion to which country a word that means 'national language' is in reference to. Chinese textbooks as used in Chinese schools in the Philippines during the early 20th century usually did not include any romanization, besides Chinese characters, but it was also the period when Zhuyin Fuhao / Bopomofo was first introduced and taught in Chinese schools in the Philippines, usually known in Philippine Hokkien Chinese: 國音; Pe̍h-ōe-jī: kok-im, after the system's first name in Mandarin Chinese: 國音字母; Wade–Giles: kuo^{²}-yin^{¹} tzŭ^{⁴}-mu^{³}; Zhuyin Fuhao: ㄍㄨㄛˊ ㄧㄣㄗˋ ㄇㄨˇ; lit. 'national pronunciation alphabet'. During the Second Sino-Japanese War in 1937, it also spurred more refugees and migrants from China to migrate to American-era Philippines, enough that many were educated folk from China that became the Chinese teachers in the new Chinese schools being founded.

During the early 20th century, some Chinese schools in the Philippines also initially added an English class to keep pace with the increasing formal usage of English, which Philippine society gradually adopted under and after the American colonial era. This led to the Chinese schools later adopting a dual curriculum, where there were two independent divisions known as the English Division and the Chinese Division, where each division was held in the morning or afternoon. The Chinese division was patterned after the curriculum standards of primary and secondary education established by the ROC government, while the English division followed the curriculum standards of the primary and secondary education required by the Department of Public Instruction (modern-day Department of Education (DepEd)) of American-era Philippines. The system had issues with duplicated subjects such as mathematics and science which were taught once in English and also another time in the Chinese curriculum. This dual curriculum system though made it so the education then produced trilingual then later quadrilingual students, as the Chinese division used both Hokkien and Mandarin, while the English division initially used English. By the Commonwealth era of the Philippines, Tagalog was proclaimed by Pres. Manuel Quezon on December 31, 1937 as the basis of the National Language (Tagalog: Wikang Pambansâ) of the Philippines. This made it so, the English division additionally added a Tagalog class as well, which during Japanese occupation in WW2, the teaching of Tagalog, Philippine history, and personal character education was given priority instead of English. The Chinese division typically included class subjects like math, science, history, geography, civics, ethics, etc., wherein Mandarin was mainly used in Chinese language class and Chinese literature class, where Chinese teachers mainly read Chinese texts and words in Mandarin and explained them in Hokkien. Class subjects though such as mathematics and sciences in the Chinese division were mainly taught in Hokkien. During this time, Chinese language, literature, and mathematics, were mainly taught via rote memorization, known in Philippine Hokkien Chinese: 死讀; Pe̍h-ōe-jī: sí-tha̍k, where teachers pointed to a picture of an object or animal, then recited the Mandarin vocabulary words together side-by-side their equivalent Hokkien words in Chinese language class, which students were expected to repeatedly recite and orally memorize (e.g. teacher points to a fly, students recite: 苍蝇; tsʻang^{¹}-ying^{²}; ㄘㄤ ㄧㄥˊ, 胡蠅; hô͘-sîn; teacher points to a mosquito, students recite: 蚊子; wên^{²}-tzŭ^{⁵}; ㄨㄣˊ ˙ㄗ; 蠓; báng), then for Chinese mathematics class, the multiplication tables were mainly memorized in Hokkien (e.g. "2 × 1 = 2, 2 × 2 = 4, 2 × 3 = 6" are read in Philippine Hokkien Chinese: 二 × 一 = 二，二 × 二 = 四，二 × 三 = 六; Pe̍h-ōe-jī: lī-it lī, lī-lī sì, lī-saⁿ la̍k).

After WW2 and de-jure Philippine independence from the United States in 1946, the newly independent Philippine government around the start of the Cold War era signed the Sino-Philippine Treaty of Amity in April 18, 1947 with the ROC government still based in mainland China, which explicitly stated that ROC citizens are allowed to establish schools in the Philippines to educate their children. This made it so Chinese schools in the Philippines from then on were officially under the purview of the Republic of China (ROC) and Chinese schools and teachers had to register with the ROC embassy in the Philippines back then for supervision of the Chinese departments of each school and for teachers to get a certificate to teach, while the other subject departments were registered and supervised by the Philippine government's Department of Education (DepEd). In 1949, the People's Republic of China (PRC) was proclaimed by the Chinese Communist Party (CCP) and the ROC government under the Kuomintang (KMT) and its remaining armed forces and refugees retreated to Taiwan as a result of the Chinese Civil War. The Philippine government continued to recognize the Republic of China in Taiwan and the 1947 treaty, which let the ROC Ministry of Education in Taiwan continue to supervise the Chinese department of Chinese schools in the Philippines and begin to provide Chinese textbooks coming from Taiwan. After the retreat of the ROC government under the KMT in 1949, the White Terror began upon Martial law in Taiwan for the KMT to solidify rule and quash dissidents after the end of Imperial Japanese rule over Taiwan. The martial law era of Taiwan saw the promotion of Mandarin with a monolingual Mandarin language policy as part of the KMT's consolidation of power in Taiwan via de-Japanization and promotion of national unity against its ideological rival in mainland China. The ROC government encouraged Mandarin as a national language that would serve as a lingua franca for all groups in Taiwan and heavily discouraged any other with harsh policies, for its ambition of national unity and patriotism through standardizing Mandarin as a means to prove that the newly established Republic of China in Taiwan is more superior and united than the People’s Republic of China. The ROC government in Taiwan intensified this campaign not just in Taiwan but also propagated this to overseas Chinese communities, such as to the Chinese departments of the Chinese schools in the Philippines. Around roughly the 1950s-1970s depending on the school, the Chinese departments of different Chinese schools in the Philippines were to teach Chinese language, history, geography, and mathematics exclusively only in Mandarin.

Likewise, after the founding of the People's Republic of China (PRC) across the late 20th century, it also made efforts in mainland China to promote Mandarin as Standard Chinese under the State Language Commission established in 1949 to facilitate easier communication throughout the country using Mandarin as a national lingua franca. In 1955, the PRC government of Mainland China also renamed the name of Mandarin in Mandarin simplified Chinese: 国语; traditional Chinese: 國語; pinyin: Guóyǔ; lit. 'national language' into Mandarin simplified Chinese: 普通话; traditional Chinese: 普通話; pinyin: Pǔtōnghuà; lit. 'common speech', although the former is still widely used in Taiwan. The concept of a dichotomy in Chinese characters with Simplified Chinese characters vs Traditional Chinese characters was introduced by the PRC through several rounds of mass standardization and simplification throughout the late 20th century, particularly 1956, 1964, 1977, 1988, 2013. The Hanyu Pinyin romanization system for Mandarin Standard Chinese was also first introduced and taught in 1958 in mainland China, then adopted in 1980 in Singapore, and in 2009 in Taiwan. Likewise in Singapore, there was also a Speak Mandarin Campaign from 1979 and beyond by the Promote Mandarin Council of the Singapore government to promote a united Chinese mother-tongue lingua franca for Singapore's Chinese Singaporean population. In Malaysia, Mandarin is also taught as the only Chinese language taught and regulated by the Chinese Language Standardisation Council of Malaysia under the Ministry of Education of Malaysia for the Chinese schools there for Chinese Malaysians. Likewise, other Chinese schools throughout Southeast Asia also followed suit in teaching Mandarin as the Chinese class, such as in Indonesia for Chinese Indonesians. In Singapore, Malaysia, Indonesia and likewise in the Philippines as well, Chinese schools prefer to call Mandarin Standard Chinese in Mandarin simplified Chinese: 华语; traditional Chinese: 華語; pinyin: Huáyǔ; Zhuyin Fuhao: ㄏㄨㄚˊ ㄩˇ; lit. 'Chinese language' due to the risk of confusion to which country or community a word that means 'national language' (國語) or 'common speech' (普通话) is in reference to.

In 1972, Pres. Ferdinand Marcos Sr. declared Martial law in the Philippines and later promulgated the 1973 constitution, which banned the ownership and operation of alien schools, which were to be phased out in 4 years. The Chinese schools in the Philippines were to be nationalized and became legally Philippine private schools. From a maximum of 160 minutes per day in grade one and two of elementary school and max of 200 minutes per day in high school were all to be reduced to only a maximum of 120 minutes per day only for the teaching of Chinese language class. The names of the schools were also to remove the word "Chinese", which some schools decided to change their school names with Hokkien transcriptions or reworded them to keep their school acronyms by changing the word "Chinese" in their name to another word that started with the letter "C", such as "Cultural", "Central", "Chung Hua", "Chong Hua", "Community", "Christian", "Catholic", "City", "Citizen", "Confucius", "Chamber", etc. There was also a maximum ratio of alien students to be only at one-third, which Chinese schools were able to easily meet by 1974, since the naturalization process was liberalized which caused a mass naturalization of Filipino Chinese (then only with permanent residency and usually ROC, British Hong Kong, Portuguese Macau, and some PRC citizenship), converting many into Chinese Filipinos (with Philippine citizenship) in 1974. There were also some Chinese schools and especially the ROC embassy that resisted the nationalization, citing their service in education, provision of local employment, their high English education standards, and the 1947 Sino-Philippine Treaty of Amity, which increasingly became no longer applicable as the Chinese school owners now mostly received Philippine citizenship after the mass naturalization of 1974. The Chinese schools were nationalized due to previous debates on the direction and focus of education of Chinese schools due to the strong focus on China in the Chinese curriculum, which the older generations tended to be fine with, but the younger generation students during the late 20th century who were typically born and raised in the Philippines increasingly saw little relevance of the Chinese subject matters to their daily lives in the Philippines and had very little idea of the Chinese society in either mainland China or Taiwan. Students and even the Chinese schools themselves saw they had no hand in the designing of the Chinese curriculum controlled by the ROC government, enough that some Chinese schools in the Philippines during the mid-1960s already decided to break away from the system of ROC supervision, such as some Jesuit-run Chinese schools like Xavier school among others, which applied beforehand to be classified as Philippine schools instead of Chinese schools to not be accredited under the ROC system, primarily because they were tired of the redundant Cold War-fueled internecine KMT vs communist political antagonisms that mattered little in the Philippine setting. This policy of nationalizing Chinese schools gave way to in-house Philippine Chinese textbooks teaching Mandarin being made locally in the Philippines to orient to the Philippine setting and the elimination of textbooks imposed from Taiwan that contained KMT political propaganda.

In 1975, the Philippine government officially recognized and opened diplomatic relations with the People's Republic of China (PRC), especially after the Republic of China (ROC) lost its seat in 1971 as "China" in the United Nations. The seat of the Chinese embassy in the Philippines was transferred to the hands of the PRC, while the Republic of China (ROC) based in Taiwan instead opened the Taipei Economic and Cultural Office in the Philippines as its de facto embassy instead.

Due to the limit of 120 minutes per day introduced by the nationalization, different schools divided up their curriculums in various ways, some had two 1-hour Chinese classes per day, some had three 40-minute Chinese classes, with some dedicating it all to only Chinese language, or some having half the daily Chinese classes as Chinese composition (綜合, Pe̍h-ōe-jī: Chong-ha̍p) which was a combination of Chinese history, geography, and culture. Some also still had Chinese mathematics (數學, Pe̍h-ōe-jī: Sò͘-ha̍k) and some had Chinese calligraphy (毛筆, Pe̍h-ōe-jī: Mô͘-pit), which the Chinese curriculums tended to vary per school, which the weekly schedule per class section were also variously portioned throughout the school year depending on the school's curriculum per semester or quarter. Sometimes, the allotted time limit was informally exceeded as well, but this typically took up the time of the next class which was not necessarily a Chinese class anymore. In some cases, there were still a few that maintained the dual curriculum set up where afternoons were devoted entirely for Chinese classes, though not as lengthily anymore compared to pre-nationalization years.

Besides the in-house Philippine Chinese textbooks, the sets of textbooks used tended to vary over the years as well depending on different schools, which there are at least 4 or more sets of textbooks used by different Chinese schools in the Philippines, two of whom were prepared by the Taipei Economic and Cultural Office, which is the de facto Taiwan embassy, then another was prepared by Philippine Cultural College (PCC), and another was also prepared by Xavier school for the Jesuit-run Catholic Chinese schools, then possibly more sets of textbooks over the years as well in various other schools. For decades as well since the late 20th century to the 21st century, most Chinese schools did not change much in their methods of teaching Mandarin, while Philippine society increasingly became primarily more English and Tagalog speaking. Chinese Filipino schools still often use the first language approach, which assumes that students of Chinese Filipino schools have had native experience of Mandarin, despite the contrary. There has been a deterioration and stagnation in the Mandarin Chinese education in Chinese schools in the Philippines over the years, due to the lack of environment for speaking the language outside school and the difficulty of learning it as Chinese teachers themselves are low in supply in the Philippines and typically have no degree in education to teach Chinese, which creates not just a lack of interest, but even great disgust by some towards it, especially since the Chinese education system in the Philippines usually produces graduates too lacking in Mandarin for effective interactions with Mandarin speakers abroad. The solution pursued by some families was to send their kids to study Mandarin abroad, but in the 1980s-1990s, only very few negligible number usually go out their way to have their kids continue their Chinese education abroad likely due to the impractical high cost for each family. For the Chinese schools themselves, there were attempts to revise the Chinese textbooks, which just ended up with more sets of non-uniform textbooks across different schools, then there were efforts as well for teachers' training but it itself had an underlying shortage in supply of Mandarin teachers to fuel it. The immediate solution mainly pursued to mitigate the problem in past decades of the late 20th to 21st century was to import teachers from abroad initially from Taiwan, then also mainland China as of 2003. It proved only to be a band aid solution as the problem encountered there though during the 1990s-2000s was that the foreign Chinese teachers usually could not communicate well, due to their own lack of English and Tagalog fluency, and usually fail to understand the local culture and behavior of Chinese Filipino students to properly teach and appropriately grade them. Across the 21st century, there have been more students going abroad to study Mandarin, but the terms of study they enroll in are still only short and limited only to gain a bit more fluency to be able to learn enough to do business with Mandarin speakers, but they usually do not come back as well planning to teach.

In 1991, some wealthy Chinese Filipinos donated funds to set up the Philippine Chinese Education Research Center (PCERC) in order to address the deterioration of the Philippine Chinese education system, via education method reform, training teachers, and developing suitable teaching materials. It tried to push for the teaching of Mandarin Chinese as a second language, rather than the first language approach, and encouraged the use and teaching of the Pinyin romanization system rather than the traditional Zhuyin fuhao phonetic system.

In terms of phonology, vocabulary and grammar, the "Chinese" (Mandarin) taught during most of the 20th century in the Philippines in many older Chinese Filipino schools often varied and is somewhat reminiscent sometimes of Taiwanese Mandarin, but ever since the late 20th to 21st century, different Chinese Filipino schools now also teach Beijing-based Mandarin Standard Chinese as well. As a result of the history, older Chinese schools in the Philippines still typically teach traditional Chinese characters and the Zhuyin phonetic system or some used to teach it but now shifted to simplified Chinese characters or teaching both depending on the school. In recent decades around the late 20th century to early 2000s depending on the school, many schools started to shift to using simplified Chinese characters and the Pinyin phonetic system instead ever since the Philippine government recognition of the PRC and the introduction of books and teaching materials from mainland China and sometimes Singapore started to be used and taught. In the 21st century, many Chinese Filipino schools now currently teach Chinese (Mandarin) in simplified characters with the Pinyin system, modeled after those in China and Singapore, though some older schools still teach both or either of the systems, where a few still remain teaching solely in traditional Chinese characters and the Zhuyin phonetic system or teach a mixture of simplified and traditional characters with pinyin. Chinese (Mandarin) newspapers in the Philippines, such as World News, United Daily News, Chinese Commercial News, and many others still mostly use traditional Chinese characters in writing. Due to the selection by the founders and sponsors of different Chinese schools, many schools now either teach using simplified Chinese characters only, traditional Chinese characters only, or a mixture of both. Many Chinese Filipino schools either use pinyin and/or bopomofo (zhuyin fuhao) to teach the language.

== See also ==
- Philippine Hokkien
- Languages of the Philippines
- List of Chinese schools in the Philippines
