= Philippine Hokkien =

Dialect of Hokkien spoken in the Philippines

- 咱人話 / 咱儂話; Lán-lâng-uē / Lán-nâng-uē / Nán-nâng-uē (Tâi-lô); Lán-lâng-ōe / Lán-nâng-ōe / Nán-nâng-ōe (POJ)
- Native to: Philippines
- Region: Metro Manila, Metro Cebu, Metro Davao, Zamboanga City, Cagayan de Oro, Metro Bacolod, Iloilo, Jolo, Tacloban, Angeles City, Vigan, Naga, Iligan, Ilagan, Baguio, Bohol, Laoag, Laguna, Rizal, Lucena, Cotabato, and many other parts of the Philippines
- Language family: Sino-Tibetan: Sinitic; Chinese; Min; Coastal Min; Southern Min; Hokkien; Quanzhou; Philippine Hokkien
- Early forms: Proto-Sino-Tibetan: Old Chinese (Note: Min is believed to have split from Old Chinese, rather than Middle Chinese like other varieties of Chinese.); Proto-Min
- Writing system: Chinese characters (traditional); Latin script; Ad hoc methods, Sporadic use of varying borrowed orthographies from local or former lingua francas, such as: English (Note: Co-official language of the Philippines); Filipino (Note: National and co-official language of the Philippines); Mandarin (Note: Philippine Mandarin as taught in Chinese Filipino schools); Spanish (Note: Historical official language of the Philippines since the Spanish colonial era, currently "promoted on a voluntary and optional basis" per the 1987 Constitution); Pe̍h-ōe-jī (sporadic); Tâi-lô (sporadic)

Official status
- Recognised minority language in: Philippines

Language codes
- ISO 639-3: nan for Southern Min / Min Nan which encompasses a variety of Hokkien dialects including "Lannang" / "Lán-lâng-ōe" / "咱人話" / "Philippine Hokkien".
- Glottolog: None
- Linguasphere: 79-AAA-jek
- IETF: nan-PH

Philippine Hokkien (Note: also known as Lannang-Oe (Chinese: 咱人話 / 咱儂話; Pe̍h-ōe-jī: Lán-nâng-ōe / Lán-lâng-ōe / Nán-nâng-ōe; lit. 'Our People's Speech'), Fukien, and Fookien) is a dialect of the Hokkien language of the Southern Min branch of Min Chinese descended directly from Old Chinese of the Sinitic family, primarily spoken vernacularly by Chinese Filipinos in the Philippines, where it serves as the local Chinese lingua franca within the overseas Chinese community in the Philippines and acts as the heritage language of a majority of Chinese Filipinos. Despite currently acting mostly as an oral language, Hokkien as spoken in the Philippines did indeed historically have a written language and is actually one of the earliest sources for written Hokkien using both Chinese characters (traditionally via Classical Chinese (漢文; Hàn-bûn) worded from and read in Hokkien) as early as around 1587 or 1593 through the Doctrina Christiana en letra y lengua china and using the Latin script as early as the 1590s in the Boxer Codex and was actually the earliest to systematically romanize the Hokkien language throughout the 1600s in the Hokkien-Spanish works of the Spanish friars especially by the Dominican Order, such as in the Dictionario Hispánico-Sinicum (1626-1642) and the Arte de la Lengua Chiõ Chiu (1620) among others. The use of Hokkien in the Philippines was historically influenced by Philippine Spanish, Filipino (Tagalog) and Philippine English. As a lingua franca of the overseas Chinese community in the Philippines, the minority of Chinese Filipinos of Cantonese and Taishanese descent also uses Philippine Hokkien for business purposes due to its status as "the Chinoy business language" [sic]. It is also used as a liturgical language as one of the languages that Protestant Chinese Filipino churches typically minister in with their church service, which they sometimes also minister to students in Chinese Filipino schools that they also usually operate. It is also a liturgical language primarily used by Chinese Buddhist, Taoist, and Matsu veneration temples in the Philippines, especially in their sutra chanting services and temple sermons by monastics.

Philippine Hokkien
- Traditional Chinese: 咱人話 / 咱儂話
- Hokkien POJ: Lán-nâng-ōe / Lán-lâng-ōe / Nán-nâng-ōe
- Literal meaning: Our People's Speech
Transcriptions
Southern Min
- Hokkien POJ: Lán-nâng-ōe / Lán-lâng-ōe / Nán-nâng-ōe
- Tâi-lô: Lán-nâng-uē / Lán-lâng-uē / Nán-nâng-uē

Alternative Name (Philippine Hokkien)
- Traditional Chinese: 菲律賓福建話
- Hokkien POJ: Hui-li̍p-pin Hok-kiàn-ōe
- Literal meaning: Philippine Hokkien Speech
Transcriptions
Standard Mandarin
- Hanyu Pinyin: Fēilǜbīn Fújiànhuà
Southern Min
- Hokkien POJ: Hui-li̍p-pin Hok-kiàn-ōe
- Tâi-lô: Hui-li̍p-pin Hok-kiàn-uē

Alternative Name (Philippine Min Nan)
- Traditional Chinese: 菲律賓閩南話
- Hokkien POJ: Hui-li̍p-pin Bân-lâm-ōe
- Literal meaning: Philippine Southern Min Speech
Transcriptions
Standard Mandarin
- Hanyu Pinyin: Fēilǜbīn Mǐnnánhuà
Southern Min
- Hokkien POJ: Hui-li̍p-pin Bân-lâm-ōe
- Tâi-lô: Hui-li̍p-pin Bân-lâm-uē

== Terminology ==
The term Philippine Hokkien is used when differentiating the variety of Hokkien spoken in the Philippines from those spoken in China, Taiwan, Malaysia, Singapore, Indonesia, and other Southeast Asian countries.

Historically, it was also known in Philippine English, Filipino (Tagalog), and other Philippine languages as Fookien or Fukien or Fukienese across the country, derived from the Chinese postal romanization of the Nanjing court dialect Mandarin reading of Fujian province in China, such as in the old newspaper, The Fookien Times. It was historically and is still also called as just "Chinese" in English or "Intsik" and "Tsino" in Filipino (Tagalog), usually generalized to refer to Chinese languages in general, usually by those unfamiliar with the Hokkien language compared with other Chinese languages or to promote to such people. It was also historically and is still formally and conservatively known as "Amoy", usually by Protestant Chinese Filipino churches and schools who conduct "Amoy Worship Service" or "Chinese Worship Service" as part of their liturgy, despite the danger of confusing the Amoy dialect of Hokkien compared to the Hokkien language in general, although these protestant Chinese Filipino churches also do indeed occasionally use abstract liturgical terms from the Amoy dialect of Hokkien too from time to time and also typically use bibles and hymnal books from Xiamen (Amoy) typically written in the Amoy dialect of Hokkien.

The endonym used by speakers of the dialect itself or the Hokkien language in general though is typically, Chinese: 咱人話 / 咱儂話; Pe̍h-ōe-jī: Lán-nâng-ōe / Lán-lâng-ōe / Nán-nâng-ōe; Tâi-lô: Lán-nâng-uē / Lán-lâng-uē / Nán-nâng-uē.

== Sociolinguistics ==
Only 12.2% of all ethnic Chinese in the Philippines have a variety of Chinese as their mother tongue. Nevertheless, the vast majority (77%) still retain the ability to understand and speak Hokkien as a second or third language.

== History ==
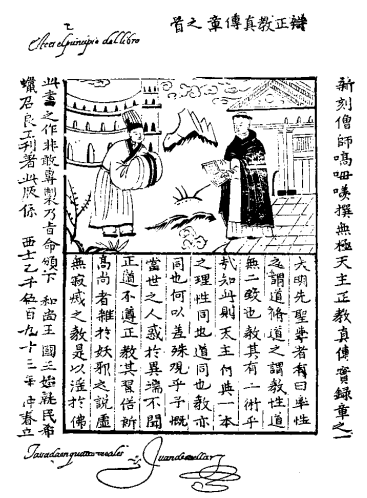
First page of Rectificación y Mejora de Principios Naturales (天主教真傳實錄), in Classical Chinese by Fr. Juan Cobo, published posthumously in 1593, Manila, with resemblance to the style of the Tagalog and Hokkien Doctrina Christiana published in the same year

From the late 16th century to the early 17th century, Spanish friars in the Philippines, such as the Dominican Order and Jesuits specifically in Manila, produced materials documenting the Hokkien varieties spoken by the Chinese trading community who had settled there in the late 16th century:

- Doctrina Christiana en letra y lengua China (1593), by Miguel de Benavides and Juan Cobo, a Hokkien version of the Doctrina Christiana.
- Rectificación y Mejora de Principios Naturales (1593), by Juan Cobo, a mostly Classical Chinese work written to transmit Roman Catholicism and western scientific knowledge to Hokkien Sangleyes.
- Espejo Rico del Claro Corazón—Beng Sim Po Cam (1590s), by Juan Cobo and Miguel de Benavides, a Hokkien book of proverbs and warnings from various texts for children's enlightenment and moral guidance.
- Dictionarium Sino Hispanicum (1604), by Pedro Chirino
- Vocabulary & Grammar Chin-Cheu (1600s)
- Vocabulario de la Lengua Española y China / Vocabulario Hispanico y Chinico
- Bocabulario de la lengua sangleya por las letraz de el A.B.C. (1617), a Spanish-Hokkien dictionary, with definitions.
- Arte de la Lengua Chiõ Chiu (1620), a Spanish-Hokkien grammar book.
- Dictionario Hispánico-Sinicum (1626-1642), a primarily Spanish-Hokkien dictionary (with additional incomplete Mandarin part), giving equivalent words, but not definitions.
- Vocabulario de letra china (1643), by Francisco Diaz

These texts appear to record a dialect descended primarily from a coastal Chiangchiu (Zhangzhou) dialect of Hokkien, specifically modern-day Haicheng (海澄; Hái-têng) from the area around the old port of Yuegang (an old initially illegal smuggling port that was later legalized in 1567 and is now part of Longhai), but also with some attested features of the dialects of Chuanchiu (Quanzhou), such as from Anhai (安海; Oaⁿ-hái) and Tong'an (同安; Tâng-oaⁿ), and Teo-Swa as well, hence Klöter (2011) considers it to be a contact variety, known as Early Manila Hokkien (EMH). Yuegang (月港; Goe̍h-káng), part of Zhangzhou Prefecture under the late Ming China and Qing China used to be the Chinese terminus to and from Spanish Manila, under the Spanish Empire, which was part of the main artery that linked the trans-Pacific trade carried by the Manila galleon over the Pacific to Acapulco in New Spain (modern-day Mexico) of the Spanish Americas, that was also linked to the trans-Atlantic trade from the port of Veracruz to Seville in Spain, spreading trade goods from Asia across the Americas and later across Iberia and Europe. Later, the old port of Yuegang (月港; Goe̍h-káng) would be overshadowed and supplanted by the Port of Xiamen (廈門港; Ē-mn̂g Káng) closer to the sea by around the mid-1600s at the Ming-Qing transition due to conflict between the Ming/Southern Ming loyalist, Koxinga (國姓爺; Kok-sèng-iâ), and the Qing forces.

As a result as well of a 1603 Sangley Rebellion and a 1639 2nd Sangley Rebellion which both caused massacres of ethnic Sangley Chinese in Manila or Southern Luzon in general, the loss of Spanish Formosa to the Dutch in 1642, and the victory of Koxinga (國姓爺; Kok-sèng-iâ) in 1662 against the Dutch at the Siege of Fort Zeelandia in Taiwan, which caused the founding of the Kingdom of Tungning, Koxinga would send an ultimatum to Spanish Manila demanding to pay tribute to him or else he would send a fleet to conquer them and expel the Spaniards as well. The Spanish took the threat very seriously and withdrew their forces from the Moluccas, Sulu, and Mindanao to strengthen Manila in preparation for an attack. There would be several raids across Northern Luzon by Koxinga's forces. In the same year of 1662, Koxinga would suddenly die of malaria, only a few months after defeating the Dutch, in a fit of madness and delirium after discovering that his son and heir, Zheng Jing, had an affair with his wet nurse and conceived a child with her. A 1662 Sangley Massacre would ensue due to these mounting events and many Sangley Chinese fled by ship or to the mountains. Likewise during the 1700s, Spanish Dominican friar missionaries in Amoy/Xiamen would be severely persecuted in the region as well, but nevertheless continued to operate clandestinely.

The Sangley Chinese community in the Philippines would survive through the 1700s but intermix locally to create Chinese Mestizos (Mestizos de Sangley) and be replenished by migrants from Amoy/Xiamen and Chinchew/Quanzhou. Some of whom even aided the British during the British occupation of Manila in 1762-1764. The Chinese Mestizo (Mestizos de Sangley) descendants throughout the centuries with each succeeding generation would gradually stop speaking Hokkien though in favor of assimilating to the local mainstream languages of their time, especially Tagalog and Spanish, such as in the mestizo family of Philippine national hero, Jose Rizal. The Hokkien spoken across the Philippines throughout the past centuries introduced certain amounts of Hokkien loanwords to Philippine Spanish and the major lowland Austronesian languages of the Philippines, such as Tagalog, Kapampangan, Cebuano Bisaya, Hiligaynon, Central Bicolano, Pangasinense, Ilocano, Waray-waray, Chavacano, etc. as a result of the generations of intermarriage and assimilation. Those who chose to marry endogamously and retained speaking the language and as a result of gradual replenishment of migrants from Amoy/Xiamen and Chinchew/Quanzhou, especially relatives from Fujian, China of those already in the Philippines, throughout the centuries would later continue the Sangley Chinese community in the Philippines that spoke Hokkien.

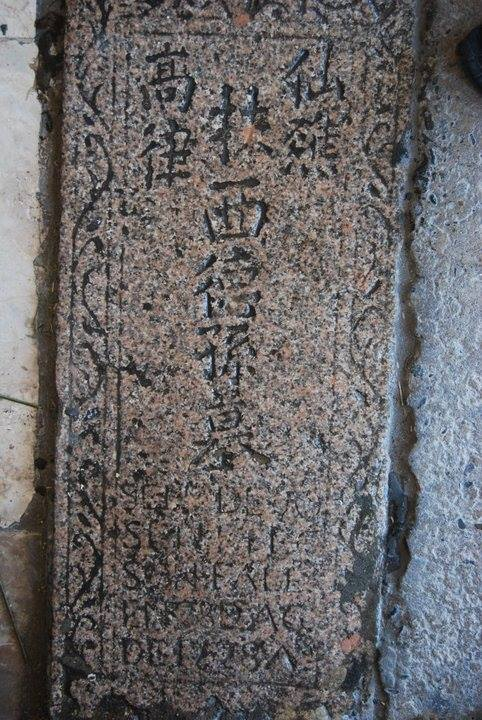
扶西德孫墓 (Hokkien POJ: Hû-se Tek-sun Bō͘, lit. "Jose Tecson's Grave"; 仙礁 (POJ: Sian-ta) 高律 (POJ: Ko-lu̍t), lit. "Santa Cruz" d. 1728 AD), located in San Andres Apostol Church of Candaba, Pampanga (as of 2010)

Later in the early 1800s, the Spanish Empire would also have its issues with conflicts and wars that would seriously destabilize it, starting with the Napoleonic Wars in Europe, and the numerous conflicts and wars of independence across the Spanish Americas, which eliminated the Spanish Americas as the center of the Spanish Empire.

Around 1815, the Manila–Acapulco galleon trade would finally cease when the Mexican War of Independence broke out, which the First Mexican Empire would gain independence from the Spanish Empire by 1821. From then on 1821 to 1898, Spanish Philippines would be under direct royal governance under Madrid in Spain.

By 1832, Rev. Walter Henry Medhurst still noted in his Hokkien dictionary, originally as an account given by Conrad Malte-Brun (1775-1826) on the province of Hok-këèn (Fujian), that

Tchang-chew-fou (Chëang-chew-hoó) [sic] is near the port of Emouy (Āy-moôiⁿᵍ) [sic], a great emporium of trāde, frequented by the Spaniards from Manilla [sic].

— Conrad Malte-Brun, as quoted by Walter Henry Medhurst, A Dictionary of the Hok-këèn Dialect of the Chinese Language, According to the Reading and Colloquial Idioms: Containing About 12,000 Characters, A Short Historical and Statistical Account of the Province of Hok-këèn. (Compiled from European and Chinese Authors.)

The Spanish trade with Amoy to and from Manila later grew nominal as a result of the above destabilizing conflicts cutting the empire in half. The Hokkien Chinese merchants from Amoy and Chinchew to and from Manila would later outcompete the Spaniards by the mid-1800s, as noted by the British, such as James Matheson, co-founder of Jardine Matheson:

Amoy, a much more substantial port giving access to the tea-growing province of Fukien, was open to Spanish trade only. But the right was merely nominal because Chinese junks could transport goods to and from the Philippines much more cheaply than could the Spaniards. The latter had practically given up the trade; only one Spanish ship put in at Amoy between 1810 and 1830. ...Another witness said the Spaniards had given up the Amoy trade since 1800.

— Michael Greenberg, British Trade and the Opening of China, 1800-1842, Chapter III: The Canton Commercial System, p.47

The Suez Canal which would later link Spanish Philippines directly to Spain in Iberia without rounding the cape would only start construction by 1859 and be completed at 1869.

By 1873, Rev. Carstairs Douglas writes in his Hokkien dictionary that

Singapore and the various Straits Settlements [such as Penang and Malacca], Batavia [Jakarta] and other parts of the Dutch possessions [Indonesia], are crowded with emigrants, especially from the Chang-chew prefecture; Manila and other parts of the Philippines have great numbers from Chin-chew, and emigrants are largely scattered in like manner in Siam [Thailand], Burmah [Myanmar], the Malay Peninsula [Peninsular Malaysia], Cochin China [Southern Vietnam], Saigon [Ho Chi Minh City, Vietnam], &c. In many of these places there is also a great mixture of emigrants from Swatow.

— Carstairs Douglas, Chinese–English Dictionary of the Vernacular or Spoken Language of Amoy, Extent of the Amoy Vernacular, and its Sub-division into Dialects: Colonization And Emigration

By 1883, Rev. John Macgowan also records 3 entries explicitly defining Hokkien Chinese: 呂宋; Pe̍h-ōe-jī: Lū-sòng; lit. 'Luzon' in his Hokkien dictionary:

Luzon, 呂宋 Lū-sòng,—belongs to Spain, 呂宋是大°呂宋之°屬國 Lū-sòng sī Tōa lū-sòng ê siók kok

— John Macgowan, English and Chinese Dictionary of the Amoy Dialect, L

Manilla [sic], 呂宋 Lū-sòng, very many Chinese go to—, 唐°人°去°呂宋盡多° tn̂g lâng khì Lū-sòng tsīn tsōe.

— John Macgowan, English and Chinese Dictionary of the Amoy Dialect, M

Philippines, 呂宋 Lū-sòng.

— John Macgowan, English and Chinese Dictionary of the Amoy Dialect, P

The Chinese community of the Philippines during the Spanish colonial era used to also speak a sort of Spanish pidgin variety known as "Caló Chino Español" or "La Lengua del Parian" in Spanish or "Kastilang tindahan" in Tagalog, especially because the Chinese community before obligates Chinese cabecillas (community leaders), such as Capitan Carlos Palanca Tan Quien Sien, to teach rudimentary Spanish to new Chinese immigrants which was taught in Chinese-owned schools. They could speak these Spanish pidgin varieties after one month which many, especially old timers later became very fluent, albeit some still with accented Spanish. Spanish was prevalent enough among the educated in the Philippines during the Spanish colonial era, that Joseph Earle Stevens, an American that stayed in Manila from 1893-1894 had this to say in his book, "Yesterdays in the Philippines":

Spanish, of course, is the court and commercial language and, except among uneducated natives who have a lingo of their own or among the few members of the Anglo-Saxon colony, it has a monopoly everywhere. No one can really get on without it, and even the Chinese come in with their peculiar pidgin variety

— Joseph Earle Stevens, Yesterdays in the Philippines

By 1941, Vicente Lim publishes a dictionary in Manila, titled "Chinese-English-Tagalog-Spanish Business conversation and social contact with Amoy pronunciation" giving equivalent words in the stated 4 languages, where "Chinese" and "Amoy" referred to a formalized literary form of the local Chuanchiu-based Hokkien as used by the author and the Chinese Filipino community in the Philippines at that time. As per Lim's dictionary, American English took precedence as consistent with the American colonial era, when English along with Spanish began to be taught as the official language of the Philippine Islands under the Insular Government, which later, Tagalog was chosen as the basis of Filipino, the national language of the Philippines under the 1935 constitution of the Philippine Commonwealth.

By 1987, under the current 1987 constitution of the Philippines, Spanish began to only be "promoted on a voluntary and optional basis", leading to most schools in the Philippines to no longer teach Spanish as a required class subject, which would most if not completely dissipate from mainstream use in later decades in the Philippines. The Spanish used decades before have been retained as a few Spanish loanwords in Philippine Hokkien, such as those found below.

In the 21st century, the Philippines now only has 2 official languages, Filipino (Tagalog) and English, with currently 19 recognized regional languages, including Cebuano Bisaya, Hiligaynon, etc., which Philippine Hokkien speakers currently frequently codeswitch with, which the form using Filipino (Tagalog) and English together with Hokkien is known as Hokaglish, akin to Taglish.

From the 20th to the 21st century, there have been a few books published about Hokkien from the Philippines based on what is used at least by the author in the Philippines and many of whom have been utilizing the Latin script often together with Chinese characters to try and write Hokkien based on the author's level of literacy on written Hokkien. Sometimes the Chinese characters used in these 20th to 21st century books only use Chinese characters more appropriate to Mandarin Standard Chinese, so it is mostly the Romanized Latin script section that can be properly identified as Philippine Hokkien, although due to different author's level of literacy on written Hokkien, the orthographies of the romanization used may widely differ per author usually influenced by the author's knowledge of English orthography, Filipino orthography, Mandarin Pinyin or Wade-Giles, and Spanish orthography (for older works). These 20th-21st century publications from the Philippines about Hokkien often also call the Hokkien language with different names, such as "Chinese", "Amoy", "Fookien", "Fukien", "Fukienese", or even "Fujianwa" or "Foojian". There have been books as well in the Philippines writing in Pe̍h-ōe-jī (POJ) for Hokkien in the Philippines, such as Victoria W. Peralta-Ang Gobonseng's "Amoy Vernacular Handbook" Vol. 1 Revised Edition (2003).

== Use as a liturgical language ==
Hokkien in the Philippines has been used as a liturgical language in Christianity (both Roman Catholicism and Protestant denominations), Chinese Buddhism, Taoism, and Matsu worship for centuries. For Roman Catholic Christianity, it was used ever since the Spanish friars ministered to Sangley Chinese around the 1590s to 1600s and beyond. For Buddhism, Taoism, and Matsu worship, it was used ever since the first Hokkien-speaking Sangley Chinese practitioners in the Philippines gathered together for liturgy or the first Buddhist, Taoist, and Ma-cho chinese temples were erected in the Philippines, such as the Seng Guan Temple, Ma-Cho Temple, etc. For Protestant Christianity, it was used ever since Protestant Chinese Filipinos converted to Protestant denominations around the early 20th century when the first Protestant Chinese Filipino churches sprang up, such as St. Stephen's Parish Church (for Episcopalian Anglicanism) and the United Evangelical Church of the Philippines (UECP) (for Presbyterian Evangelicalism), etc.

In the 21st century, Protestant Chinese Filipino churches and schools usually conduct liturgy usually called "Amoy Worship Service" or "Chinese Worship Service" where protestant Chinese Filipino pastors or reverends (Hokkien Chinese: 牧師; Pe̍h-ōe-jī: bo̍k-su) usually conduct their church service message in typically mostly Philippine Hokkien with added formal abstract liturgical Amoy Hokkien terms or Hokkienized Mandarin terms read in Philippine Hokkien reading and sometimes additionally Mandarin (i.e. some praise and worship songs in certain churches). These Chinese Filipino protestant churches are usually linked to BSOP (Biblical Seminary of the Philippines) and CCOWE (Chinese Congress on World Evangelization) and their respective Chinese Filipino schools that each Chinese Filipino church may also usually operate and sometimes also teach Hokkien usually known as "Amoy" or use it as language of instruction to teach Mandarin, which is also typically known as just "Chinese" in school classes. These Protestant Chinese Filipino churches that also operate with a Chinese Filipino school usually within the same campus also sometimes minister church or chapel service in "Amoy" (Hokkien) to their students too.

Chinese Buddhist temples in the Philippines also primarily conduct their sutra chanting services and temple sermons in Hokkien via the venerable monks and nuns living in the temples across the Philippines. Many of the Chinese Buddhist monastics only speak Hokkien or Mandarin (if recently came from China), though some can also speak English, and rarely also Filipino (Tagalog). Some of the Chinese Buddhist temples are associated as well with the Tzu Chi Foundation from Taiwan. Most Chinese Buddhist temples in the Philippines are rooted in the Chinese Mahāyāna tradition with some syncretizing Taoism, while also practicing Confucian principles. For example, Guandi or known in Hokkien as 帝爺公; Tè-iâ-kong or 關公; Koan-kong or 關帝爺; Koan-tè-iâ, the Chinese God of War, is usually a door god or a statue by the doors and entrances of Chinese Buddhist temples to serve as a symbolic protector. Some Chinese Buddhist temples also run Chinese Filipino schools in the Philippines, such as the Samantabhadra Institute, Philippine Academy of Sakya, and Philippine Buddhacare Academy.

Roman Catholic Christianity in the Philippines used to also have Hokkien as one of the languages they used to conduct their liturgy in but its current use for ministry is now defunct, especially under the Chinese-Filipino Catholic Apostolate of the Catholic Bishops Conference of the Philippines (CBCP). It has a long history in using Hokkien to minister to Sangley Chinese living in the Philippines and Fujian as evidenced in the works of the Spanish friars, such as the Doctrina Christiana en letra y lingua china (1593), who aimed to use the Sangley Chinese Catholic converts as a catalyst for converting the rest of China.

== Education ==
During the late 20th century, despite Standard Chinese (Mandarin) taking the place as the usual Chinese class subject taught in Chinese Filipino schools as the topic of study, some schools had Chinese teachers that used Amoy Hokkien as medium of instruction in order to teach Mandarin Chinese to native-Hokkien-speaking Chinese Filipino students, but decades later around the Marcos Era, regulations became stricter and the medium of instruction for teaching Standard Chinese (Mandarin) in Chinese classes shifted from Amoy Hokkien Chinese to purely Mandarin Chinese (or in some schools to English). Also, due to the increased rural to urban migration of Chinese Filipinos, Chinese Filipino schools in urban areas increased but those in the provinces gradually declined, some closing down or some turning into ordinary Philippine schools, where some tried to preserve their "Chinese" characteristic by instead teaching Hokkien as their Chinese class subject, deeming it as more practical in the Philippine-Chinese setting.

As of 2019, the Ateneo de Manila University, under their Chinese Studies Programme, offers Hokkien 1 (Chn 8) and Hokkien 2 (Chn 9) as electives. Chiang Kai Shek College offers Hokkien classes in their CKS Language Center.

== Linguistic features ==
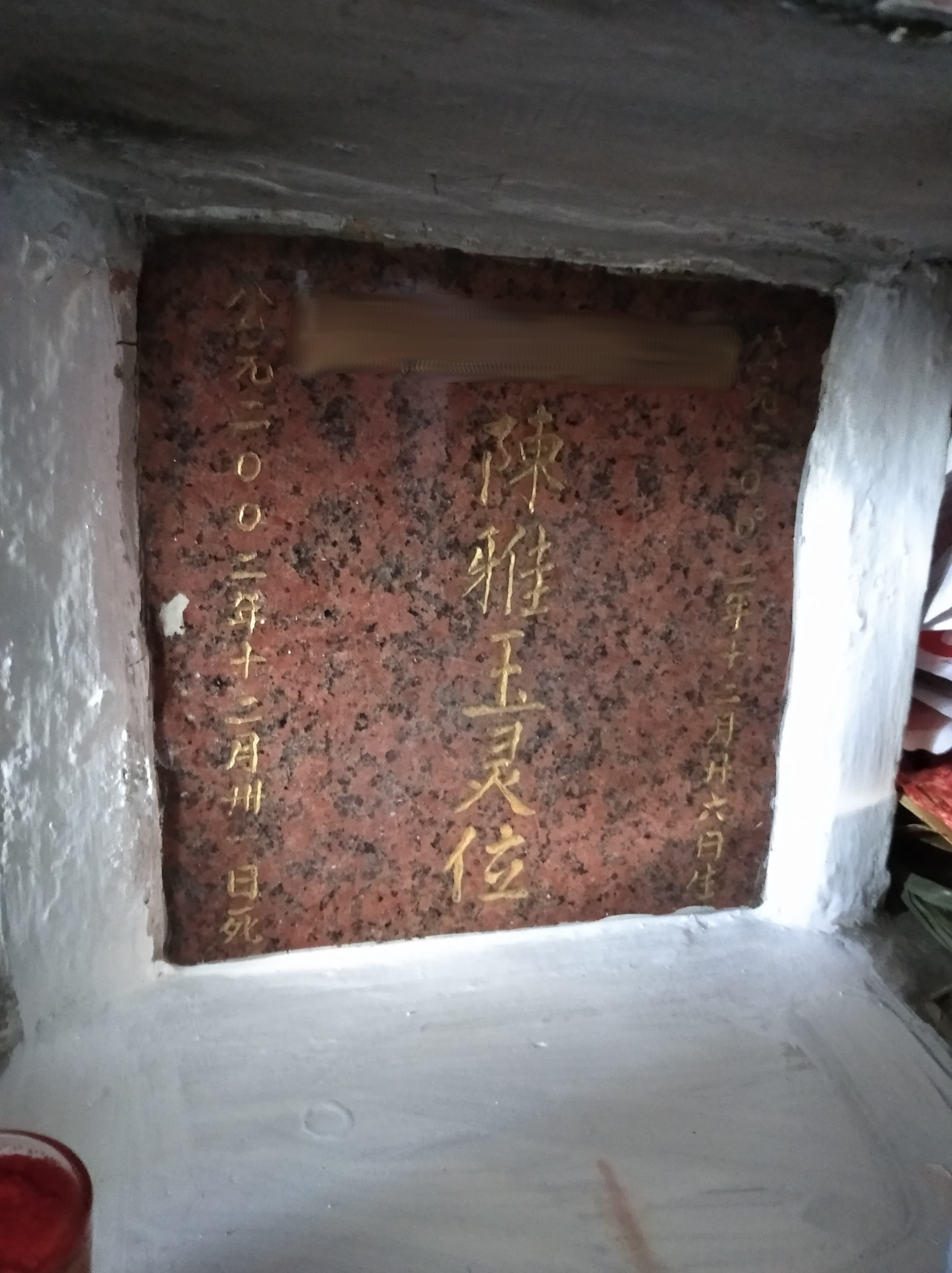
The contractions, 卅 (sam/sap) and 廾 (lia̍p), used on a grave tablet in the Manila Chinese Cemetery.

21st century Philippine Hokkien (咱人話; Lán-nâng-ōe) is largely derived from the Coastal Quanzhou (泉州; Choân-chiu) Hokkien dialects of Jinjiang (晉江; Chìn-kang), Coastal Nan'an (海南安 / 下南安; Hái Lâm-oaⁿ / Ě Lâm-oaⁿ), Shishi (石狮; Chio̍h-sai), Quanzhou City Proper (泉州市; Choân-chiu), Hui’an (惠安; Hūi-oaⁿ), but has possibly also absorbed influences from the adjacent Amoy dialects of Xiamen (廈門; Ē-mn̂g), Coastal Tong’an (同安; Tâng-oaⁿ), Kinmen (金門; Kim-mn̂g), Highland Nan'an (頂南安 / 山南安; Téng Lâm-oaⁿ / Soaⁿ Lâm-oaⁿ), Inland Yongchun (永春; Éng-chhun), and Inland Anxi (安溪; An-khoe) dialects of Xiamen and Highland Quanzhou respectively.

Meanwhile, the older late 16th to 17th century Early Manila Hokkien once spoken around the Manila Bay area was largely derived from Coastal Zhangzhou (漳州; Chiang-chiu) Hokkien dialects of Haicheng (海澄; Hái-têng) and Longxi (龍溪; Liông-khe), with also some features from the Coastal Quanzhou (泉州; Choân-chiu) Hokkien dialects of Anhai (安海; Oaⁿ-hái) and Tong'an (同安; Tâng-oaⁿ). Haicheng and Longxi have since been merged by 1960 within modern-day Longhai (龍海; Liông-hái) of Coastal Zhangzhou (漳州; Chiang-chiu) on the mouth of the Jiulong River (九龍江; Kiú-liông-kang) from where the old smuggling port of Yuegang (月港; Goe̍h-káng) used to operate from, before being overshadowed by the Port of Xiamen (廈門港; Ē-mn̂g Káng) closer to the sea by around the mid-1600s at the Ming-Qing transition due to conflict between the Ming loyalist, Koxinga (國姓爺; Kok-sèng-iâ), and the Qing forces.

Although Philippine Hokkien is generally mutually comprehensible especially with other Quanzhou Hokkien variants, including Singaporean Hokkien and Quanzhou-based Taiwanese Hokkien variants, the local vocabulary, tones, and Filipino or Philippine Spanish and English loanwords as well as the extensive use of contractions and colloquialisms (even those which are now unused or considered archaic or dated in China) can result in confusion among Hokkien speakers from outside of the Philippines.

=== Contractions ===
Some terms have contracted into one syllable. Examples include:

- dī-tsa̍p/lī-tsa̍p (二十) > dia̍p/lia̍p (廿 / 廾): twenty; 20 (same format for 20–29, i.e. 二十一[21] is "dia̍p-it" 廿一)
- saⁿ-tsa̍p (三十) > sap (Note: Not to be confused with sam (三), the literary reading of saⁿ (三), which is also popular for counting numbers among speakers, i.e. 三十五[35] is "sam-gǒ͘" 三五) (卅): thirty; 30 (same format for 30–39, i.e. 三十二[32] is "sa̍p-dī" 卅二)
- sì-tsa̍p (四十) > siap (卌): forty; 40 (same format for 40–49, i.e. 四十三[43] is "siap-saⁿ" 卌三)
- siáⁿ-lâng-á (啥人仔) > siâng-á (誰仔): who
- tsàiⁿ-iūⁿ-á (怎樣仔) > tsiùⁿ-á (障仔): how
- tán—tsi̍t-ě (等一下) > tán—tsě (等際): to wait

=== Vocabulary ===
Philippine Hokkien, like other Southeast Asian variants of Hokkien (e.g. Singaporean Hokkien, Penang Hokkien, Johor Hokkien and Medan Hokkien), has borrowed words from other languages spoken locally, specifically Spanish, Tagalog and English. Examples include:

- lé-chu-chhài /le˩ tsu˧ tsʰai˥˩/: "lettuce", from Spanish lechuga + Hokkien 菜 (chhài, "vegetable")
- ka kaó: "cocoa", either from Spanish cacao or Tagalog kakaw
- ka-pé (咖啡): "coffee", from Tagalog kape, which was from Spanish café
- pà-chî (霸薯): "potato", either from Spanish patata or Tagalog patatas + Hokkien 薯 (chî, "potato")
- kam-á-tit (柑仔得): "tomato", either from Tagalog kamatis or directly from Spanish tomate
- sap-bûn (雪文): "soap", either from Early Modern Spanish jabón (Note: pronounced before in Early Modern Spanish as IPA: /ʃaˈbon/ during the early centuries of Spanish colonial rule in the Philippines) or Tagalog sabon
- pá-lâ (把拉): "to pay", from Spanish paga, inflection of pagar
- lō͘-sin (落申): "dozen", from English dozen
- chi̍p-nî-chhia (集尼車), from Philippine English jeepney + Hokkien 車 (chhia, "vehicle")
- go-ma-ôe: "rubber shoes (sneakers)", from Tagalog goma or Spanish goma + Hokkien 鞋 (ôe, "shoe")
- go-ma-thn̂g: "bubblegum", from Tagalog goma or Spanish goma + Hokkien 糖 (thn̂g, "candy")

Philippine Hokkien has also calqued a few expressions from Philippine English since the American colonial era, such as

- Hó tsá-khí ! (好早起！): "Good Morning!"
- Hó àm-po͘ ! (好暗晡！) / Hó ě-po͘ ! (好下晡！): "Good Afternoon!"
- Hó àm-mî ! (好暗暝！): "Good Evening!"

Philippine Hokkien also has some vocabulary that is unique to it compared to other varieties of Hokkien:

- 車頭 /tsʰia˧ tʰau˩˧/: "chauffeur"
- 山猴 /suã˧ kau˩˧/: "country bumpkin"
- 新山 /ɕin˧ suã˧/, 義山 /ɡi˩ san˧/: "cemetery" (used in the sign for Manila Chinese Cemetery)
- 霸薯 /pa˥˥˦ tsi˨˦/: "potato"
- 麵頭 /bin˩ tʰau˨˦/: "bread"
- 病厝 /pĩ˩ tsʰu˦˩/: "hospital"
- 毋好 /m̩˨ ho˥˥˦/: "to be sick"
- 燒燒 /ɕio˧ ɕio˧/: "to have a fever"
- 桶 /tʰaŋ˥˥˦/, short for 面桶 /bin˧ tʰaŋ˥˥˦/: "million". in other Hokkien varieties, 百萬 /paʔ˥ ban˥˩/ is used instead
- instead of just 翕像 /hip̚˨˦ ɕiɔŋ˨/, there is also 欱像 /hap̚˨˦ ɕiɔŋ˧/: "to photograph"
- instead of just 有時陣 /u˨ ɕi˨ t͡sun˥˩/. there is also 有陣時 /u˨ t͡sun˨ ɕi˨˦/ and, 有陣仔 /u˨ t͡sun˨ a˥˥˦/: "sometimes"
- 熱人 /luaʔ˨ laŋ˨˦/: "hot" (of the weather). in other Hokkien varieties, it means "summer"
- 寒人 /kuã˨ laŋ˨˦/: "cold" (of the weather). in other Hokkien varieties, it means "winter"

Philippine Hokkien usually follows the 3 decimal place Hindu-Arabic numeral system used worldwide, but still retains the concept of 萬; bān; 'ten thousand' from the Chinese numeral system, so 'ten thousand' would be 一萬; chi̍t-bān, but examples of the 3 decimal place logic have produced words like:

- 'eleven thousand' – 十一千; cha̍p-it-chheng, and same idea for succeeding numbers
  Other Hokkien variants: 一萬一千; chi̍t-bān chi̍t-chheng
- 'one hundred thousand' – 一百千; chi̍t-pah-chheng, and same idea for succeeding numbers
  Other Hokkien variants: 十萬; cha̍p-bān
- 'one million' – 一桶; chi̍t-tháng or 一面桶; chi̍t-bīn-tháng, and same idea for succeeding numbers
  Other Hokkien variants: 一百萬; chi̍t-pah-bān
- 'one hundred million' – 一百桶; chi̍t-pah-tháng, and same idea for succeeding numbers
  Other Hokkien variants: 一億; chi̍t-iak

== Hokaglish ==
Hokaglish is code-switching involving Philippine Hokkien, Tagalog and English. Hokaglish shows similarities to Taglish (mixed Tagalog and English), the everyday mesolect register of spoken Filipino language within Metro Manila and its environs.

Both ways of speaking are very common among Chinese Filipinos, who tend to code-switch these languages in everyday conversation, where it can be observed that older generations typically use the Hokkien Chinese sentence structure base while injecting English and Tagalog words while the younger ones use the Filipino/Tagalog sentence structure as the base while injecting the few Hokkien terms they know in the sentence. The latter therefore, in a similar sense with Taglish using Tagalog grammar and syntax, tends to code-mix via conjugating the Hokkien terms the way they do for Filipino/Tagalog words.

In other provinces/regions of the Philippines, a similar code-switching medium is also done with Philippine Hokkien and English, but instead of or along with Tagalog, other regional languages are used as well, such as Cebuano Bisaya (akin to Bislish), Hiligaynon/Ilonggo, Ilocano, Bikolano, Waray, Kapampangan, Pangasinense, etc., so in Metro Cebu, Chinese Filipino families speak a code-switching mix of Philippine Hokkien, Cebuano Bisaya, and Philippine English, while in Metro Davao, Butuan, and Cagayan de Oro (CDO), a mix of Philippine Hokkien, Cebuano Bisaya, Tagalog, Philippine English is used, while in Iloilo and Bacolod, a mix of Philippine Hokkien, Hiligaynon (Ilonggo), and Philippine English is used, while in Vigan and Baguio, a mix of Philippine Hokkien, Ilocano, and Philippine English is used, while in Tacloban, a mix of Philippine Hokkien, Waray, Philippine English is used, while in Naga, a mix of Philippine Hokkien, Central Bikolano, and Philippine English is used, while in Zamboanga City, a mix of Philippine Hokkien, Chavacano, Philippine English, and sometimes Cebuano and/or Tagalog are used.

== See also ==
- Hokkien architecture
- Hokkien culture
- Hokkien media
- Hoklo people
- Holopedia
- Mandarin Chinese in the Philippines
- Medan Hokkien
- Penang Hokkien
- Pe̍h-ōe-jī
- Singaporean Hokkien
- Southern Malaysia Hokkien
- Speak Hokkien Campaign
- Taiwanese Hokkien
- Taiwanese Romanization System
- Written Hokkien

== Sources ==
- Klöter, Henning (2011). The Language of the Sangleys: A Chinese Vernacular in Missionary Sources of the Seventeenth Century. Brill. ISBN 978-90-04-18493-0. - An analysis and facsimile of the Arte de la Lengua Chio-chiu (1620), the oldest extant grammar of Hokkien.
- Van der Loon, Piet (1966). "The Manila Incunabula and Early Hokkien Studies, Part 1" (PDF). Asia Major. New Series. 12: 1–43. Archived from the original (PDF) on February 24, 2021.
- Van der Loon, Piet (1967). "The Manila Incunabula and Early Hokkien Studies, Part 2" (PDF). Asia Major. New Series. 13: 95–186. Archived from the original (PDF) on February 25, 2021.
