= Hoklo Americans =

Americans of Hoklo or Hokkien birth or descent

Hokkien Americans
河洛美國儂, 福建美國儂 Hok ló bí kok lâng, Hok kiàn bí kok lâng

Total population
- 70,000–200,000 (Taiwanese) (2009)

Regions with significant populations
- California, New York City

Languages
- American English, Hokkien, Teochew, Mandarin

Religion
- Buddhism, Taoism, Chinese folk religion, Christianity, Confucianism, Atheism

Related ethnic groups
- Hoklo people, Chinese Americans, Taiwanese Americans

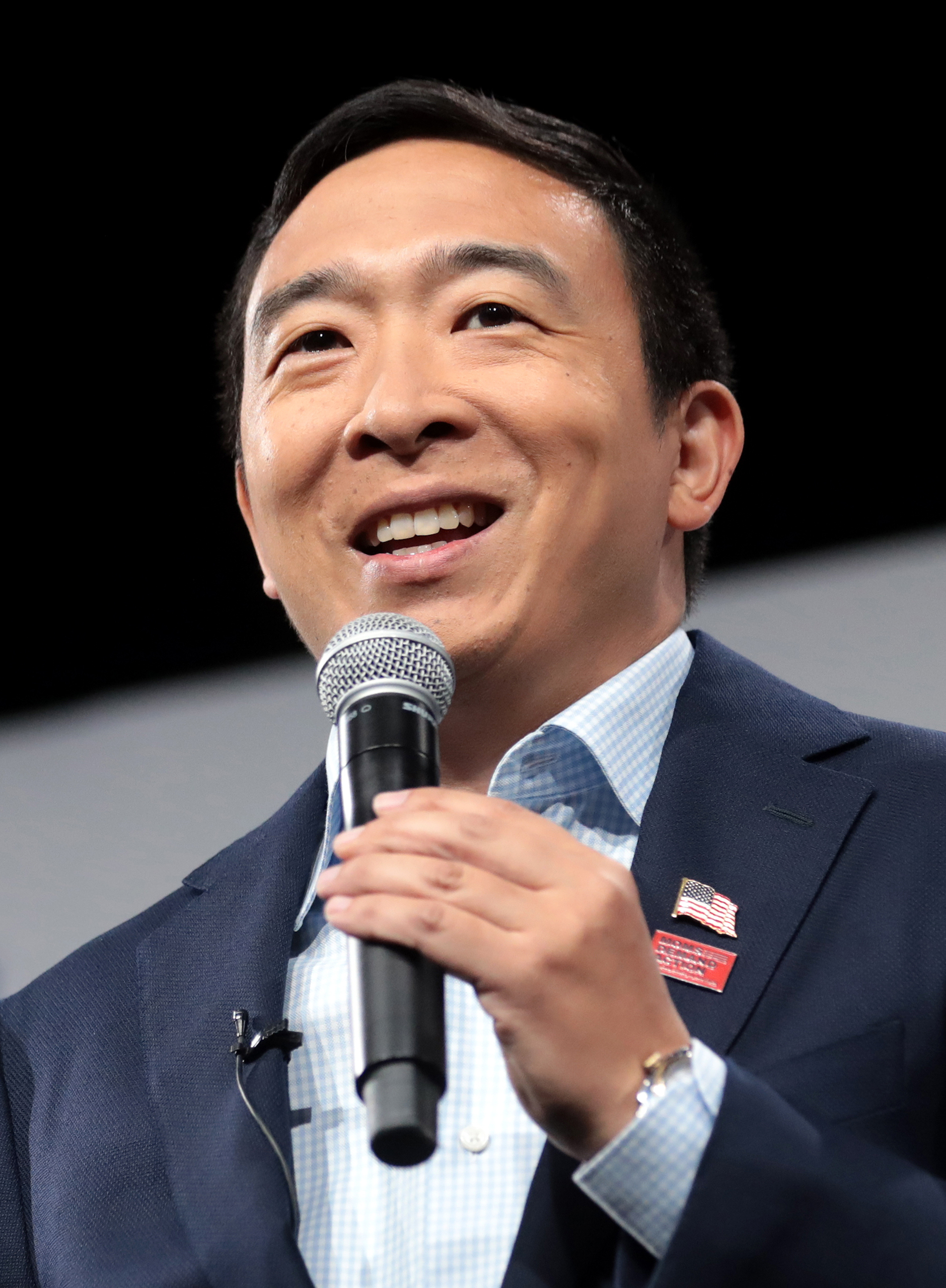
Andrew Yang, New York City mayoral candidate in 2021, of Taiwanese Hokkien descent

Hoklo Americans (Hokkien: 河洛美國儂, romanized: Hok-ló bí-kok-lâng) are Americans of ethnic Hoklo heritage.

The Hoklo are a Han Chinese sub-ethnic group with ancestral roots in Southern Fujian and Eastern Guangdong, particularly around the modern prefecture-level cities of Quanzhou, Zhangzhou, and Xiamen, along with the region of Chaoshan and Hailufeng. These people usually also have roots in the Hokkien diaspora in Taiwan, the Philippines, Malaysia, Indonesia, Singapore, Burma, Thailand, Vietnam, and Cambodia.

== Groups ==
=== Taiwan ===
Although around 70% of Taiwanese people in Taiwan are Hoklo, there are slightly greater proportion of Taiwanese Americans who are Waishengren (those who came to Taiwan after 1945). Furthermore, Hoklo and Hakka people who have roots in Taiwan from before 1945 (Benshengren) are more likely to identify as "Taiwanese". American Community Survey program of the United States Census Bureau reported that 200,000 Americans identify as "Taiwanese Hoklo people" and 70,000 speak Taiwanese Hokkien at home.

=== Southeast Asia ===
The first Indonesians to move to Southern California were Indos (Indonesians of mixed pribumi and European descent). However, the majority of Indonesians who came in the 1960s were of Chinese descent. Unofficial estimates suggest that as many as 50% of the Indonesians in Southern California are of Chinese descent, and around 50% of the ethnic Chinese population in Indonesia is Hoklo.

Chinese Filipinos are one of the largest overseas Chinese communities in Southeast Asia. Mestizos de Sangley—Filipinos with at least some Chinese ancestry—comprise 18-27% of the Philippine population, totaling up to 30 million people. There are approximately 2 million Filipinos with pure Chinese ancestry, or around 2.5% of the population. Hoklo people form 98.7% of all unmixed ethnic Chinese in the Philippines. Of the Hoklo peoples, about 75% are from Quanzhou prefecture (specifically, Jinjiang City), 23% are from Zhangzhou prefecture, and 2% are from Xiamen City.

Teochew people and Hainanese people may occasionally be included as Minnan people.

== History ==
Some coolies and laborers in Hawaii during the 1800s were from southern Fukien. There is a Hoklo cemetery in the Pauoa Valley in Honolulu.

Researchers have looked upon the patterns of immigration of Filipinos to the United States and have recognized four significant waves. The first was connected to the period when the Philippines was part of New Spain and later the Spanish East Indies; Filipinos, via the Manila galleons, would migrate to North America.

The second wave was during the period when the Philippines were a territory of the United States; as U.S. Nationals, Filipinos were unrestricted from immigrating to the US by the Immigration Act of 1917 that restricted other Asians. This wave of immigration has been referred to as the manong generation. Filipinos of this wave came for different reasons, but the majority were laborers, predominantly Ilocano and Visayan. This wave of immigration was distinct from other Asian Americans, due to American influences, and education, in the Philippines; thefore they did not see themselves as aliens when they immigrated to the United States. During the Great Depression, Filipino Americans were also affected, losing jobs, and being the target of race-based violence. This wave of immigration ended due to the Philippine Independence Act in 1934, which restricted immigration to 50 persons a year.

Some Hokkien people in the Philippines adopted romanized Hokkien surnames during Spanish colonial times, many of which end with "-co" (Chinese: 哥; Pe̍h-ōe-jī: ko; lit. 'older brother'), an honorific suffix that used to be used by Hokkien Chinese Filipinos appended to the end of their Hokkien Chinese given name. Many also end with "-son" and "-zon" (Chinese: 孫; Pe̍h-ōe-jī: sun; lit. 'grandson') because the surname was a romanized Hokkien word that described which line of descendants the patriarch was from, either through birth order or which generation from their Hokkien-speaking ancestor. Some of these surnames were also brought to America.

Hoklo Taiwanese people are about 70% of the population of Taiwan, but the first wave of Taiwanese immigrants to America were mostly Waishengren, most of whom were not Hoklo. Hoklo people started immigrating in larger numbers after the 1960s.

== Notable people ==
- Chen Baiyu, or just Baiyu, singer born in Xiamen
- Ma Sicong (馬思聰; 1912-1987), Chinese violinist and composer born in Haifeng, Guangdong
- Yuan Tseh Lee (李遠哲; 1936-), Nobel Prize winner in Chemistry, he served as a professor emeritus at the University of California, Berkeley (He was a Hoklo American until 1994 when he renounced his American citizenship to become President of Academia Sinica)
- Nick Chou (周湯豪; 1988-), Taiwanese actor and singer.
- Amy Chua (蔡美兒; 1962-), writer of Battle Hymn of the Tiger Mother, Filipino
- Leon O. Chua (蔡少棠; 1936-), professor at the University of California, Berkeley and inventor of Chua's circuit
- Zhijian Chen (陳志堅; 1966-), the 2019 Breakthrough Prize in Life Sciences winner.
- Lanhee Chen (陳仁宜; 1978-), an American policy expert, academic, and political commentator. Chen currently serves as the Director of Domestic Policy Studies and lecturer at Stanford University, and Lecturer in Law at Stanford Law School
- Janet Hsieh (謝怡芬; 1980-), television star and model.
- Richard Koo (辜朝明; 1954), Chief Economist at the Nomura Research Institute.
- Jeremy Lin (林書豪; 1988-), NBA player
- Carl Chang (張君培; 1969–), tennis player, older brother of Michael Chang
- Michael Chang (張德培; 1972–), tennis player
- Yang Yang (楊陽; 1958-), physicist, solar cells
- Andrew Yang, US politician

== Bibliography ==
- Yang, Eveline (2001), "Indonesian Americans", in Lehman, Jeffrey, Gale Encyclopedia of Multicultural America, 2 (second ed.), Gale Group, pp. 897–905, ISBN 978-0-7876-3986-0
- Barnes, Jessica S.; Bennett, Claudette E. (February 2002), The Asian Population: 2000 (PDF), U.S. Census 2000, U.S. Department of Commerce, retrieved 2009-09-30
- Cunningham, Clark E. (2009), "Unity and Diversity among Indonesian Migrants to the United States", in Ling, Huping, Emerging Voices: Experiences of Underrepresented Asian Americans, Rutgers University Press, pp. 90–125, ISBN 978-0-8135-4342-0
- Sukmana, Damai (January 2009), "Game of Chance: Chinese Indonesians Play Asylum Roulette in the United States", Inside Indonesia, 95, ISSN 0814-1185, retrieved 31 January 2010
- Ding, Picus Sizhi, Southern Min (Hokkien) as a Migrating Language, Springer, 2016
- Brown, Melissa J., Is Taiwan Chinese?: The Impact of Culture, Power, and Migration on Changing Identities (Berkeley Series in Interdisciplinary Studies of China), University of California Press, 2004
- edited by Robin M Boylorn, Mark P Orbe, Critical Autoethnography: Intersecting Cultural Identities in Everyday Life, Routledge, 2013
