= Hoklo Taiwanese =

Ethnic group in Taiwan

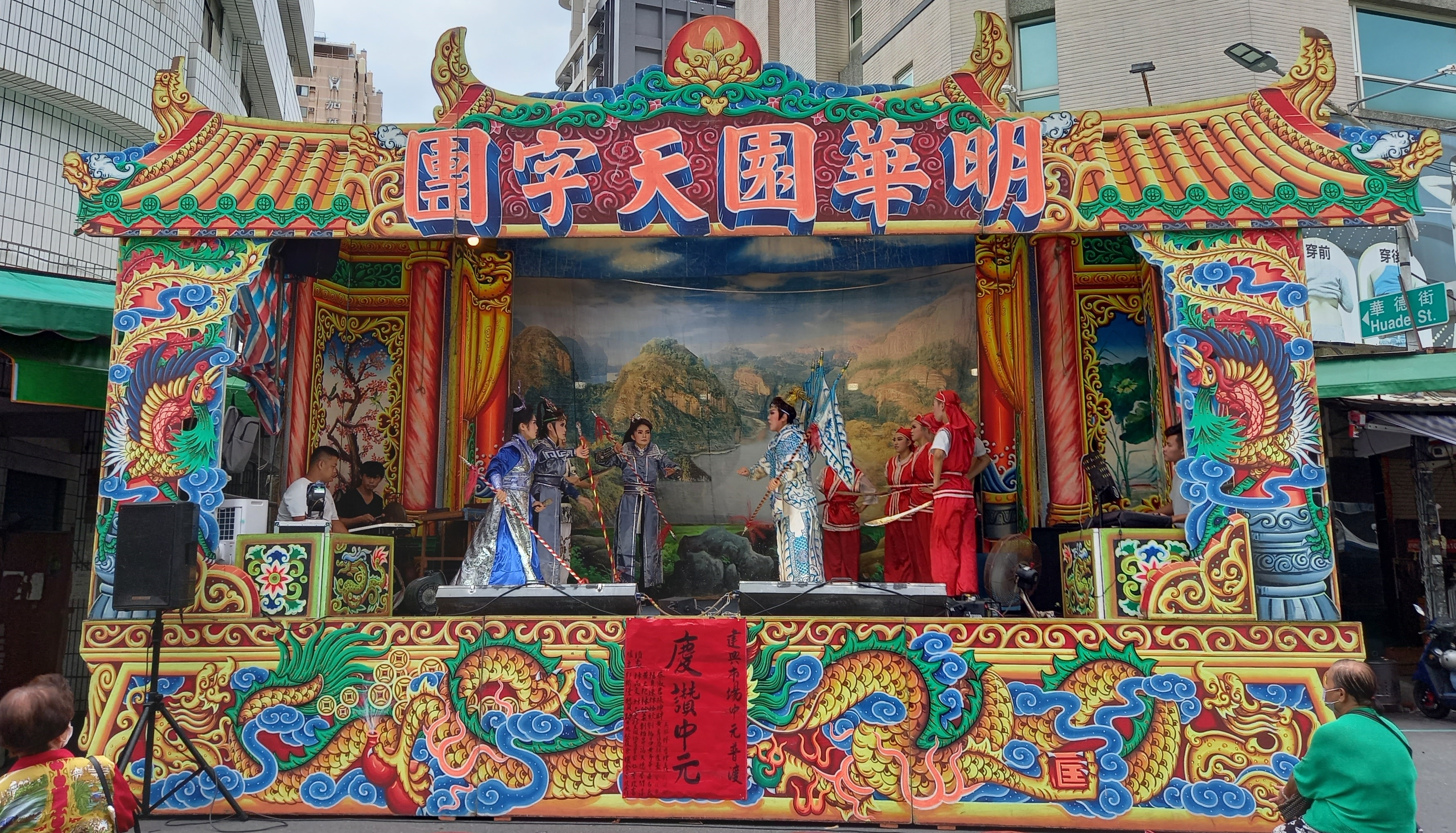
- Ke-Tse opera is a representative Hoklo Taiwanese traditional art

Total population
- c. 16–18 million Approximately 70 to 77% of Taiwan population

Regions with significant populations
- Taiwan, Penghu

Languages
- Taiwanese Hokkien; Taiwanese Mandarin

Religion
- Majority: Buddhism; Han folk religion; Confucianism; Taoism; Animism; Minorities: Chinese Salvationist; Christianity; Islam; Baháʼísm; Shintoism; Other: Irreligion

Related ethnic groups
- Hoklo people, Han Taiwanese, Plains Aborigines, Minyue

Hoklo Taiwanese or Holo people (Chinese: 河洛人/鶴老人/福佬人; Pe̍h-ōe-jī: Ho̍h-ló-lâng) are a major ethnic group in Taiwan whose ancestry is wholly or partially Hoklo, with Hokkien as their native language. Being Taiwanese of Han origin, their mother tongue is Taiwanese (Tâi-oân-ōe or Tâi-gí), also known as Taiwanese Hokkien. After World War II and the Retrocession of Taiwan, most Hoklo Taiwanese also became fluent in Taiwanese Mandarin as a result of the Republic of China (ROC) national language policy.

The majority trace their roots to the Hoklo communities of modern Quanzhou and Zhangzhou in Southern Fujian, China, whose ancestors migrated to Taiwan from the 17th century beginning with early movements encouraged under Dutch colonial rule. In common usage, a Hoklo Taiwanese identity refers to those whose families settled on the island before the mid twentieth century, a group also described as benshengren when considered together with other early Chinese settlers. Even so, most Hoklo Taiwanese simply identify themselves as Taiwanese.

== See also ==
- Hoklo people
- Hoklo Americans
- Taiwanese people
- Taiwanese Americans
- Hakka Taiwanese
- Han Taiwanese
- Hoklo chauvinism
