= Sangley =

Archaic terms used in the Philippines

Mestizo de Sangley Chinese Mestizo
Mestisong Sangley/Tsino
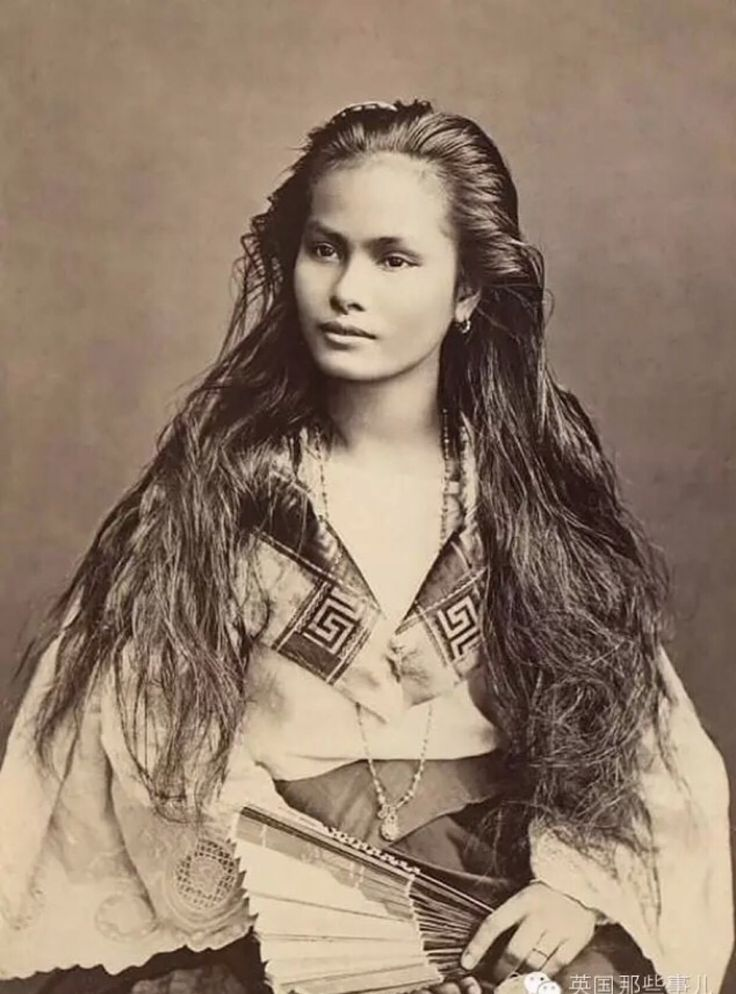
- A mestiza de sangley, c. 1875

Languages
- Native; Tagalog, Cebuano, Chavacano, Ilocano, Hiligaynon/Ilonggo, Waray-Waray, Bicolano, Kapampangan, Pangasinense, Aklanon, Maranao, Tausug, Yakan, Maguindanaon, Chavacano, Kinaray-a, Surigaonon and other Philippine languages Also; Filipino, English; Historically; Spanish

Religion
- Predominantly; Christianity (mainly Catholic with significant Protestant minority); Minority; Sunni Islam, Animism

Related ethnic groups
- Chinese Filipinos, Filipino mestizos

Sangley (English plural: Sangleys; Spanish plural: Sangleyes) and Mestizo de Sangley (Sangley mestizo, mestisong Sangley, chino mestizo or Chinese mestizo) are archaic terms used in the Philippines during the Spanish colonial era to describe respectively a person of pure overseas Chinese ancestry as well as a person of mixed Chinese and native Filipino or Spanish ancestry. The Sangley Chinese were ancestors to both modern Chinese Filipinos and modern Filipino mestizo descendants of the Mestizos de Sangley, also known as Chinese mestizos, which are mixed descendants of Sangley Chinese and native Filipinos. Chinese mestizos were mestizos (mixed peoples) in the Spanish Empire, classified together with other Filipino mestizos.

The Spanish had such categories as indios (Spanish: indio, lit. 'Indian' for natives of the East Indies), mestizos de Español (descendants of colonial ethnic Spanish and native-born Filipinos), the tornatrás (Spanish-Chinese mestizos, descendants of colonial Spanish Filipinos and Sangley Chinese), the mestizos de Bombay (Indian mestizos, descendants of colonial Indian Filipinos and native Filipinos), mestizos de japoneses (Japanese mestizos, descendants of colonial Japanese Filipinos and native Filipinos), etc.

Overseas Chinese entered the Philippines as traders prior to Spanish colonization. Many emigrated to the Philippines, establishing concentrated communities first in Manila and throughout the island of Luzon, then in other cities and settlements throughout the archipelago, historically going from Luzon to Visayas and Mindanao.

Other Filipino terms that refer to ethnic Chinese or Filipinos with Chinese ancestry:

- Intsik (derived from the Philippine Hokkien Chinese: 引叔; Pe̍h-ōe-jī: ín-chek; lit. 'uncle') is the native, colloquial informal term in Tagalog/Filipino and other Philippine languages used to refer to Chinese people in general, albeit some speakers prefer 'Tsino' (see below) due to some perceived informal vulgar connotations.
- Chinoy or Tsinoy (a blend of Spanish: Chino, lit. 'Chinese' or Tagalog: Tsino, lit. 'Chinese' with Tagalog: Pinoy, lit. 'Filipino' or the Tagalog: -oy, lit. 'diminutive suffix') is a modern term currently used in Philippine English and Tagalog/Filipino and other Philippine languages to refer to a Filipino citizen or permanent resident of either mixed (whether partial or half or majority descent) or pure Chinese descent born and/or raised in the Philippines, also known as ''Chinese Filipinos'' or ''Fil-Chi''.
- Chino or Tsino is derived from Spanish and literally means "Chinese". "Tsino" is the formal and literary spelling in Tagalog/Filipino and other Philippine languages.
- Chinito or Tsinito is a term derived from Spanish and means "a young Chinese man", from Spanish: Chino, lit. 'Chinese' with the diminutive suffix -ito 'male diminutive suffix'. "Tsinito" is the spelling in Tagalog/Filipino and other Philippine languages.
- Chinita or Tsinita is the feminine form of the above, meaning "a young Chinese woman", also from Spanish: Chino, lit. 'Chinese' with -ita 'female diminutive suffix'. "Tsinita" is the spelling in Tagalog/Filipino and other Philippine languages.
- Chekwa or Tsekwa is an offensive derogatory slang or slur referring to both Filipinos with Chinese ancestry, and Chinese people in general. It is derived from Cebuano Bisaya as an elided compound of Cebuano: Insik, lit. 'Chinese' + wákang 'ethnic slur expression used to tease Chinese', from "Insik wákang, káun, kalibang!", a derogatory Visayan children's limerick from the late Spanish colonial era, where "Insik"/"Intsik" was originally the Philippine Hokkien Chinese: 引叔; Pe̍h-ōe-jī: ín-chek; lit. 'uncle', and "wákang" from 我工; guá kang; 'I work'. The last two words come from Cebuano: kaon, lit. 'to eat' and Cebuano: kalibang, lit. 'to defecate'; The full phrase was thus "Chinese (laborer), I work, eat, and shit!" and was when opium dens were rampant, with many Chinese migrants working as low-wage laborers.
- Langlang (derived from Philippine Hokkien Chinese: 咱人; Pe̍h-ōe-jī: lán-lâng; lit. 'our people') is a very obsolete term in Tagalog referring to ethnic Chinese persons. It is recorded in the 1613 Vocabulario de la lengua tagala, where its entry reads in Early Modern Spanish: Sangley) Langlang (pc) anſi llamauan los viejos deſtos [a los] ſangleyes cuando venian [a tratar] con ellos, lit. 'Sangley) Langlang (pc) this is what the elderlies called [the] Sangleys when they came [to deal] with them'. This has long fallen out of use except in food such as Pancit Langlang from Cavite. The etymon, Philippine Hokkien Chinese: 咱人; Pe̍h-ōe-jī: lán-lâng; lit. 'our people', retains its meaning and is still used primarily in Philippine Hokkien by Chinese Filipinos as an endonym.

== Etymology ==
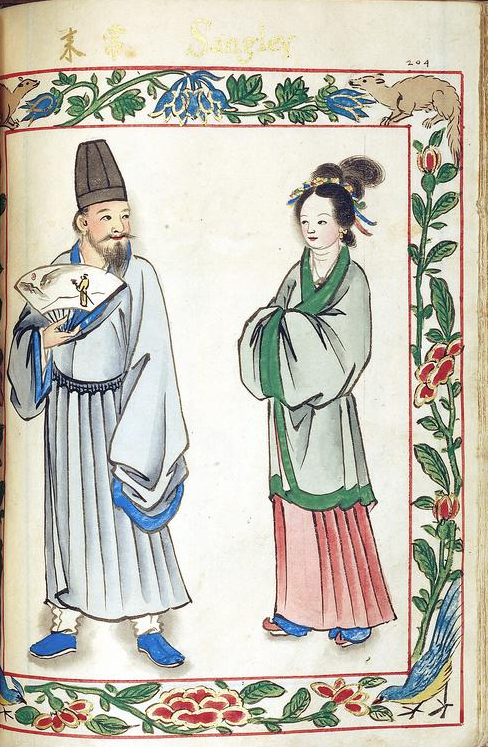
Sangley couple in Boxer Codex (circa 1590), with the label, "來常 Sangley" on top with the Chinese characters traditionally written right to left and when read in the old Chiangchiu dialect of Hokkien Chinese: 常來; Pe̍h-ōe-jī: siâng lâi; lit. 'frequently comes'.

There are multiple versions of the interpretation on the word Sangley, especially as it is also used in historical place names such as Punta Sangley (Sangley Point), the northern promontory point and former US naval base headquarters in the Cavite Peninsula. Generally, Sangley is usually believed or purported to literally mean "merchant traveler" or "frequent visitor." According to Go Bon Juan, the most commonly accepted version is usually that the term "sangley" comes from the Hokkien Chinese: 生理; Pe̍h-ōe-jī: Seng-lí, IPA: /ɕiɪŋ³³ li⁵⁵⁴/; lit. 'business', which is consistent with the business background of the early Chinese in the Philippines. According to Saul Hofileña Jr on the history of Sangley Point, the name supposedly derived from 'xiangli, a Chinese word for 'trader', which became "sangley" to the Spaniards. According to Go Bon Juan, Hofileña had apparently based this on the pronunciation of the word "trader" in Chinese: 商旅; pinyin: shānglǚ; Pe̍h-ōe-jī: siang-lú / siang-lír / siang-lí; lit. 'traveling merchant', which Go Bon Juan considered "a rather literal term uncommon among early Chinese in the Philippines", although Hokkien Chinese: 商旅; Pe̍h-ōe-jī: siang-lú is indeed recorded in the Dictionario Hispanico Sinicum (1626-1642) that the Dominican Spanish friars recorded before in Manila as one of the terms listed as Spanish: mercader, lit. 'merchant'. Another cited possible etymon is the Hokkien Chinese: 常來; Pe̍h-ōe-jī: siâng lâi; lit. 'frequently comes', which appeared beside "Sangley" labeled in the Boxer Codex (circa 1590s), Dasmariñas record to the King of Spain, which also contains the probable earliest romanization of Japan as "Iapon." It is said that the late William Henry Scott, an authority on Philippine history, had seen this picture and supported this version. Additionally, the Bocabulario de la lengua sangleya por las letraz de el A.B.C. (1617) also offers two explanations, it also gives Hokkien Chinese: 常來; Pe̍h-ōe-jī: siâng lâi explaining it as "he who comes very often" and Hokkien Chinese: 商來; Pe̍h-ōe-jī: siang lâi which it explains as "those who come to trade" which the Bocabulario however prefers the latter. In Wenceslao Retana's Diccionario de filipinismos (1921), the entry for Sangley was also recorded before as (sic):

Sangley (del chino xiang-lay, mercader.) adj. Nombre que en lo antiguo se dio en Filipinas a los mercaderes chinos, y que luego se hizo genérico de los de esta raza residentes en aquellas islas
Sangley (from Chinese xiang-lay, merchant.) adj. Name that in ancient times was given in the Philippines to Chinese merchants, and that later became generic to those of this race residing in those islands.

— Wenceslao E. Retaña, Diccionario de filipinismos, con la revisión de lo que al respecto lleva publicado la Real academia española (1921)

Spanish Governor-General Francisco de Sande also notes in his Relacion y Descripciones de las Islas Filipinas ("Relation and Description of the Filipinas Islands", 1576) as per Manuel (1948):

Throughout these islands they call the Chinese 'Sangleyes', meaning 'a people who come and go,' on account of their habit of coming annually to these islands to trade, or, as they say there, 'the regular port'.

— Francisco de Sande, Relacion y Descripciones de las Islas Filipinas ("Relation and Description of the Filipinas Islands", circa 1576)

The majority of Chinese sojourners, traders, and settlers in the Philippines during the Spanish colonial period came from southern Fujian and spoke Hokkien, leaving their mark on Filipino culture (especially the cuisine). Although mestizo de sangley literally means "mixed-race (person) of business," it implies a "mixed-race (person) of Chinese and indigenous/Indio (Filipino) descent" because many early Chinese immigrants were traders and intermixed with the local population. Outside the Philippines, the Spanish word mestizo (without the qualifying de sangley) is normally used to refer to persons of mixed European and non-European ancestry, but the lower number of European mestizos in the Philippines made the term mestizo come to mean mestizo de sangley. For example, Benito Legarda used this definition when talking to the United States Philippine Commission (1899–1900), citing Wenceslao Retana's Diccionario de filipinismos (1921). The term chino mestizo was also used interchangeably with mestizo de sangley.

In 16th to 19th century Spanish Philippines, the term mestizo de sangley differentiated ethnic Chinese from other types of island mestizos (such as those of mixed Indio and Spanish ancestry, who were fewer in number. Their Indio ancestry made the Chinese mestizos be granted the legal status of colonial subjects of Spain, with certain rights and privileges denied to the pure-blooded Chinese immigrants (sangleys).

Today, Tsinoy or Chinoy (from portmanteau of Filipino word Tsino or Chino in Spanish, and the Filipino word Pinoy) is widely used in Filipino/Tagalog and other Philippine languages to describe a Sangley, a person born of pure ethnic Han Chinese descent or of mixed native Filipino and Han Chinese ancestry or a person with likewise similar features.

== Background ==
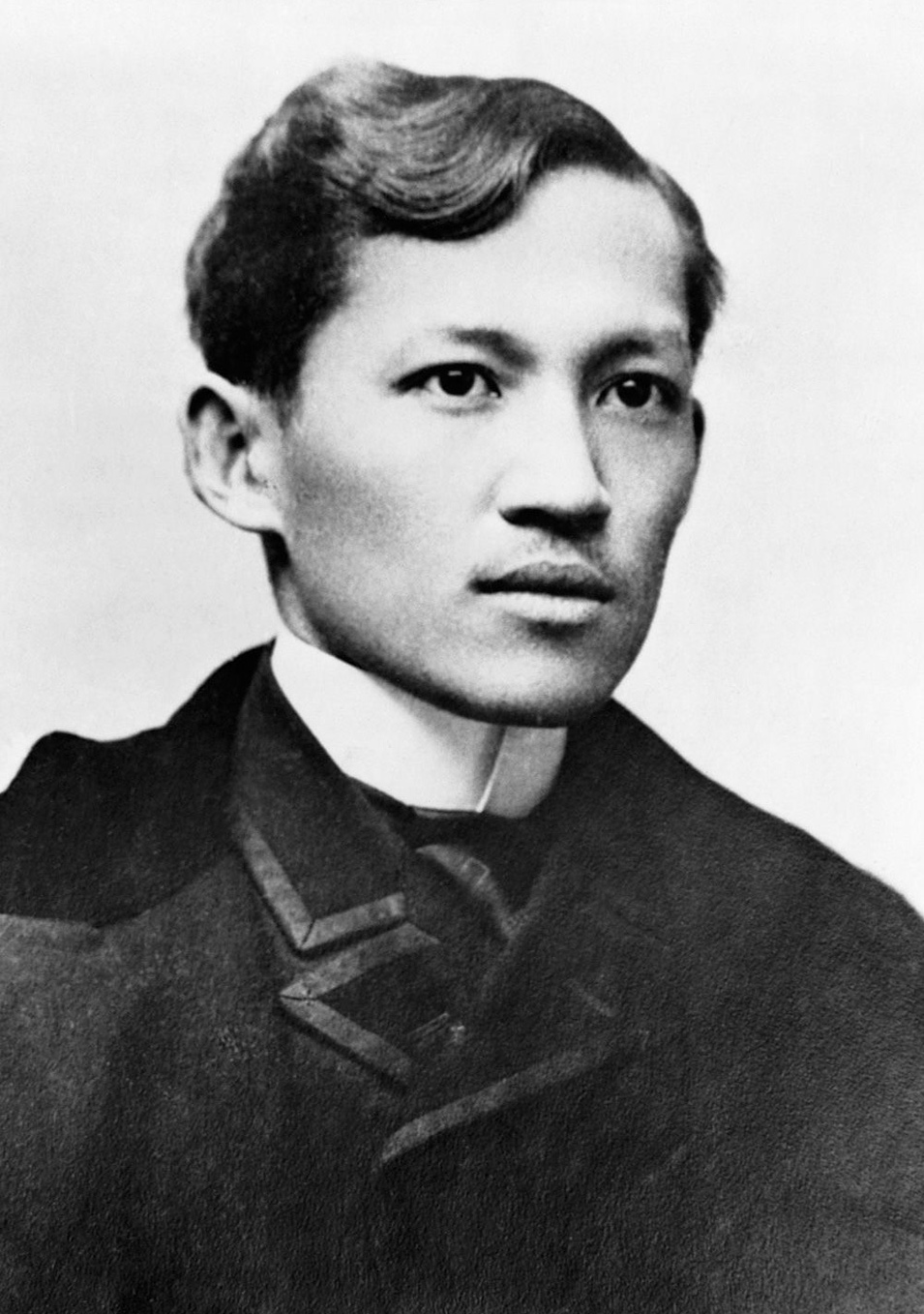
José Rizal, the Philippine National Hero, was a mestizo de sangley but also had other ancestry.

Mestizo de sangley is a term that arose during Spanish colonization of the Philippines, where circumstances were different from colonial settlement of the Americas. During the Spanish colonization of the Americas of the 16th and 17th centuries, numerous male Spaniards (conquistadors, explorers, missionaries, and soldiers) settled there. For decades most Spanish men made liaisons and intermarried with indigenous women; their children were considered mixed race and were called mestizo.

Male Chinese traders and workers came during the colonial period, most of whom intermarried with native women. The Spanish government classified the anyone who had ancestry from China as Sangley regardless of their ethnic makeup. Their mixed-race descendants with native women were classified as Mestizo de sangley; they were also known as chino mestizos.

As an example, in the late 19th century, the author and activist José Rizal was classified as mestizo de sangley due to his partial Chinese ancestry. But he also had indigenous, Japanese, and Spanish ancestors, and he asked to be classified as Indio.

== History ==
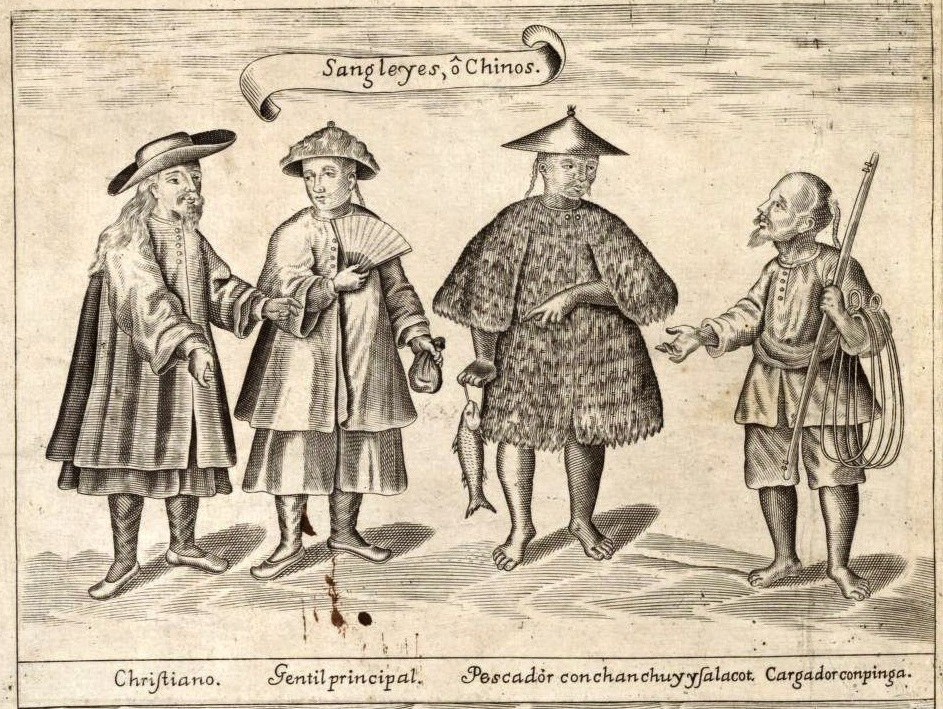
Sangleys as depicted in the Carta Hydrographica y Chorographica de las Yslas Filipinas (1734)

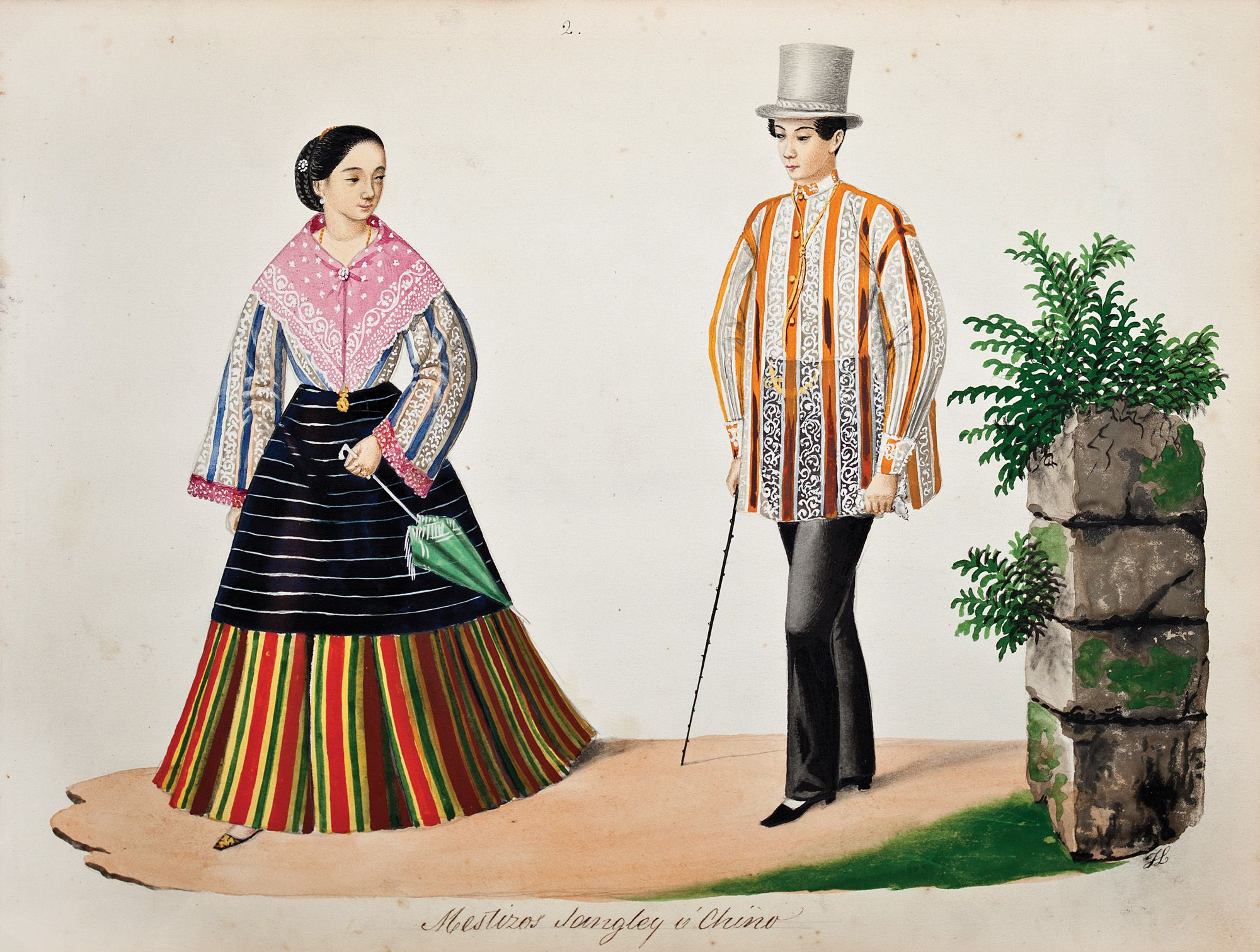
Mestizos Sangley y Chino (Sangley Chinese and/or Chinese Mestizos), c. 1841 Tipos del País, watercolor by Justiniano Asuncion

Spanish explorers and conquistadors landed in Las Islas de Filipinas, which they named in honor of Philip II of Spain. The Spanish colonization of the Philippines required more skilled laborers and they recruited Chinese immigrants. The economy became highly dependent upon the Chinese for their economic role as traders and artisans. Most of the Chinese living in the Manila area settled in a place called the Parían near Intramuros.

The Spanish encouraged those China traders to convert to Catholicism. Many of the Chinese men married native women, and over time the multi-cultural mestizo de sangley caste developed. Although the colonial government never required them to adopt Spanish surnames, in many cases they chose to change their Chinese names. They adopted names such as Jalandoni, Laurel, Lopez, Osmeña, Palanca, Paterno, Rizal, etc., or used transliteration and Spanish phonetic spelling to make them appear Hispanic by concatenation, for example: Asico, Biazon, Chanco, Cojuangco, Cuyangkeng, Goquilay, Lacson, Landicho, Laoinco, Locsin, Ongpin, Quebengco, Sylianco, Tanbengco, Tanchanco, Tanjuatco, Tetangco, Tiongson, Tuazon, Yaptinchay, Yuchenco, Yuchengco, Yupangco, etc.

The ancient Chinese has historically had culturally chauvinist views towards people from the Philippines, whom they referred to as savages. This view intensified after the Spanish colonized the archipelago, where the people, including Spanish officials, were referred by the Chinese as xiao xiyang ("small Western Ocean") or barbarians. In 1574, a few years after the Spaniards established Manila as the colonial capital of the Philippines, the Chinese pirate Limahong (Teochiu Chinese: 林阿鳳; Pe̍h-ōe-jī: Lîm A-hŏng) attacked Manila and burned it to the ground. He retreated later to other places around the Luzon coast, where his forces continued killing and looting. Some of them stayed in the Philippines such as Limahong's male lover Eng Kang who later became the godson of the Spanish governor and renamed as Juan Baptista de Vera, allowing him to assimilate and partake in Philippine society without fear of consequences from Spanish authorities. Some crew of Limahang settled down and had children with native Indios. Many Sangleys, like Limahong and Eng Kang, had traditional homosexual relationships with either other Sangleys or native Indios. The Spanish, who themselves has racist views towards the Sangleys or Chinese, wanted to expel all Sangleys from the Philippines for a long time. After learning of the Sangley traditional homosexual bond system, the Spanish, especially the clergy, weaponized it to justify the massacre of many Sangley male lovers, with the intention of clearing the Philippines from any Sangleys.

== Economy ==
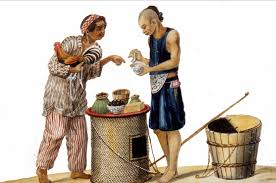
A native Filipino trades with a Sangley vendor

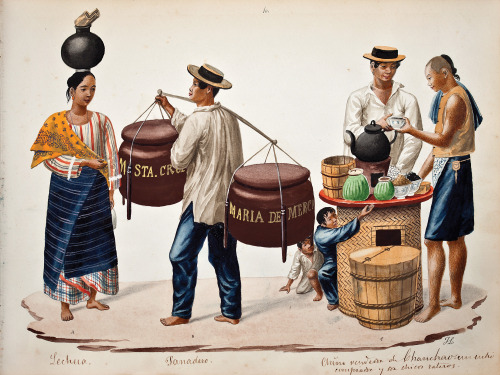
Sangley vendor among other local vendors

Most of the sangleys worked as skilled artisans or traders. Aside from shopkeeping, the sangleys earned their livelihood as carpenters, tailors, cobblers, locksmiths, masons, metalsmiths, weavers, bakers, carvers and other skilled craftsmen. As metalsmiths, they helped to build the Spanish galleons in shipyards located in Cavite. As masons, they built Intramuros and its numerous structures.

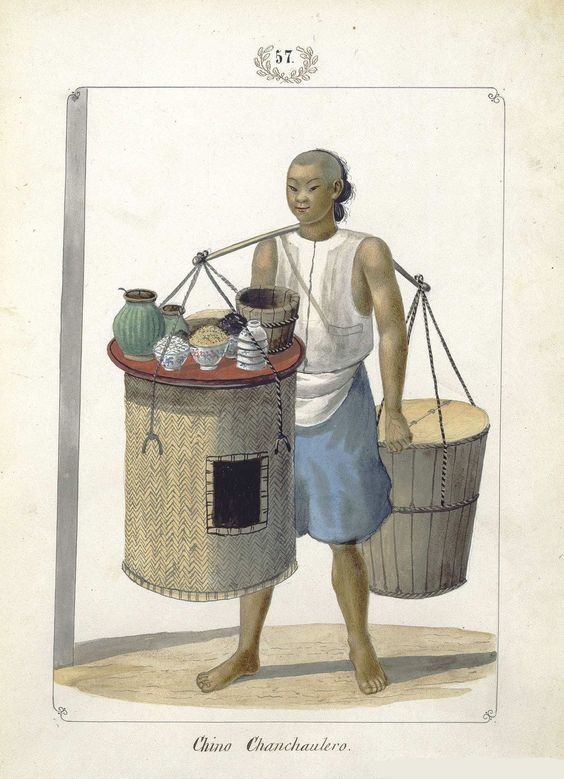
Chino Chanchaulero by José Honorato Lozano

The Spanish gave the mestizos de sangley special rights and privileges as colonial subjects of the Spanish Crown and as baptized converts to the Catholic Church. They were given preference to handle the domestic trade of the islands. In addition, they were allowed to lease land from the friar estates through the inquilino or lessee system, that allowed them to sublet those lands.

Later, the mestizos de sangley came to acquire many native lands, chiefly through a legal instrument called pacto de retro or contract of retrocession. Through this instrument, a moneylender extended loans to farmers, who in exchange for cash, pawned their land with the option of buying it back. In the event of default, the moneylender recovered the loan by foreclosing on the land from the farmer. Many local farmers lost their lands to mestizos de sangley in this manner.

The Spanish Galleon Trade (1565–1815) tied China to Europe via Manila and Acapulco, Mexico. Acting as a transshipment port, Manila attracted Chinese traders from Xiamen (Amoy); they traveled in armed ships to trade with the Spanish. Chinese luxury goods, such as silk, porcelain and finely crafted furniture, were exchanged for silver from Mexican and Peruvian mines. Twice a year the galleons sailed across the Pacific Ocean from Manila to Acapulco and back. The goods were later shipped to Spain via Veracruz, a Gulf Coast port on the Atlantic side of Mexico.

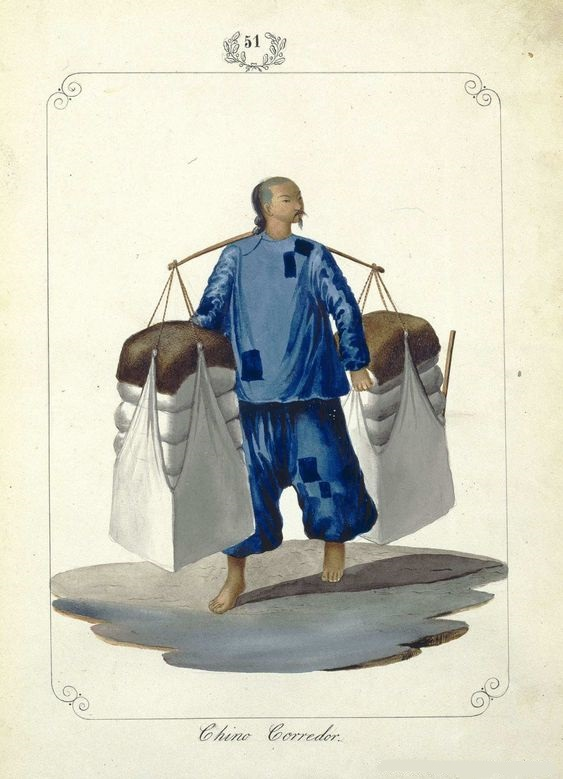
Chino Corredor (Chinese Runner/Deliveryman) by José Honorato Lozano

As the Spanish galleons carried mostly Chinese luxury goods destined for Europe, Mexicans called them náos de China (Chinese ships). The Spanish galleon trade was mainly a business affair involving Spanish officials in Manila, Mexico and Spain, and Chinese traders from Xiamen. The highly lucrative galleon trade carried few products originating from the Philippine islands or involving resident domestic traders. The trade was so profitable that Mexican silver became an unofficial currency of Southern China; an estimated one-third of silver mined from the Americas flowed into China during that period. The Spanish galleons also transported Filipino crew and militia men to the Americas, among which were many Sangleys; Some of them chose to settle in Mexico, Louisiana, and parts of present United States, specially California. Americans called these immigrants Manilamen and the Mexicans called them los indios Chinos.

Apart from the Portuguese-controlled Macao-Manila trade in the 17th century and the British-controlled Madras-Manila trade in the 18th century, it was chiefly the Spanish-controlled Manila-Acapulco trade that sustained the colony for much of the period. When the trade ended with the last ship's sailing in 1815, the Spaniards needed new sources of revenue. With the Spanish American wars of independence resulting in the loss of Spain's colonies in the Americas, the Spanish government quickly lost its position of pre-eminence amongst the Western powers.

After losing Mexico when it became independent in 1821, Spain took over direct control of the Philippines. It had been governed by the Virreinato de Nueva España or Viceroyalty of New Spain (Mexico) during much of the colonial period. Coinciding with the advent of steamships and the consequent expansion of the global economy, the Spaniards decided to open up the Philippines to foreign trade. They appointed Governor-General Basco y Vargas, who was instrumental in establishing the tobacco monopoly in the Philippines, though with much help from other Spanish interests and reliance on Filipino local elites, called the principalía.

As the subsistence economy shifted to an export crop economy, for sugar, abaca and tobacco, in 1834 the Spanish allowed both non-Spanish Westerners and Chinese immigrants to settle anywhere in the islands. The mestizos de sangley had been displaced from tobacco marketing as the Spanish established their monopoly. Some wholesale and retail traders converted their capital into larger landholdings. They developed sugar plantations for the new export market, particularly in Central Luzon, and on the islands of Cebu, Iloilo and Negros. The mestizos de sangley took advantage of the rapid changes as the colonial economy was integrated into the markets of the Western world.

From the late 18th century through much of the 19th century, the Spanish encouraged development of tobacco as another commodity crop, controlling it as a monopoly. Cultivation was concentrated in Cagayan, where the Spanish relied on the principalía to have their workers produce and deliver the tobacco.

With the opening of the colony to foreign trade in 1834, Western merchants established import/export and financial companies in Binondo. They partnered with Chinese wholesale/retail traders throughout the islands. The mestizos de sangley shifted to the export crop economy by developing and enlarging plantations devoted to agricultural commodities.

The increase in the late 19th century of British and American commercial interests in Manila coincided with the British founding of a network of treaty port-cities in Hong Kong, Singapore and Shanghai. They also expanded the Nanyang trade, previously limited to Xiamen, Quanzhou and Macao.

In 1868, the United States and China signed the Treaty of Burlingame, legalizing and liberalizing Chinese emigration, which had been illegal since the Ming dynasty. This led to a rapid increase in the population of Overseas Chinese traders in the Philippines. By the 1870s, the economic dominance of the British and American merchants and their Chinese trading partners was said by some observers to turn the Philippines into an "Anglo-Chinese Colony under the Spanish Flag".

== Politics ==
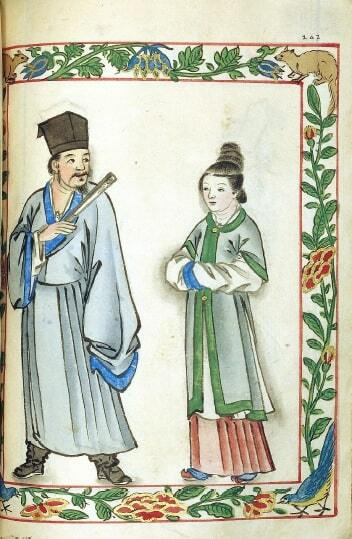
Another Sangley couple in Boxer Codex c. 1590.

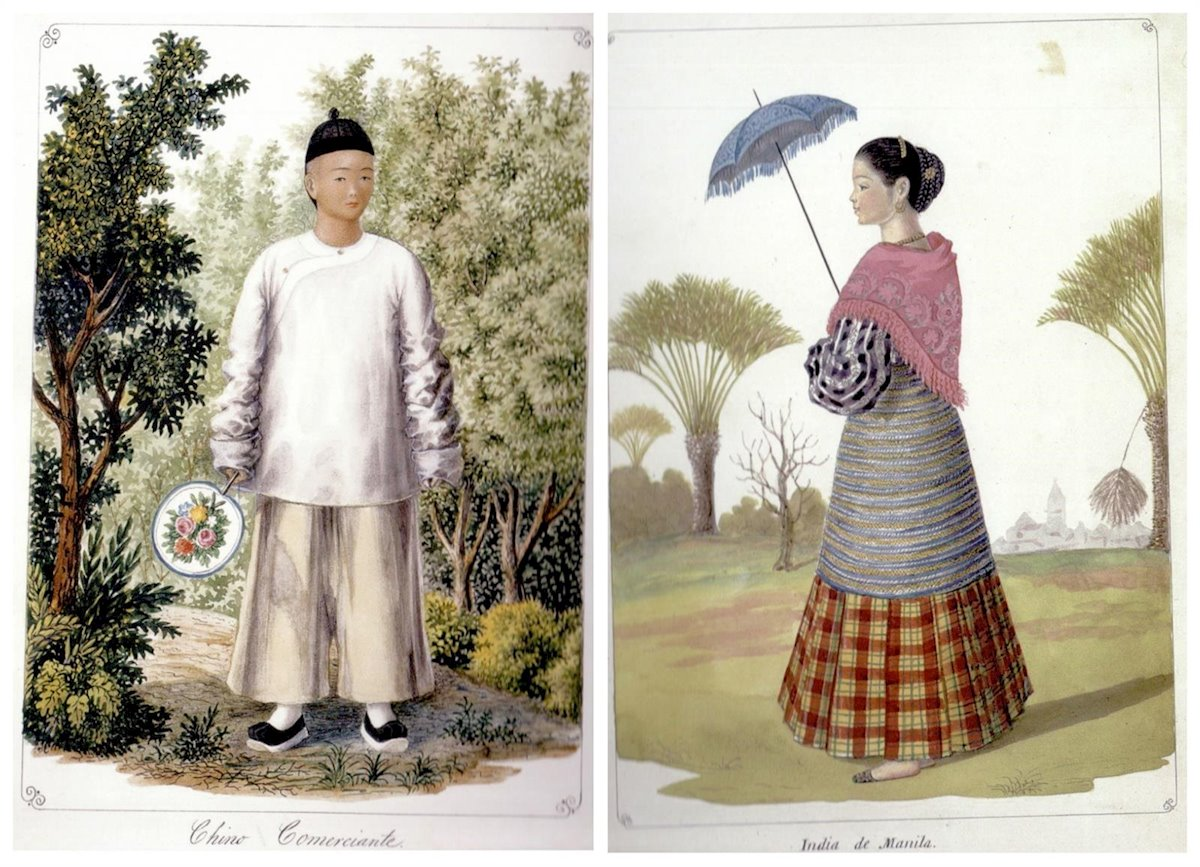
Sangley Chinese Merchant & Native Filipina of Manila by José Honorato Lozano

The Spanish authorities had initially depended upon the sangleys to both supply the labor and manage the colonial economy of the islands. However, after the attacks of the Chinese pirate Limahong, the Spanish colonists viewed the sangleys differently, fearing them as enemy aliens who posed a security threat due to their number. To protect their precarious position, the Spaniards enacted policies designed to control the residents of the islands by means of racial segregation and cultural assimilation, such as limiting the number of resident sangleys to around 6,000, a measure that was proved soon impossible to maintain.

The Spanish founded the Parían in 1581 in what became Manila as the official marketplace and designated residence for the sangleys who did not convert to Catholicism. Circumventing a royal decree outlawing the sangleys, as governor-general of the Philippines, Gómez Pérez Dasmariñas created Binondo in 1594 for the Catholic sangleys and their indio wives and their mestizos de sangley children and descendants. He gave the sangleys and mestizo de sangleys a land grant in perpetuity. They were allowed to establish a self-governing organization, called Gremio de Mestizos de Binondo (Guild of Mestizos of Binondo).

The Spanish colonists attempted to assimilate the sangleys into the Hispanic culture and converted many to Catholicism. They allowed Catholic sangleys to intermarry with indio women. They did not recognize marriages of the unconverted sangleys, as they did not officially sanction marriages among subjects that were performed outside the Catholic Church.

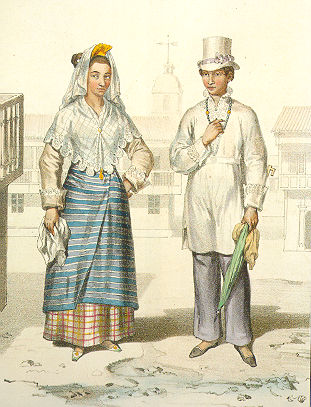
French Illustration of a Chinese-Filipino mestizo couple, c.1846 by Jean Mallat de Bassilan

Beginning in 1600, the first generation of mestizos de sangley formed a small community of several hundred in Binondo. This is where San Lorenzo Ruiz grew up in the early 1600s. He was martyred under torture in Japan with three missionaries; none would recant their Christian beliefs. Long venerated in the Philippines, he later was beatified by the Catholic Church and canonized in 1987 as the first Filipino saint.

During the 17th century, the Spaniards carried out four great massacres and expulsions against the unconverted sangleys, usually generated from real or imagined fears of an imminent invasion from China. In the aftermath, many sangleys converted at least nominally to Catholicism, adopted Hispanicized names, and intermarried with indio women.

Contemporary 21st century historians have studied demographic and social changes in the Philippines during this period. They note the changes in how mestizo de sangley fared in Philippine society. In the late 18th century, the mestizo de sangley began to markedly improved their position. After the violence and turmoil of the Spanish expulsion of Chinese-Filipino population for having sided with the British in their 1762 capture of Manila,

mestizo economic power increased in conjunction with its social and political clout. The formation of auxiliary units called Real Princípe in Tondo mirrored these trends. Spanish military commanders publicly expressed a preference for mestizo regiments over native militias, enraging Filipino indio elites and requiring a deft negotiation of the political realities in Manila.

—

The founding of Chinese mestizo regiments in the Philippines was part of New Spain's military modernization during the reformist Bourbon era. At the same time, New Spain created a colonial militia in Latin America, also enrolling mestizos there. While the colonies developed in distinct ways, there were similarities in the rise of the mestizo classes in Latin American and the Philippines. When colonial authorities accepted them into the militias and armed them, it was in recognition of their rising social position and integration into the colonial economies.

After the Spanish colonists abolished the Parían in 1790, they allowed the sangleys to settle in Binondo. In the 19th century, the population of mestizos de sangley grew rapidly over the years as more Chinese male immigrants arrived, converted to Catholicism, settled in Binondo and intermarried with indio or mestizo de sangley women. With no legal restrictions on their movement, mestizos de sangley migrated to other areas in the course of work and business, such as Tondo, Bulacan, Pampanga, Bataan, Cavite, Cebu, Iloilo, Samar, Capiz, etc. The number of unconverted sangleys dropped from a high of 25,000 prior to the first great massacre of 1603 to below 10,000 by 1850.

From the 18th century until the latter half of the 19th century, Spanish authorities came to depend upon the mestizos de sangley as the bourgeoisie of the colonial economy. From their concentration in Binondo, Manila, the mestizos de sangley migrated to Central Luzon, Cebu, Iloilo, Negros and Cavite to handle the domestic trade of the islands. From trading, they branched out into landleasing, moneylending and later landholding. With wealth, they gained the ability to give their children elite education at the best schools in the islands and later in Europe.

Following the promulgation of the Cádiz Constitution of 1812, the Philippines was granted the status of a Spanish province, with representation in the Spanish Cortes. These subjects were granted Spanish citizenship, thus acquiring legal equality in the Philippines with Spanish-born Spaniards. Toward the end of Spanish rule in the 19th century, the mestizos de sangley identified as Filipinos (a term which previously referred to Spanish creoles only), showing their identification with these islands. The dominance of the mestizos de sangley was a distinctive feature of the Philippines which categorically distinguished it from Spanish America, where the elites were non-Chinese mestizos. The Philippine mestizos became a class of wealthy quasi-feudal hacendados in the Philippine countryside, growing to become a "national oligarchy" under United States rule.

Also identifying as the "true sons of Spain", the mestizos de sangley tended to side with the white Spanish colonists during the numerous indio revolts against Spanish rule. In the late 19th century, José Rizal, a fifth-generation mestizo de sangley, arose as an intellectual from the relatively wealthy, middle-class, Spanish-educated Filipinos known as Ilustrados. He was among those who called for reforms in the administration of the colony, integration as a province of Spain, and political representation for the Philippines in the Spanish Cortes.

== Culture ==
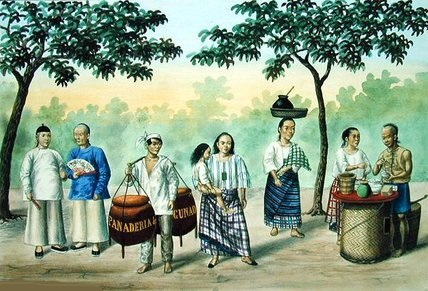
A Scene In Town (w/ Sangley & Chinese Mestizos), c. 1847 Tipos del País Watercolor by José Honorato Lozano

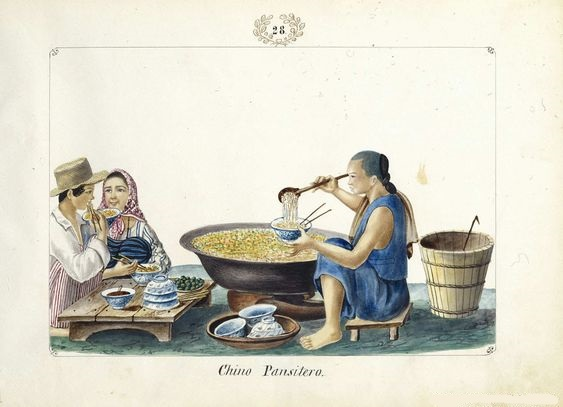
Chino Pansitero(Chinese Pancit Vendor) by José Honorato Lozano

From the beginning of the colonial period in the Philippines, the Spanish administration had the goal of converting natives to Catholicism. Missionaries were among the Spanish settlers in the colony. With the help of the colonial government, religious orders built traditional stone-and-brick churches throughout the islands in the Spanish or Mexican Baroque style. Constructed within the walled-city of Intramuros, San Agustin Church was the first stone church built in the archipelago. It became the spiritual center of Christianity in the Philippines, and also in Asia. The remains of Miguel López de Legazpi, Juan de Salcedo and Martín de Goiti (who was killed during Limahong's siege) were interred in that church. The church was sacked during the Battle of Manila in 1762, before being rebuilt in 1854.

The Spanish colonial government established schools and colleges run mostly by religious orders, including the Colegio de San Juan de Letran, the Ateneo Municipal, the Universidad de Santo Tomás in Manila, or the Colegio de San Ildefonso in Cebu, that accepted all types of students, regardless of race, gender or financial status in the case of primary grade instruction. In 1863, the Spanish government established a modern system of free public education, the first of its kind in Asia.

Binondo served as the traditional center of community life for the Catholic sangleys and mestizos de sangley. The Gremio de Mestizos de Binondo was the official guild chartered to administer community affairs. Born in Binondo, San Lorenzo Ruiz was a mestizo de sangley who served as an altar boy in the Binondo Church (which has since been named after him). Established by the Spanish Dominicans for Catholic sangleys, the Binondo Church is now known as the Minor Basilica of San Lorenzo Ruiz. It became the center site for the religious rites of the community. The Catholic mestizos de sangley expressed religious devotion with processions marking important occasions, such as the Feast of La Naval de Manila, commemorating the naval victory of the Spanish over the Dutch off Manila Bay in 1646.

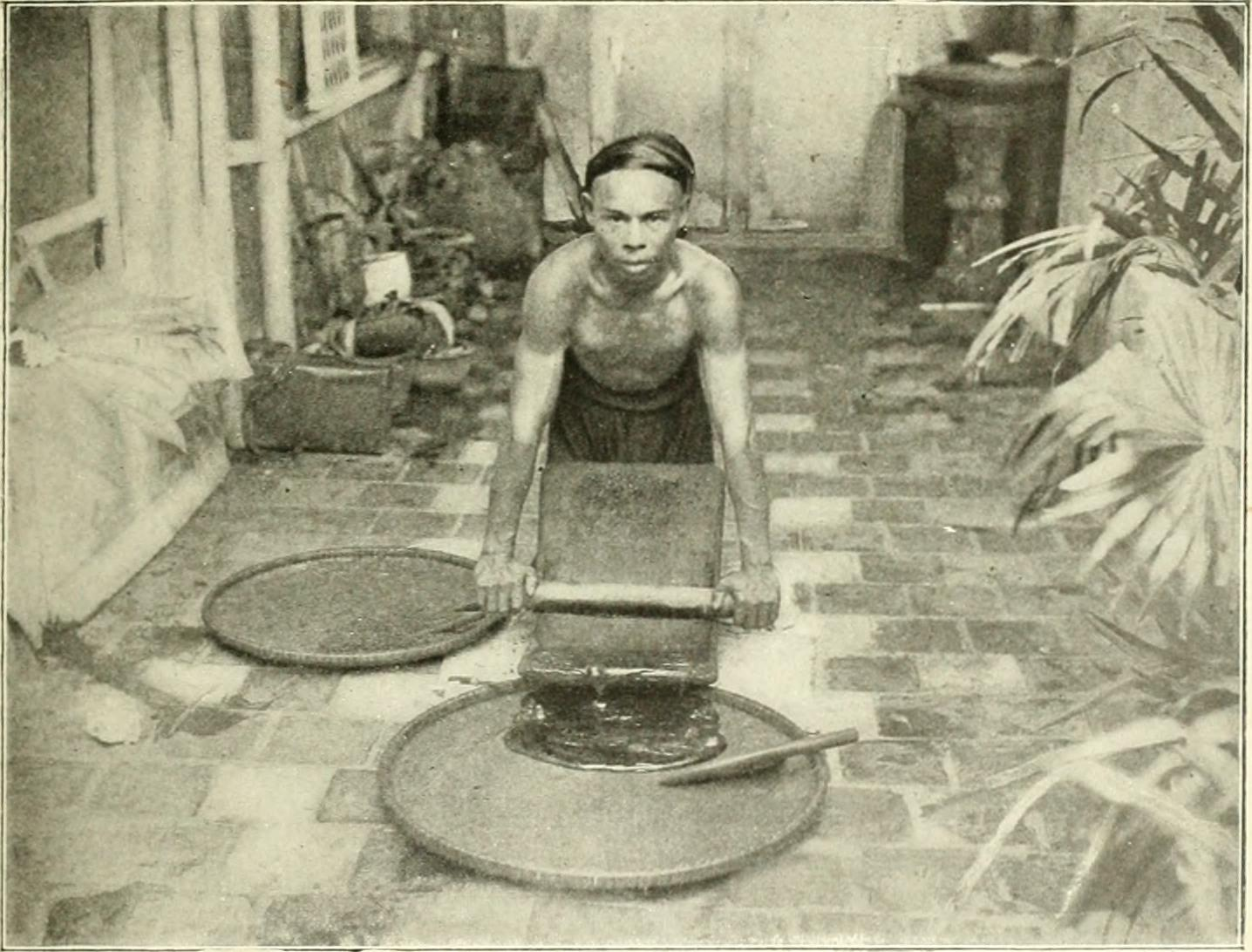
Sangley Chinese latik maker (1899)

In the late 19th century, cosmopolitan mercantilism emerged in Binondo, at the same time that Western and overseas Chinese merchants entered the island's economy, which was being integrated into the global trading system. The Spaniards tended to be more isolated from the new urban environment. They lived in Intramuros, where Hispanic Catholicism dominated the walled city. The rapid urbanization elsewhere transformed the ethnic enclave of Binondo into a thriving commercial district within an expanding urban core. The overseas Chinese (traditional Chinese: 華僑; pinyin: Huáqiáo) merchants essentially displaced the mestizos de sangley from their role as the domestic traders of the islands. Although officially under Spanish rule, cosmopolitan Binondo became the semi-official capital of an "Anglo-Chinese colony" in the late 19th-century Philippines.

Chinese-Filipino merchants dominated the textile industry in Molo and Jaro. Iloilo produced sinamay, a hand-woven cloth made from fine abaca threads, which was used for the casual camisa de chino; jusi (Chinese term for raw silk), a translucent fabric woven from silk yarn for the formal barong tagalog; and piña, a handwoven fabric made of pineapple fiber for heirloom garments. During the late 19th century, the mestizos de sangley wore embroidered barong tagalog while indios wore multicolored camisa de chino. As a means of maintaining social stratification, the Spanish prohibited the indios from wearing European-style clothing, as a means of separating the groups.

In food, Chinese-Filipinos adapted Hokkien food from Fujian. They used indigenous ingredients and Spanish names to improvise what became part of an evolving creole Filipino cuisine. During the 19th century, noodle shops called panciterias serving comida China (Chinese food) dotted the islands. The ubiquitous pancit (meaning "noodle" from the Hokkien word pian-e-sit) became pancit luglog and lomi (flavored with sauce); mami (served with broth); pancit molo (cooked as pasta) and pancit Malabon (mixed with seafood). The Chinese brought their use of rice as a staple (and wet-rice agriculture). One result was the local rice porridge called arroz caldo. Other well-known Filipino dishes such as lumpia (egg-roll), maki (soup dish), kiampong (fried rice) and ma-chang (sticky rice,) among others, trace their origins to the Chinese immigrants.

In Vigan, Ilocos Sur, known as kasanglayan (meaning "where sangleys live"), prosperous Chinese-Filipino merchants built stone-and-wood houses (really brick and wood) called bahay na bato. These followed some of the tradition of Malay village houses-on-stilts, called bahay kubo, but instead of using bamboo and thatch, they used molave-wood structural beams to frame the two-story house. Walls were formed of brick coated with plaster. Sliding window panels made with translucent capiz shells, in latticework patterns, enclosed the typically large horizontal windows. On the outside, sliding wooden shutters could cover the windows for another layer of privacy and ventilation control. This area has been designated as a historic district.

In contrast to the typical stone-and-brick Spanish colonial houses, this style of residence was better suited to the tropical environment of the islands. It was more flexible, so could better withstand frequent earthquakes. The steep roofs with overhanging eaves provided shelter against rain and storms, and added to the sense of openness and space connecting the interior and exterior. These helped shield residents from seasonal monsoons. During less severe rain and in the hot summers, the sliding windows could be opened to allow greater circulation of air and more light into the house. When illuminated at night, such houses resemble giant Chinese lanterns. The stone/brick-and-wood house became so widespread throughout the islands that this Chinese-Filipino merchant's house came to be known as the "colonial Filipino" style.

The mestizos de sangley synthesized a hybrid culture incorporating Hispanic and European influences with both indigenous and Asian elements. In fashion, cuisine, design and architecture, a distinctive style emerged, especially among the wealthier segment. As the sangley prospered from trading, they built the first and in many cases the only stone-and-wood houses in the countryside. Like other rising elites, they created forms of conspicuous consumption to signify their status. The mestizos de sangley held feasts to commemorate baptisms, weddings, funerals and processions. As the 19th century drew to a close, the colonial Spanish empire in the Philippines was defeated by the rising Western empire of the United States following the Spanish–American War.

Following the war, the United States took possession of the Philippines and influenced its culture in turn. The Filipinos, including the mestizos de sangley, were referred to as "little brown Americans". The Philippines was made a protectorate in relation to the United States, with the residents given special status but not U.S. citizenship at the time.

== See also ==
- Binondo
- Cambodian Hokkien
- Chinese Filipino
- Criollo people
- Filipino mestizo
- Hokkien and Hoklo Americans
- Japanese settlement in the Philippines
- Mestizo
- Nanyang (region)
- Peranakan of Malaysia, Singapore, Brunei, Indonesia, and Thailand
- Minh Hương of Vietnam
