= Sino-Philippine Treaty of Amity =

1947 treaty between the Philippines and China

Treaty of Amity between the Republic of China and the Republic of the Philippines 中華民國菲律賓共和國友好條約
- Signed: April 18, 1947
- Signatories: (Philippines) Manuel Roxas; (Taiwan) Chen Chih-ping (Chinese: 陳質平)
- Parties: Philippines
- Language: English, Chinese

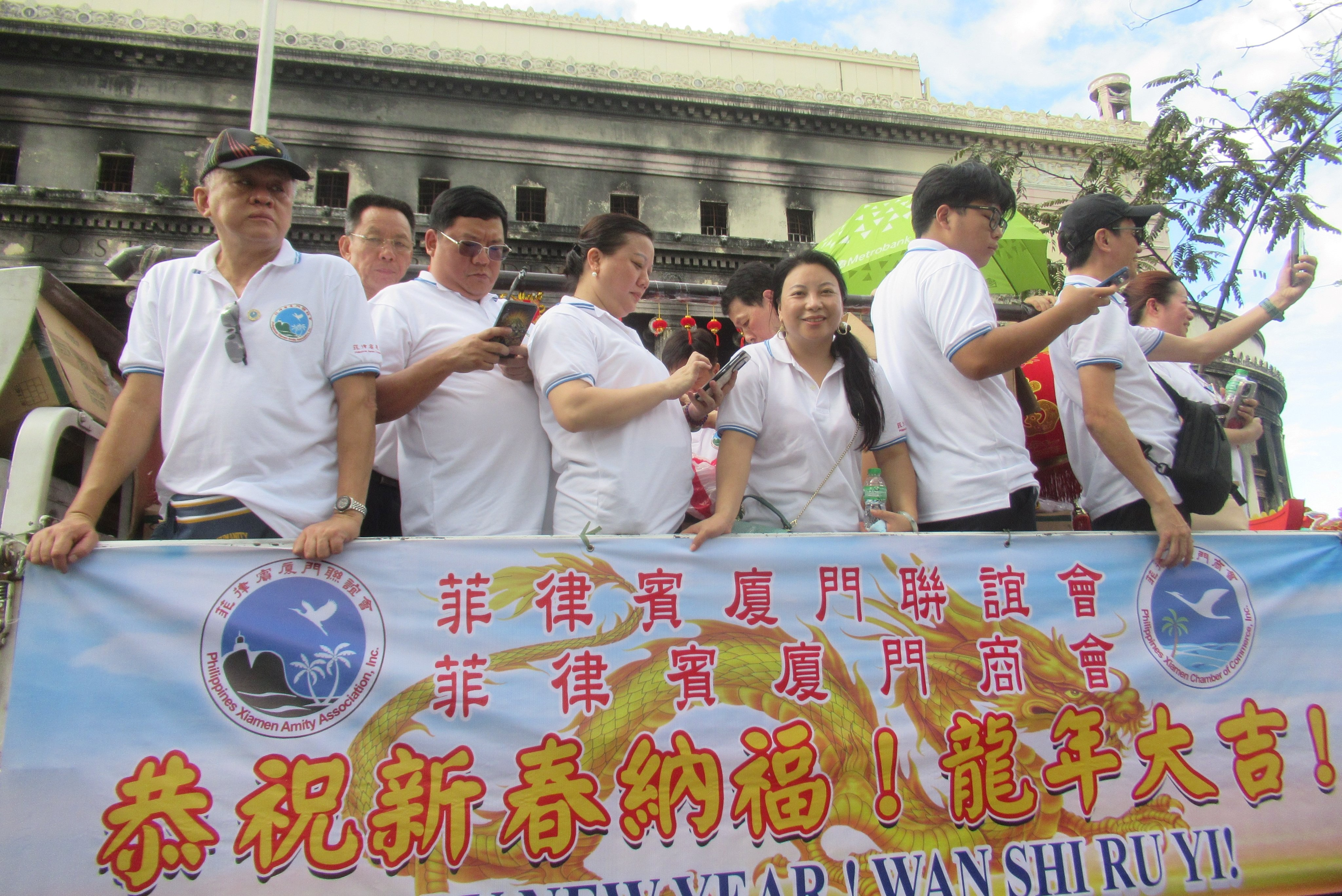
Manila Chinatown Solidarity Parade Chinese New Year 2024

The Sino-Philippine Treaty of Amity (Chinese: 中華民國菲律賓共和國友好條約; pinyin: Zhōnghuá Mínguó Fēilǜbīn Gònghéguó Yǒuhǎo Tiáoyuē) was a treaty signed by the Republic of the Philippines and the Republic of China in 1947. The treaty contains provisions which ensures "perpetual peace and everlasting amity" between the two countries.

== See also ==
- Philippines–Taiwan relations
- Chinese Filipino
- History of the Philippines
