= World News (newspaper) =

Chinese-language newspaper in the Philippines

- The front page of the World News on February 19, 2016
- Native name: 菲律賓世界日報
- Type: Daily newspaper
- Format: Broadsheet
- Owner: World News Publication Corporation
- Publisher: Florencio Tan Mallare
- Founded: 1981
- Political alignment: Pro-China
- Language: Chinese
- Headquarters: Binondo, Manila, Philippines
- Circulation: 36,000 (as of 2008)
- Website: worldnews.net.ph

The World News (Chinese: 菲律賓世界日報; pinyin: Fēilǜbīn Shìjiè Rìbào; Pe̍h-ōe-jī: Hui-li̍p-pin Sè-kài Li̍t-pò, lit. 'Philippine World News') is a daily broadsheet newspaper in the Philippines written in the Chinese language. Founded in 1981, it is currently the Philippines' largest Chinese-language newspaper in terms of circulation, with a circulation of 36,000 as of 2008.

== History ==
The World News was founded in 1981 by Florencio Tan Mallare (陳華岳; Chén Huáyuè; Tân Hôa-ga̍k), a lawyer from Macalelon, Quezon, who also worked as a reporter for the Chinese Commercial News. After the normalization of relations between the Philippines and the People's Republic of China in 1975, Mallare established the World News as an alternative to the largely pro-ROC, pro-Kuomintang mainstream Chinese-language press, catering to both Chinese Filipinos who would prefer news about China from other points of view as well as the growing number of mainland Chinese migrants to the Philippines who did not necessarily share the pro-Taiwan stance of more established Chinese Filipinos.

In 2011, the newspaper was awarded two Distinguished Media Practitioners Awards from the World Chinese Media Cooperation Union of the People's Republic of China for its efforts in building understanding between China, the Philippines and the world, beating out 200 other overseas Chinese publications.

== Editorial policy ==
The editorial stance of the World News, compared to other Filipino Chinese newspapers, is pro-China, with Mallare seeking to distinguish the paper's coverage from the more pro-Taiwan coverage of both the local Chinese and mainstream media. In that regard, the newspaper was also the favored paper of pro-China organizations in the Philippines, such as the Filipino Chinese Amity Club under the Federation of Filipino Chinese Chambers of Commerce and Industry (FFCCCI).

In addition to its main Chinese-language edition, the World News also includes a free English-language digest called Tulay (橋; Qiáo; Kiô, lit. "bridge"), published by Kaisa para sa Kaunlaran, the organization behind the Bahay Tsinoy.
