= Chinese Congress on World Evangelization =

International organization of Overseas Chinese Christian churches

Chinese Coordination Centre of World Evangelization or CCCOWE (Chinese: 世界華人福音運動; pinyin: Shìjiè Huárén Fúyīn Yùndòng) is an international organization of Overseas Chinese Christian churches that was founded on 1976. CCCOWE has branches throughout East Asia and Southeast Asia. It is a member of the Lausanne Committee, a Christian organization that aims to bring the Gospel into the whole world. Its headquarter is in Hong Kong and the current general secretary is Rev. Dr. David Doong.

== History ==
The CCCOWE was a movement established at the First International Congress on World Evangelization in 1974. Before the official start of the 1974 conference meeting, a group of 70 pastors was praying for the Chinese churches worldwide and was "inspired by the Holy Spirit to commence the movement." In August 1976, the First Chinese Congress on World Evangelization was convened in Hong Kong.

Since its inception in 1976, CCCOWE (Chinese Coordination Centre of World Evangelization; Chinese:世界華人福音事工聯絡中心; Acronym: 世界華福中心), the centre has been serving the movement and facilitating pertinent ministries.

Its goal is to reach out to the Chinese and Overseas Chinese throughout the world. However, some people have seen that, lately, there are more and more Overseas Chinese who do not know how to speak or read Chinese. With this issue, a committee was formed to be able to address the issue. A new group was created to cater to the English speaking Overseas Chinese: the CCOWE English Task Force (ETC).

== Countries covered ==
- Argentina
- Australia
- Brazil
- Brunei
- Canada
- Costa Rica
- Chile
- China
- France
- Hong Kong
- Indonesia
- Ireland
- Italy
- Japan
- Korea
- Macau
- Malaysia
- Myanmar
- Netherlands
- New Zealand
- Panama
- Philippines
- Singapore
- Spain
- Taiwan
- Thailand
- U.K.
- U.S.A.

== Conferences ==
Conferences are held in countries or territories where there are Chinese Congress on World Evangelization offices - which are countries with sizeable ethnic Chinese populations.

- 1st Chinese Congress on World Evangelization (1976: Hong Kong)
- 2nd Chinese Congress on World Evangelization (1981: Singapore City, Singapore)
- 3rd Chinese Congress on World Evangelization (1986: Taipei, Taiwan)
- 4th Chinese Congress on World Evangelization (1991: Manila, Philippines)
- 5th Chinese Congress on World Evangelization (1996: Hong Kong)
- 6th Chinese Congress on World Evangelization (2001: Kuala Lumpur, Malaysia)
- 7th Chinese Congress on World Evangelization (2006: Macau, China)
- 8th Chinese Congress on World Evangelization (2011: Bali, Indonesia)
- 9th Chinese Congress on World Evangelization (2016: New Taipei, Taiwan)
