= Friars in Spanish Philippines =

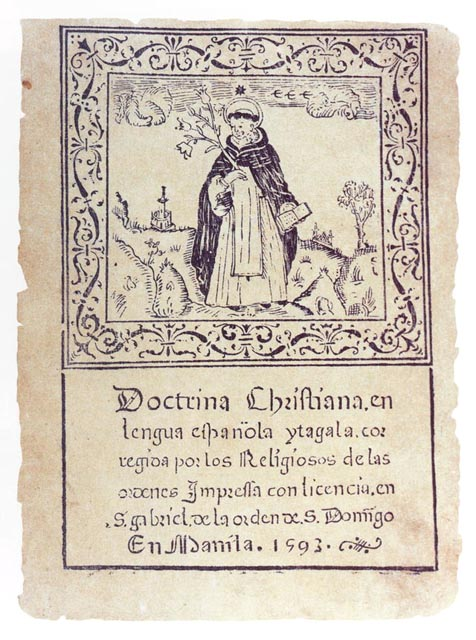
Doctrina Christiana, one of the earliest printed books in the Philippines for use by the Spanish friars in spreading Catholicism

The Spanish friars were the crucial elements in the Westernization of the Philippines, and in spreading the Christian faith in that part of the world. Though missionary endeavors played a key role in their project, the Spanish Friars were merely one arm of a broader Spanish colonial endeavor. Journeying with the first European explorers to these islands in East Asia, then the Far East, they came with the intention of establishing Catholicism under the Patronato real of the kings of Spain.

After the conquistadores brought the Filipinos under the rule of the Spanish crown, either by peaceful means of treaties and pacts or, alternatively, by war, Spain did send large standing armies to maintain its empire in the East. The apostolic zeal of the missionaries followed the efforts of men such as Miguel López de Legazpi, and aided to consolidate the enterprise of Hispanicizing the Philippines. The Spanish missionaries acted as de facto conquerors; they gained the goodwill of the islanders, presented Spanish culture positively, and in so doing won approximately 2 million converts.

Commenting on the very small standing army that protected the Spanish government in the Philippines, an old viceroy of New Spain was quoted: "En cada fraile tenía el Rey en Filipinas un capitan general y un ejercito entero (In each friar in the Philippines the King had a captain general and a whole army"). French historian Par J. Mallat made a similar observation. He stated: "C'est par la seule influence de la religion que l'on a conquis les Philippines, et cette influence pourra seule les conserver ("It is only by the influence of religion that the Philippines was conquered. Only this influence could keep these [islands]").

== Role of the friars in Hispanicized parts of the Philippines ==
Because of the scarcity of Spanish officials in the Philippines, most often the friar was the only Spaniard in a town. Aside from his religious activities, the friar also had authority in administration of the colony. He supervised the election of the gobernadorcillo and cabeza. He was the keeper of the list of residents of the town. His signature had to be seen on all financial papers of the town. The friars also served as mediators who quelled insurrections. It was because of the friar's spiritual function that people believed and feared him. He was also influential because of his knowledge of the native language and his ordinarily long stay in a town. Contemporary critics labeled this kind of system as "Frailocracy" or "Friarocracy".
