= List of Chinese schools in the Philippines =

This is a list of Chinese schools in the Philippines.

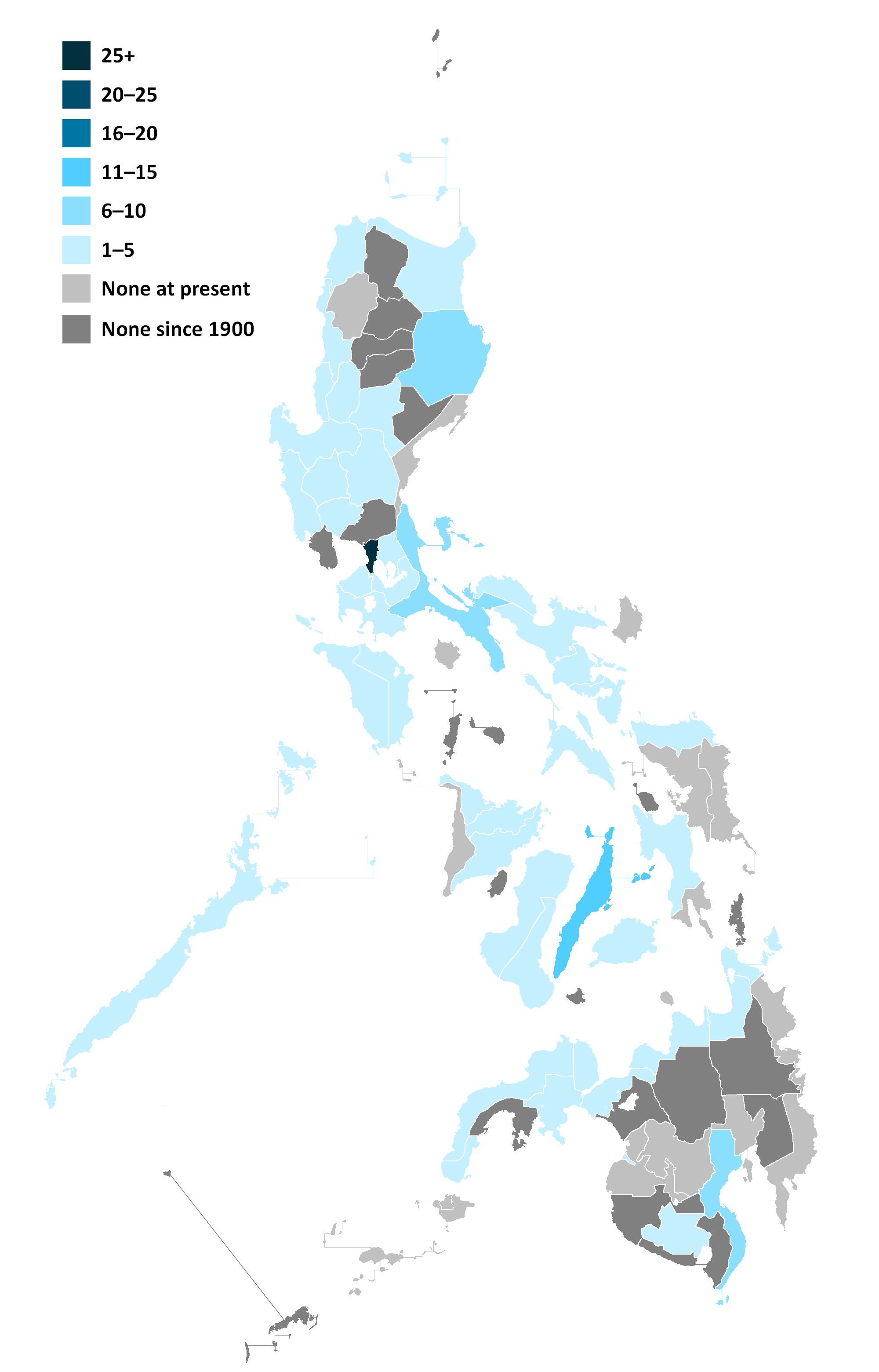
A map showing the number of Chinese schools in each Philippine province/area.

== List ==
Defunct

| Name | | Est. date | Location | | | | |
|---|---|---|---|---|---|---|---|
| Angeles Lip Lin School | 紅奚禮示立人學校 | January 6, 1923 | Angeles, Pampanga | | | | |
| Aparri Kete School | 阿巴里啓智中學 | January 6, 1923 | Aparri, Cagayan | | | | |
| Ateneo de Iloilo | 怡朗亞典耀聖母學校 | 1958 | Iloilo City, Iloilo | | | | |
| Ay Shin Academy | 愛心中學 | | Santa Cruz, Manila | | | | |
| Bacolod Tay Tung High School | 描戈律大同中學 | September 28, 1934 | Bacolod, Negros Occidental | | | | |
| Baguio Patriotic High School | 碧瑤愛國中學 | June 1918 | Baguio | | | | |
| Batangas Kipsi Memorial School | 描東岸市及時小學 | 1946 | Batangas City, Batangas | | | | |
| Bayanihan Institute | 丹轆省新民中學 | 1923 | Tarlac City, Tarlac | | | | |
| Bethany Christian School | 宿務毓德中學 | 1983 | Cebu City | | | | |
| Bohol Wisdom School | 武運智慧學校 | 1928-1930 | Tagbilaran, Bohol | | | | |
| Bulan Dr. Sun Yat Sen Memorial School | 任馬蘭社華英中學 | June 15, 1923 | Bulan, Sorsogon | | | | |
| Butuan Faith Christian School | 務端信心基督教學校 | 1988 | Butuan, Agusan del Norte | | | | |
| Cabanatuan Confucius School | 甲萬那端市中華小學 | July 1921 | Cabanatuan, Nueva Ecija | | | | |
| Calapan Chu Eng School | 加拉板聚英學校 | 1930 | Calapan, Oriental Mindoro | Gubat Sorsogon Sun Yat Sen School | 樹殊汶省吽叭鎮中山小学 | 1917 | Gubat, Sorsogon |
| CCF Life Academy | 興生學院 | 2014 | Pasig | | | | |
| Camarines Norte Chung Hua High School Foundation | 北甘馬仁省乃乙中華中學 | October 12, 1921 | Daet, Camarines Norte | | | | |
| Catholic Ming Yuan College | 天主教嗚遠大學 | 2012 | Murcia, Negros Occidental | | | | |
| Cebu Cherish School, Inc. | 宿務中華中學 | 1986 | Cebu City | | | | |
| Cebu Eastern College | 宿務東方學院 | September 1915 | Cebu City | | | | |
| Childlink Learning Center & High School | 宿務同心培幼學校 | 1996 | Cebu City | | | | |
| Chiang Kai Shek College | 菲律賓中正學院 | June 1939 | Tondo, Manila | | | | |
| Chinese International School Manila | 中華國際學校 | 2007 | Taguig | | | | |
| Colegio de San Ignacio | 納卯德榮學校 | 1995 | Davao City | | | | |
| Cotabato City Institute | 古島中華中學 | September 3, 1924 | Cotabato City | | | | |
| Davao Christian High School | 納卯基督教中學 | January 14, 1953 | Davao City | | | | |
| Davao Chong Hua High School (Davao Central High School) | 納卯中華中學 | June 3, 1924 | Davao City | | | | |
| Dee Hwa Liong Academy | 李華龍學院 | 2001 | Pasig | | | | |
| Dipolog Community School | 利保洛菲華學校 | December 14, 1939 | Dipolog, Zamboanga del Norte | | | | |
| Divine Mercy Learning Center | 群生育幼中心 | | Santa Cruz, Manila | | | | |
| Divine Word Academy of Dagupan | 德蘭中學 | 1957 | Dagupan, Pangasinan | | | | |
| Dr. Kwangson Young Memorial School | 光泩記念學校 | | Tondo, Manila | | | | |
| Dumaguete Chung Hua School | 東黑人省中山中學 | July 15, 1928 | Dumaguete, Negros Oriental | | | | |
| General Santos Hope Christian School | 南古島嘉南學校 | November 5, 1984 | General Santos | | | | |
| Gideon Academy | 基中書院 | 1984 | Pasay | | | | |
| Grace Christian College | 菲律賓基督教靈惠學院 | July 5, 1950 | Quezon City | | | | |
| Holy Cross High School | 朗嗎倪地中國中學 | July 15, 1925 | Dumaguete, Negros Oriental | | | | |
| Hope Christian High School | 嘉南中學 | November 29, 1946 | Santa Cruz, Manila | | | | |
| Hua Siong College of Iloilo | 怡朗華商學院 | February 25, 1912 | Iloilo City, Iloilo | | | | |
| Ilagan Chung Hua Institute | 依拉岸中華學校 | 1946 | Ilagan, Isabela | | | | |
| Iloilo Scholastic Academy | 怡朗新華學院 | April 2004 | Iloilo City, Iloilo | | | | |
| Iloilo Sun Yat Sen High School | 怡朗中山中學 | November 12, 1925 | Iloilo City, Iloilo | | | | |
| Immaculate Conception Academy-Greenhills | 義德中學 | 1936 | San Juan | | | | |
| Jubilee Christian Academy | 基立學院 | February 1967 | Quezon City | | | | |
| Kalibo Sun Yat Sen School | 加里務中山學校 | July 1932 | Kalibo, Aklan | | | | |
| Kian Tiak Institute | 菲律賓丹轆建德學校 | 2000 | Tarlac City, Tarlac | | | | |
| Kinder Minds Learning Center | 榮慧培幼園 | 1995 | Quezon City | | | | |
| Kong Hua School | 東棉光華學校 | 1937 | Cagayan de Oro, Misamis Oriental | | | | |
| Koronadal Southern Elementary School | 高倫那達中華學校 | 1957 | Koronadal, South Cotabato | | | | |
| La Union Cultural Institute | 拉允隆文化書院 | September 18, 1931 | San Fernando, La Union | | | | |
| Laguna Santiago Educational Foundation | 內湖中華小學 | June 1927 | Santa Cruz, Laguna | | | | |
| Lanao Chung Hua School | 蘭佬中華中學 | November 12, 1938 | Iligan, Lanao del Norte | | | | |
| Legazpi Chong Hua Institute of Technology | 黎牙實備中華科技學校 | October 8, 1926 | Legazpi, Albay | | | | |
| Legazpi Hope Christian School | 黎牙實備嘉南學校 | 1979 | Legazpi, Albay | | | | |
| Leyte Progressive High School | 禮智興華中學 | September 27, 1921 | Tacloban, Leyte | | | | |
| Life Spring Christian School | 甘泉學院 | | Quezon City | | | | |
| L.I.G.H.T. Christian Academy | 義光基督學校 | June 2000 | Caloocan | | | | |
| Lorenzo Ruiz Academy | 聖軍中學 | 1946 | Manila | | | | |
| Lotus Children Learning Center | 慈蓮花幼學園 | | Santa Mesa, Manila | | | | |
| Makati Hope Christian School | 馬加智嘉南學校 | 1985 | Makati | | | | |
| Makati Hope Christian School Ortigas | 馬加智嘉南學校 Ortigas | 2024 | Mandaluyong | | | | |
| Manila Patriotic School | 馬尼刺愛國中學 | 1912 | Santa Cruz, Manila | | | | |
| Merry Angels School | 寶寶樂園學校 | | Santa Cruz, Manila | | | | |
| MGC-New Life Christian Academy | 新生佳音學院 | July 3, 1991 | Taguig | | | | |
| Misamis Union Educational Foundation, Inc. | 密三密斯光华中学 | 1936 | Ozamiz, Misamis Occidental | | | | |
| Mother Gonuy Memorial Institute | 慈母玉蕊紀念學校 | | Quezon City | | | | |
| Northern Negros Private School | 加禮示中山小學 | 1932 | Cadiz, Negros Occidental | | | | |
| Northern Rizal Yorklin School | 北黎剎育仁中學 | 1939 | Caloocan | | | | |
| Olongapo Anglo Cultural School, Inc. | 荷浪牙波中西小學 | 1937 | Olongapo, Zambales | | | | |
| Oro Christian Grace School | 鄢市恩惠學校 | September 1986 | Cagayan de Oro, Misamis Oriental | | | | |
| Ormoc Se San School | 旺木西山學校 | 1993 | Ormoc, Leyte | | | | |
| Pace Academy (and Philadelphia High School) | 培基中學 | 2002/1974 | Quezon City | | | | |
| Pagadian City Chamber School | 巴加連市商學校 | October 1, 1949 | Pagadian, Zamboanga del Sur | | | | |
| Paco Citizen Academy Foundation | 百閣公民學校 | June 1922 | Paco, Manila | | | | |
| Pangasinan Universal Institute | 蜂省大同中學 | November 12, 1920 | Dagupan, Pangasinan | | | | |
| Pasig Community School | 菲律賓巴石華橋學校 | | Pasig | | | | |
| Pasig Community School | 巴石華僑學校 | 1954 | Pasig | | | | |
| Philippine Academy of Sakya | 菲律賓佛教能仁中學 | 1960 | Santa Cruz, Manila | | | | |
| Philippine Academy of Sakya Davao, Inc. | 菲律賓納卯佛教龍華學校 | 1994 | Davao City | | | | |
| Philippine Buddhist Seng Guan Memorial Institute | 菲律賓乘願紀念學院 | 1970 | Malabon | | | | |
| Philippine Buddhacare Academy | 菲律賓佛教普濟學院 | September 19, 1997 | Quezon City | | | | |
| Philippine Chen Kuang High School | 菲律賓晨光中學 | 1950 | San Juan | | | | |
| Philippine Christian Gospel School | 宿務建基中學 | 1948 | Cebu City | | | | |
| Philippine Chung Hua School | 菲律濱中華中學 | | Manila | | | | |
| Philippine Cultural College | 菲律賓僑中學院 | June 27, 1923 | Tondo, Manila | | | | |
| Philippine Institute of Quezon City | 計順市菲華中學 | February 6, 1964 | Quezon City | | | | |
| Philippine Jin Nan Institute | 菲律濱洪門近南學校 | 1935 | Binondo, Manila | | | | |
| Philippine Malabon Cultural Institute | 菲律濱嗎拉汶文化書院 | 1958 | Malabon | | | | |
| Philippine Pasay Chung Hua Academy | 菲律賓巴西市中華書院 | November 24, 1932 | Pasay | | | | |
| Philippine San Bin School | 三民學校 | February 20, 1922 | San Nicolas, Manila | | | | |
| Philippine Scholastic Academy | 菲律賓崇文書院 | August 7, 1917 | Quiapo, Manila | | | | |
| Philippine Su Kuang Institute | 菲律賓曙光學校 | | Binondo, Manila | | | | |
| Philippine Sun Yat Sen High School | 菲律濱中山中學 | November 12, 1924 | Santa Cruz, Manila | | | | |
| Philippine Tong Ho Institute | 羅甲那同和中學 | February 14, 1921 | Lucena, Philippines | | | | |
| Philippine Yuh Chiau School | 毓僑中學 | 1946 | Cabatuan, Isabela | | | | |
| Philadelphia High School (now under Pace Academy) | 尚愛中學 | 1974 | Quezon City | | | | |
| Quezon City Christian Academy | 計順市基督學院 | 1991 | Quezon City | | | | |
| Rinconada Allied Cultural School Foundation, Inc. | 南甘馬仁省依里牙市聯盟小學 | 1938 | Iriga, Camarines Sur | | | | |
| Sacred Heart School | 禮智萬市鳴遠學院 | 1958 | Tacloban, Leyte | | | | |
| Sacred Heart School - Hijas de Jesús | 聖心學校－耶穌孝女會 | June 1, 1957 | Cebu City | | | | |
| Sacred Heart School – Ateneo de Cebu | 宿霧雅典耀聖心學校 | 1955 | Mandaue City, Cebu | | | | |
| Saint Gabriel International School | 國際學校 | 2000 | Pasig | | | | |
| Saint Jude Catholic School | 天主教崇德學校 | July 1963 | San Miguel, Manila | | | | |
| Saint Joseph School | 三寶顏忠義中學 | 1965 | Zamboanga City | | | | |
| Saint Stephen's High School | 聖公會中學 | July 22, 1917 | Santa Cruz, Manila | | | | |
| Saint Therese Catholic School | 清錦中學 | April 2007 | Noveleta, Cavite | | | | |
| Samantabhadra Educational Institute Inc. | 普賢中學 | 1954 | Cebu City | | | | |
| Samantabhadra Institute | 普賢中學 | 1947 | Manila | | | | |
| San Pablo Chung Hua School | 仙答洛中華學校 | June 1915 | San Pablo, Laguna | | | | |
| Santiago Cultural Institute | 怡省仙朝峨中華中學 | 1948 | Santiago, Isabela | | | | |
| Sorsogon Chiang Kai Shek School | 樹殊銀中正小學 | June 1927 | Sorsogon City, Sorsogon | | | | |
| St. Didacus Institute | 菲律濱計順省寓嗎加中華小學 | February 14, 1952 | Gumaca, Quezon | | | | |
| St. John's Institute | 描戈律華明中學 | 1953 | Bacolod, Negros Occidental | | | | |
| St. Joseph School | 耀華中學 | March 1, 1960 | Naga, Camarines Sur | | | | |
| St. Peter the Apostle School | 天主教培德中學 | February 1976 | Paco, Manila | | | | |
| St. Santiago School Foundation, Inc. | 北怡羅戈省華英小學 | June 1925 | Laoag, Ilocos Norte | | | | |
| Stella Maris Academy of Davao | 納卯海星學校 | 1953 | Davao City | | | | |
| Sulu Tong Jin School | 蘇洛當仁學校 | October 10, 1920 | Jolo, Sulu | | | | |
| Surigao Sun Yat Sen Elementary School | 樹裏爻孫逸仙小學 | 1928 | Surigao City, Surigao del Norte | | | | |
| Tabaco Pei Ching High School | 淡描戈培青中學 | November 12, 1920 | Tabaco, Albay | | | | |
| Tarlac Living Faith Academy | 丹轆信心學院 | June 1995 | Tarlac City, Tarlac | | | | |
| Timber City Academy | 亞虞山培青中學 | 1947 | Butuan, Agusan del Norte | | | | |
| Tiong Se Academy | 中西學院 | April 15, 1899 | Binondo, Manila | | | | |
| Trinity Christian School | 描戈律基督教三一學校 | 1976 | Bacolod, Negros Occidental | | | | |
| Uno High School | 尚一中學 | June 1960 | Tondo, Manila | | | | |
| United Evangelical Church School | 内湖中華基督教會 | January 1992 | Santa Cruz, Laguna | | | | |
| Vigan Nan Chong School | 美岸南中學校 | February 24, 1928 | Vigan, Ilocos Sur | | | | |
| Vineyard Christian Academy | 葡萄園基督學院 | 1996 | San Fernando City, La Union | | | | |
| Westminster High School | 培元中學 | 1935 | Tondo, Manila | | | | |
| Wisdom Light Christian Academy | 慧光基督學院 | 2001 | Quezon City | | | | |
| Xavier School | 光啓學校 | June 6, 1956 | San Juan | | | | |
| Young Children Learning Center | 三乖乖幼兒園 | | Quezon City | | | | |
| Zamboanga Avalokitesvara School | 三寶顏福泉寺觀音學校 | 1968 | Zamboanga City | | | | |
| Zamboanga Chong Hua High School | 三寶顏中華中學 | November 12, 1919 | Zamboanga City | | | | |

== Gallery ==
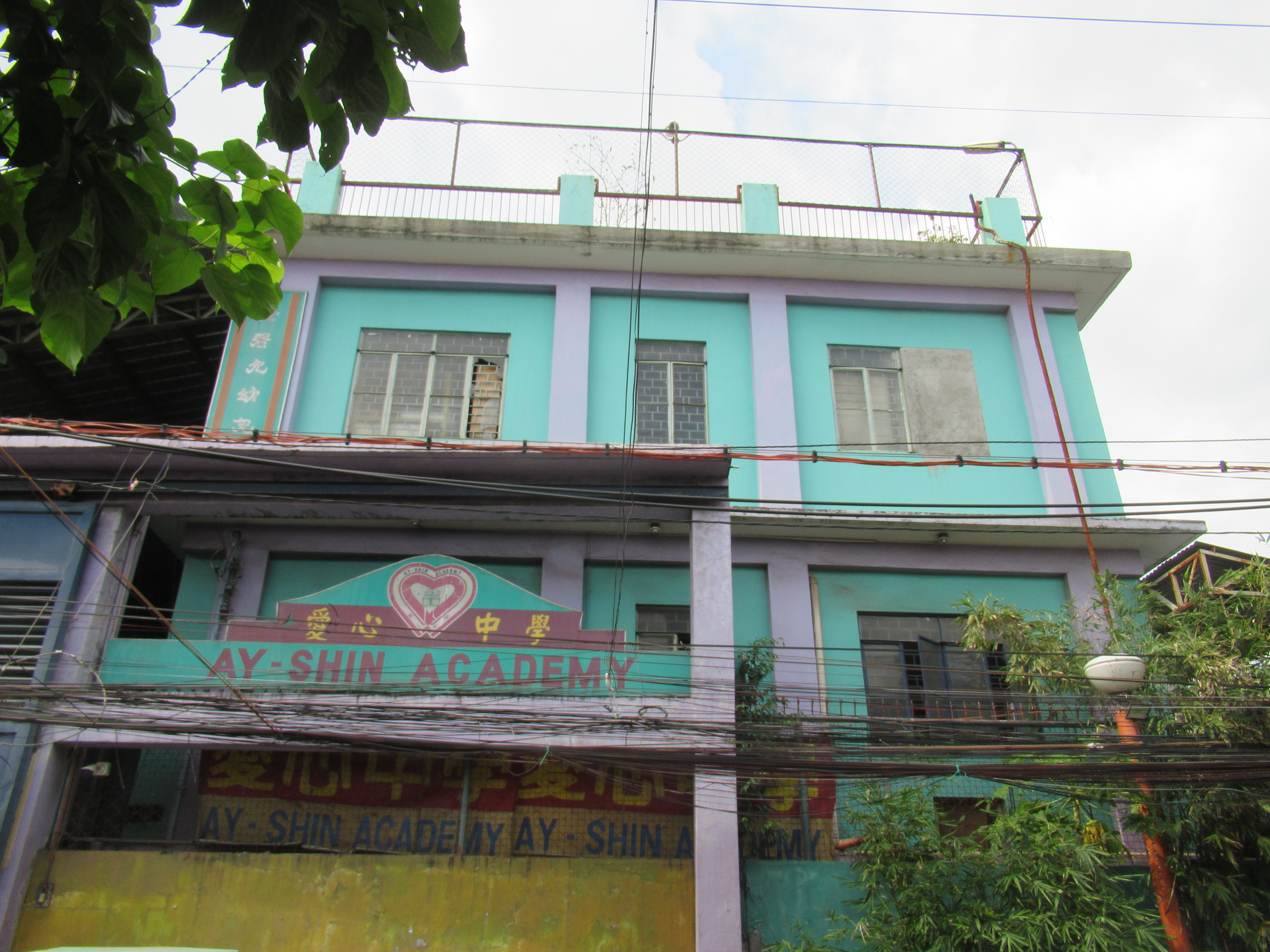
Ay Shin Academy, Tondo

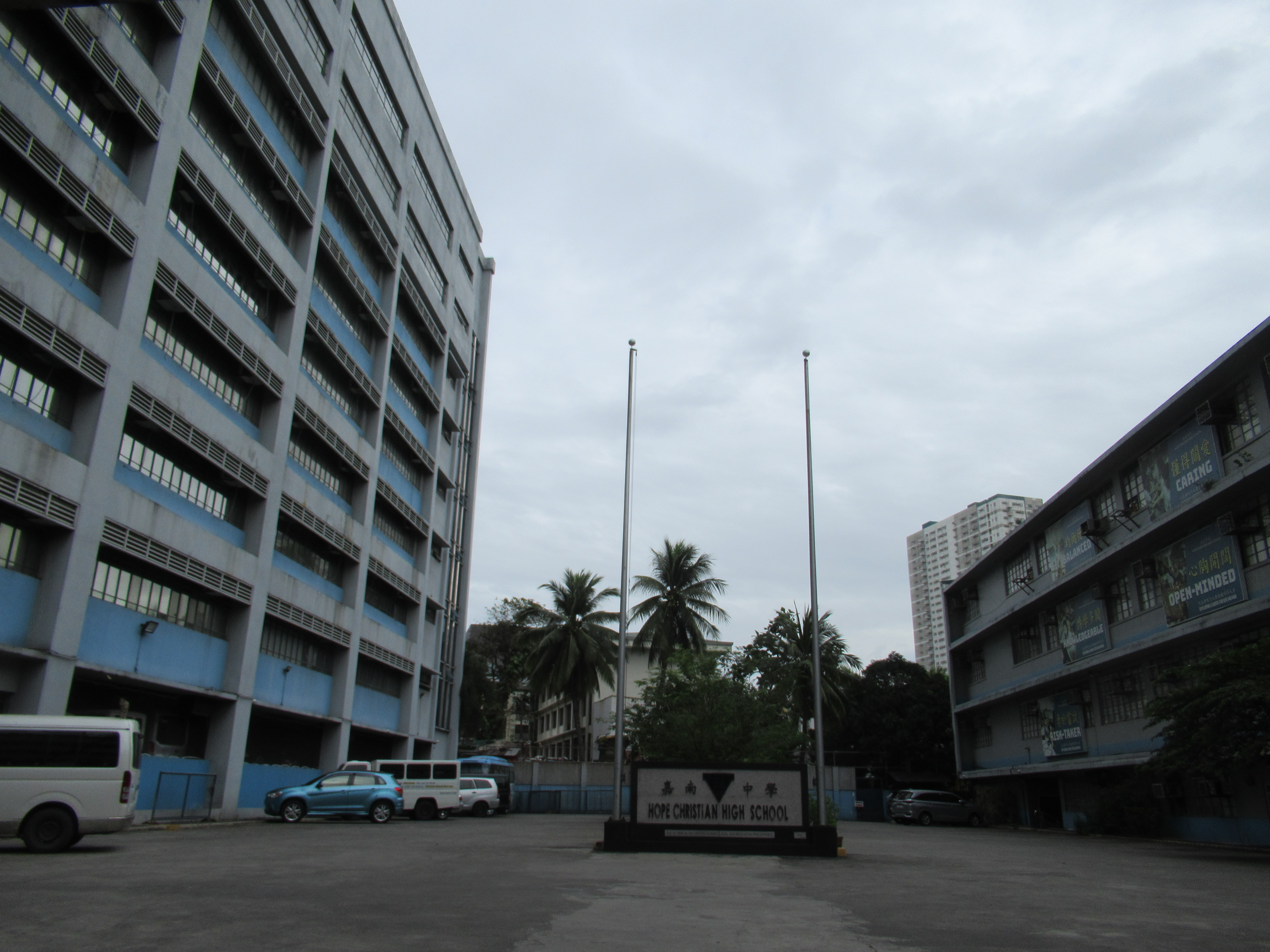
Hope Christian High School

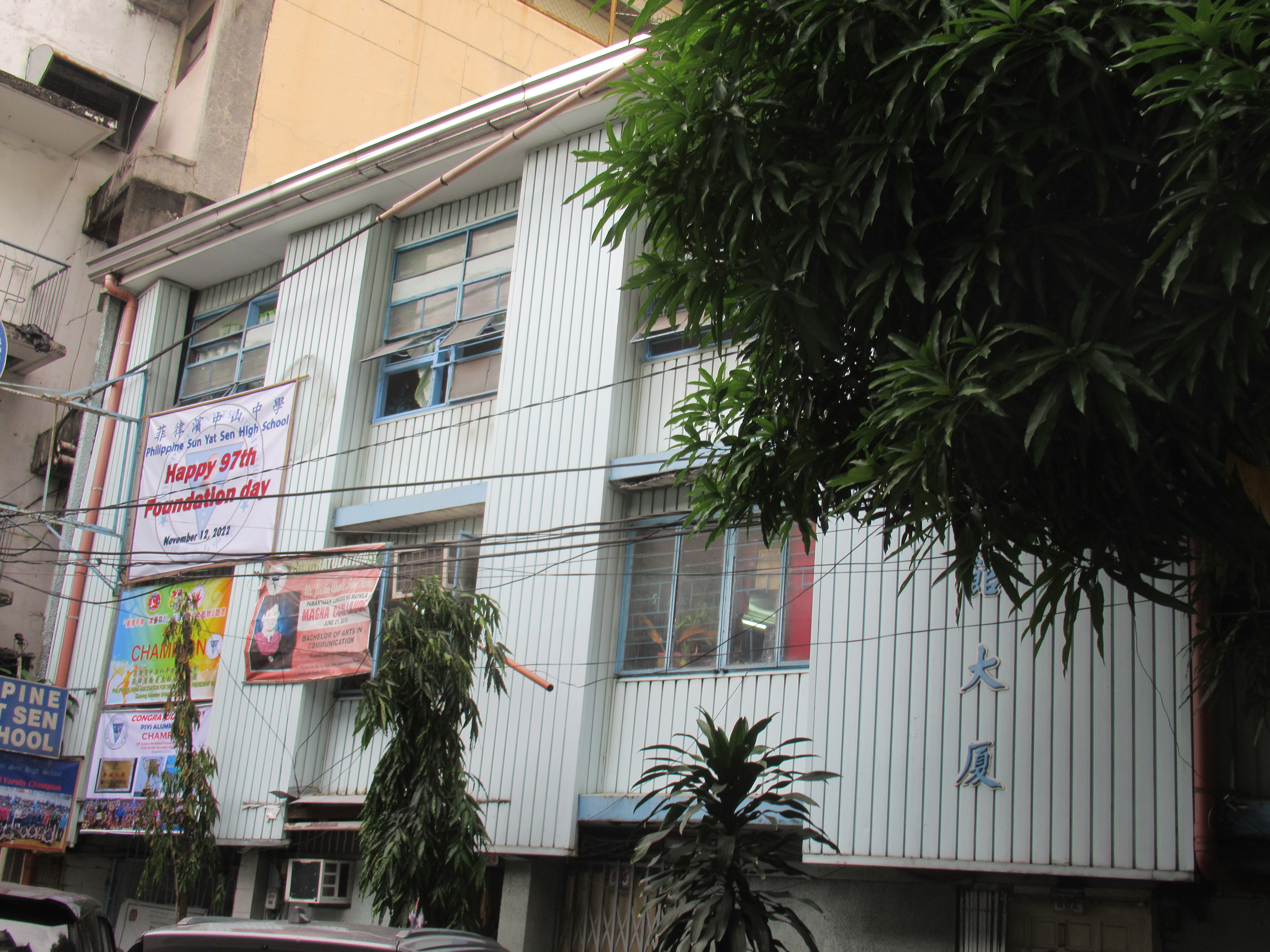
Philippine Sun Yat Sen High School

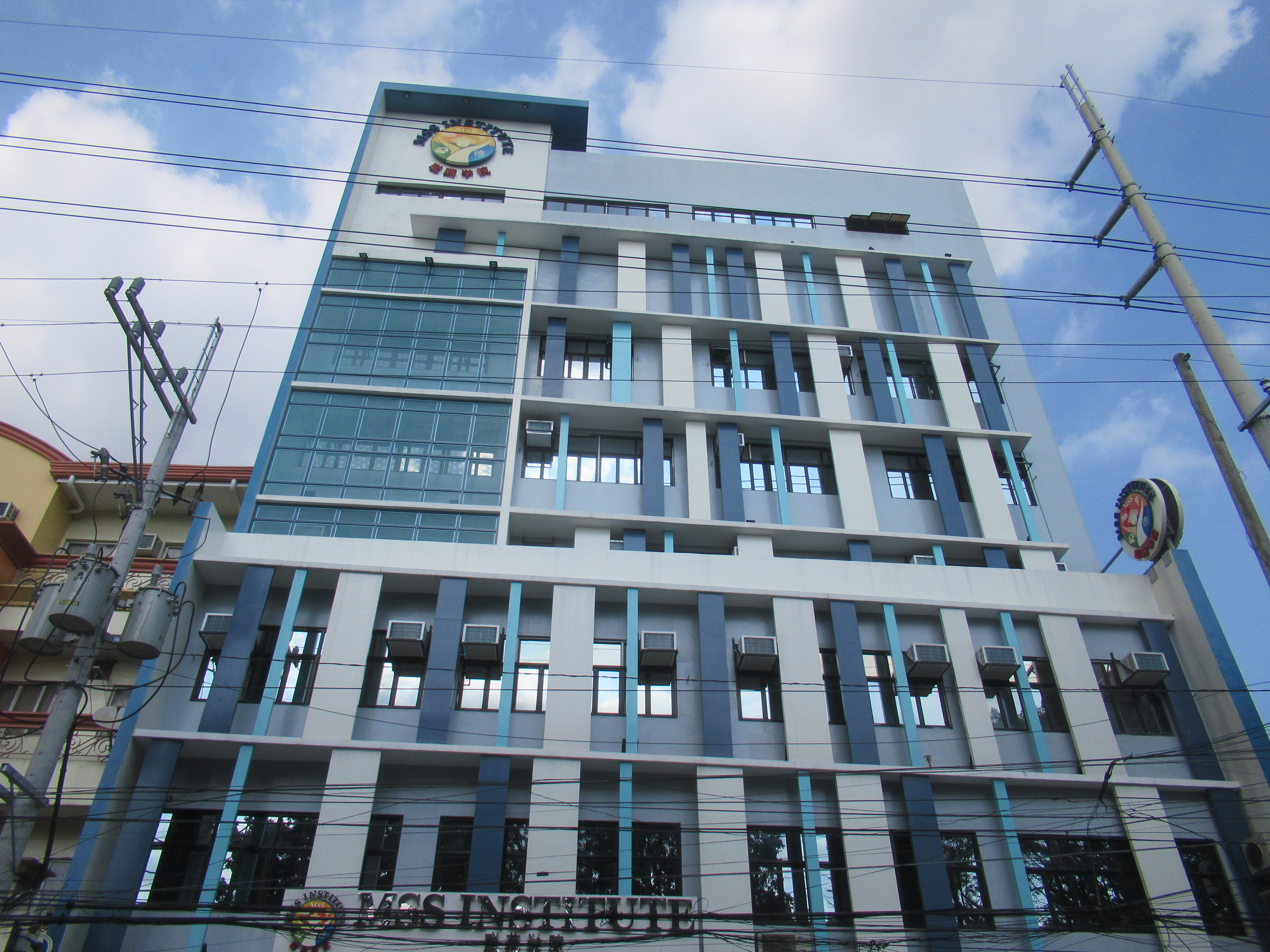
Mind Specialists School

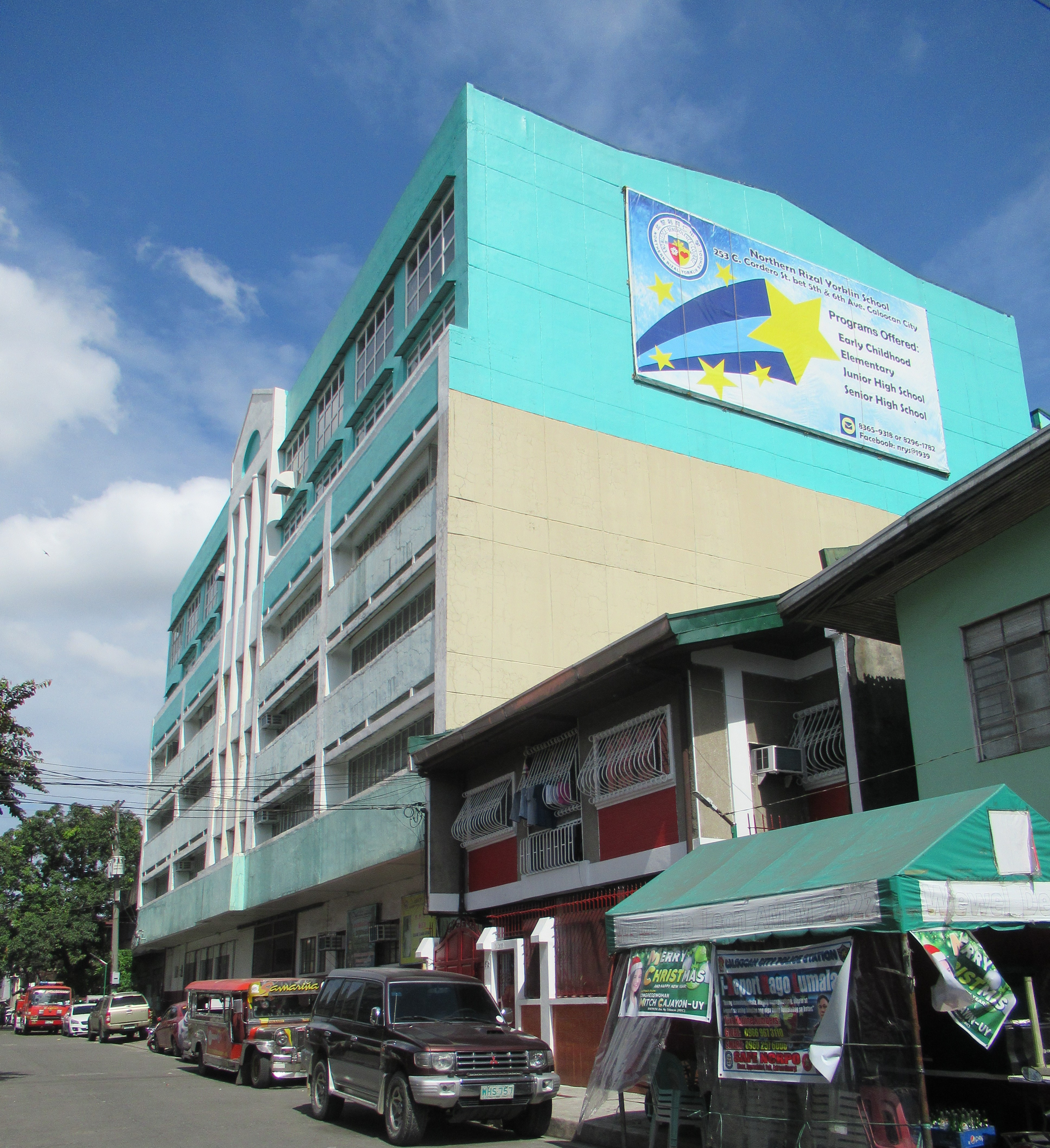
Northern Rizal Yorklin School 北黎刹育仁中学

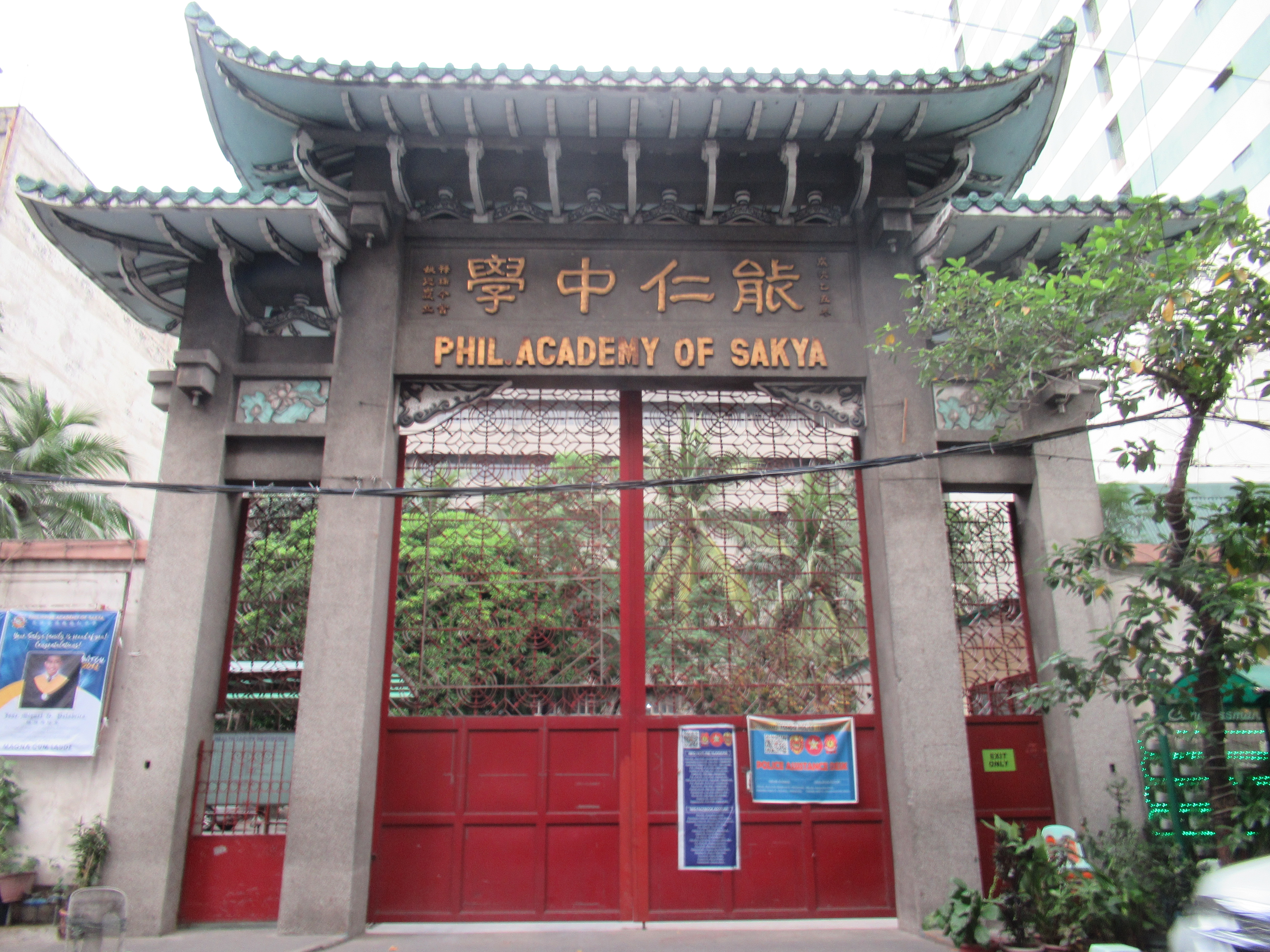
Philippine Academy of Sakya 菲律宾佛教能仁中学

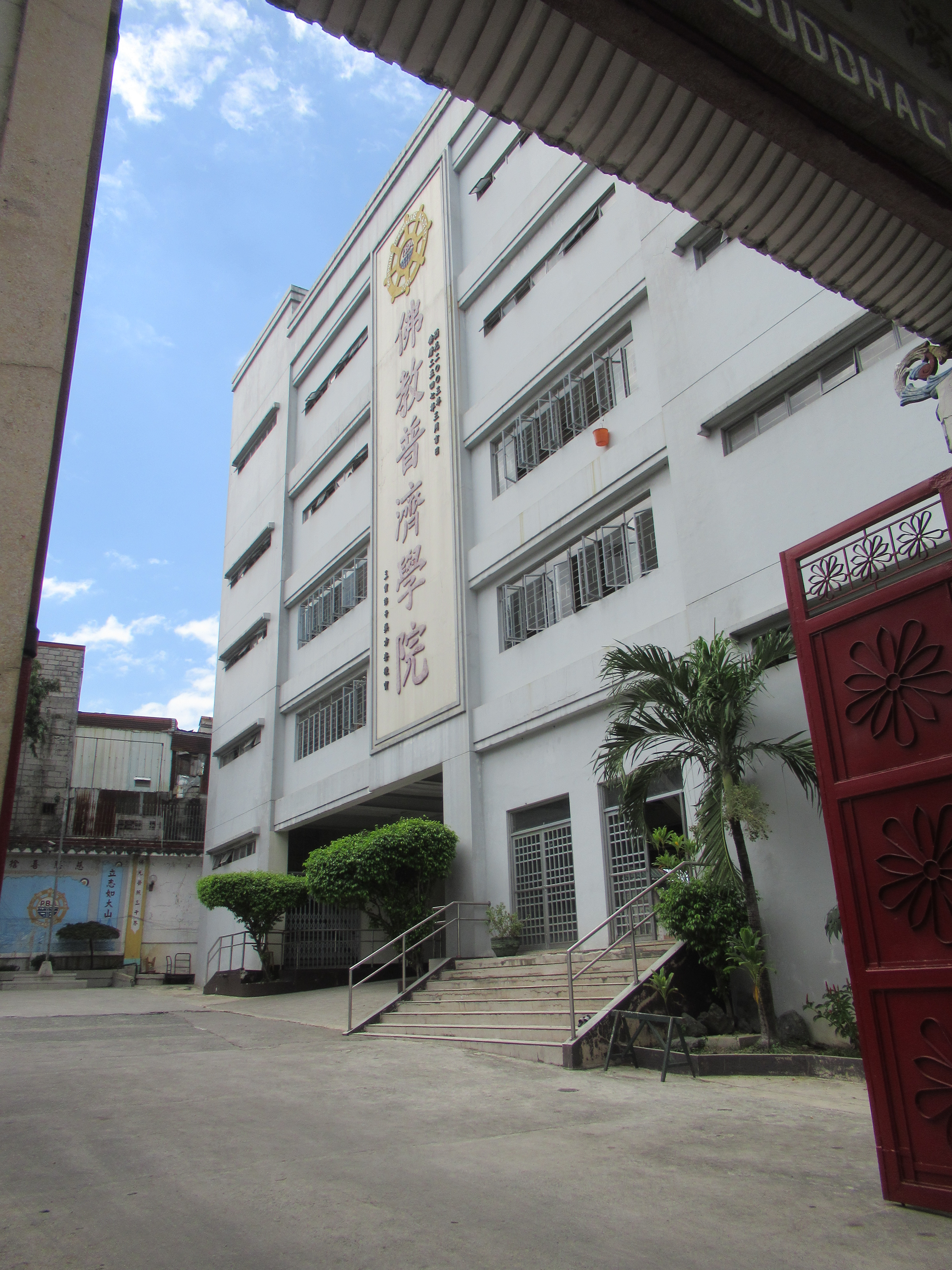
Philippine Buddhacare Academy

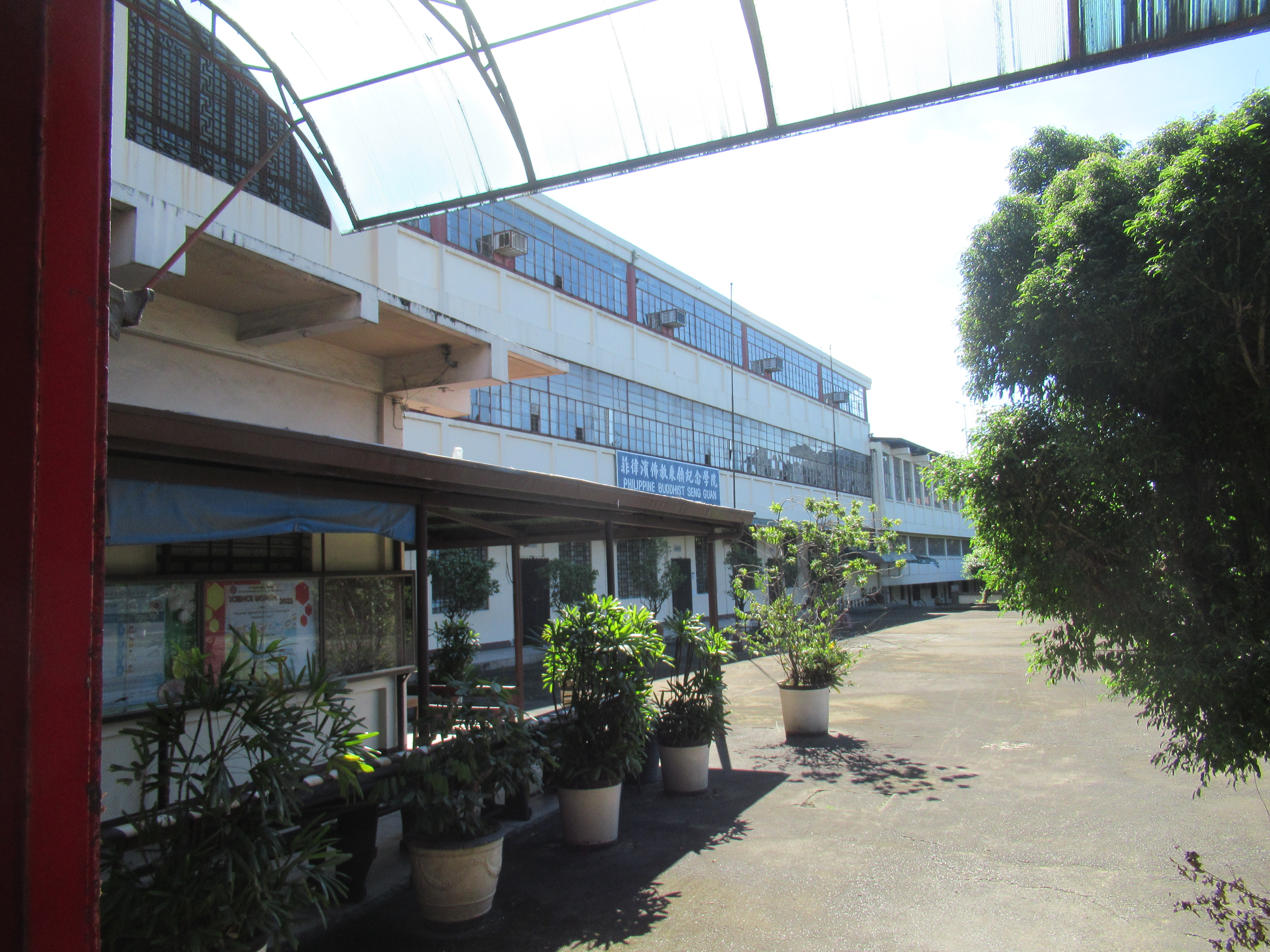
Philippine Buddhist Seng Guan Memorial Institute

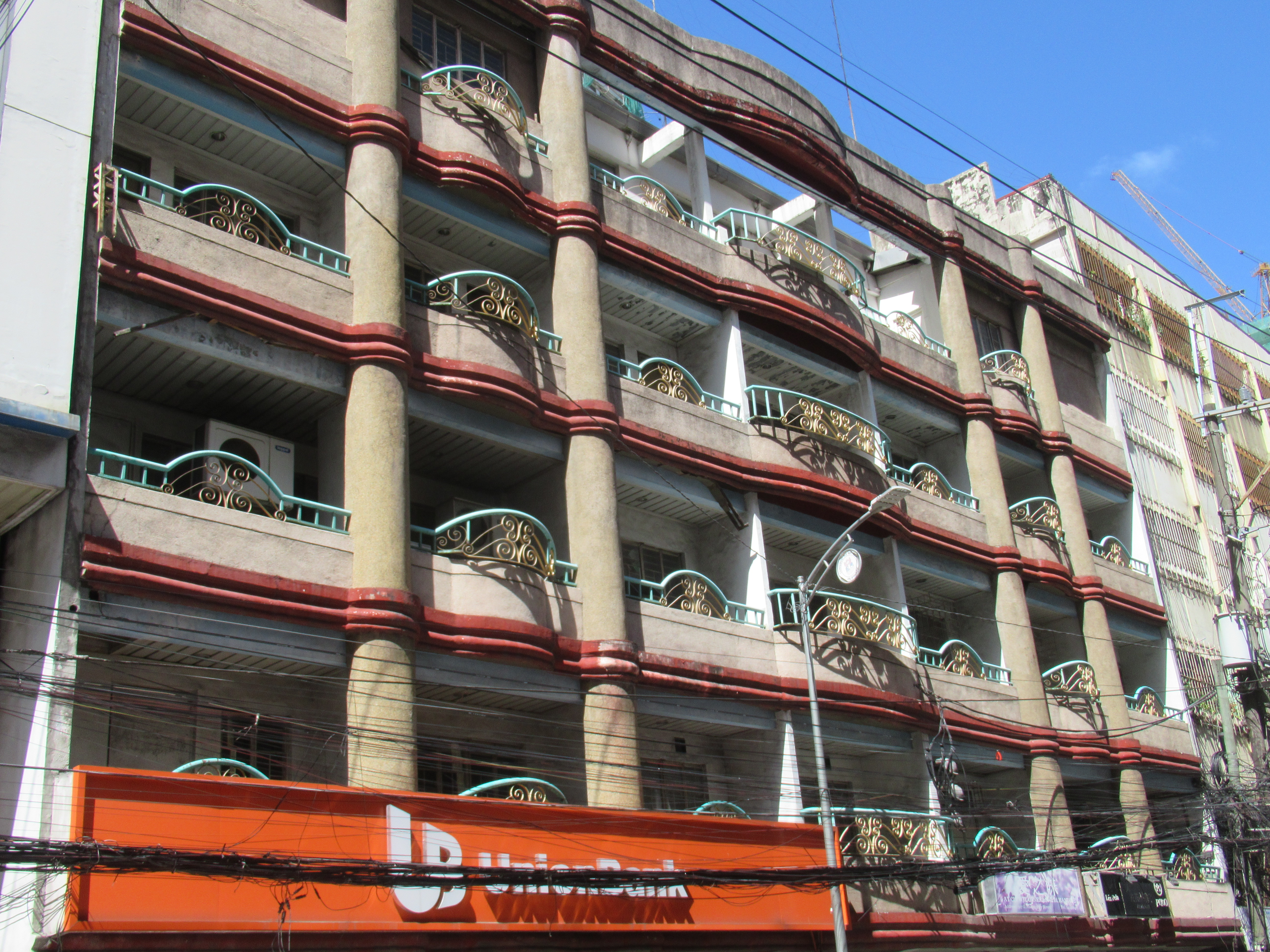
Philippine Chin Hwa Academy

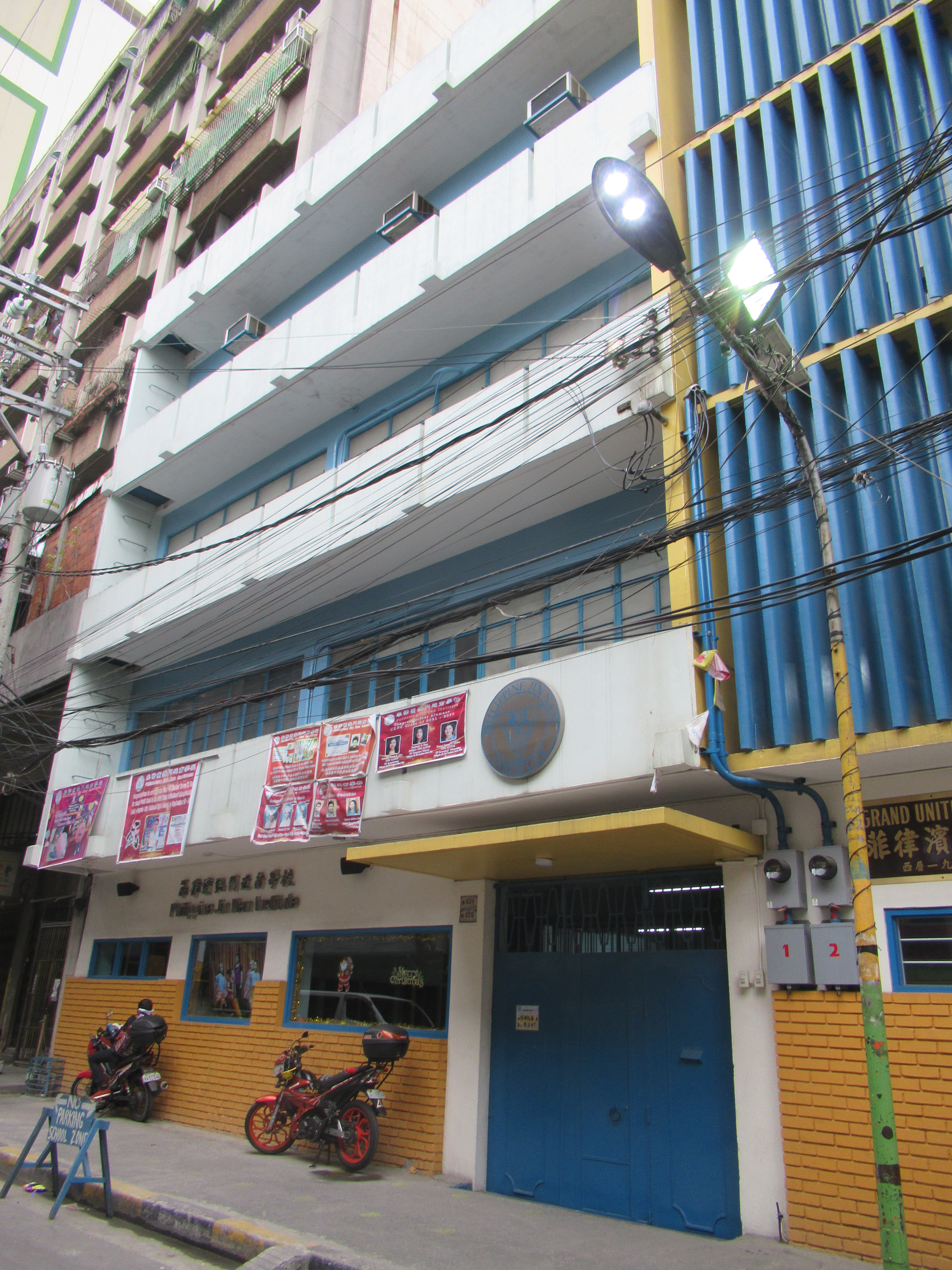
Philippine Jin Nan Institute

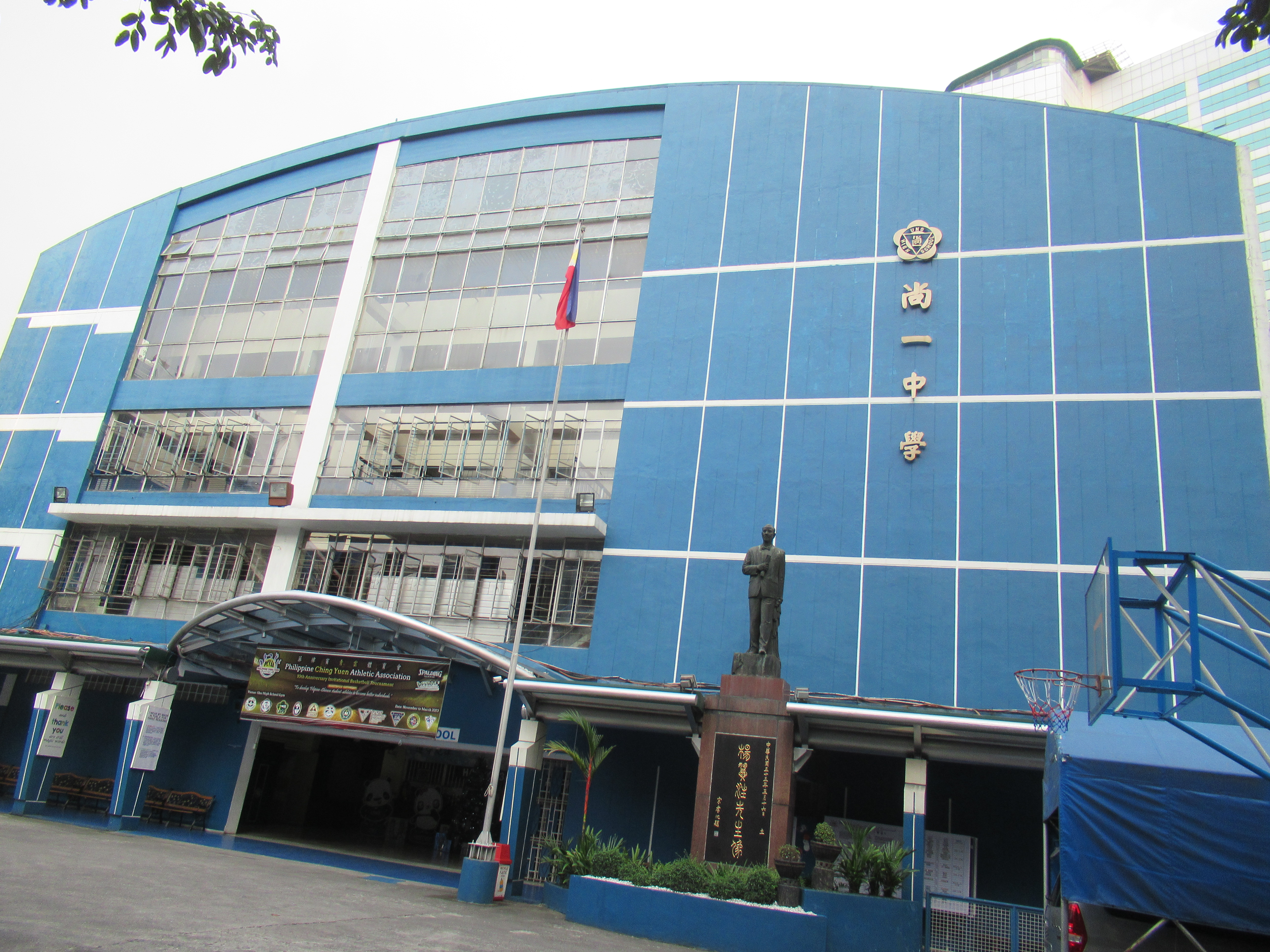
Uno High School

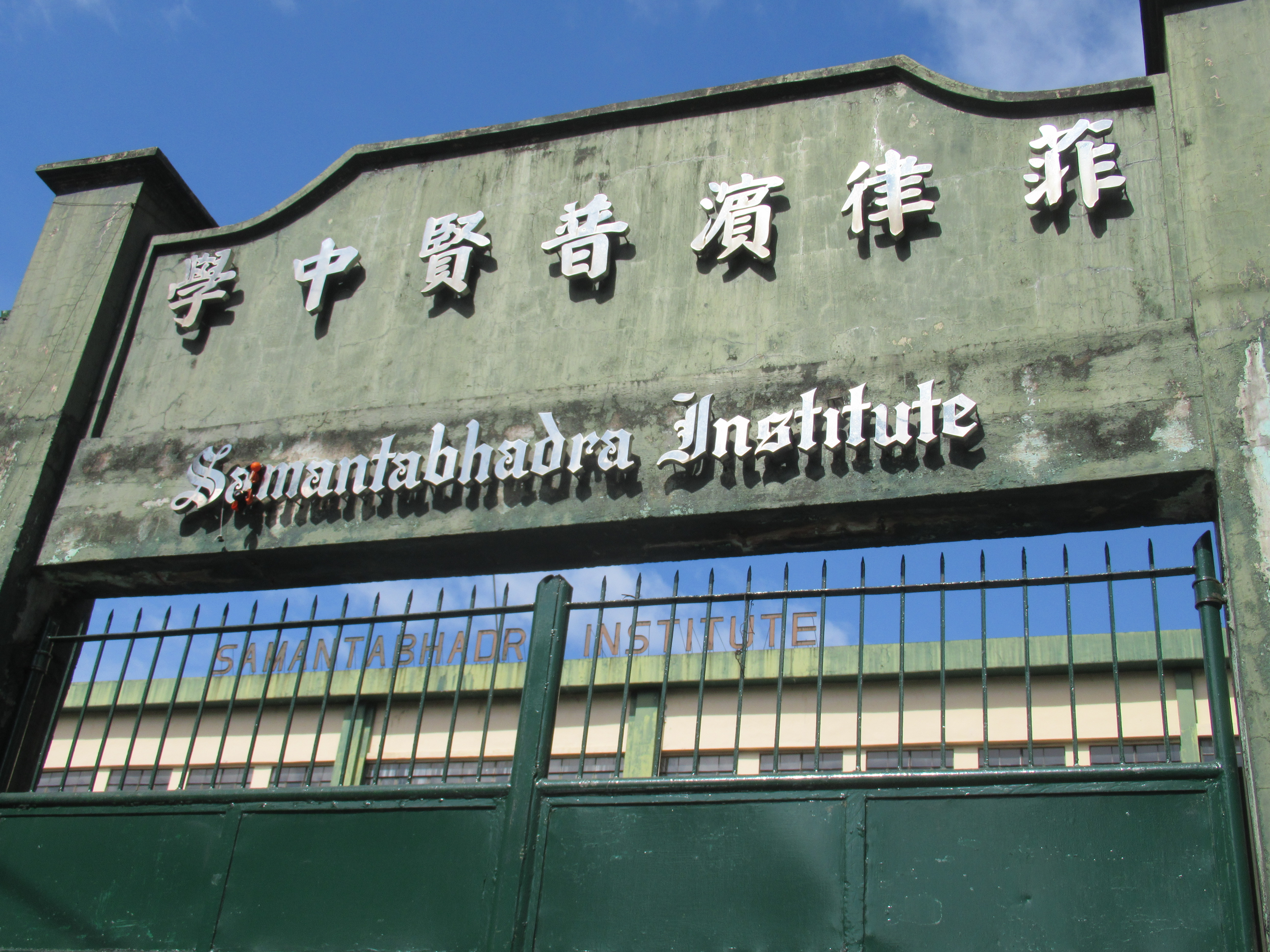
Samantabhadra Institute (Puo Yian) 普贤中学 (普賢中學)

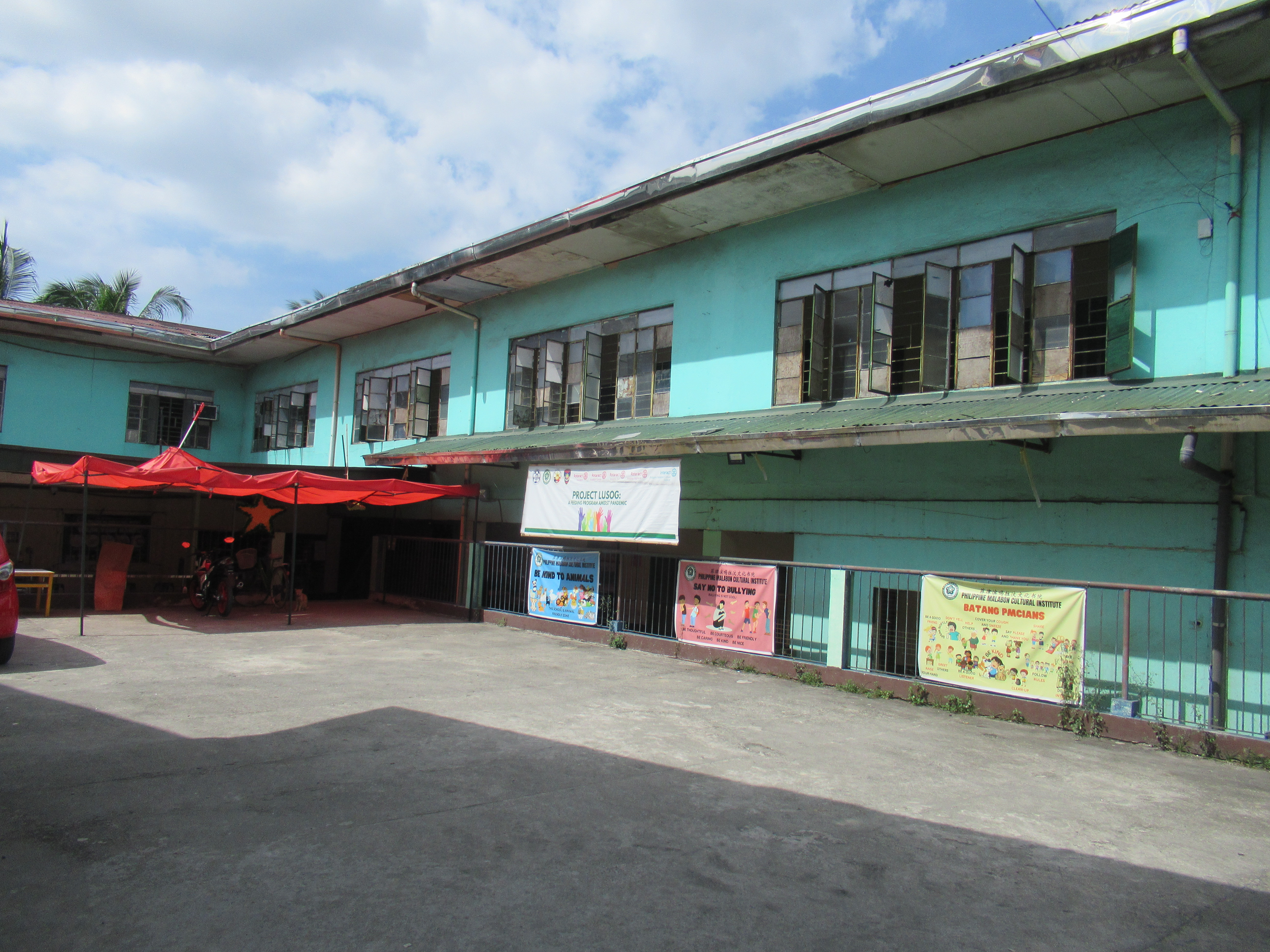
Philippine Malabon Cultural Institute

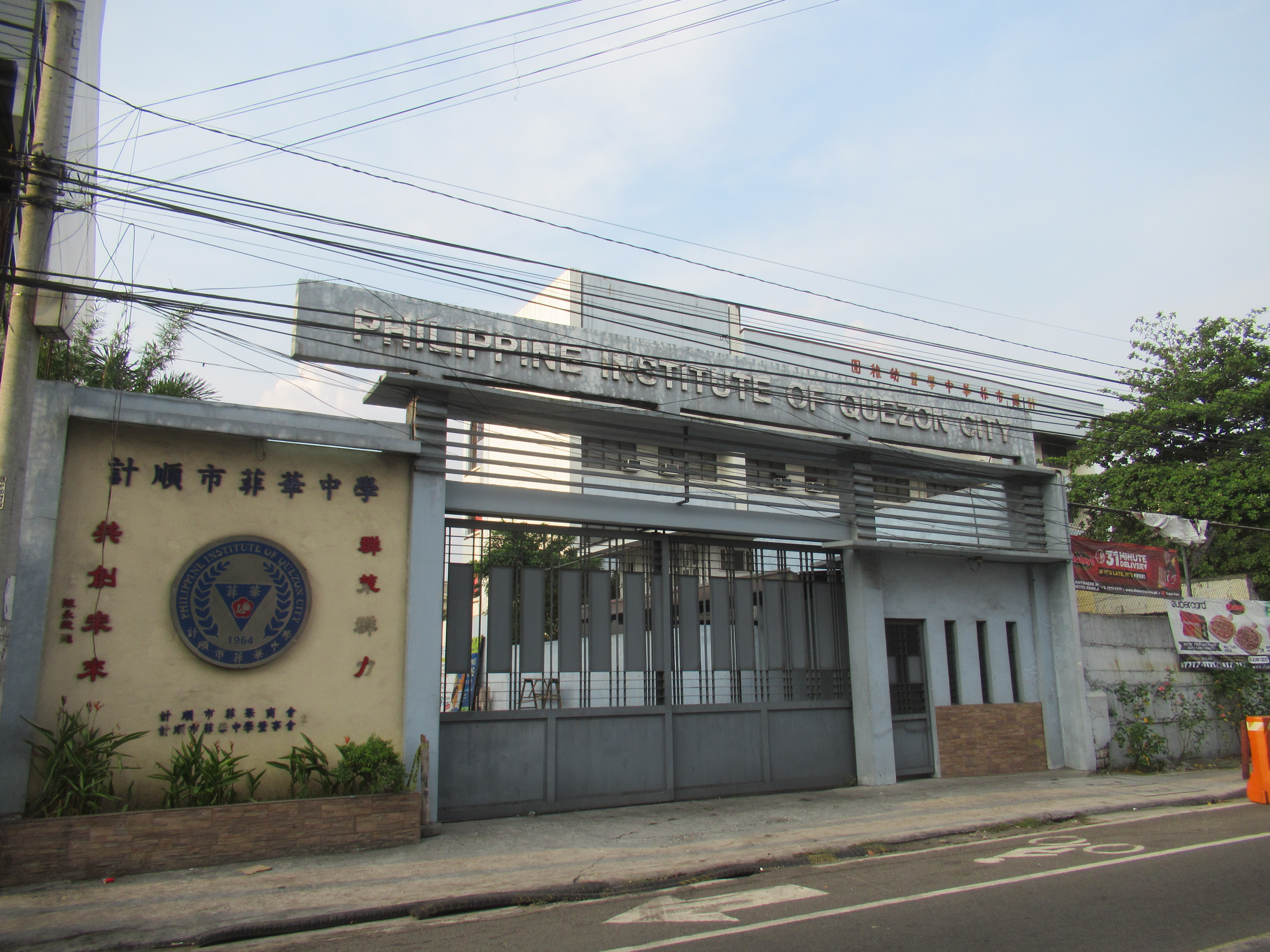
Philippine Institute of Quezon City 計順市菲華中學

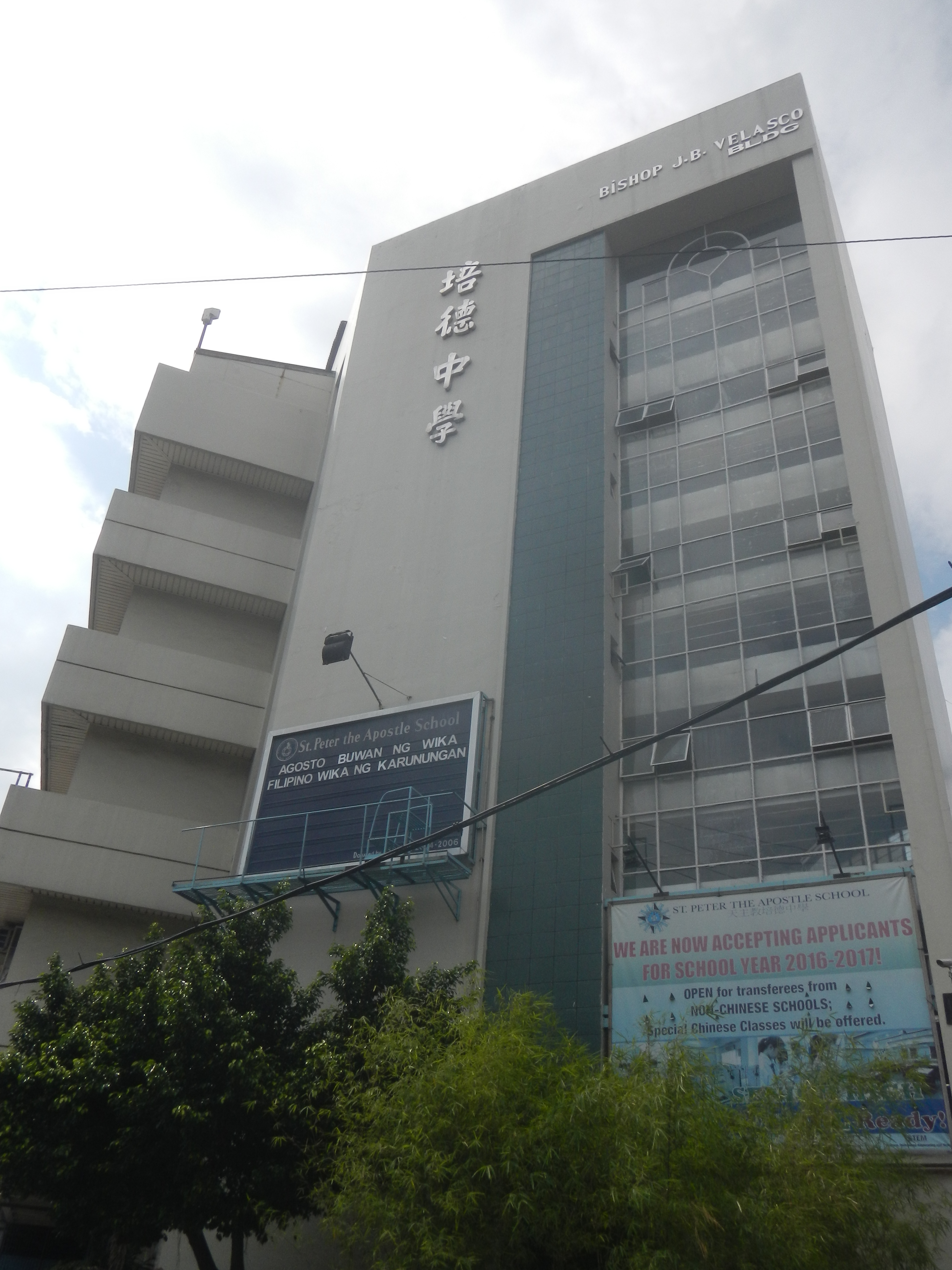
St. Peter the Apostle School (Paco, Manila)

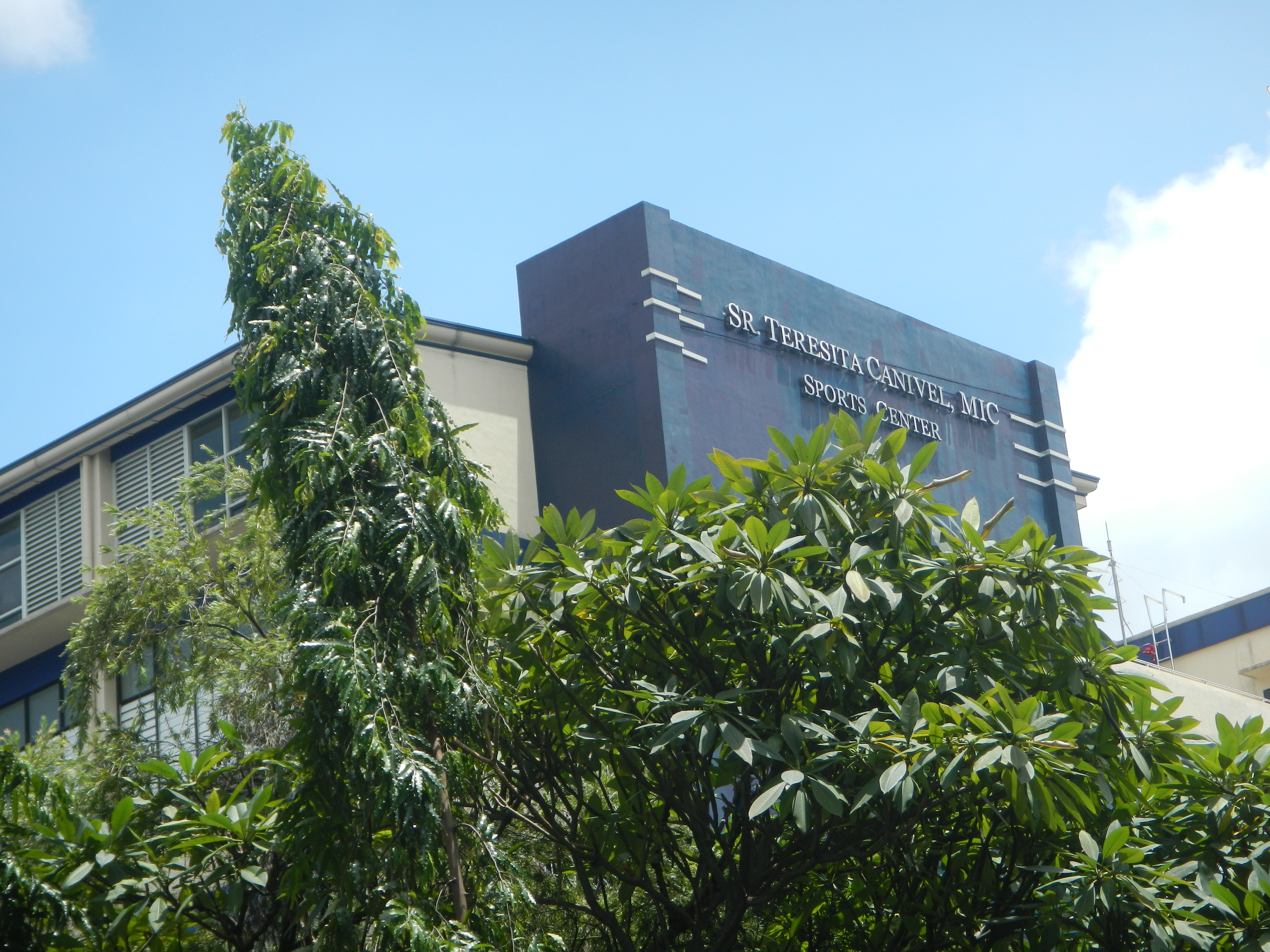
Immaculate Conception Academy-Greenhills

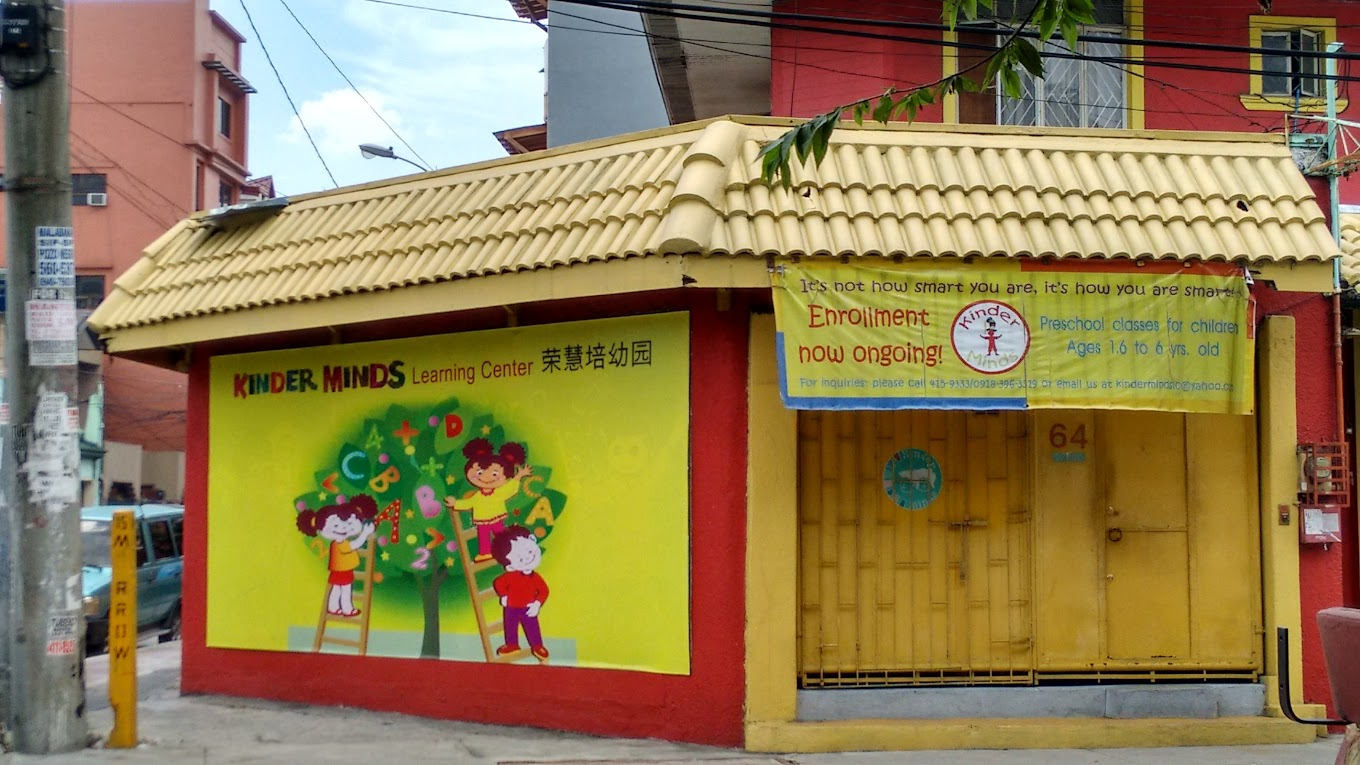
Kinder Minds Learning Center
