= PTSA =

PTSA may refer to:

- Kosrae International Airport, an airport serving Kosrae, the easternmost state of the Federated States of Micronesia by ICAO code
- p-Toluenesulfonic acid
- Parent-Teacher-Student Association
- Philippine Tiong Se Academy, the oldest Chinese school in the Philippines. (est. 1899)
