= 1990 UST Glowing Goldies basketball team =

1990 UST Growling Tigers men's basketball

Record
- Elims rank: #T–4
- Final rank: #T–4
- 1990 record: 8–6
- Head coach: Aric del Rosario (4th season)
- Assistant coaches: Mady Tabora
- Captain: Billy Reyes (2nd season)

The 1990 UST Glowing Goldies men's basketball team represented University of Santo Tomas in the 53rd season of the University Athletic Association of the Philippines. The men's basketball tournament for the school year 1990–91 began on July 28, 1990, and the host school for the season was the University of the East.

The Goldies who had undergone a rebuilding phase in the summer won eight games against six losses for a tie with the FEU Tamaraws at fourth place in the standings at the end of the double round-robin eliminations. They led the league with an immaculate 8–0 record before crashing out with a six-game losing streak at the end of the season.

== Roster ==
UST Glowing Goldies roster
Players
Coaches

Pos.	No.	Nat.	Name	Height	Year	High School
SG	8	(Philippines)	Patrick Roy Fran	6'0" (1.83m)	2nd	Aquinas School
SG	9	(Philippines)	Rudolf Belmonte	5'11" (1.8m)	2nd	San Beda College
PG	10	(Philippines)	Beltran Reyes (C)	5'10" (1.78m)	3rd	Ateneo de Manila
C	11	(Philippines)	Edward Joseph Feihl	7'0" (2.13m)	1st	University of Santo Tomas
PG	14	(Philippines)	Bethune Tanquingcen	5'9" (1.75m)	1st	Philippine Cultural High School
PF	16	(Philippines)	Dennis Espino	6'6" (1.98m)	1st	Holy Angel University
SF	17	(Philippines)	Generoso Tengco, Jr.	6'0" (1.83m)	2nd	University of Santo Tomas
PG	18	(Philippines)	Vincent Kenneth Favis	5'11" (1.8m)	2nd	La Salle Greenhills
SG		(Philippines)	James Sichon	5'10" (1.78m)	3rd	University of St. La Salle
PF		(Philippines)	Joaquin Dindo Torres	6'4" (1.93m)	2nd	University of Santo Tomas
PF		(Philippines)	Renato Cabaluna	6'3" (1.91m)	2nd	University of Santo Tomas
C		(Philippines)	Peter Tioseco	6'7" (2.01m)	1st	Lourdes School of Mandaluyong
C		(Philippines)	Benjie Bendillo	–	–	–
SF		(Philippines)	A. Miranda	–	–	–

Head coach

- (Philippines) Januario del Rosario

Assistant coach(es)

- Amadito Tabora

Legend

- (C) Team captain
- Injured

=== Depth chart ===
Pos.	Starting 5	Bench 1	Bench 2
C	Feihl	Bendillo	Tioseco
PF	Torres	Espino
SF	Tengco	Miranda
SG	Sichon	Belmonte	Fran
PG	Reyes	Favis	Tanquingcen

== Roster changes ==
The Goldies welcomed Aric del Rosario back into the team as their head coach after going through three coaching changes in the past two years.

Eight players that include seniors Ricarte Salvador, Digs Latoreno and team captain Alfrancis Chua have departed the team and are replaced by Binky Favis, who had transferred from La Salle, returning players Jimmy Sichon and Udoy Belmonte, and three towering rookies led by the 7-foot tall former UST Nuggets team captain EJ Feihl.

=== Subtractions ===
Pos.	No.	Nat.	Player	Height	Year	High school	Notes
PF	5	(Philippines)	Edmund Reyes	6' 3"	2nd	Good Shepherd Academy	Academic deficiencies
PG	9	(Philippines)	Alfrancis Chua	5' 11"	5th	Colegio de San Juan de Letran	Graduated
PF	17	(Philippines)	Rodrigo Latoreno	6' 2"	5th		Graduated
		(Philippines)	Ricarte Salvador	6' 1"	5th		Graduated
		(Philippines)	Arturo Manuel Teruel, Jr.		2nd	Bacolod Tay Tung High School	Academic deficiencies
		(Philippines)	Juan Augusto Ramirez	6' 3"	2nd	San Beda College	Transferred to the Polytechnic University of the Philippines
		(United States)	Marcelino Casal		2nd	John Burroughs High School	Academic deficiencies
		(Philippines)	Frederick Cayetano		2nd		Academic deficiencies

=== Additions ===
Pos.	No.	Nat.	Player	Height	Year	High school	Notes
SG	9	(Philippines)	Rudolf Belmonte	5' 11"	2nd	San Beda College	Returning from Season 50
C	11	(Philippines)	Edward Joseph Feihl	7' 0"	1st	University of Santo Tomas	Rookie
PG	14	(Philippines)	Bethune Tanquingcen	5' 9"	1st	Philippine Cultural High School	Rookie
PF	16	(Philippines)	Dennis Espino	6' 6"	1st	Holy Angel University	Rookie
PG	18	(Philippines)	Vincent Kenneth Favis	5' 11"	2nd	La Salle Greenhills	Transferred from De La Salle University
SG		(Philippines)	James Sichon	5' 10"	3rd	University of St. La Salle	Returning from Season 51
C		(Philippines)	Peter Tioseco	6' 7"	1st	Lourdes School of Mandaluyong	Rookie
C		(Philippines)	Benjie Bendillo				
SF		(Philippines)	A. Miranda				

== Injuries ==
Rookie center EJ Feihl was running third in the statistical points tally behind teammate Billy Reyes and La Salle's Jun Limpot before falling ill from a heart condition. He did not suit up in their second-round game against the NU Bulldogs as he had to be transferred to the Philippine Heart Center from the UST Hospital. He returned on September 16 in their game against FEU after being confined for three weeks.

== Schedule and results ==
=== UAAP games ===
Elimination games were played in a double round-robin format. All games were aired on IBC 13 by Vintage Sports.

UAAP Season 53 game log

Elimination round: 8–6
Game	Date • Time	Opponent	Result	Record	High points	High rebounds	High assists	Location
1	Jul 28 • 4:00 pm	FEU Tamaraws	W 95–83	1–0	Feihl (18)			Ninoy Aquino Stadium Manila
2 (Note: The team's 80–90 loss to La Salle was overturned after the league ruled Green Archer Noli Locsin to be ineligible.)	Aug 8 • 2:30 pm	De La Salle Green Archers	W	2–0				
3	Aug 12 • 2:30 pm	Adamson Soaring Falcons	W	3–0				
4	Aug 19 • 5:30 pm	Ateneo Blue Eagles	W	4–0				
5	Aug 22 • 4:00 pm	NU Bulldogs	W	5–0				
6	Aug 26 • 5:30 pm	UP Fighting Maroons	W	6–0				
7	Aug 29 • 2:30 pm	UE Red Warriors; End of R1 of eliminations	W	7–0				
8	Sep 2 • 12:00 pm	NU Bulldogs	W 101–89	8–0	Sichon (20)			Rizal Memorial Coliseum Manila
9	Sep 8 • 4:30 pm	UP Fighting Maroons	L 66–75	8–1	Belmonte (22)			Rizal Memorial Coliseum Manila
10	Sep 12 • 12:00 pm	UE Red Warriors	L 89–97	8–2	Sichon (22)			Rizal Memorial Coliseum Manila
11	Sep 16 • 1:30 pm	FEU Tamaraws	L 76–88	8–3	Belmonte (18)			Araneta Coliseum Quezon City
12	Sep 23 • 4:30 pm	Ateneo Blue Eagles	L 73–76	8–4	Favis (19)			Rizal Memorial Coliseum Manila
13	Sep 27 • 3:00 pm	Adamson Soaring Falcons	L 90–93	8–5	Reyes (22)			Rizal Memorial Coliseum Manila
14	Sep 30 • 12:00 pm	De La Salle Green Archers; End of R2 of eliminations	L 78–80	8–6				Araneta Coliseum Quezon City

(#) Tournament seedings in parentheses.
All times are in UTC+08:00.
Source: Google News Archives

=== Postseason tournament ===
Postseason game log

1991 PRISAA–NCR Basketball Championship: 2–2
Game	Date • Time	Opponent	Result	Record	High points	High rebounds	High assists	Location
1	Jan 4 • 10:00 am	TIP Engineers	W 91–89	1–0	Cabaluna (22)			Arellano Taft Gym Pasay
2	Jan 5 • 11:30 am	UE Red Warriors	W 101–99	2–0	Reyes (28)			Arellano Taft Gym Pasay
3	Jan 7 • 11:30 am	FEU Tamaraws	L 72–79	2–1	Sichon (19)			Arellano Taft Gym Pasay
4	Jan 8 • 2:30 pm	Adamson Soaring Falcons; Semifinal round	L 86–94	2–2	Cabaluna (25)			Arellano Taft Gym Pasay

(#) Tournament seedings in parentheses.
All times are in UTC+08:00.
