= Westminster High School (Manila) =

Private Chinese high school in Manila, Philippines

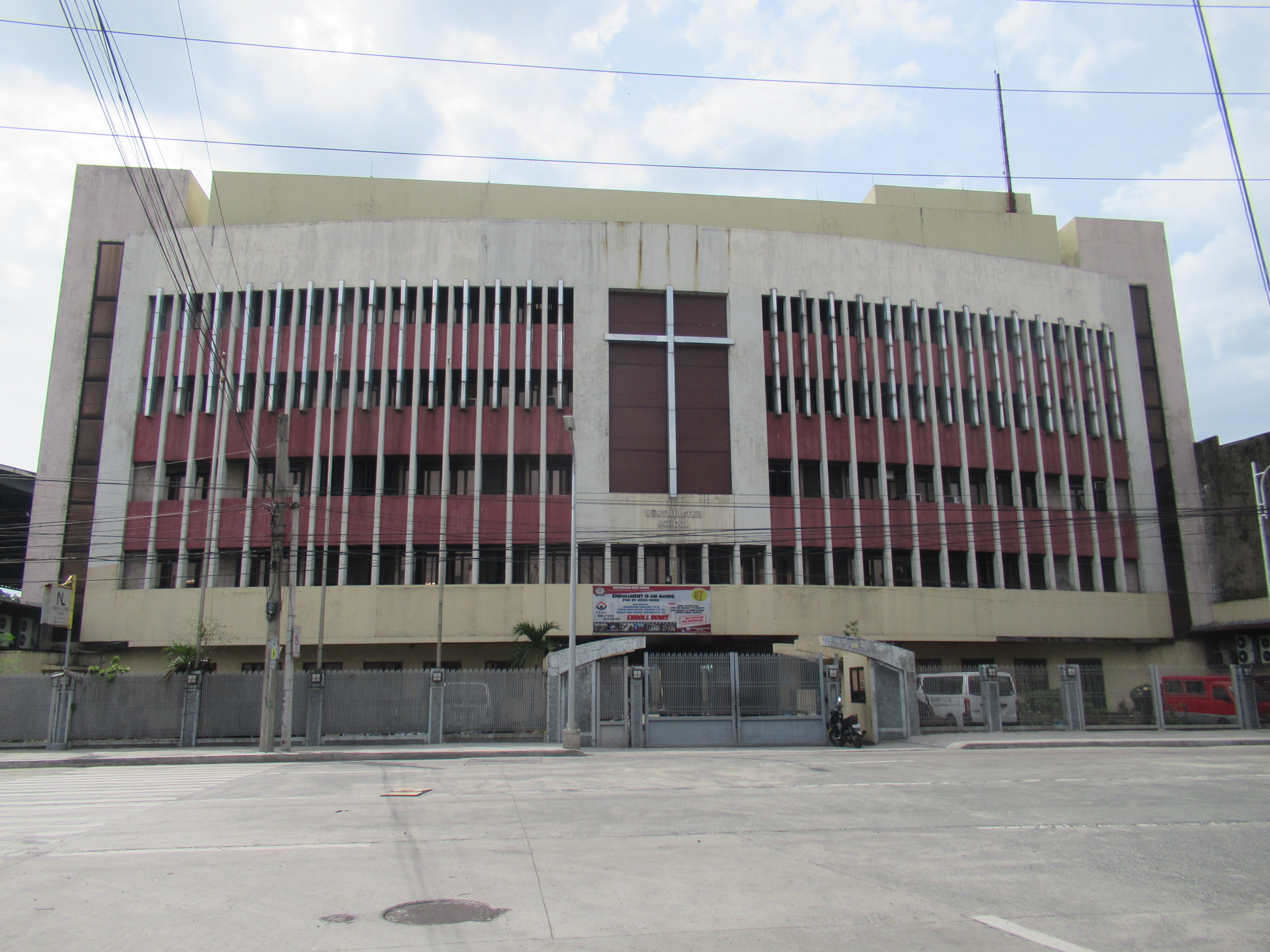

Location
- 60-68 Honorio Lopez Boulevard, Tondo, Manila; Manila, Metro Manila; Philippines
- Coordinates: 14°38′06″N 120°57′42″E

Information
- Type: Private, Chinese, Christian
- Established: 1935
- President: Mr. Joshua Anthony P. Chiok
- Principal: Mrs. Cherry M. Chiok
- Grades: K to 12
- Enrollment: approx. 500
- Language: English, Filipino
- Color: █ █

Westminster High School (simplified Chinese: 培元中学; traditional Chinese: 培元中學; pinyin: Péiyuán Zhōngxué; Pe̍h-ōe-jī: Pôe-goân Tiong-o̍h / Pôe-oân Tiong-o̍h; acronym: WHS), founded by Madam Elizabeth Kho in 1935, is a private, Chinese, Christian educational institution in Manila, Philippines. It has a sister-school under the same name in Taiwan.

Since the 1930s, the school had been offering Chinese courses from kindergarten up to high school, however, in 2001, it abolished the Chinese curriculum and ceased from participating in sports competitions with other Chinese schools in Metro Manila. As a result, the student population of Chinese and Filipino-Chinese has declined steadily over the years.

Recently, under the new management, the school refurbished its facilities, adopted the Singaporean Math method to its curriculum, and reintroduced Chinese language classes to its students.
