= Zamboanga Chong Hua High School =

Private Chinese high school in Zamboanga City, Philippines

- 三宝颜中华中学

Location
- Gen. V. Alvarez Street; Zamboanga City, Zamboanga del Sur; Philippines
- Coordinates: 6°54′15″N 122°04′42″E

Information
- Type: Co-educational, non-sectarian
- Established: November 12, 1919
- School code: 404966
- President: Rufino Lim
- Principal: Dr. Simon L. Chua, D.T.
- Grades: Nursery to Grade 12
- Enrollment: 2,000+
- Colors: Ford Blue and White
- Website: www.zchonghua.edu.ph

Zamboanga Chong Hua High School (ZCHHS; simplified Chinese: 三宝颜中华中学; traditional Chinese: 三寶顏中華中學; pinyin: Sānbǎoyán Zhōnghuá Zhōngxué; Pe̍h-ōe-jī: Sam-pó-gân Tiong-hôa Tiong-o̍h) is a private, non-sectarian Chinese Filipino secondary school in Zamboanga City, Philippines. It was founded on November 12, 1919.

== History ==
In 1917, the Chinese community in Zamboanga City began to grow rapidly. Two years later, the Zamboanga Chinese Elementary School (now Zamboanga Chong Hua High School) was established on November 12, 1919, by members of the Chinese community including Yu Bon Chia, Gan San Din, and Yu Si Chiong, among others. The school began with over 1,000 students.

Originally, the institution aimed to provide Chinese children with education in Mandarin. It also promoted the ideals of Sun Yat-sen, whose birth anniversary coincides with the school's foundation day. As it evolved into a community school, it gained strong financial and moral support from local Chinese residents, fostering its expansion.

Initially located along Magay Street, the school transferred to Gov. Lim Avenue to accommodate a growing student population. In 1926, a three-storey concrete building was erected, and by school year 1926–1927, the Chinese curriculum for secondary education was introduced. In 1929, the school relocated to its current site on Marahui Street (now Gen. Vicente Alvarez Street).

During World War II, much of the school's infrastructure and records were destroyed. Reconstruction efforts were led by Mr. Ong Bee Kong, one of the founding members, with the help of other benefactors and community leaders.

The Philippine government formally recognized the school in 1958.

In 1965, a four-storey concrete building was constructed to replace the old two-storey structure. The school celebrated its 50th anniversary in 1969.

In 1978, the Zamboanga Chong Hua High School Alumni Association (ZCHHSAA) was established by Ms. Leticia Alvarez, composed of students from the first to tenth grade batches.

In 1981, a new building was constructed and turned over to the Board of Trustees, followed by a third building in 1989 that included a gym on the top floor. By that year, the school had three main buildings:

- Building A (海华, *Hai Hua*) – Administration offices
- Building B (颜华, *Yan Hua*) – Primary education
- Building C (光华, *Guang Hua*) – Secondary education

=== 90th anniversary celebration ===
On November 12, 2009, the school celebrated its 90th anniversary. A Lauriat Night was held on November 13, followed by a Grand Alumni Homecoming on November 15.

In 2015, a fourth building was constructed for preschool and senior high school programs, officially named the Zhong Hua (中华) Building.

=== 100th anniversary celebration ===
In 2019, Zamboanga Chong Hua High School celebrated its centennial. The festivities began on November 7 with a Thanksgiving Mass at St. Joseph Church. Subsequent events included a Great Gatsby-themed Lauriat Night and Lantern Parade on November 8, followed by a Grand Alumni Fellowship on November 9, and a Centennial Night celebration on November 10, all held at the Grand Astoria Regency in Pasonanca. During the same year, the school completed construction of an 885-square-meter covered court.

Preceded by Baguio Patriotic High School; June 1918	Oldest Chinese schools in the Philippines; Ninth; November 12, 1919	Succeeded by Sulu Tong Jin School; October 10, 1920
