= Philippine Chen Kuang High School =

Private school in Metro Manila, Philippines

Coordinates: 14°35′56″N 121°2′11″E

Philippine Chen Kuang High School Chinese: 菲律宾晨光中学/ 菲律賓晨光中學
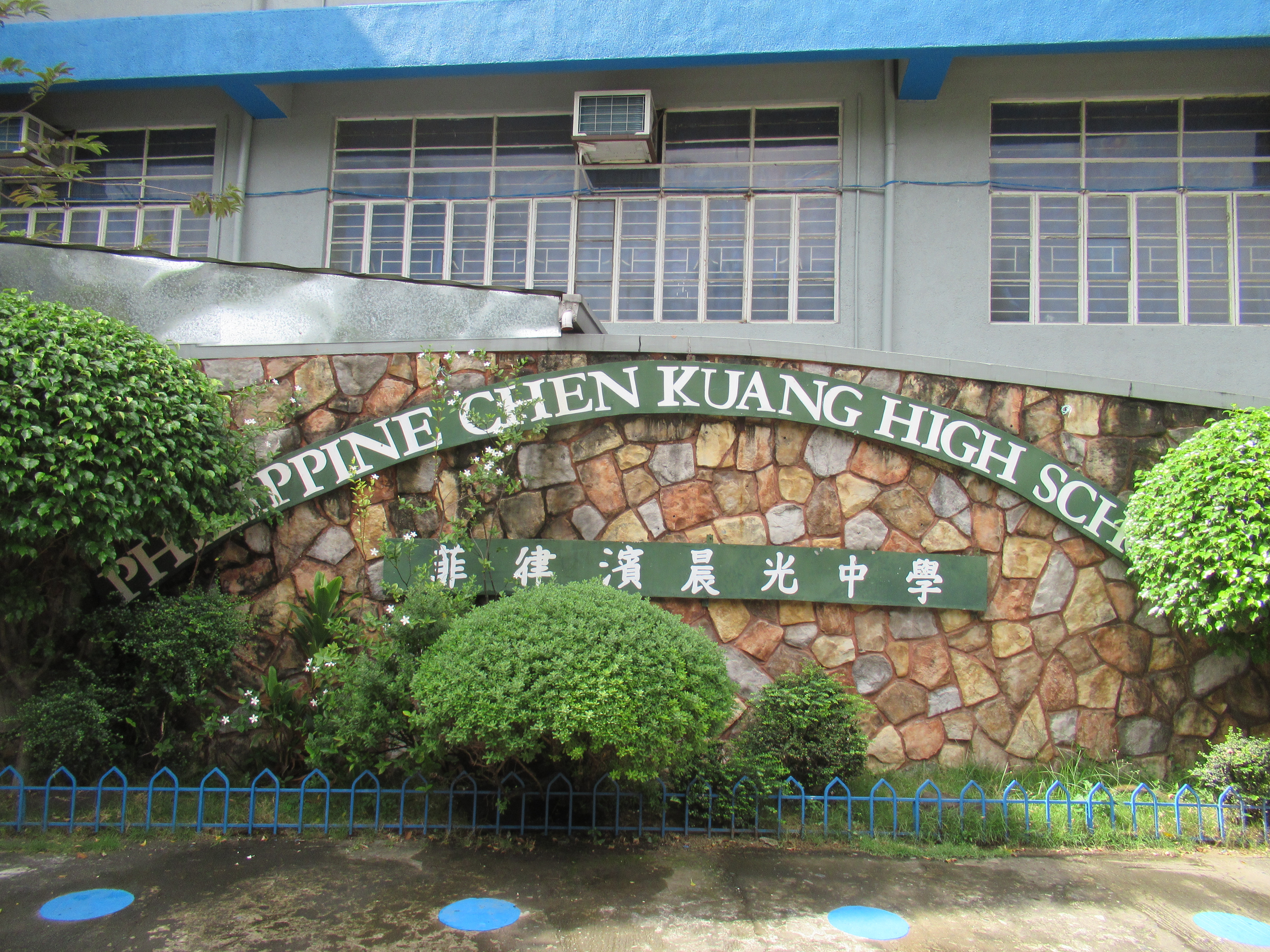

Information
- Language: English; Filipino; Chinese

Philippine Chen Kuang High School (PCKHS) (simplified Chinese: 菲律宾晨光中学; traditional Chinese: 菲律賓晨光中學; pinyin: Fēilǜbīn Chénguāng Zhōngxué) is a private school with English, Filipino, and Chinese language classes. PCKHS is located at 210 P. Parada Street, Brgy. Santa Lucia, San Juan, Metro Manila. PCKHS is a non-stock, non-profit school. Effective SY 2015–2016, the principal is Mr. Steve Christopher Wong.
