= Lorenzo Ruiz Academy =

Catholic Chinese school in Manila, Philippines

Coordinates: 14°36′02″N 120°58′31″E

Lorenzo Ruiz Academy or Blessed Lorenzo Ruiz - Crusaders Academy as it appears on the facade of the school, (simplified Chinese: 圣军中学; traditional Chinese: 聖軍中學; pinyin: Shèngjūn Zhōngxué; Pe̍h-ōe-jī: Sìng-kun Tiong-o̍h) is formerly known as the Crusaders' Academy, is a Filipino-Chinese Catholic school in Ongpin Street corner E.T. Yuchengco Street (formerly Nueva St.), Binondo, Manila, Philippines. The school was founded by the Order of Preachers, also known as the Dominican Order, and opened its first gate in 1946.

The school was named after Lorenzo Ruiz, the country's first Protomartyr. In 2016, it celebrated its 70th founding anniversary.

== History ==
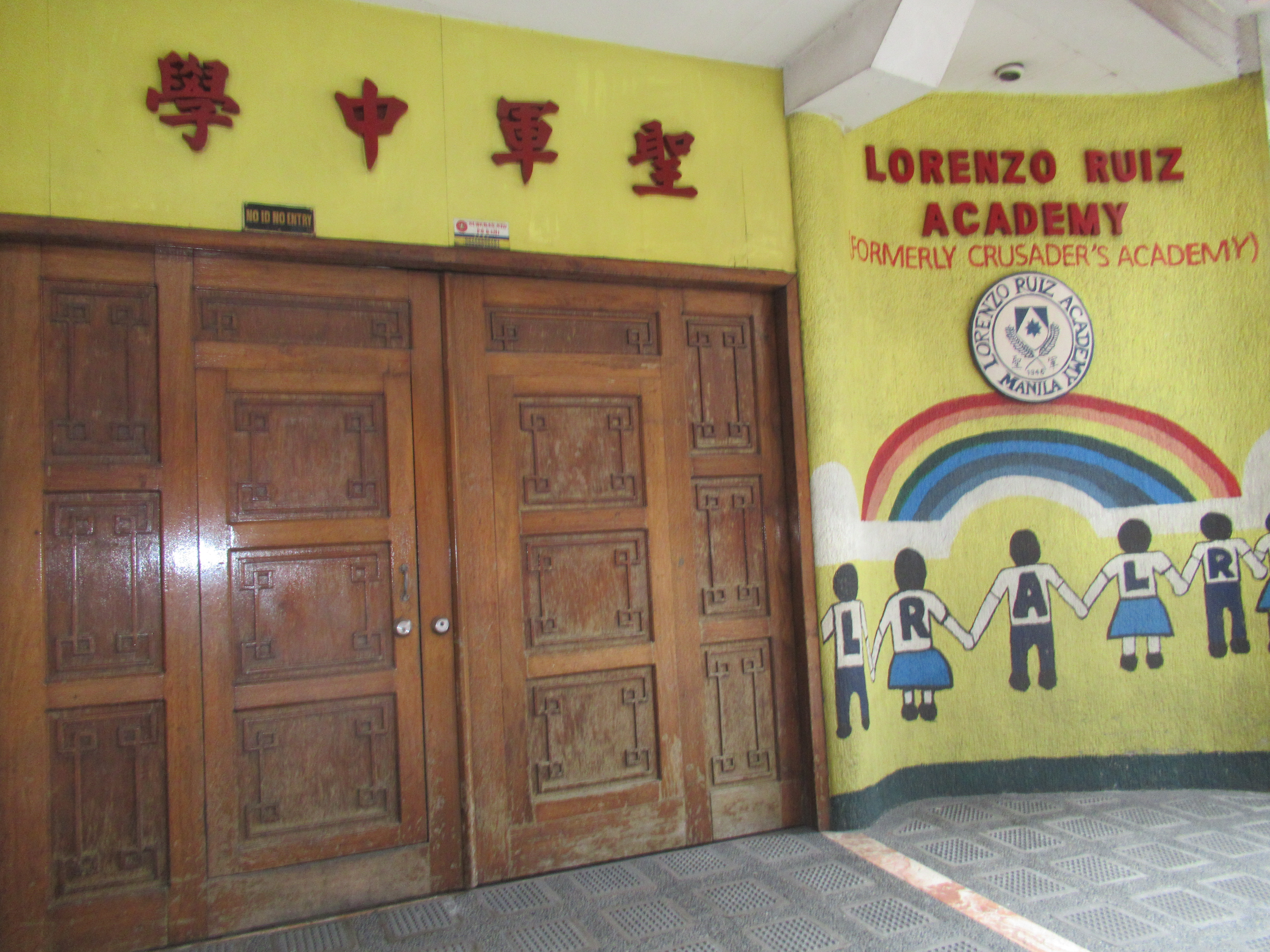
Gates of Lorenzo Ruiz Academy

=== Parish of Binondo ===
On September 22, 1944, the American Air Forces, in its mission to free the city of Manila from the Japanese occupation, heavily bombarded the entire city. Unfortunately, the church and the convent in Binondo were not spared from the destruction. A great deal of valuable religious, historical items and records were also destroyed.

Notwithstanding the war, Fr. Antonio Garcia, O.P. parish priest for Chinese Catholics continued his apostolic work by celebrating daily masses and hearing confessions in the house of Mr. Jose Co-Ching-Yan. His unselfishness and dedication to the spiritual well-being of his parishioners attracted many Chinese Catholics who felt the presence of God in their lives during the war years.

After the war and the situation returned to normal, Fr. Antonio Garcia, enlightened by the Holy Spirit, pushed for the restoration of the Parish of Binondo. He sought the assistance of Msgr. O’Doherty, then Archbishop of Manila, on how the Chinese Parish should be restructured. Finally, on April 27, 1945, a 700-meter area was granted for the purpose of constructing a new and small church exclusively for the Chinese residents of Manila.

On October 28, 1945, the blessings and inauguration of the church took place and Fr. Antonio's dream of having an exclusive parish for the Chinese of Manila became a reality, a reality that is very much alive and present to this very day.

Parish priests who have devoted their efforts to serving the Chinese community during and after the Second World War are Fr. Antonio Garcia, O.P.; Fr. Juan Fernandez, O.P.; Fr. Emilio Calderon, O.P.; Fr. Luis Sierra, O.P.; and Fr. Javier Arrazola, O.P.

=== Lorenzo Ruiz Academy ===
With the parish already established and organized, Fr. Antonio also felt the importance of evangelizing the youth. With this in mind, he devoted all his efforts to this cause. He felt the need to give them a genuine and strong Christian formation. To achieve this goal, he thought of putting up a school.

As expected, he faced a myriad of difficulties and problems. Nonetheless, Father Antonio was determined to go ahead with his plan and have it materialized. His efforts paid off and on July 14, 1946, the Apostolic Nuncio Msgr. Guillermo Piani inaugurated the school under the name of Crusader's Academy, which was later changed to its present name Lorenzo Ruiz Academy in honor of St. Lorenzo Ruiz, the first canonized Filipino-Chinese Martyr, who also served in this parish.

Directors who have devoted their energies working for the formation of the youth in our school are Fr. Antonio Garcia, O.P.- Founder; Fr. Juan Fernandez, O.P.; Fr. Fabian Vela, O.P.; Fr. Juan Lera, O.P.; Fr. Dionisio Cabezon, O.P.; Fr. Florencio Testera, O.P.; and present Director Fr. Jerome Wu, O.P.

== Curricula ==
=== K-12 Basic Education System ===
Since school year 2015–2016, the school complies with the K-12 Basic Education Curriculum implemented by the Department of Education and is now effective for all levels in Kindergarten, Elementary, High School departments. Additional senior high school year levels Grade 11 and Grade 12 started in June 2016 and June 2017, respectively.
