= Philippine Cultural College =

Private Chinese college in Metro Manila, Philippines

- 菲律濱僑中學院
- Former names: Philippine Chinese High School (1923–1975); Philippine Cultural High School (1976–2008)
- Type: Private, Non-sectarian
- Established: June 27, 1923
- Affiliations: PAASCU level III
- Location: Manila, Caloocan and Quezon City, Metro Manila, Philippines; 14°37′20.31″N 121°0′13.36″E
- Campus: Manila Campus (Main), Caloocan Campus (Annex), Quezon City Campus (College)
- Colors: Green and Yellow
- Nickname: Seagulls
- Website: philippineculturalcollege.edu.ph
- Location in Metro Manila Location in Luzon Location in the Philippines

Philippine Cultural College
- Traditional Chinese: 菲律濱僑中學院
- Simplified Chinese: 菲律滨侨中学院
Transcriptions
Standard Mandarin
- Hanyu Pinyin: Fēilǜbīn Qiáozhōng Xuéyuàn
Southern Min
- Hokkien POJ: Hui-lu̍t-pin Kiâu-tiong Ha̍k-īⁿ

Façade of the Philippine Cultural College in 2015

Philippine Cultural College (simplified Chinese: 菲律滨侨中学院; traditional Chinese: 菲律滨僑中學院; pinyin: Fēilǜbīn Qiáozhōng Xuéyuàn; Pe̍h-ōe-jī: Hui-li̍p-pin Kiâu-tiong Ha̍k-īⁿ; abbreviated as PCC) is a Chinese Filipino school with three campuses located in Manila, Caloocan and Quezon City, Metro Manila, Philippines, established on June 27, 1923 by the Philippine Chinese Educational Association. PCC is the oldest Chinese Filipino secondary school in the Philippines. It is a non-stock, non-profit, and non-sectarian co-educational institution offering preschool, and has a Level III re-accredited status from the Philippine Accrediting Association of Schools, Colleges and Universities (PAASCU) for its grade school and high school. Its programs emphasize in the English, Filipino, and Mandarin Chinese languages, mathematics, science, and information technology.

== History ==
=== Founding and early years ===
The school was originally named Philippine Chinese High School. It was established by the Philippine Chinese Educational Association in 1923, under the leadership of Don Carlos Palanca Sr. With 47 students, classes were first held using the two classrooms of Anglo Chinese School (now Tiong Se Academy). The first day of classes occurred on June 27, 1923.

In 1937, the first batch of alumni organized the PCHS Alumni Association, with Mr. Go Seng Guan elected as the first president. He was succeeded by Mr. Kong Kuan. In 1938, the school was authorized by the Educational Association to organize a board of trustees which would take over the management of the school. Mr. Go Chong Beng was the first chairman of the board. For 15 years, Mr. Chow Cing Chian, Mr. Tsai Xiang Chang, Mr. Tiu See Eng, Mr. King She Hiong, Mr. Shu Seng Shan, and Mr. Huang Meng Kuei served as school principal one after another.

=== Japanese occupation and fire ===
In 1939, Teng Chiu Huang became the school's seventh principal. In 1940, a new school building was constructed along Jose Abad Santos Street. Classes were held both at the new building and at the former site of the Anglo Chinese School. In January 1942, the Imperial Japanese Army invaded the City of Manila. The new school building was forcibly occupied by the Japanese troops, and classes were suspended. In May 1945, the school was the first one within Manila to reopen after the war. In 1948, expansion of the Abad Santos school building was completed. The old school building was turned over to the Anglo Chinese School.

On May 2, 1949, at 11:30 in the evening, the entire school building and its records and papers were destroyed in a neighborhood fire. Under the leadership of T.C. Huang and Sy Eng, the president of the Educational Association and the chairman of the board of trustees, the school gathered donations from various sectors of the Chinese community to support the school's reconstruction. On November 11 of that same year, a new school building was finally completed.

=== Expansion and Filipinization ===
On November 11, 1960, T.C. Huang died after serving as the principal for 20 years. On December 8 of that same year, the Board of Trustees appointed Go Seng Guan as the principal.

In 1961, using the funds from the Dr. T. C. Huang Memorial Foundation, the school bought a 10,000 square meter property in Caloocan. The Department of Education approved the construction of a new campus in Caloocan in 1967. Classes were held in June of that same year, with more than 300 students.

On November 8, 1963, Sy Eng, the chairman of the board of trustees, died. Chung Tiong Tay succeeded him.

In 1976, the government Filipinized all Chinese schools in the Philippines. The school was renamed Philippine Cultural High School. Around this time, both the Manila and the Caloocan campuses began offering preschool and primary education.

The activities of the Alumni Association were temporarily suspended due to the dictatorship of Ferdinand Marcos. In its place, alumni created the PCHS Alumni Coordinating Committee, with Marcos Chua as the liaison officer. In 1976, the Alumni Association was restarted, with Chuang Chong Chian as the president. In 1978, the Alumni Association successfully assisted the board of trustees in the fund raising campaign for the expansion project of the Caloocan campus.

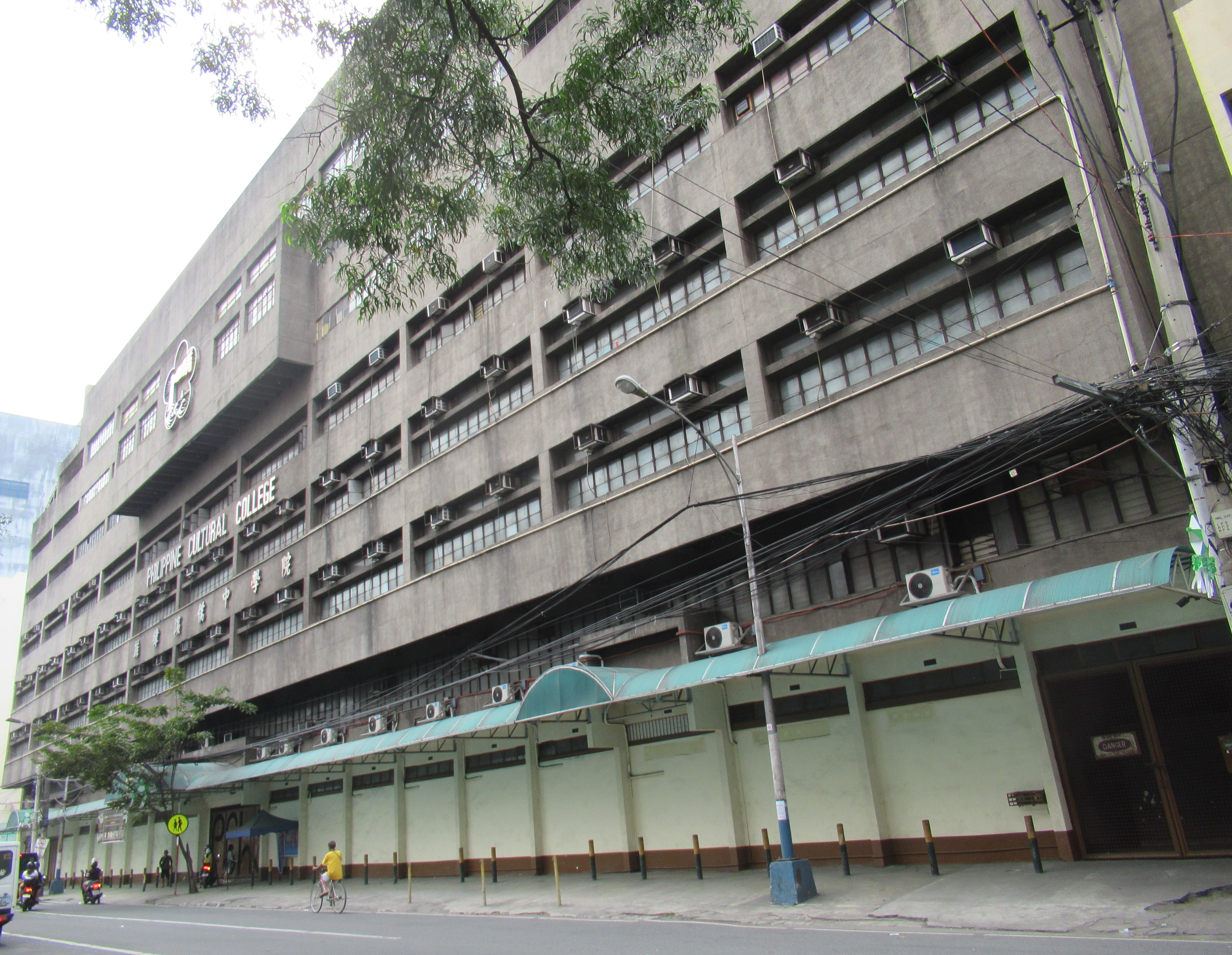
Tondo Campus

=== Development ===
In the 1980s, the Board of Trustees, the Alumni Association, and the school authorities realized the imperative need for further development in order to meet the demands of the changing times. Taking the suggestion of the principal, Mr. Go Seng Guan, the reconstruction of the Manila building started under the leadership of Mr. Chung Tiong Tay, the chairman of the board of trustees.

On January 11, 1986, while the construction of the main school building was on its peak, Mr. Go Seng Guan died at age 80 after serving the school for 50 years. In that same year, the Board of Trustees appointed Dr. Fernando Gan as the ninth principal of the school. Mr. Emilio Gan was appointed assistant principal of Manila Campus, while Ms. Susana Bairan was appointed as the assistant principal of the Caloocan Campus.

In June 1988, the new school building in the Manila campus was inaugurated. To commemorate this event, the cultural show "An Odyssey" was staged. Subsequent cultural shows included "The Blooming Sunflowers" (1990), "D' Little Twinkling Stars" (1992), "Salinlahi" (1993), "Pagdiriwang" (1998), "Tomorrow's Promise" (2000), "PCHS at 80" (2003), "The Golden Cradle" (2005), and "March On, PCHS" (2008).

After the completion of the new school building, the president of the Alumni Association, Mr. John Tan, spearheaded the fund-raising campaign for the "PCHS Faculty and Staff Mutual Aid Fund". In 1989, the Board of Trustees organized the PCHS Educational Foundation to ensure the effective management of these endowments.

In 1989, Dr. Fernando Gan resigned as principal because of failing health. The Board of Trustees promoted Mr. Emilio Gan as the 10th principal of the school. Ms. Susana Bairan remained the assistant principal.

In 1990, realizing that the quality of Chinese education had deteriorated, and that the instructional materials had become old and obsolete, board chairman Mr. Chung Tiong Tay used his personal money to hire experts to revise and prepare instructional materials that would suit the needs of the local students. With this, Mr. Gan introduced "Teaching/Learning Chinese as a Secondary Language," the latest pedagogy developed specifically for non-native speakers.

In 1991, spearheaded by the several members of the board of trustees and directors of the Alumni Association, the Philippine Chinese Education Research Center was established. It was tasked to promote reforms in the Chinese language teaching within the country. A 10-million peso seed fund was collected from alumni and patrons.

To uplift the quality of education and improve the instructional facilities, the school applied for accreditation from PAASCU. Both the Manila and the Caloocan campuses were granted Level II accreditation status for five years. After Dr. Chuang Chong Chian, the Alumni Association went under the leadership of Mr. Ang Cheng Tionsu, Ms. Bee Keng Elena Cu Uy Gam, Mr. John Tan, Ms. Mary Lim, Mr. Eduardo Chua, Ms. Pilar Ongking, Dr. Tan King King, Ms. Janet Kopio, Mr. Alfredo Lu, Mr. Peter Gaisano, Mr. Sy Uliong, Mr. Angel Tan and the incumbent Ms. Diana To.

In 1994, Ms. Susana Bairan, the assistant principal, retired from office after 27 years of service. Upon her retirement, she was appointed as a member of the board of trustees. At the same time, the Board of Trustees appointed Mr. Antonio O as the Officer-in-Charge of the Caloocan campus. The Board of Trustees passed a resolution to construct a modern 4-story kindergarten building on the Caloocan campus.

In 1995, the Kinder Day Care was established. In 1999, a science building was constructed on the Caloocan campus.

After more than 30 years of service, Mr. Chung retired as the chairman of the board of trustees in May 2000; he was succeeded by Mr. John Tan.

In 2001, Mr. Antonio O retired as the Officer-in-Charge of the Caloocan campus. The Board of Trustees appointed Ms. Yolanda Que as the administrative head of the Caloocan campus until 2008.

In 2002, Dr. Chuang Chong Chian succeeded Mr. John Tan as the chairman of the board of trustees. At the same time, the Board appointed Dr. Sining Marcos Kotah as the administrative head of the Manila campus, assisting the principal in leading the Manila campus.

Aside from developing its curriculum, the school also established sister school relations with schools in China like Huaqiao University, Jin Jiang Nan Qiao Middle School, Shi Shi No. 8 Middle School, Shi Shi No. 3 Middle School, Shi Shi Experimental School, Qiao Sheng Middle School, Ying Lin Middle School, etc. Both parties have established a long term relationship, interacting regularly to help each other continuously improve their educational standards.

In 2004, Mr. Eduardo Chua succeeded Dr. Chuang Chong Chian as the chairman of the board of trustees.

In 2006, Ms. Bee Keng Elena Cu Uy Gam succeeded Mr. Eduardo Chua to become the first female chairman of the board of trustees. During her term, she began working on the application for the opening of the college department.

In 2008, Ms. Pilar Ongking succeeded Ms. Bee Keng Elena Cu Uy Gam as the chairman of the board of trustees. Mr. Emilio Gan, after 38 years of service, retired from office. He was appointed as a member of the Board of Trustees. Also in 2008, the same year, the school opened its college and changed its name to Philippine Cultural College (PCC). The school changed its organizational structure, with the president being the highest in office and a vice president each for the college and the basic education departments. Dr. Lily Go was named president of Philippine Cultural College and Dr. Sining M. Kotah as vice president of the secondary, elementary and kindergarten departments of both the Manila and the Caloocan campuses.

A new college building was proposed, to be constructed on a lot donated by Mr. Benito Cu and Ms. Elena Cu Uy Gam in Quezon City. The ground-breaking ceremony was held on January 15, 2012. Later that year, Mr. Angel Tan succeeded Ms. Pilar Ongking as the chairman of the board of trustees.

In June 2013, a celebration was held to commemorate the 90th anniversary of Philippine Cultural College.

== Campuses ==
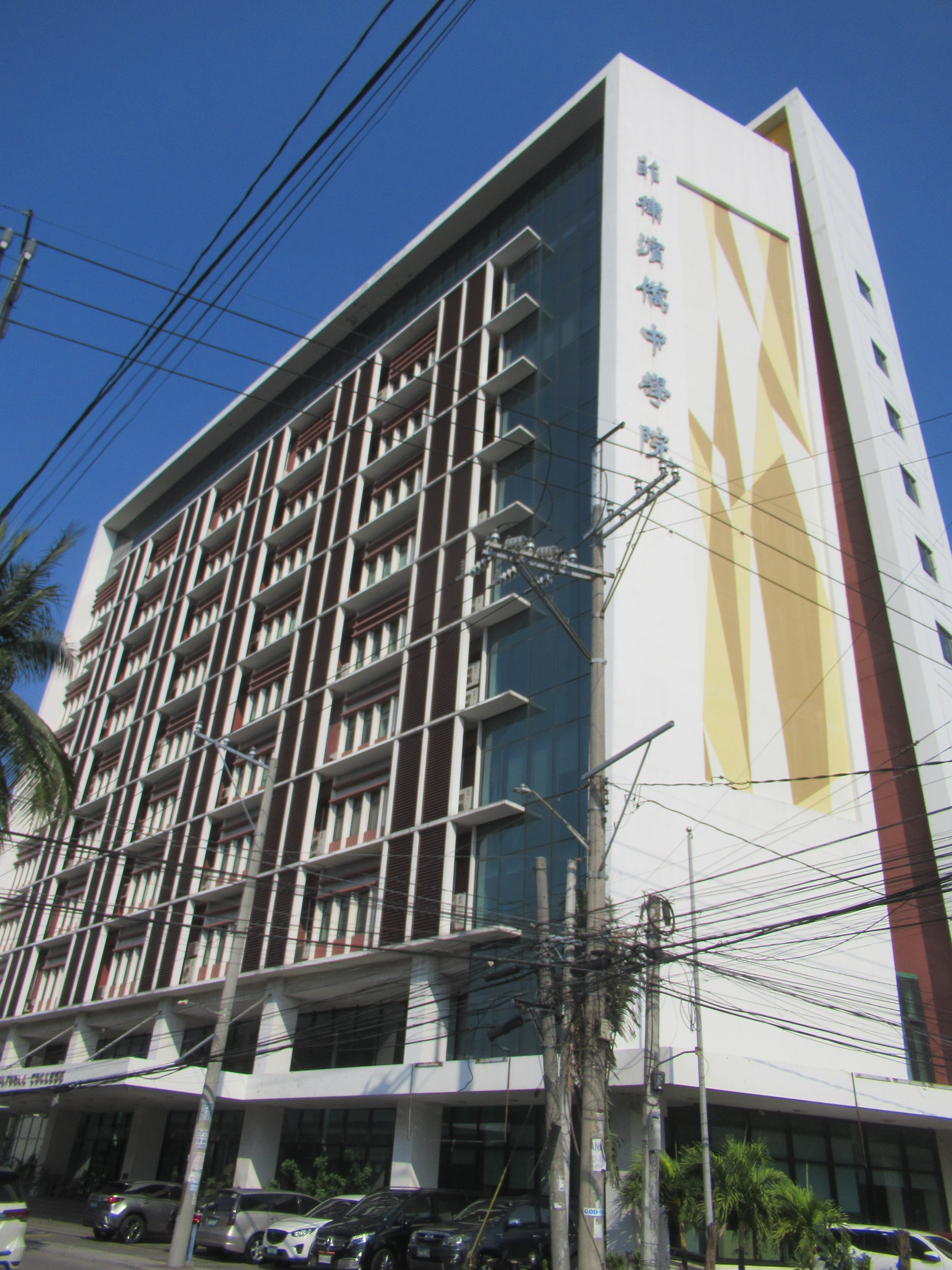
Quezon City Campus

The Manila campus is located at 1253 Jose Abad Santos Ave., Tondo, Manila.

The Caloocan campus is at 175 8th Ave. Extension, Grace Park, Caloocan.

The Quezon City Campus is at 46 M. Cuenco St., Cor. D. Tuazon St., Quezon City.

== School programs ==
The basic education department offers two types of Kindergarten program. Both programs focus on the cognitive, social and psychomotor aspects of development of the child. The Kinder–Regular program offers half-day classes for pre-nursery, nursery & Kinder I students, as well as whole-day classes for Kinder II students. The Kinder–Day Care program offers whole-day classes with sleeping time, lunch, and afternoon snacks incorporated into students' daily activities.

=== College courses ===
- Bachelor of Science in Hotel & Restaurant Management
- Bachelor of Science in Tourism Management
- Bachelor of Science in Business Administration
  - Major in Human Resource Development
  - Major in Operations (Business) Management
  - Major in Marketing Management
- Bachelor of Science in Information Technology
- Bachelor of Secondary Education
  - Major in Teaching Chinese as a Second Language
- Bachelor of Elementary Education
  - Major in Early Childhood Education

== Accreditation ==
The PCC's grade school and high school have Level III re-accredited status from the Philippine Accrediting Association of Schools, Colleges and Universities (PAASCU).
