= Philippine Tong Ho Institute =

Private Chinese school in Lucena, Philippines

- 罗申那同和中学 (Chinese)
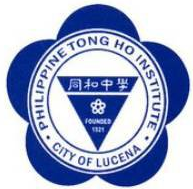

Location
- Lucena City, Quezon Province; Philippines
- 13°55′48″N 121°36′49″E

Information
- Type: Private, Chinese School
- Established: February 1921
- Grades: 7 - 10
- Colors: Blue and White
- Mascot: Dragon
- Nickname: Tong Ho

The Philippine Tong Ho Institute (simplified Chinese: 罗申那同和中学; traditional Chinese: 羅申那同和中學; Pe̍h-ōe-jī: Lô͘-sin-nā Tông-hô͘ Tiong-o̍h) is a Chinese high school in Lucena City, Quezon. It was founded February 14, 1921. It has a small population of students and is a small campus.
