= Philippine Chung Hua School =

Private school in Metro Manila, Philippines

- 菲律賓中華中學
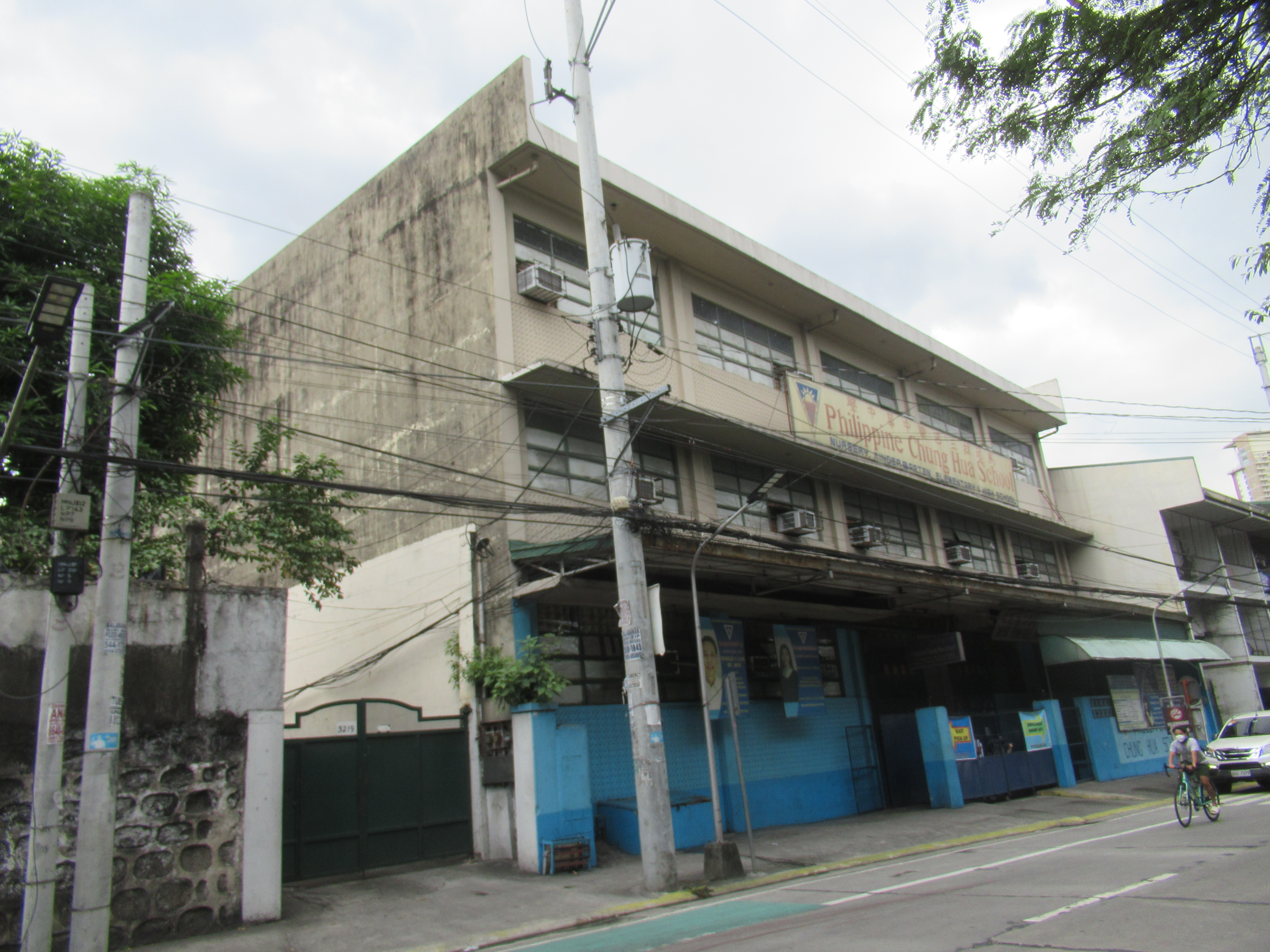

Location
- 3217 Reposo Street, Santa Mesa, Manila; Philippines
- Coordinates: 14°35′54″N 121°0′57″E

Information
- Opened: August 20, 2013
- Grades: K to 12
- Nickname: PCHS

The Philippine Chung Hua School (PCHS) is located at 3217 Reposo Street, Santa Mesa, Manila, Philippines. The school teaches Chinese and Filipino, as well as English.

== History ==
The Philippine Chung Hua School was originally located on G. Tuazon Street, near the corner of M. Arenas, in Sampaloc, Manila. During that time, the school was a simple two-story building, occupying about 600 square feet. All classrooms, grade 1 to grade 5 were located on the second floor. The principal's and teachers' offices were located on the ground floor. The Manila Sampaloc Chinese-Filipino Chamber of Commerce was also located on the first floor. Now, it is a school that teaches Kindergarten to Grade 12
