= Tiong Se Academy =

Private school in Metro Manila, Philippines

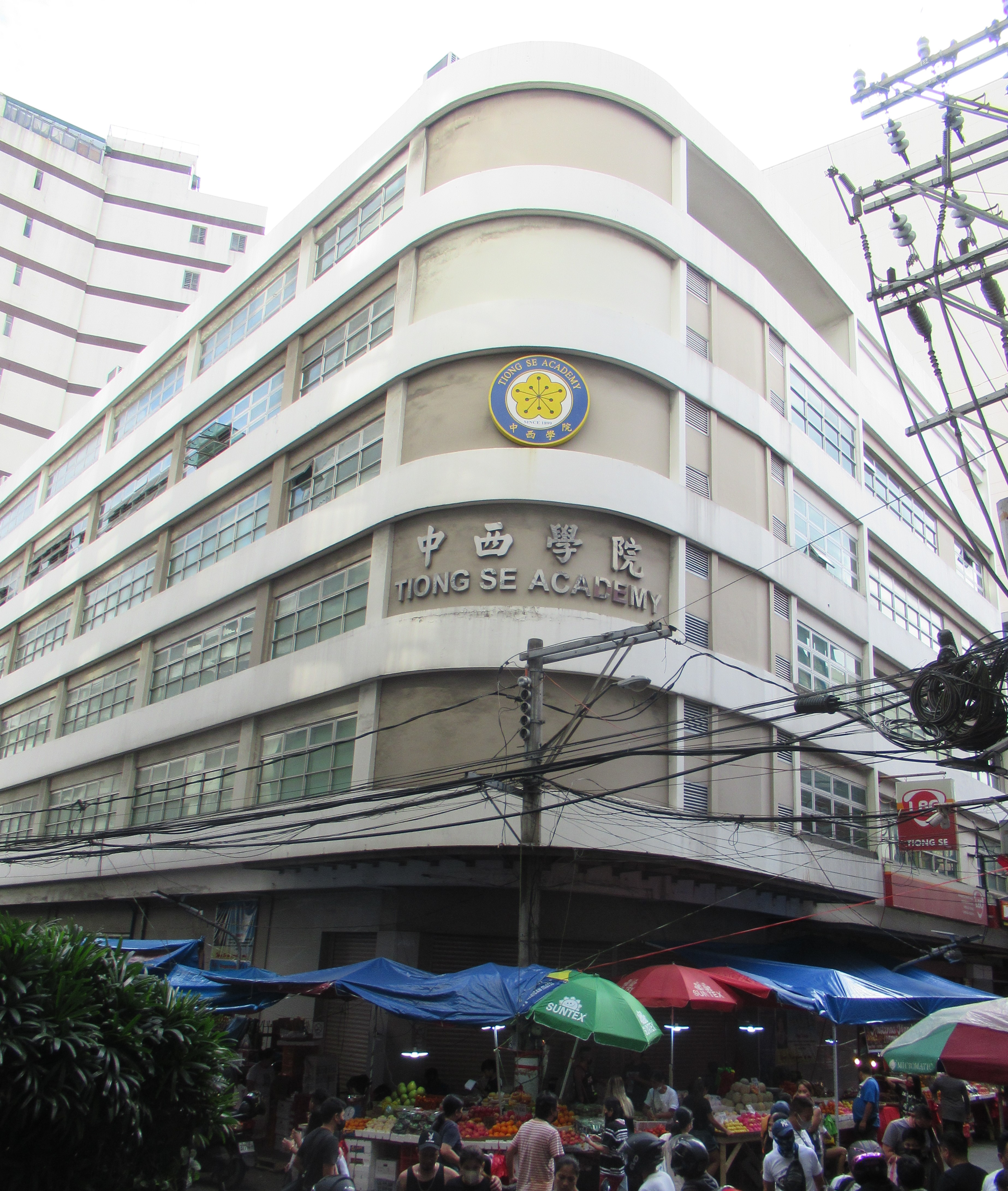

Location
- Binondo; Manila, Metro Manila; Philippines; 14.60365°N 120.97257°E

Information
- School type: Private, Chinese
- Motto: 有恒，崇实，自重，爱群 (Perseverance, truthfulness, dignity, sense of community)
- Established: April 15, 1899
- Founder: Engracio Guinco Palanca (Tan Kang)
- Principal: Margarita Gutierrez
- Grades: 1 to 12
- Language: Mandarin Chinese, Hokkien (for Chinese curriculum); English, Filipino (for English curriculum)
- Colors: Blue, White, and Yellow
- Song: "TSA School Song" (中西学院校歌)
- Former names: Anglo-Chinese School (c. 1902–1923, 1935–1975); First Chinese Elementary School (1923–1935); Tiong Se Academy (1975–1996); Philippine Tiong Se Academy (1996–2013)
- Website: beta.tiongseacademy.edu.ph

Chinese name
- Chinese: 中西學院
- Traditional Chinese: 中西學院
- Simplified Chinese: 中西学院
- Hanyu Pinyin: Zhōngxī Xuéyuàn
- Literal meaning: Chinese-Western Academy
Transcriptions
Standard Mandarin
- Hanyu Pinyin: Zhōngxī Xuéyuàn

Tiong Se Academy (Note: Tiong Se Academy was known as: Anglo-Chinese School (小呂宋華僑中西學堂; later 後改為馬尼拉華僑中西學校; abbreviation ACS); First Chinese Elementary School (華僑第一小學校); Philippine Tiong Se Academy (菲律濱中西學院; abbreviation PTSA))(simplified Chinese: 中西学院; traditional Chinese: 中西學院; pinyin: Zhōngxī Xuéyuàn; Pe̍h-ōe-jī: Tiong-se Ha̍k-īⁿ; abbreviation TSA) is a Chinese private school situated along Santa Elena Street in Binondo, Manila.

Established on April 15, 1899 as the Anglo-Chinese School, TSA is considered as the first Chinese school in the Philippines.

== History ==
Tiong Se Academy was established as the "Anglo Chinese School" on by Engracio Guinco Palanca (Tan Kang), the first Chinese consul to the Philippines. Tankang solicited funds from the Chinese community in the Philippines for the school's foundation. Established on April 15, 1899, it first held classes at the backyard of the Imperial Chinese Consulate-General. This is considered as the first Chinese school in the archipelago as the Spanish banned private Chinese education.

The school moved to San Fernando Street, San Nicolas in 1899; to Salazar Street, Binondo in 1909, then Sacristía Street (modern Ongpin), Binondo in 1910, and finally to Santa Elena Street, Binondo in 1912.

The school was closed in 1942 following the Japanese occupation of the Philippines during World War II and was opened again in 1945.

Due to the Filipinization of foreign schools in the country in the 1970s, the school's name was changed to "Tiong Se Academy" on February 24, 1975. This was derived from the Hokkien language transcription of "Anglo Chinese School".

== Heritage recognition ==
The National Historical Commission of the Philippines as stated in a historical marker installed on June 14, 2013 credits the school as a model for educational institutions for Chinese and Filipino-Chinese people.

== See also ==
- List of Chinese schools in the Philippines

== Gallery ==
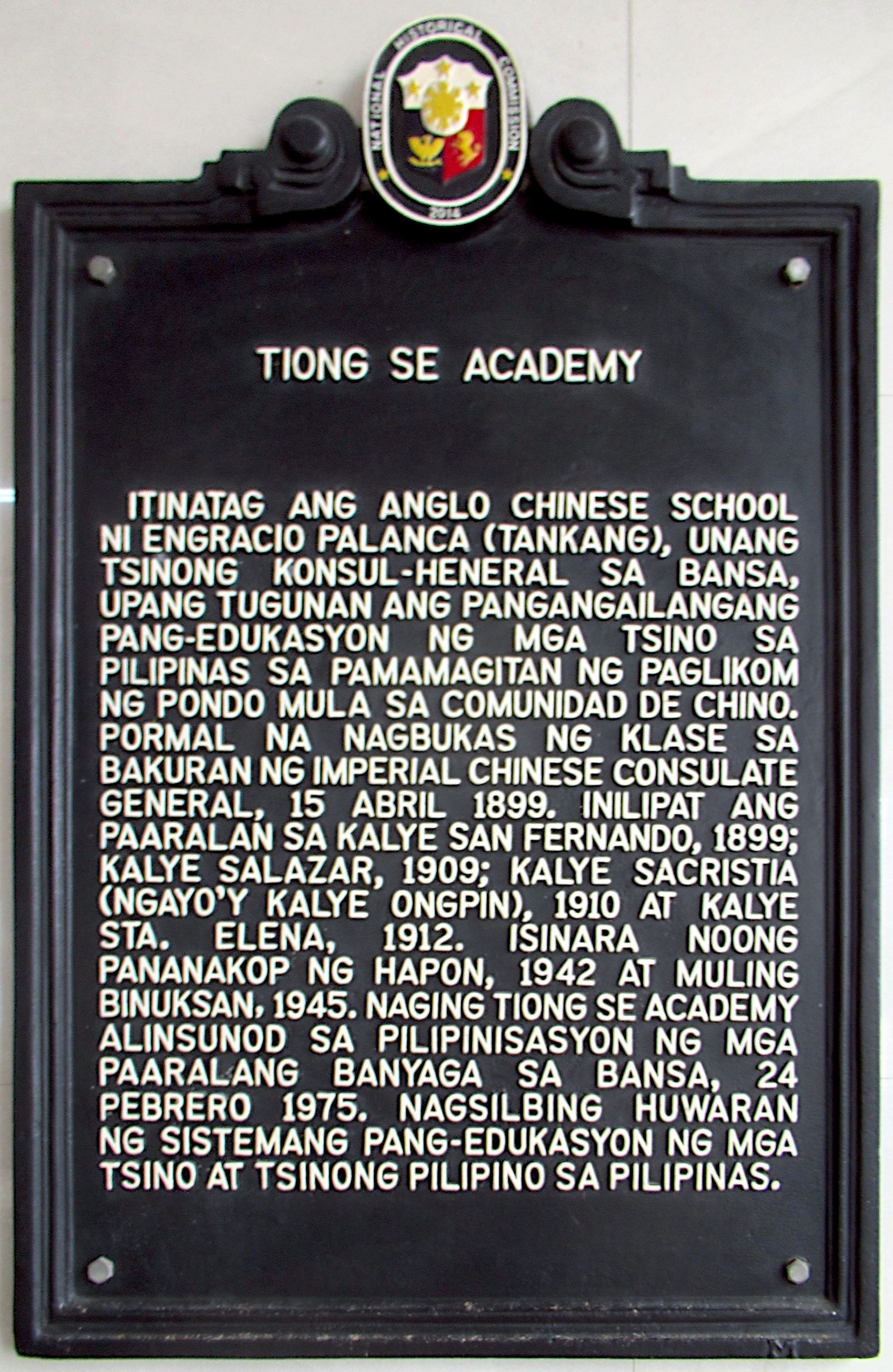
Historical marker

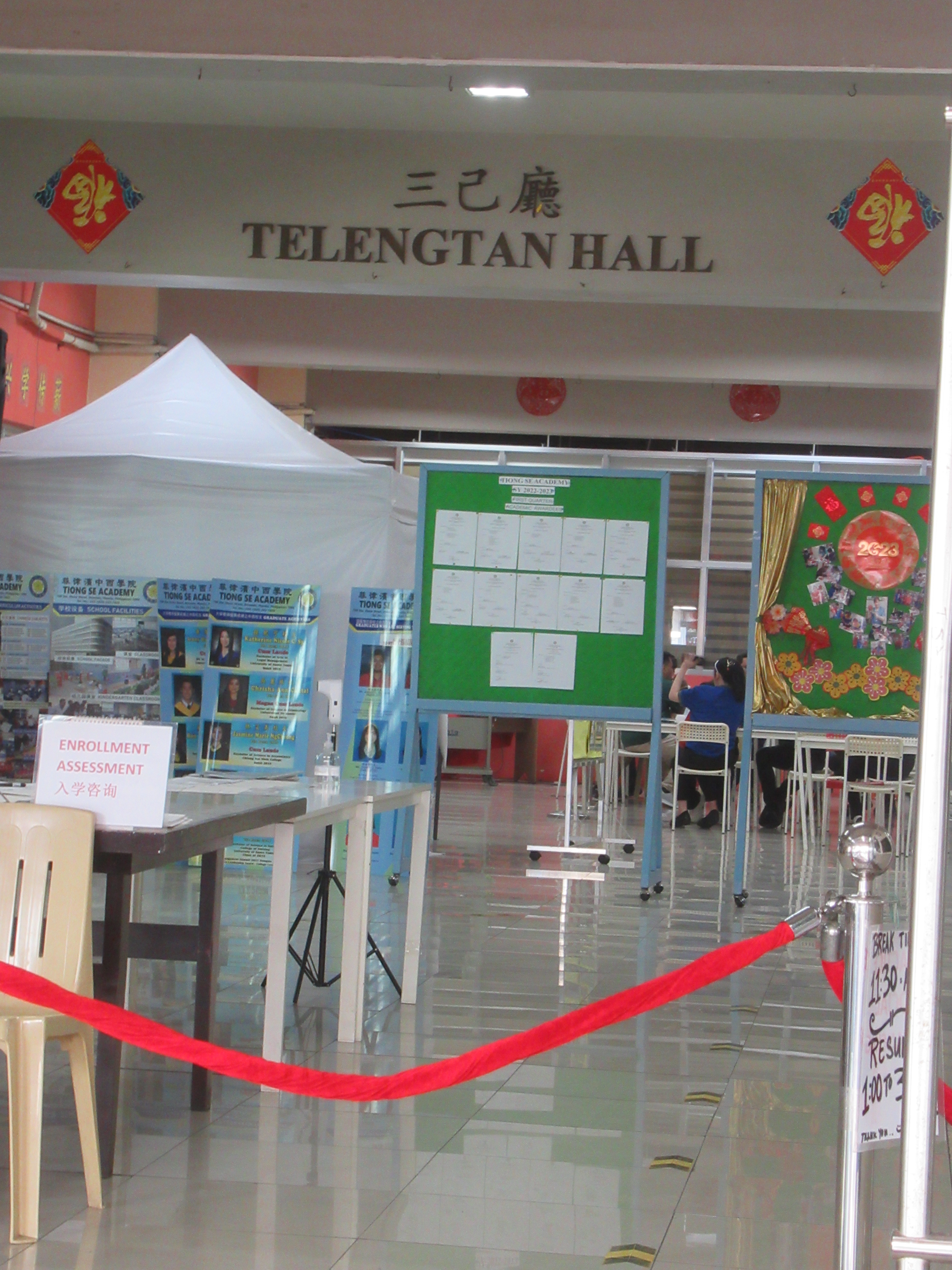
Telentan Hall

== Notes ==
| Preceded by First | Oldest Chinese School in the Philippines; April 15, 1899 | Succeeded by Hua Siong College of Iloilo; February 25, 1912 |
