= Outline of the Philippines =

Country in Southeast Asia

The flag of the Philippines

The coat of arms of the Philippines

The location of the Philippines

The following outline is provided as an overview of and topical guide to the Philippines:

Philippines – archipelagic country in Southeast Asia. In the western Pacific Ocean, it consists of 7,641 islands which are broadly categorized in three main geographical divisions from north to south: Luzon, Visayas, and Mindanao. The Philippines is bounded by the South China Sea to the west, the Philippine Sea to the east, and the Celebes Sea to the south. It shares maritime borders with Taiwan to the north, Japan to the northeast, Palau to the east and southeast, Indonesia to the south, Malaysia to the southwest, Vietnam to the west, and China to the northwest.

== General reference ==
An enlargeable basic map of the Philippines

- Pronunciation: /ˈfɪləpiːnz/
- Abbreviations: PH or PHL
- Common English country name: Philippines, the Philippines
- Official English country name: Republic of the Philippines
- Common endonyms: Philippines, Pilipinas, Pinas (informal)
- Official endonym: Republic of the Philippines, Republika ng Pilipinas
- Common exonyms: the Philippines, the Philippine Islands (archaic)
- Adjectivals: Philippine, Filipino
- Demonyms: Filipino (masculine or neutral; among others), Filipina (feminine)
- Etymology: named after Philip II of Spain
- International rankings of the Philippines
- ISO country codes: PH, PHL, 608
- ISO region codes: See ISO 3166-2:PH
- Internet country code top-level domain: .ph

== Geography of the Philippines ==
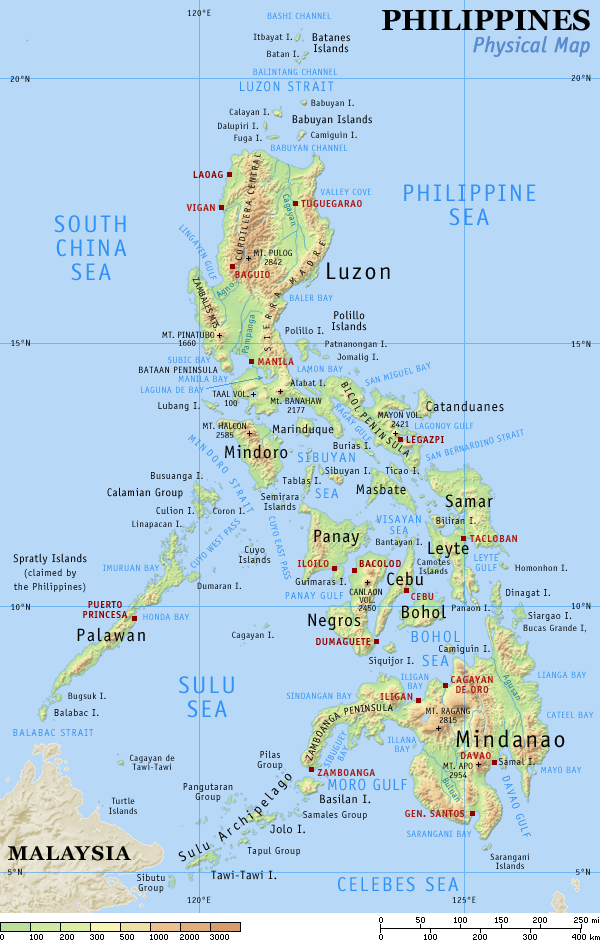
An enlargeable topographic map of the Philippines

- The Philippines is: an archipelagic megadiverse island country
- Location:
  - Northern Hemisphere and Eastern Hemisphere
    - Eurasia
      - Asia
        - Southeast Asia
          - Maritime Southeast Asia
  - Time zone: Philippine Standard Time (UTC+08)
  - Extreme points of the Philippines
    - North: Mavulis (Y'Ami) Island, Itbayat, Batanes 21°7′18.41″N 121°56′48.79″E
    - South: Frances Reef, Sitangkai, Tawi-Tawi 4°24′53.84″N 119°14′50.71″E
    - East: Pusan Point, Caraga, Davao Oriental 7°17′19.80″N 126°36′18.16″E
    - West: Balabac Great Reef, Balabac, Palawan 7°54′36.35″N 116°53′16.64″E
      - Subject to territorial dispute: Pag-asa Island, Kalayaan, Palawan 11°3′N 114°17′E
    - High: Mount Apo 2,954 m (9,692 ft)
    - Low: Philippine Sea and South China Sea 0 m (0 ft)
  - Land boundaries: none
- Coastline: 36,289 km (22,549 mi) – 5th longest coastline
- Population: 109,035,343 (2020 census) 12th most populous country
- Area: 300,000 km^{2} (120,000 sq mi) – 72nd most extensive country
- Atlas of the Philippines
- Cities in the Philippines by population

=== Environment of the Philippines ===
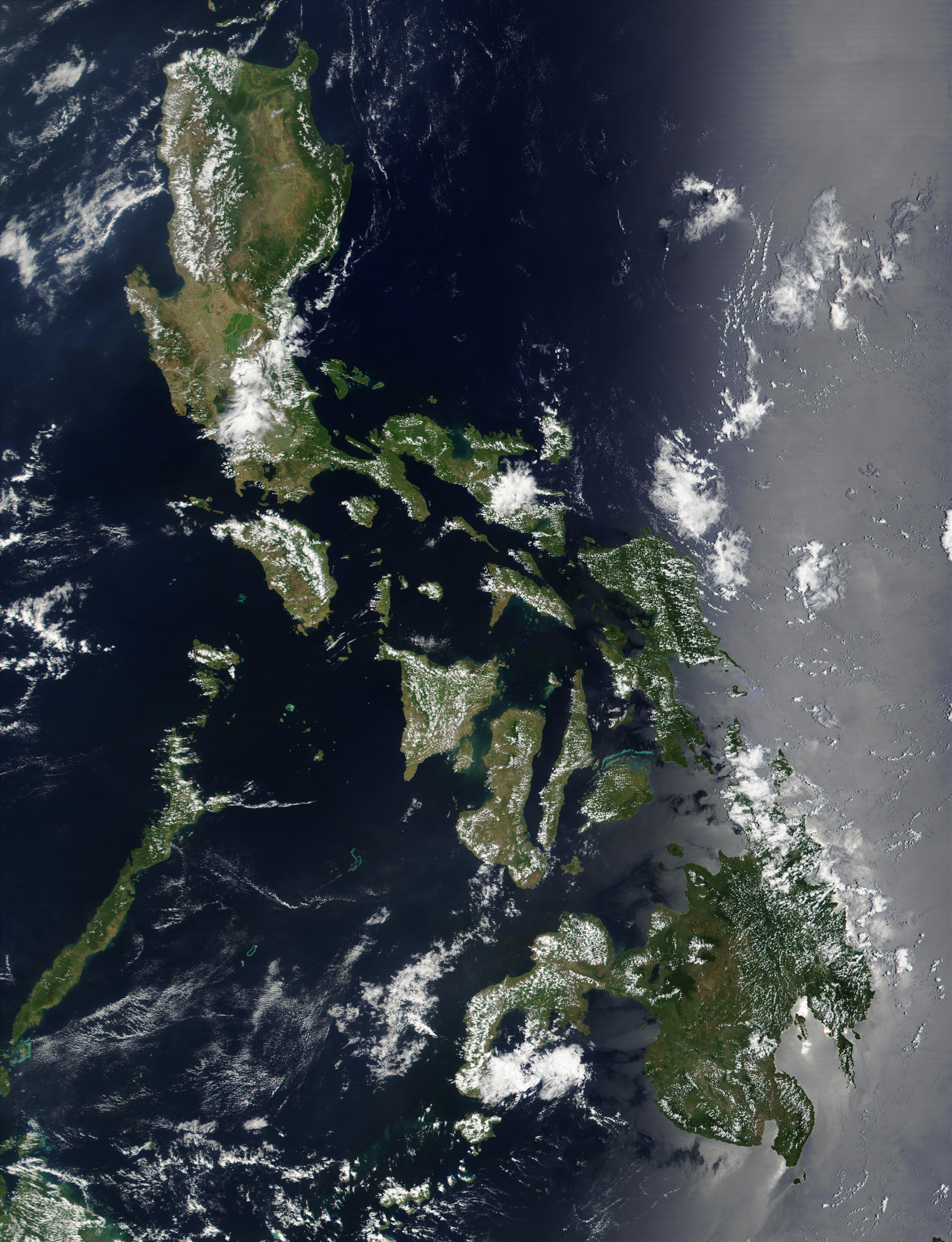
An enlargeable satellite image of the Philippines

- Beaches of the Philippines
- Climate of the Philippines
- Environmental issues in the Philippines
- Ecoregions in the Philippines
- Renewable energy in the Philippines
- Geology of the Philippines
- Headlands of the Philippines
- National Parks of the Philippines
- Protected areas of the Philippines
- Wildlife of the Philippines
  - Flora of the Philippines
  - Fauna of the Philippines
    - Birds of the Philippines
      - List of endemic birds of the Philippines
    - Mammals of the Philippines
    - List of endangered species of the Philippines

==== Geographic features of the Philippines ====
- Bays of the Philippines
- Islands of the Philippines
- Island groups of the Philippines
- Lakes in the Philippines
  - Laguna de Bay
  - Lake Bato
  - Lake Buluan
  - Lake Lanao
  - Lake Lumao
  - Lake Mainit
  - Naujan Lake
  - Taal Lake
- Mountains of the Philippines
  - Chocolate Hills
  - Cordillera Central
  - Mount Apo
  - Mount Arayat
  - Mount Banahaw
  - Mount Halcon
  - Mount Hibok-Hibok
  - Mount Iriga
  - Mount Isarog
  - Mount Madja-as
  - Mount Makiling
  - Mount Malepunyo
  - Mount Pinatubo
  - Mount Pulag
  - Mount Sembrano
  - Sierra Madre Mountains
  - Zambales Mountains
  - Volcanoes of the Philippines
    - Active volcanoes in the Philippines
    - Potentially active volcanoes in the Philippines
    - Inactive volcanoes in the Philippines
- Rivers of the Philippines
  - Agno River
  - Agusan River
  - Angat River
  - Bicol River
  - Cagayan River
  - Marikina River
  - Pampanga River
  - Pasig River
  - Sibagat River
  - Wawa River
- Waterfalls of the Philippines
- World Heritage Sites in the Philippines
- Peninsulas of the Philippines

=== Island groups of the Philippines ===
- Luzon
- Visayas
- Mindanao

=== Administrative divisions of the Philippines ===
An enlargeable administrative map of the Philippines

==== Regions of the Philippines ====
- Bangsamoro Autonomous Region in Muslim Mindanao
- Bicol Region
- Cagayan Valley
- Calabarzon
- Caraga
- Central Luzon
- Central Visayas
- Cordillera Administrative Region
- Davao Region
- Eastern Visayas
- Ilocos Region
- Mimaropa
- National Capital Region
- Negros Island Region
- Northern Mindanao
- Soccsksargen
- Western Visayas
- Zamboanga Peninsula

==== Provinces of the Philippines ====
- Abra
- Agusan del Norte
- Agusan del Sur
- Aklan
- Albay
- Antique
- Apayao
- Aurora
- Basilan
- Bataan
- Batanes
- Batangas
- Benguet
- Biliran
- Bohol
- Bukidnon
- Bulacan
- Cagayan
- Camarines Norte
- Camarines Sur
- Camiguin
- Capiz
- Catanduanes
- Cavite
- Cebu
- Cotabato
- Davao de Oro
- Davao del Norte
- Davao del Sur
- Davao Occidental
- Davao Oriental
- Dinagat Islands
- Eastern Samar
- Guimaras
- Ifugao
- Ilocos Norte
- Ilocos Sur
- Iloilo
- Isabela
- Kalinga
- La Union
- Laguna
- Lanao del Norte
- Lanao del Sur
- Leyte
- Maguindanao del Norte
- Maguindanao del Sur
- Marinduque
- Masbate
- Misamis Occidental
- Misamis Oriental
- Mountain Province
- Negros Occidental
- Negros Oriental
- Northern Samar
- Nueva Ecija
- Nueva Vizcaya
- Occidental Mindoro
- Oriental Mindoro
- Palawan
- Pampanga
- Pangasinan
- Quezon
- Quirino
- Rizal
- Romblon
- Samar
- Sarangani
- Siquijor
- Sorsogon
- South Cotabato
- Southern Leyte
- Sultan Kudarat
- Sulu
- Surigao del Norte
- Surigao del Sur
- Tarlac
- Tawi-Tawi
- Zambales
- Zamboanga del Norte
- Zamboanga del Sur
- Zamboanga Sibugay

==== Cities of the Philippines ====
- Alaminos
- Angeles
- Antipolo
- Bacolod
- Bacoor
- Bago
- Baguio
- Bais
- Balanga
- Batac
- Batangas City
- Bayawan
- Baybay
- Bayugan
- Biñan
- Bislig
- Bogo
- Borongan
- Butuan
- Cabadbaran
- Cabanatuan
- Cabuyao
- Cadiz
- Cagayan de Oro
- Calaca
- Calamba
- Calapan
- Calbayog
- Caloocan
- Candon
- Canlaon
- Carcar
- Carmona
- Catbalogan
- Cauayan
- Cavite City
- Cebu City
- Cotabato City
- Dagupan
- Danao
- Dapitan
- Dasmariñas
- Davao City
- Digos
- Dipolog
- Dumaguete
- El Salvador
- Escalante
- Gapan
- General Santos
- General Trias
- Gingoog
- Guihulngan
- Himamaylan
- Iligan
- Iloilo City
- Imus
- Iriga
- Isabela
- Kabankalan
- Kidapawan
- Koronadal
- La Carlota
- Lamitan
- Laoag
- Lapu-Lapu
- Las Piñas
- Legazpi
- Ligao
- Lipa
- Lucena
- Maasin
- Mabalacat
- Makati
- Malabon
- Malaybalay
- Malolos
- Mati
- Mandaluyong
- Mandaue
- Manila
- Marawi
- Marikina
- Masbate City
- Meycauayan
- Muñoz
- Muntinlupa
- Naga, Camarines Sur
- Naga, Cebu
- Navotas
- Olongapo
- Ormoc
- Oroquieta
- Ozamiz
- Pagadian
- Palayan
- Panabo
- Parañaque
- Pasay
- Pasig
- Passi
- Puerto Princesa
- Quezon City
- Roxas
- Sagay
- Samal
- San Carlos, Negros Occidental
- San Carlos, Pangasinan
- San Fernando, La Union
- San Fernando, Pampanga
- San Jose
- San Jose del Monte
- San Juan
- San Pablo
- San Pedro
- Santa Rosa
- Santiago
- Santo Tomas
- Silay
- Sipalay
- Sorsogon City
- Surigao City
- Tabaco
- Tacloban
- Tacurong
- Tagaytay
- Tagbilaran
- Taguig
- Tagum
- Talisay, Cebu
- Talisay, Negros Occidental
- Tanauan
- Tandag
- Tangub
- Tanjay
- Tarlac City
- Tayabas
- Toledo
- Trece Martires
- Tuguegarao
- Urdaneta
- Valencia
- Valenzuela
- Victorias
- Vigan
- Zamboanga City

== History of the Philippines ==
=== Period-coverage ===
- Prehistory of the Philippines
- Pre-colonial period
- Spanish colonial period
- American colonial period
- Post-colonial period
- Martial law era
- Contemporary period

=== Presidents of the Philippines ===
- Emilio Aguinaldo: 1899–1901
- Manuel L. Quezon: 1935–1944
- Jose P. Laurel: 1943–1945
- Sergio Osmeña: 1944–1946
- Manuel Roxas: 1946–1948
- Elpidio Quirino: 1948–1953
- Ramon Magsaysay: 1953–1957
- Carlos P. Garcia: 1957–1961
- Diosdado Macapagal: 1961–1965
- Ferdinand Marcos: 1965–1986
- Corazon Aquino: 1986–1992
- Fidel V. Ramos: 1992–1998
- Joseph Estrada: 1998–2001
- Gloria Macapagal Arroyo: 2001–2010
- Benigno Aquino III: 2010–2016
- Rodrigo Duterte: 2016–2022
- Bongbong Marcos: 2022–present

== Government and politics of the Philippines ==
- Form of government: Unitary presidential constitutional republic
- Capital of the Philippines: Manila (Note: While Manila proper is designated as the nation's capital, the whole of Metro Manila is designated as the National Capital Region (NCR), and the seat of government, hence the name of a region. Many national government institutions aside from Malacañang Palace and some agencies/institutions are located within the NCR.)
- Flag of the Philippines
- Political parties in the Philippines
- Elections in the Philippines
- List of political parties in the Philippines
  - Lakas–Christian Muslim Democrats (Lakas–CMD)
  - Laban ng Demokratikong Pilipino (LDP)
  - Liberal Party
  - Nacionalista Party
  - Nationalist People's Coalition
  - National Unity Party (NUP)
  - Partido Demokratiko Pilipino–Lakas ng Bayan (PDP–Laban)
  - Pwersa ng Masang Pilipino (PMP)
  - United Nationalist Alliance (UNA)

=== National government of the Philippines ===
- Constitution of the Philippines

==== Legislative branch ====
- Congress of the Philippines
  - Senate of the Philippines
    - President of the Senate of the Philippines
    - President pro tempore of the Senate of the Philippines
  - House of Representatives of the Philippines
    - Speaker of the House of Representatives of the Philippines

==== Executive branch ====
The Malacañang Palace

- Head of state and head of government: President of the Philippines, Bongbong Marcos (17th)
  - Vice President of the Philippines: Sara Duterte (15th)

===== Executive departments =====
- Department of Agrarian Reform
- Department of Agriculture
- Department of Budget and Management
- Department of Education
- Department of Energy
- Department of Environment and Natural Resources
- Department of Finance
- Department of Foreign Affairs
- Department of Health
- Department of Human Settlements and Urban Development
- Department of Information and Communications Technology
- Department of Justice
- Department of Labor and Employment
- Department of Migrant Workers
- Department of National Defense
- Department of Public Works and Highways
- Department of Science and Technology
- Department of Social Welfare and Development
- Department of the Interior and Local Government
- Department of Tourism
- Department of Trade and Industry
- Department of Transportation

===== Commissions =====
- Civil Service Commission
- Commission on Appointments
- Commission on Audit
- Commission on Elections
- Commission on Filipino Migrant Workers
- Commission on Filipinos Overseas
- Commission on Higher Education
- Commission on Human Rights
- Constitutional Commission
- Consultative Commission on Charter Change
- Komisyon sa Wikang Filipino
- National Commission for Culture and the Arts
- National Commission on Indigenous Peoples
- National Historical Commission of the Philippines
- National Telecommunications Commission
- National Youth Commission
- Philippine Commission for the Urban Poor
- Philippine Commission on Justice and Peace
- Philippine Insurance Commission
- Philippine Sports Commission
- Population Commission
- Professional Regulation Commission
- Securities and Exchange Commission

==== Judicial branch ====
- Supreme Court of the Philippines
  - Chief Justice of the Supreme Court of the Philippines
  - Associate Justice of the Supreme Court of the Philippines
- Court of Appeals
- Court of Tax Appeals
- Katarungang Pambarangay
- Ombudsman of the Philippines
- Regional Trial Courts
- Sandiganbayan

=== Foreign relations of the Philippines ===
- Diplomatic missions in the Philippines
- Diplomatic missions of the Philippines

=== Military of the Philippines ===
- Air Force of the Philippines
- Army of the Philippines
- Coast Guard of the Philippines
- Marine Corps of the Philippines
- Navy of the Philippines

=== Intelligence agencies ===
- National Bureau of Investigation
- National Counter-Terrorism Action Group
- National Intelligence Coordinating Agency
- Philippine Drug Enforcement Agency

== Law of the Philippines ==
- Adoption in the Philippines
- Cannabis in the Philippines
- Capital punishment in the Philippines
- Census in the Philippines
- Censorship in the Philippines
- Child-related laws
  - Child pornography laws in the Philippines
- Constitution of the Philippines
  - Separation of church and state in the Philippines
- Copyright law in the Philippines
- Crime in the Philippines (Revised Penal Code)
  - Rape in the Philippines
- Human rights in the Philippines
  - Abortion in the Philippines
  - Censorship in the Philippines
  - Freedom of association in the Philippines
  - Freedom of religion in the Philippines
  - Freedom of speech in the Philippines
  - Freedom of the press in the Philippines
  - Gambling in the Philippines
  - LGBT rights in the Philippines
  - Marriage and union in the Philippines
    - Marriage in the Philippines
      - Divorce in the Philippines
      - Same-sex marriage in the Philippines
  - Prostitution in the Philippines
  - Right to keep and bear arms
    - Gun law in the Philippines
  - Smoking in the Philippines
- Law enforcement in the Philippines
- Local ordinance
- Speed limits in the Philippines
- Taxation in the Philippines

== Culture of the Philippines ==
- Architecture of the Philippines
  - Ancestral houses of the Philippines
  - Heritage houses of the Philippines
- Cuisine of the Philippines
  - List of Philippine dishes
  - List of Philippine desserts
  - Philippine condiments
  - Filipino Chinese cuisine
  - Filipino-American cuisine
- Charities in the Philippines
- Ethnic groups in the Philippines
  - Indigenous peoples of the Philippines
- Spanish influence on Filipino culture
- Festivals in the Philippines
- Historical markers of the Philippines
- Media in the Philippines
- Museums in the Philippines
- Mythology of the Philippines
  - Mythical creatures in the Philippines
- National symbols of the Philippines
  - Coat of arms of the Philippines
  - Flag of the Philippines
  - National anthem of the Philippines
- Public holidays in the Philippines
- Filipino Psychology
  - Filipino Value system
- Records of the Philippines
- Religion in the Philippines
- List of World Heritage Sites in the Philippines
- Lists of cultural properties of the Philippines

=== Art in the Philippines ===
- Art Deco theaters of the Philippines
- Cinema of the Philippines
- Dance in the Philippines
- Fashion and clothing in the Philippines
- Literature of the Philippines
  - Philippine literature in English
  - Philippine literature in Spanish
- Mass Media in the Philippines
  - Television in the Philippines
- National Artist of the Philippines

==== Music of the Philippines ====
- Folk music of the Philippines
- Philippine-based music groups

=== Languages of the Philippines ===
- Philippine English
- Spanish language in the Philippines
  - Philippine Spanish
- Philippine Sign Language
- Acronyms in the Philippines

=== Sports in the Philippines ===
- Baseball in the Philippines
  - Baseball Philippines
  - Philippine national baseball team
- Basketball in the Philippines
  - Maharlika Pilipinas Basketball League
  - Metropolitan Basketball Association
  - National Basketball Conference
  - Philippine Basketball Association
  - Philippine Basketball League
  - Philippine men's national basketball team
  - Philippine women's national basketball team
  - Samahang Basketbol ng Pilipinas
  - United Regional Basketball League
- Boxing in the Philippines
  - Amateur Boxing Association of the Philippines (ABAP)
- Football in the Philippines
  - Philippine Football Federation
  - Philippine national football team
  - Philippine national football team (women)
- Filipino Martial Arts
- Philippines at the Olympics
  - Philippine Olympic Committee
- Rugby in the Philippines
  - Philippine national rugby union team
- Filipino Traditional games
- Other
  - Eskrima or Escrima
  - Mano Mano
  - National Collegiate Athletic Association
  - Palarong Pambansa
  - Panantukan
  - National Athletic Association of Schools, Colleges and Universities
  - Philippine Sports Association for the Differently Abled—National Paralympic Committee of the Philippines
  - Philippine Sports Commission
  - Triathlon Association of the Philippines
  - University Athletic Association of the Philippines

== Education in the Philippines ==
- Science and technology in the Philippines

== Economy and infrastructure of the Philippines ==
- Economic rank, by nominal GDP (2007): 46th (forty-sixth)
- Agriculture in the Philippines
- Banking in the Philippines
  - Central Bank of the Philippines
- Companies of the Philippines
- Currency of Philippines: Peso *
  - ISO 4217: PHP
  - Philippine peso bills
- Fiscal policy of the Philippines
- Mining in the Philippines
- Botanical gardens and arboretums in the Philippines
- Shopping malls in the Philippines
- Philippine Government Securities
- Philippine Stock Exchange
- Taxation in the Philippines
  - Revenue stamps of the Philippines
- Tourism in the Philippines
- Water supply and sanitation in the Philippines

=== Energy in the Philippines ===
- Electricity distribution
  - National Power Corporation
- Energy policy of the Philippines
- Oil industry in the Philippines
- Power plants in the Philippines
  - Nuclear energy in the Philippines
  - Geothermal power in the Philippines
  - Wind power in the Philippines

=== Transportation in the Philippines ===
- Airports in the Philippines
- Lighthouses in the Philippines
- Rail transportation in the Philippines
- Vehicular transport in the Philippines
  - Road system in the Philippines
    - Philippine expressway network
    - Philippine highway network
  - Vehicles in the Philippines
    - Bus companies of the Philippines
    - Cars of the Philippines
      - Jeepney
    - Philippine vehicle license plates

== See also ==
- List of international rankings
- Member states of the Association of Southeast Asian Nations
- Member states of the Latin Union
- Member states of the United Nations
- Outline of Asia
- Outline of geography
- Outline of Metro Manila
