= List of acronyms in the Philippines =

This is a list of acronyms in the Philippines. They are widely used in different sectors of Philippine society. Often acronyms are utilized to shorten the name of an institution or a company.

== Churches and Religious Institutions ==
- ACJC – Apostolic Church of Jesus Christ
- CCF — Christ's Commission Fellowship
- IEMELIF — Iglesia Evangelica Metodista en las Islas Filipinas (Evangelical Methodist Church in the Philippine Islands)
- IFI – Iglesia Filipina Independiente
- INC – Iglesia ni Cristo
- JIL – Jesus Is Lord Church Worldwide
- JIOSWM – Jesus Is Our Shield Worldwide Ministries (Oras ng Himala)
- JMC – Jesus Miracle Crusade
- KJC – Kingdom of Jesus Christ
- LAMP – Lighthouse Apostolic Ministry of Pentecost
- MCGI – Members Church of God International
- PMCC (4th Watch) – Pentecostal Missionary Church of Christ (4th Watch)
- UPC – United Pentecostal Church
- UCCP – United Church of Christ in the Philippines
- CBCP – Catholic Bishops' Conference of the Philippines

== Geography ==
- ALMASOR – Albay, Masbate, Sorsogon
- BAG – Baguio
- BARMM – Bangsamoro Autonomous Region in Muslim Mindanao
- BUDA – Bukidnon-Davao
- BXU – Butuan
- Calabarzon – Region; Cavite, Laguna, Batangas, Rizal, Quezon
- CAMANAVA – Caloocan, Malabon, Navotas, Valenzuela (northwestern Metro Manila)
- CAR – Cordillera Administrative Region
- CSR – Camarines Sur
- CEB – Cebu, either the province or the city
- CDO – Cagayan de Oro, Northern Mindanao
- COB – City of Balanga
- CSFP – City of San Fernando, Pampanga
- DVO – Davao, either the region or the city
- EDSA – Epifanio de los Santos Avenue, a major circumferential road (C-4) in Metro Manila
- IGaCoS – Island Garden City of Samal
- ILO – Iloilo, either the province or the city
- LB – Los Baños, Laguna
- LP – Las Piñas
- LeySam – Leyte and Samar
- Luzviminda – Luzon, Visayas, Mindanao
- MARILAQUE – Manila, Rizal, Laguna, Quezon
- Mimaropa – Region; Mindoro (Occidental & Oriental), Marinduque, Romblon, Palawan
- MisOcc – Misamis Occidental
- MisOr – Misamis Oriental
- MUNTAPAT – Muntinlupa, Taguig, Pateros
- MUNTIPARLAS – Muntinlupa, Parañaque, Las Piñas (southern Metro Manila)
- NC – Naga City
- NCR – National Capital Region (Metro Manila)
- NIR – Negros Island Region
  - BCD – Bacolod
  - DGT – Dumaguete
  - NegOcc – Negros Occidental
  - NegOr – Negros Oriental
- QC – Quezon City
- Soccsksargen – Region; South Cotabato, Cotabato, Sultan Kudarat, Sarangani, General Santos
  - GenSan – General Santos
- VisMin – Visayas, Mindanao
- ZC – Zamboanga City

== Political parties ==
- 1-Cebu – One Cebu Party
- AKB — Ako Bicol
- Akbayan – Akbayan Citizens' Action Party
- AKP – Ang Kapatiran Party
- Aksyon – Aksyon Demokratiko
- Al Ittahad-UKB – Al Ittahad-UKB Party
- APP – Aggrupation of Parties for Prosperity
- AZP – Adelante Zamboanga Party
- Bagumbayan–VNP – Bagumbayan–Volunteers for a New Philippines
- BAKUD – Barug Alang sa Kauswagan ug Demokrasya
- BALANE – Bagong Lakas ng Nueva Ecija
- BAPA – Bangsamoro Party
- BARUG – Partido Barug
- BOPK – Bando Osmena - Pundok Kauswagan
- BP – Bangon Pilipinas
- BPP – Bukidnon Paglaum Party, Bangsamoro People's Party
- BUP – Basilan Unity Party
- DPP – Democratic Party of the Philippines
- HNP – Hugpong ng Pagbabago
- HTL – Hugpong sa Tawong Lungsod
- KANP – Katipunan ng Nagkakaisang Pilipino
- KDP – Katipunan ng Demokratikong Pilipino
- KBL – Kilusang Bagong Lipunan
- KKK – Kapayapaan, Kaunlaran at Katarungan
- KTPNAN – Katipunan ng Kamalayang Kayumanggi
- KUSUG – Kugi Uswag Sugbo
- Lakas–CMD – Lakas–Christian Muslim Democrats
- LDP – Laban ng Demokratikong Pilipino
- LP – Liberal Party
- MAKABAYAN – Makabayang Koalisyon ng Mamamayan
- NCP – Nationalist Citizens' Party
- NP – Nacionalista Party
- NPC – Nationalist People's Coalition
- NUP – National Unity Party
- PANAGHIUSA – Partido Panaghiusa
- PAZ – Partido Prosperidad y Amor Para na Zamboanga
- PCM – People's Champ Movement
- PDDS – Pederalismo ng Dugong Dakilang Samahan
- PDP – Partido Demokratiko Pilipino
- PDR/Reporma – Partido para sa Demokratikong Reporma
- PDSP – Partido Demokratikong Sosyalista ng Pilipinas
- PFP – Partido Federal ng Pilipinas
- PLM – Partido Lakas ng Masa
- PMP – Pwersa ng Masang Pilipino
- PPP – Partido Pilipino sa Pagbabago, Partidong Pagbabago ng Palawan
- PROMDI – Probinsya Muna Development Initiative
- PRP – People's Reform Party
- RP – Reform Party
- Reform PH – Reform PH - People's Party
- SARRO – Sarangani Reconciliation and Reformation Organization
- SIAP – Serbisyong Inklusibo-Alyansang Progresibo
- STAND-UP – Student Alliance for the Advancement of Democratic Rights in UP
- SZP – Sulong Zambales Party
- TOP – Tawi-Tawi One Party
- UBJP – United Bangsamoro Justice Party
- UBP – United Benguet Party
- UNIDO – United Nationalist Democratic Organization
- UNA – United Nationalist Alliance
- UNEGA – United Negros Alliance
- UP Alyansa – UP Alyansa ng mga Mag-aaral para sa Panlipunang Katwiran at Kaunlaran
- WPP – Workers and Peasants Party

== Companies and commerce ==
- AKELCO – Aklan Electric Cooperative
- BATELEC – Batangas Electric Cooperative
- BDO – Banco de Oro
- BSP – Bangko Sentral ng Pilipinas
- China Bank – China Banking Corporation
- CEPALCO – Cagayan Electric Power & Light Company
- ETT – Enlightened Touch Trading
- iBank – International Exchange Bank
- LEYECO – Leyte Electric Cooperative
- LPCCI – Las Piñas Chamber of Commerce and Industry
- Meralco – Manila Electric Railway Company
- Metrobank – Metropolitan Bank and Trust Company
- MORE – MORE Electric and Power Corporation
- NAPOCOR/NPC – National Power Corporation
- NGCP - National Grid Corporation of the Philippines
- PAL – Philippine Airlines
- PANTELCO – Panay Telephone Corporation
- PBB – Philippine Business Bank
- PBCom – Philippine Bank of Communications
- Philtranco – Philippine Transportation Corporation
- Philtrust Bank – Philippine Trust Company
- PLDT – Philippine Long Distance Telephone Company
- PMFTC – Philip Morris Fortune Tobacco Corporation
- PNB – Philippine National Bank
- PECO – Panay Electric Company
- PSBank – Philippine Savings Bank
- REBISCO – Republic Biscuit Corporation
- RFM – RFM Corporation
- SMC – San Miguel Corporation
- TRANSCO – National Transmission Corporation
- VECO – Visayan Electric Company

== Educational institutions ==
- ADC – Academia de Davao College
- ADDU – Ateneo de Davao University
- AdI–SMCS – Ateneo de Iloilo – Santa Maria Catholic School
- ADMU – Ateneo de Manila University
- ADNU – Ateneo de Naga University
- ADU – Adamson University
- ADZU – Ateneo de Zamboanga University
- AMACLC – AMA Computer Learning Center
- AMACU – AMA Computer University
- AmBriMed – American British Medical Skills Institution
- AU – Arellano University
- AUP - Adventist University of the Philippines
- BatStateU – Batangas State University
- BHNHS – Batasan Hills National High School
- BU – Bicol University
- BulSU – Bulacan State University
- BCC – Binangonan Catholic College
- CC-OC – Columban College, Inc. Olongapo City
- CDGC – Child Development and Guidance Center
- CDW – College of Divine Wisdom
- CIS – Cebu International School
- CIT-U – Cebu Institute of Technology – University
- CMU – Central Mindanao University
- CPU – Central Philippine University
- CSCJ – Colegio del Sagrado Corazon de Jesus
- CSJL – Colegio de San Juan de Letran
- CUP – City University of Pasay
- CvSU – Cavite State University
- DBC – Don Bosco College, Canlubang
- DBTC – Don Bosco Technical College
- DBTI – Don Bosco Technical Institute, Makati
- DCenHS – Davao Central High School
- DCHS – Davao Christian High School
- DCNHS – Davao City National High School
- DLSU – De La Salle University
- DLS-CSB – De La Salle College of Saint Benilde
- DRANHS – Daniel R. Aguinaldo High School
- DWU – Divine Word University
- EDSCI – Escuela De Sophia of Caloocan, Inc.
- ESEP – Engineering and Science Education Program
- EVSU – Eastern Visayas State University
- FAST – Filipino-American School Town
- FEU-FERN – Far Eastern University - Nicanor Reyes Educational Foundation
- FS – Falcon School
- HSCI – Hua Siong College of Iloilo
- IDC – Iloilo Doctors' College
- INHS – Iloilo National High School
- ISAT-U – Iloilo Science and Technology University
- JBLFMU – John B. Lacson Foundation Maritime University
- JNHS – Jaro National Highschool
- JES1 – Jaro 1 Elementary School
- JMC – Jose Maria College
- JRU – Jose Rizal University
- LNU – Leyte Normal University
- LPU – Lyceum of the Philippines University
- LSPU – Laguna State Polytechnic University
- MMFC – Mindanao Medical Foundation College
- MONSAY – Ramon Magsaysay High School
- NCST – National College of Science and Technology
- NCBA – National College of Business and Arts
- NDDU – Notre Dame of Dadiangas University
- NEU – New Era University
- NEUST – Nueva Ecija University of Science and Technology
- Pisay – Philippine Science High School
- PLM – Pamantasan ng Lungsod ng Maynila
- PLV – Pamantasan ng Lungsod ng Valenzuela
- PLMUN – Pamantasan ng Lungsod ng Muntinlupa
- PNC – Pamantasan ng Cabuyao
- PNHS – Plaridel National High School
- PCC – Philippine Cultural College
- PUP – Polytechnic University of the Philippines
- RCC – Republic Central Colleges
- RSHS – Regional Science High School
- SCC – St. Clare College of Caloocan
- SCS – South Crest School
- SIC – Santa Isabel College
- SLU – Saint Louis University
- SMCM – St. Mary's College of Meycauayan
- SMCQC – Saint Mary's College of Quezon City
- SPC – St. Paul College (Makati, Pasig, Parañaque)
- SPUI – St. Paul University Iloilo
- STEFTI – St. Therese Educational Foundation of Tacloban, Inc.
- TAU - Tarlac Agricultural University
- TCU – Taguig City University
- TSU – Tarlac State University
- TUP – Technological University of the Philippines
- TIP – Technological Institute of the Philippines
- UE – University of the East
- UI – University of Iloilo
- UdM – Universidad de Manila
- UM – University of Mindanao, University of Manila
- UNEP – University of Northeastern Philippines
- UP – University of the Philippines
- UPLB – University of the Philippines, Los Baños
- UPHS-D – University of Perpetual Help System – Dalta
- UPHS-J – University of Perpetual Help System – Jonelta
- UP-Cebu – University of the Philippines Cebu
- UPV – University of the Philippines Visayas
- UPVTC – University of the Philippines Visayas Tacloban College
- URS – University of Rizal System
- USA – University of San Agustin
- USANT – University of Saint Anthony
- USC – University of San Carlos
- USPF – University of Southern Philippines Foundation
- USeP – University of Southeastern Philippines
- USI – Universidad de Sta. Isabel
- UST – University of Santo Tomas
- UV – University of the Visayas
- VMUF – Virgen Milagrosa University Foundation
- WIT – Western Institute of Technology
- WMSU – Western Mindanao State University
- WVSU – West Visayas State University
- XU – Xavier University – Ateneo de Cagayan
- ZMC - Zamora Memorial College

== Other ==
- ABC – Aliw Broadcasting Corporation
- ABS-CBN – Alto Broadcasting System – Chronicle Broadcasting Network
- AMBS – Advanced Media Broadcasting System
- AP – Araling Panlipunan
- APT — Antonio P. Tuviera; APT Entertainment
- BAYAN – Bagong Alyansang Makabayan
- BIFF – Bangsamoro Islamic Freedom Fighters
- BLISS – Bagong Lipunan Improvement of Sites and Services
- BSP – Boy Scouts of the Philippines
- CPP-NPA-NDF – Communist Party of the Philippines-New People's Army-National Democratic Front
- EK – Enchanted Kingdom
- FMR – Favorite Music Radio
- G Sat – Global Satellite
- GMA – Greater Manila Area; Global Media Arts
- GSP – Girl Scouts of the Philippines
- HUKBALAHAP – Hukbo ng Bayan Laban sa Hapon (People's Army Against the Japanese)
- IBC – Intercontinental Broadcasting Corporation
- KMU – Kilusang Mayo Uno
- LENTE – Legal Network for Truthful Elections
- LFS — League of Filipino Students
- MBA – Metropolitan Basketball Association
- MBC – Manila Broadcasting Company; Makati Business Club, Inc.
- MILF – Moro Islamic Liberation Front
- MNLF – Moro National Liberation Front
- MOA – Mall of Asia
- MOR – My Only Radio
- MPBL – Maharlika Pilipinas Basketball League
- NAMFREL – National Citizens' Movement for Free Elections
- NBL-Pilipinas – National Basketball League (Philippines)
- PBA – Philippine Basketball Association
- PBB – Pinoy Big Brother
- PBO – Pinoy Box Office
- PBL – Philippine Basketball League
- PBS – Presidential Broadcast Service
- PCAP – Professional Chess Association of the Philippines
- PFL – Philippines Football League
- PKP-1930 – Partido Komunista ng Pilipinas-1930
- PPCRV – Parish Pastoral Council for Responsible Voting
- PSL – Philippine Superliga; Pilipinas Super League
- PTV – People's Television Network
- PVL – Premier Volleyball League
- PCAC – Presidential Complaints and Action Committee
- PEFTOK – Philippine Expeditionary Forces to Korea
- RPA-ABB – Revolutionary Proletarian Army–Alex Boncayao Brigade
- RMN – Radio Mindanao Network
- RPN – Radio Philippines Network
- SBN – Southern Broadcasting Network
- SSL – Shakey's Super League
- SPARK - Samahan ng Progresibong Kabataan
- TAPE – Television and Production Exponents, Inc.
- TV5 – TV5 Network, Inc.
- TVJ – Tito Sotto, Vic Sotto & Joey De Leon; TVJ Productions
- V-League – V-League (Philippines)
