= Davao Chinatown =

Neighborhood in Davao City, Philippines

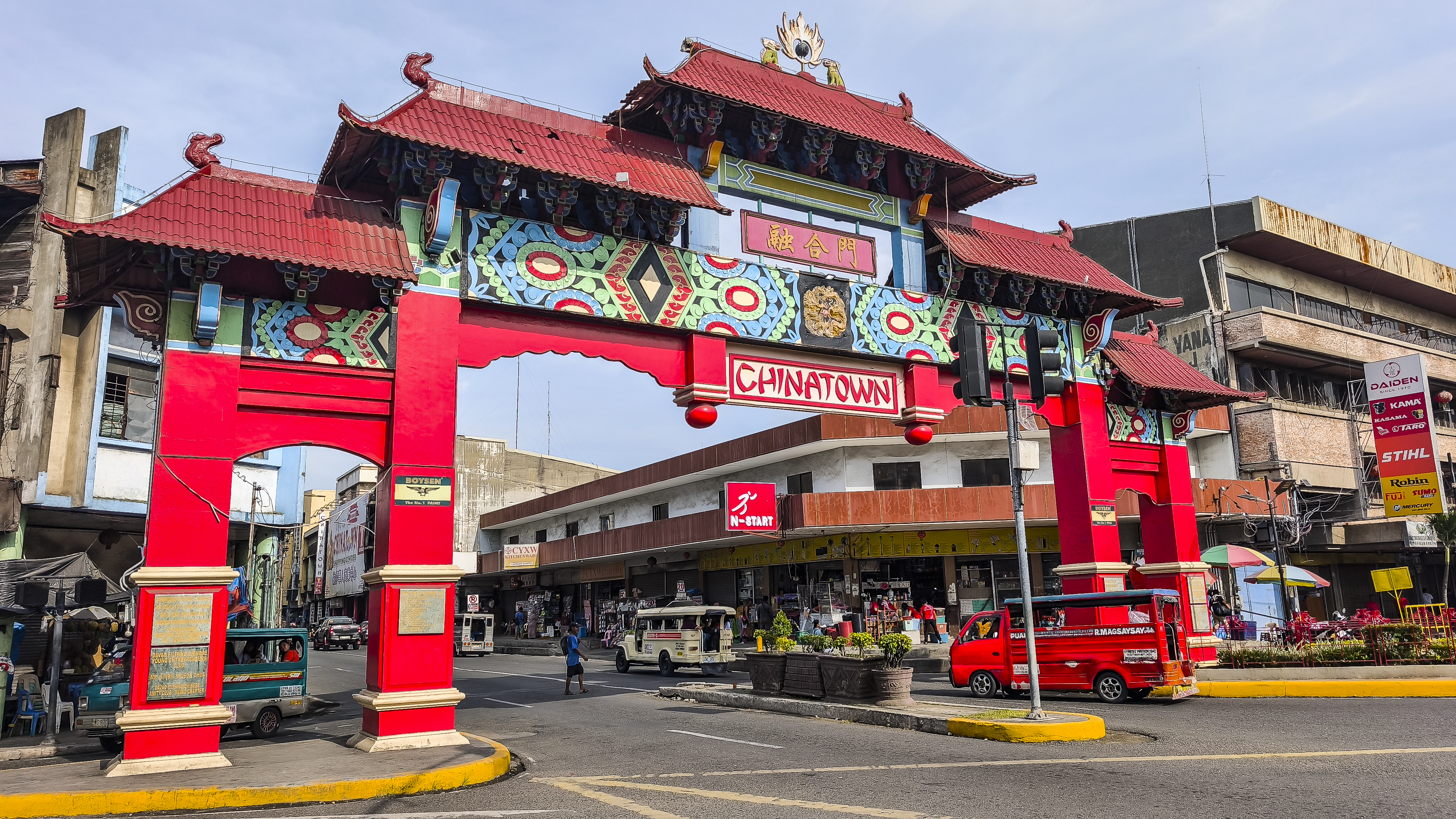
- The Unity Arch in Ramon Magsaysay Avenue. August 2026
- Country: Philippines
- Region: Davao Region
- City: Davao City
- Congressional District: 1st District of Davao City
- Districts: Poblacion; Agdao
- Barangays: 4
- Founded: 2003
- Founder: Davao City Chinatown Development Council

Area
  - Total: 0.44 km^{2} (0.17 sq mi)
- Time zone: UTC+08:00 (Philippine Standard Time)
- Zip codes: 8000
- Area codes: 8
- Languages: English; Mandarin; Cantonese; Hokkien; Tagalog; Cebuano

Davao Chinatown
- Traditional Chinese: 達沃唐人街
- Simplified Chinese: 达沃唐人街
Transcriptions
Standard Mandarin
- Hanyu Pinyin: Dáwò tángrénjiē

Davao China Streets
- Traditional Chinese: 納卯華人街
- Simplified Chinese: 纳卯华人街
Transcriptions
Standard Mandarin
- Hanyu Pinyin: Nàmǎo huárén jiē
Southern Min
- Hokkien POJ: La̍p-báu hôa-lâng ke

The Davao Chinatown, also known as Davao China Street, Davao City Chinatown, or Mindanao Chinatown (Cebuano: Lungsod Tsina sa Dabaw; Tagalog: Bayang Tsina ng Dabaw), is a Chinatown located in Davao City and the only one on Mindanao island in the Philippines. It is the primary residential and trading area of the Chinese-Filipino community in the city. The area is bordered by Santa Ana Avenue, Monteverde Avenue, Ramón Magsaysay Street, and León García Street. Dubbed as the Philippines' largest Chinatown, it has a total land area of 44 hectares, comprising four barangays.

== History ==
In 2003, the city's then mayor, Rodrigo Duterte, issued an executive order declaring portions of Barangays 27-C and 30-C, where Chinese-Filipino residences and businesses were concentrated, to be the city's Chinatown.

The Davao City Chinatown Development Council (DCCDC) was established to assist the conservation of the area's cultural heritage and the implementation of policies in that regard. It is also charged with the management of commerce in the area.

== Archways ==
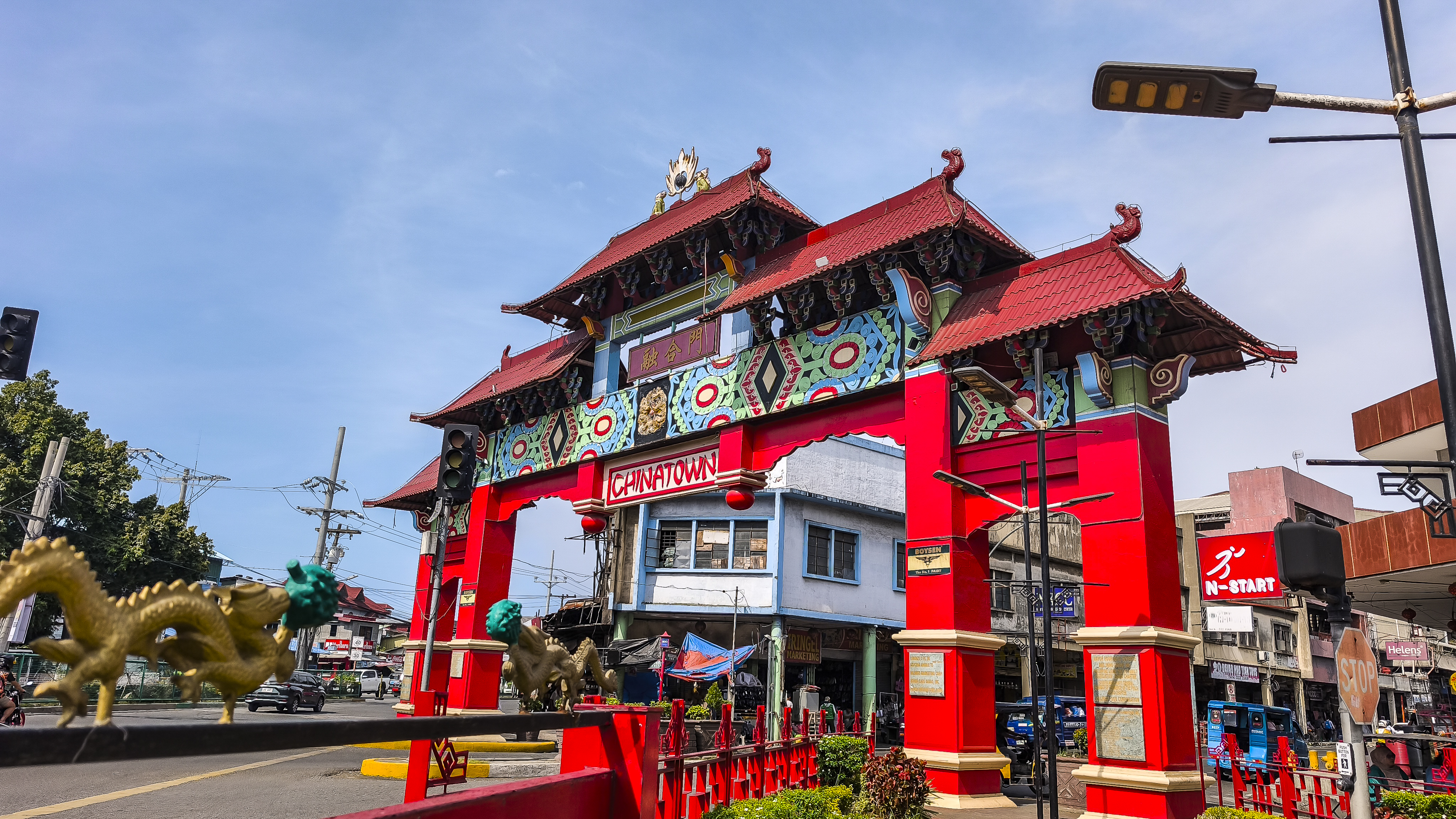
Unity Arch, August 2026

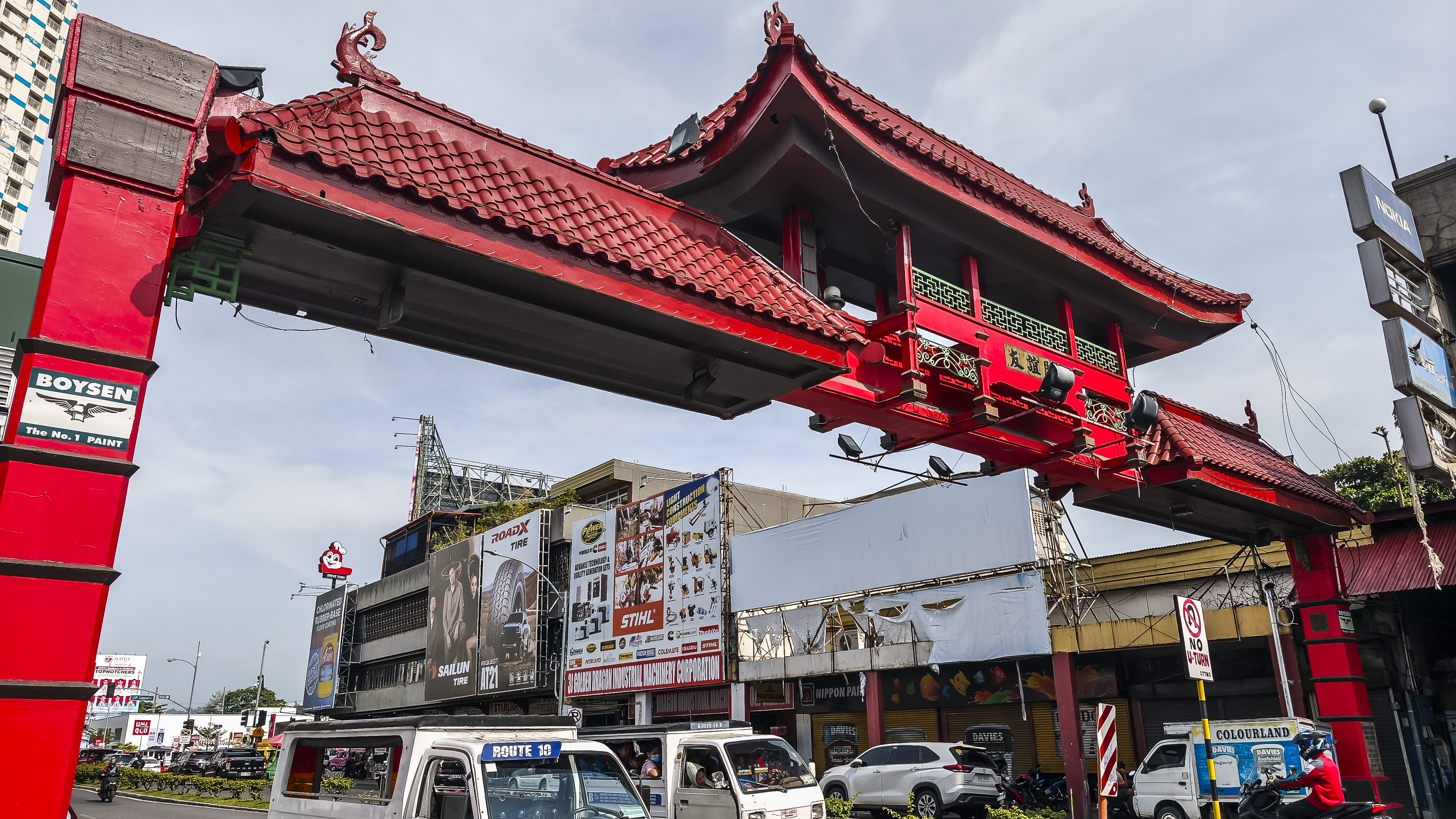
Friendship Arch, August 2026

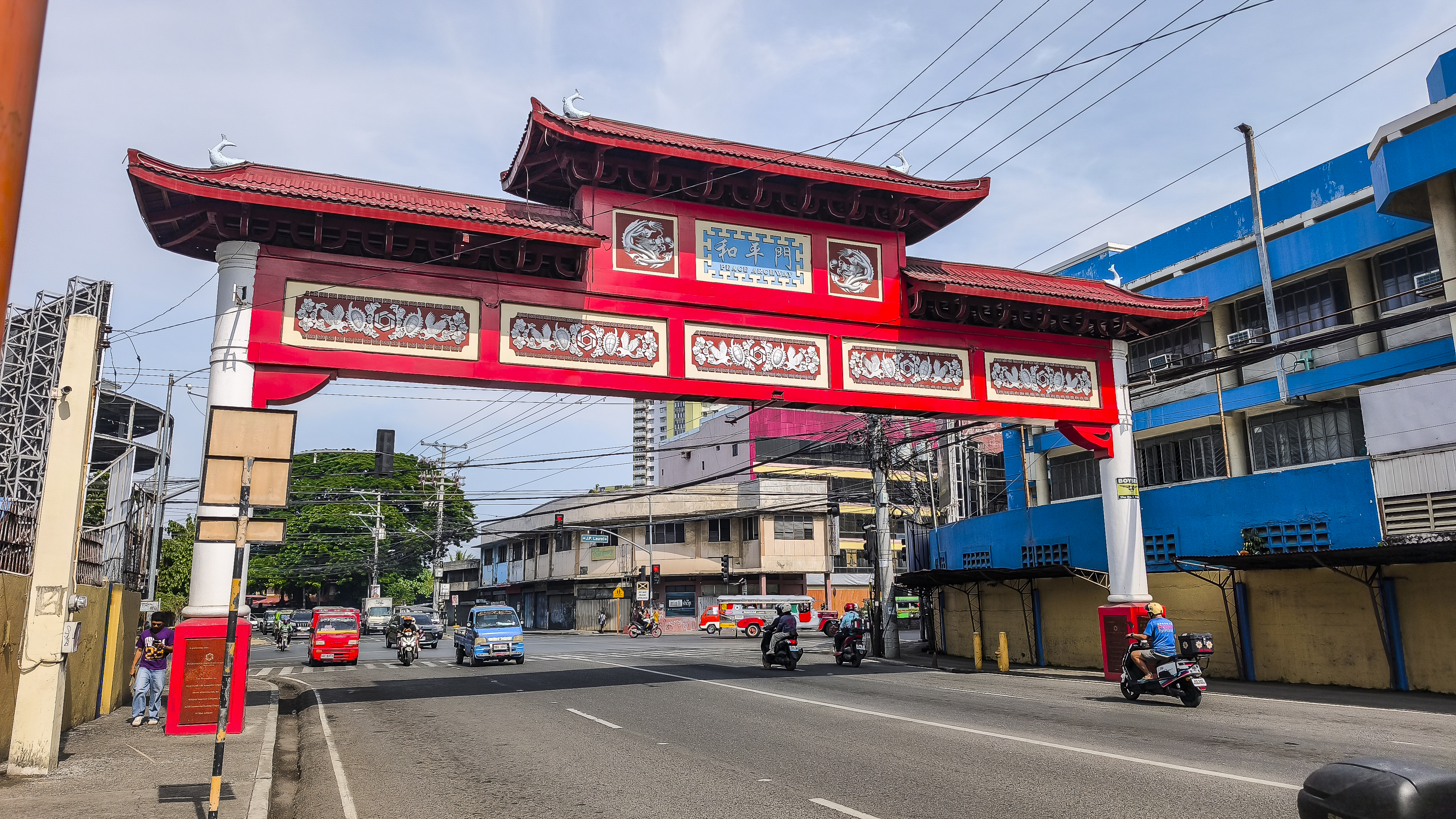
Peace Arch. August 2026

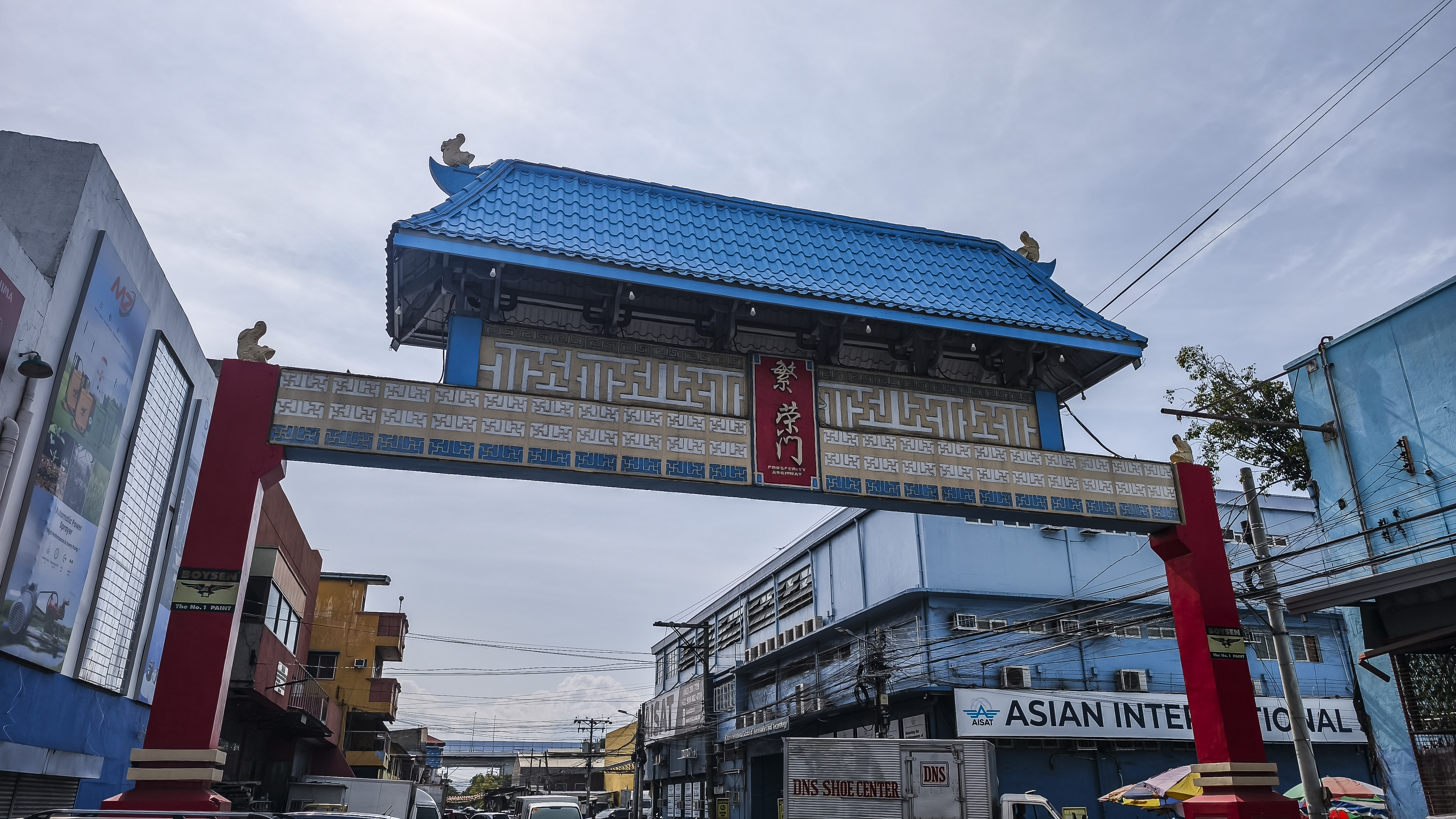
Prosperity Arch, August 2026

The Chinese gate archways are inspired by páilou (牌樓) or páifāng (牌坊), a traditional style of architectural arch in China. Archways also serves as main entry points, making them one of the main attractions, emphasising cultural significance and adding aesthetic value.

- Unity Arch: rónghé mén (融合門)—along Ramon Magsaysay Avenue, corner Alvarez Street, facing Quezon Boulevard Avenue;
- Friendship Arch: yǒuyì mén (友誼門)—along Ramon Magsaysay Avenue near Emilio Jacinto Street;
- Peace Arch: hépíng mén (和平門)—along Santa Ana Avenue, corner J. P. Laurel Avenue, right beside Davao Chong Hua High School;
- Prosperity Arch: fánróng mén (繁榮門)—along Santa Ana Avenue, corner Alvarez Street.

== Places of worship ==
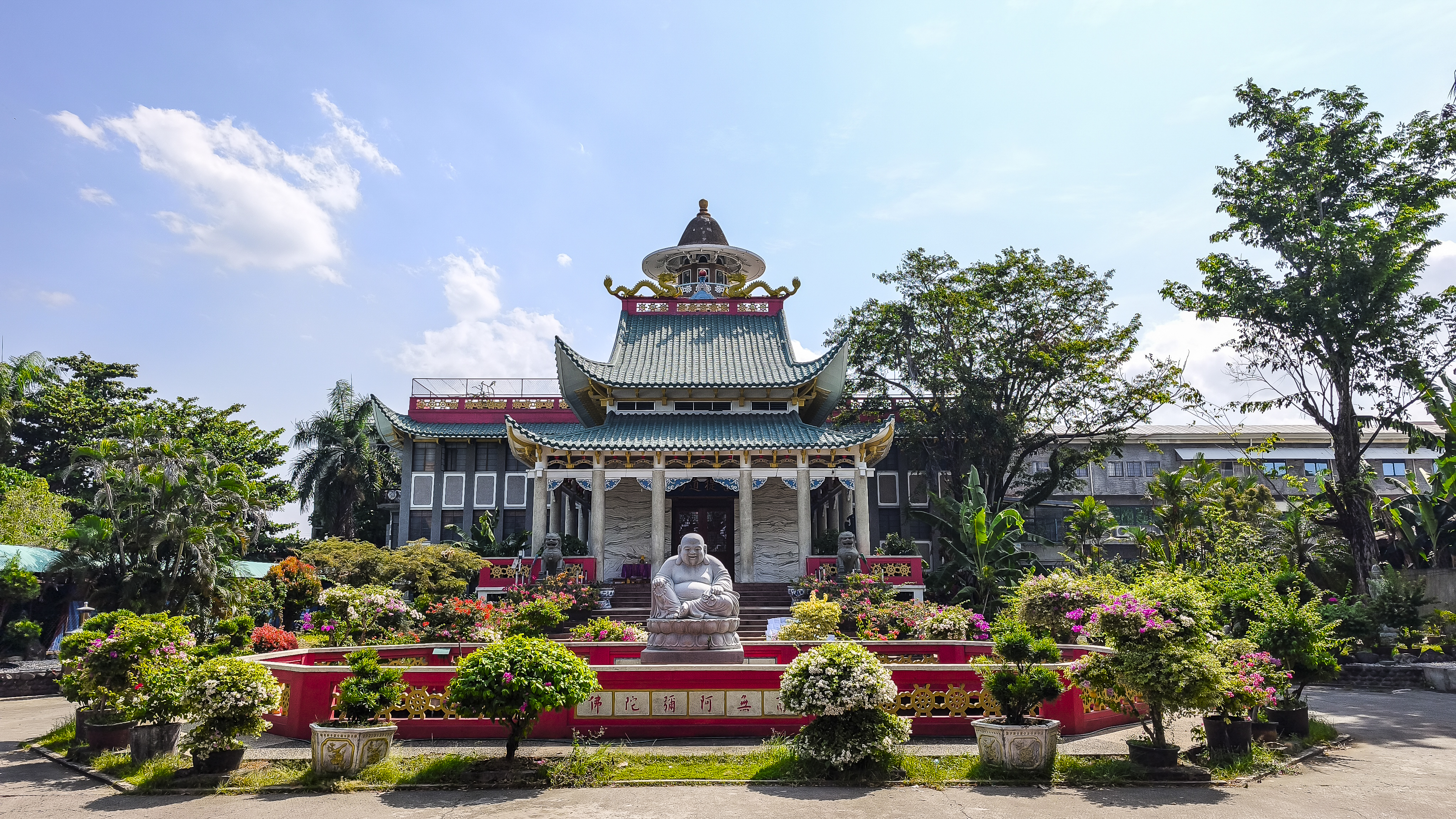
Long Hua Buddhist Temple, August 2026

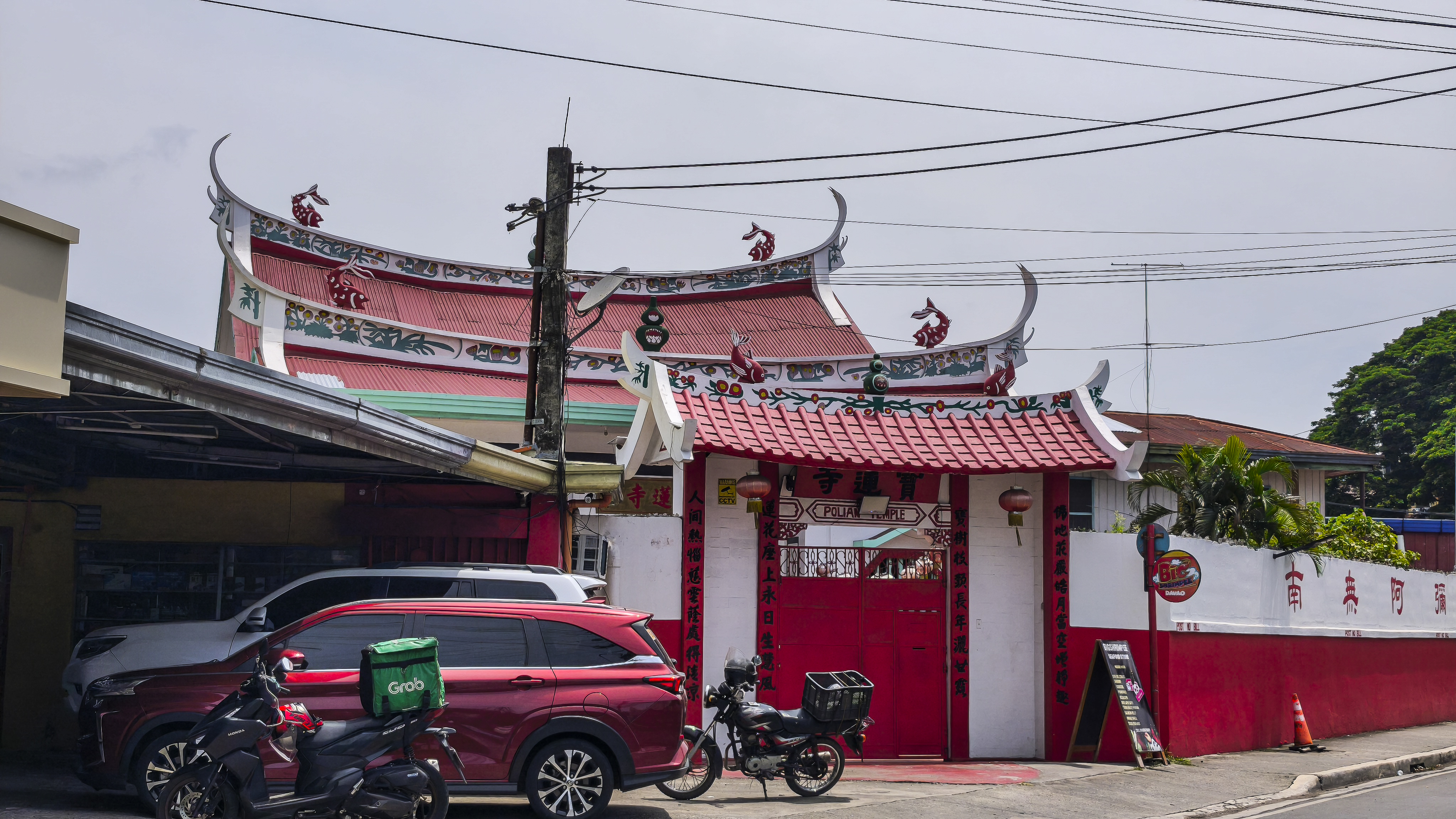
Polian Temple located in Quirino Avenue, Davao City

Faith and devotion have had a wide influence on moulding the country's culture and norms. Buddhist and Taoist temples define the rich cultural importance of the area. Additionally, Christian churches of different denominations are one of the city's destinations for devotees.

- Long Hua Buddhist Temple is the largest Buddhist temple on the island of Mindanao, it is located in J.P. Cabaguio Avenue, Agdao District. It is 3-4 kilometers northeast of the center of the city.
- Polian Temple is one of the oldest Buddhist Temples in Davao City, located in Quirino Avenue.
- Santiago Temple is situated on a property near Gaisano Mall of Davao. Built in 1957, it was once visible from J. P. Laurel Avenue, but a new building was built in front of it. Until now, it was hidden from direct view and accessible only by a narrow street alley.
- Mindanao Taoist Temple is located in Pearl Street, corner Emerald Street, RGA Village, J.P. Cabaguio Street, Agdao District.
- Davao Chinese Baptist Church, located in Guzman Street, Poblacion District, Davao City.
- Santa Ana Shrine Parish is a Catholic church located along Santa Ana Avenue, corner Lapu-Lapu Street.

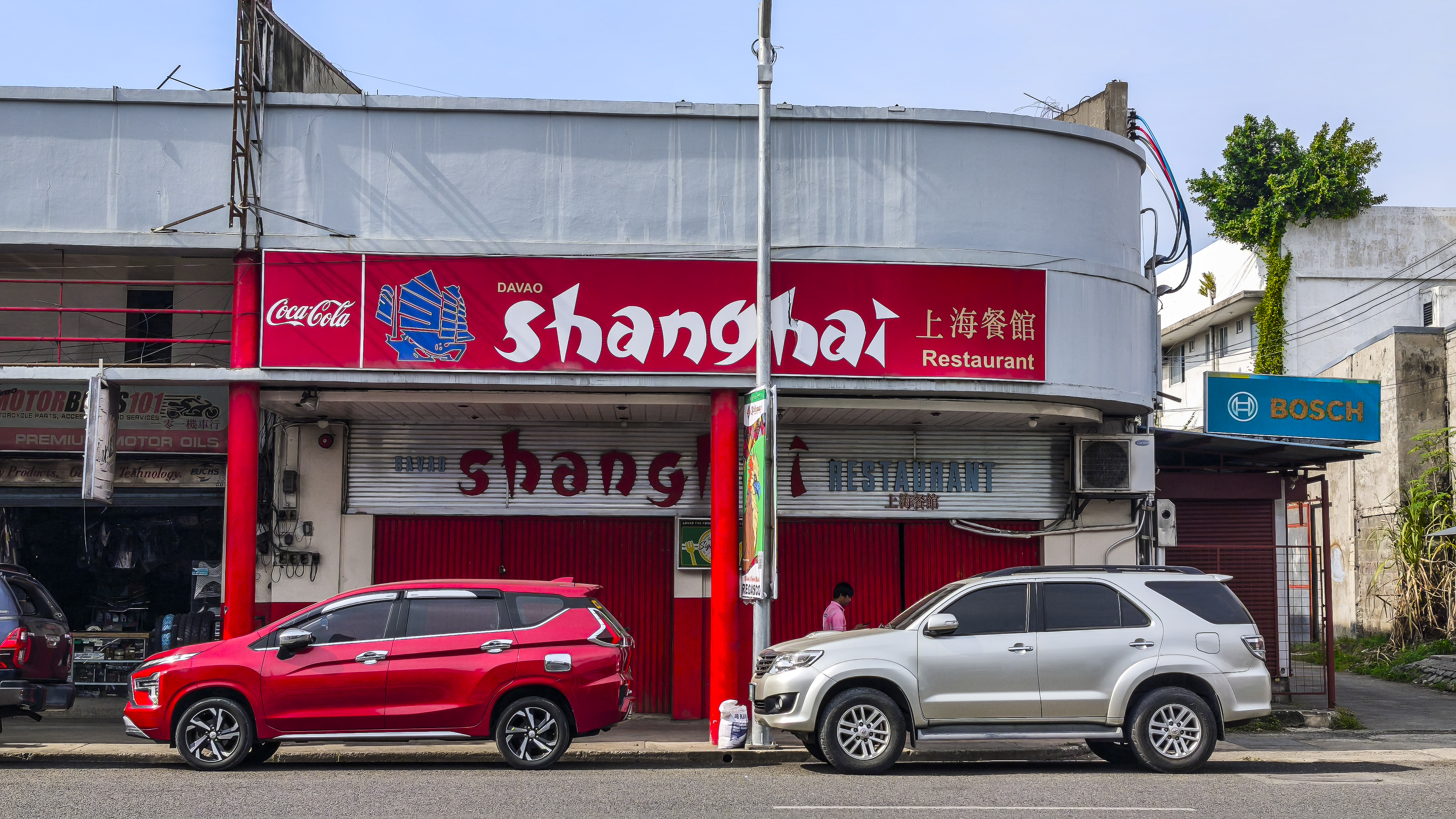
Davao Shanghai Restaurant, August 2026

== Business establishments ==
A wide array of shopping malls, hardware stores, restaurants, retail outlets, and wholesale shops are usually found on every street in the area. Most of them are owned by Chinese Filipino families, whose majority originated in Fujian, China. Since then, it has served as one of Davao City's primary trading centers. Various affordable commodities are sold, such as home and office furniture, electronic gadgets and appliances, bicycles, apparels, accessories, and many more. Foods, drinks, fruits, vegetables, and flowers are available on sidewalks and put up for sale at cheaper prices. Other products are also available and displayed in kiosks and stalls.

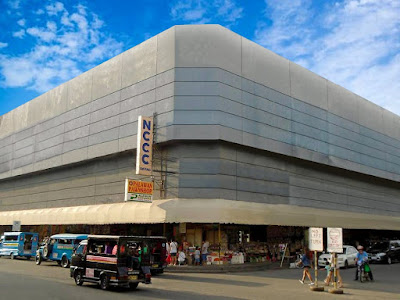
New City Commercial Corporation Main Magsaysay

- NCCC Main Magsaysay, founded by Lim Tian Su, started as a textile store in Davao City during the 1950s. The establishment subsequently became a general retail product shop, providing essentials as well as footwear and jewellery. They launched their initial NCCC supermarket and department store within Ramon Magsaysay Avenue around 1978, and they introduced the New City Commercial Center.
- DCLA Department Store, along Ramon Magsaysay Avenue, is located in a bustling part of the area. Davao City Los Amigos, which was started in 2003, is a shopping center offering wide choices of retail goods, including clothing, garments, footwear, electronic devices, and several others, at an inexpensive cost.
- New Davao Famous Restaurant, established in 1970s, has been serving contemporary Chinese cuisine with an extensive variety of dishes for more than 40 years.
- Davao Shanghai Restaurant, has been serving Chinese and Filipino snacks and dishes for a number of decades, the restaurant's signature taste has already been part of every Dabawenyos' palate on any occasions.

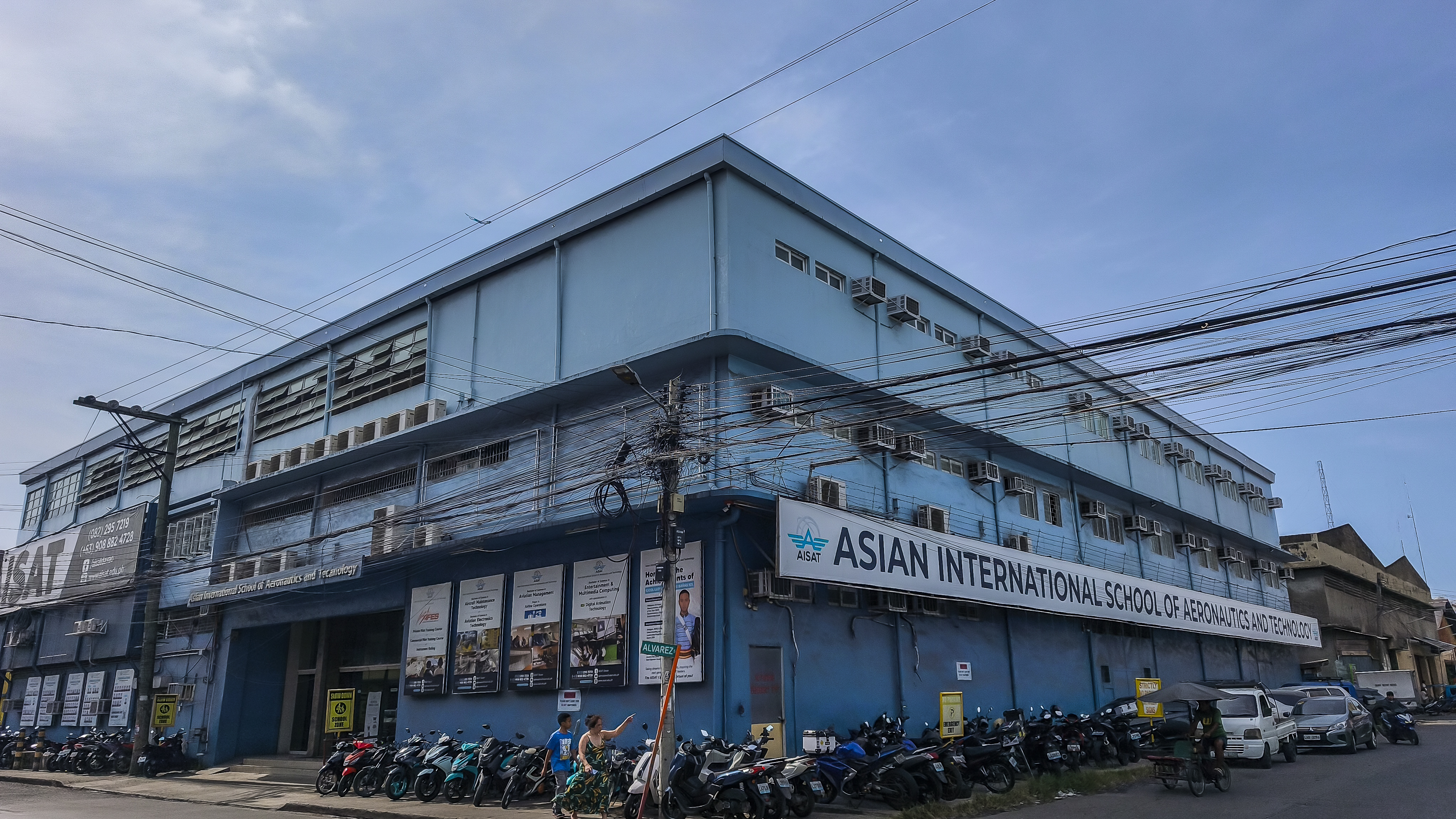
Asian International School Aeronautics and Technology, August 2026

== Academic institutions ==
Chinatown has been the home of learning institutions spanning from basic education programs to tertiary schools.

- Davao Chong Hua High School, is a non-sectarian private Chinese school. Located on Santa Ana Avenue, corner J. P. Laurel Street, which is known to be one of the nation's oldest Chinese schools. It was then established in 1924 and offers Chinese language arts and culture.
- Holy Cross of Davao College, situated along Santa Ana Avenue corner Guzman Street, is a Catholic Church private basic and higher education institution run by the Archdiocese of Davao. The college was founded in 1951 by the Congregation of the Religious of the Virgin Mary Sisters and then acquired by the Foreign Mission Society of Quebec (PME Fathers) in 1956.
- San Pedro College, erected along Guzman Street since 1956, is a private, Catholic, research, and coeducational basic and higher education institution run by the Dominican Sisters of the Trinity in Davao City.
- Asian International School Aeronautics and Technology, known as AISAT, established in Santa Ana Avenue, corner Leon Garcia Street, was initially founded in 2011 by an association of entrepreneurs and technical professionals who recognised a demand for outstanding aviation industry education in Davao City.

== Transportation ==
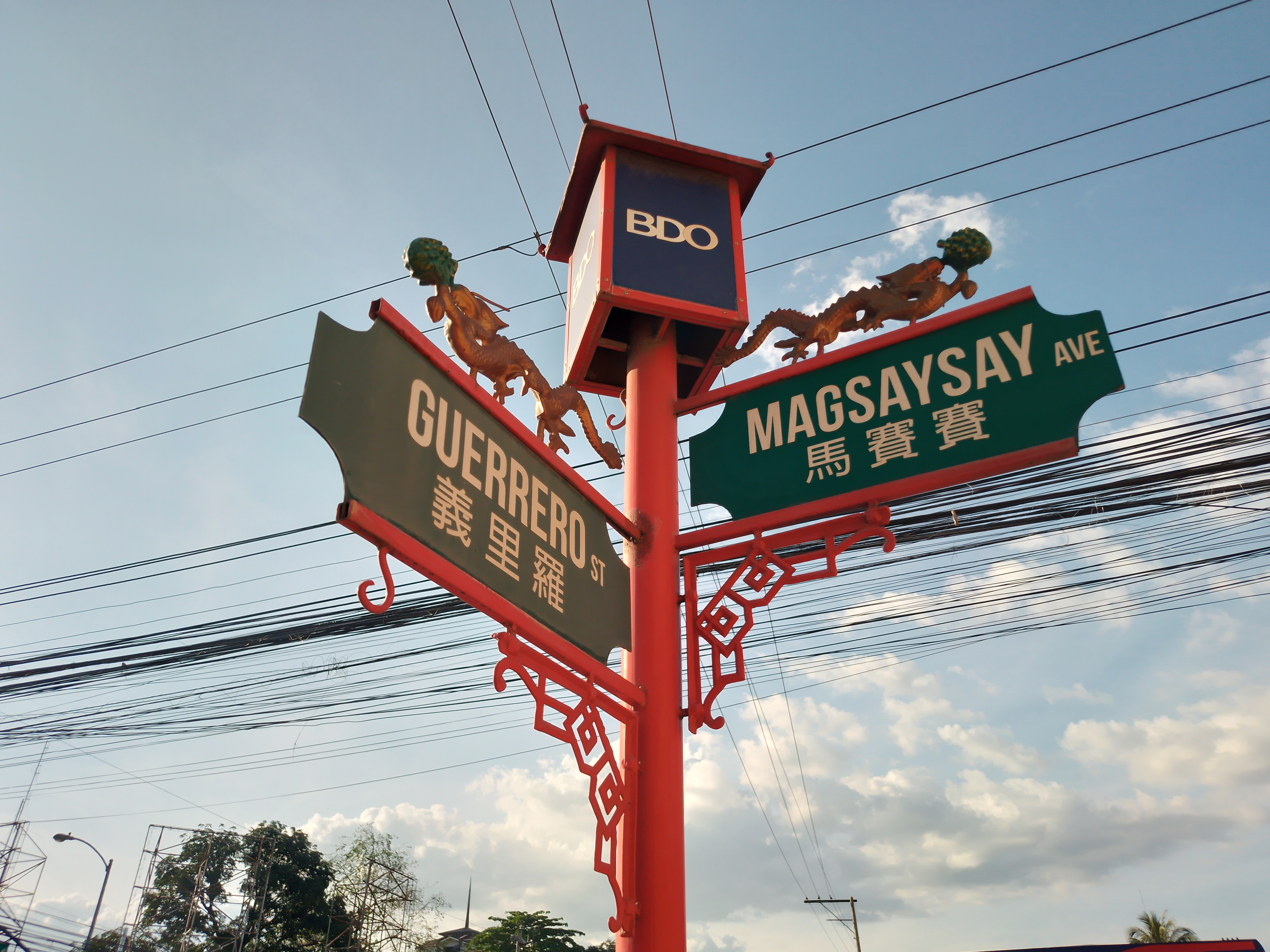
A street sign in Davao Chinatown in partnership with Banco de Oro

The common mode of transportation in the city is PUVs (public utility vehicles), like jeepneys and multicabs, that are accessible within the downtown area. In minor streets, Cycle rickshaw, also known to locals as a pedicab, offers a ride along a short distance for a low fare cost. While metered cabs reaching multiple landmarks are the alternative ride for convenient travel built with GPS, or the Global Positioning System.

== See also ==
- Chinatown
- Chinatowns in Asia
- Binondo
- List of ethnic enclaves in Philippine cities
