= Revenue stamps of the Philippines =

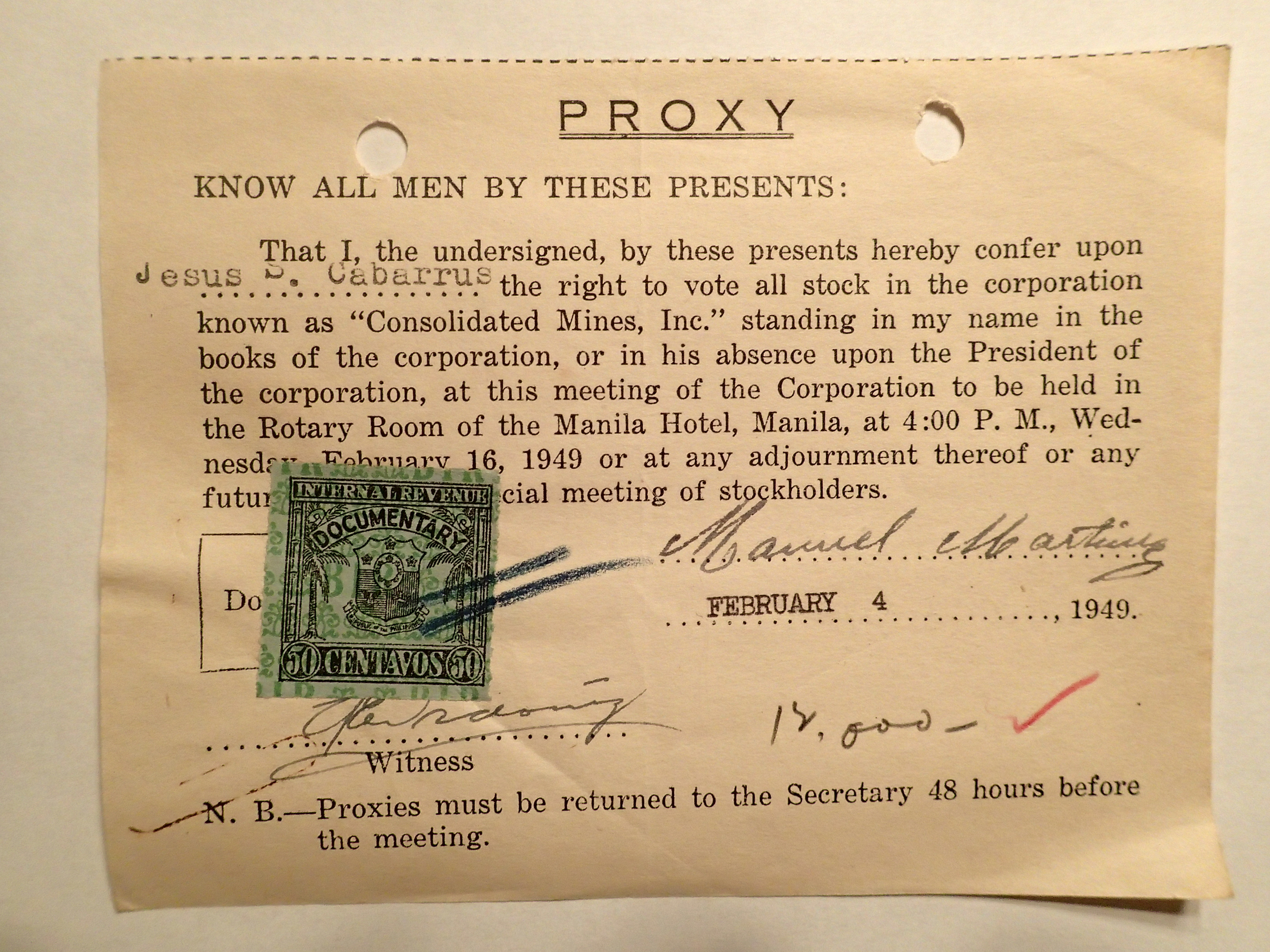
A 1947 Republic of the Philippines Documentary Revenue 50 Centavos used on a 1949 Proxy document.

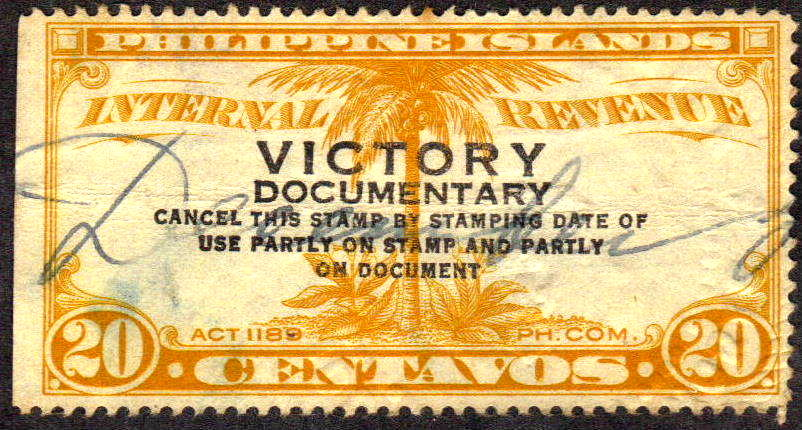
A 20c revenue stamp of the Philippines.

Governing authorities in the Philippines have issued a variety of stamps for internal revenue taxes and other fiscal taxes since 1856. Prior to 1856, internal revenues were collected via stamped paper. Revenue stamps for the Philippines were issued by the Spanish East Indies government (1856–1898), the revolutionary government of the First Philippine Republic (1898–1901), the Insular Government of the United States (1901–1935), the government of the Commonwealth of the Philippines (1935–42, 1945–46), the Philippine Executive Commission (1942–44) and the Republic of the Philippines (1946–present).

== Issuing authorities ==
=== Spanish East Indies ===
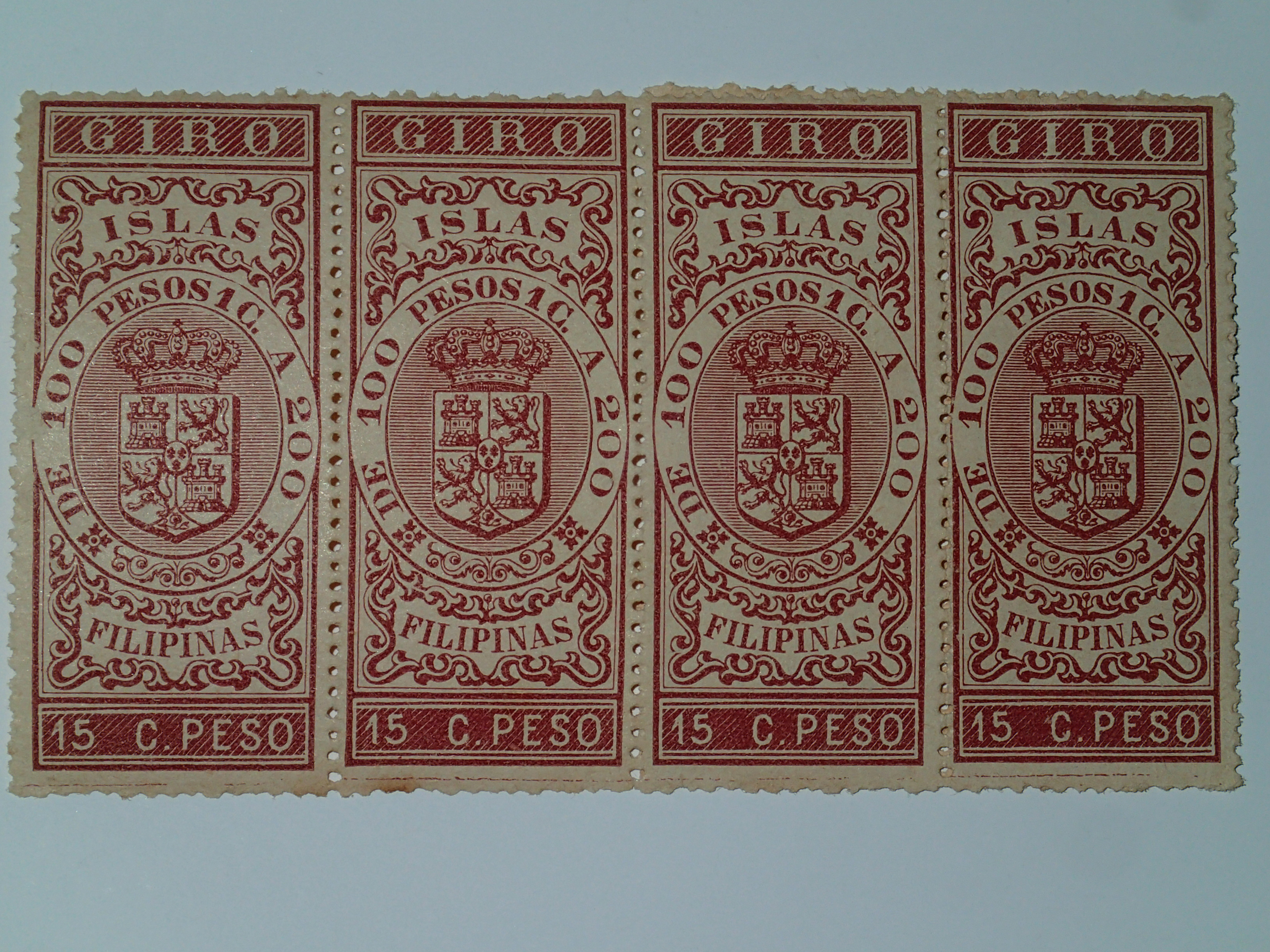
1897 Spanish Philippines 15 centimos GIRO revenue stamps.

The Spanish government of the Philippines as part of the Spanish East Indies issued revenue stamps from 1856 until 1898. Revenues were issued for judicial fees, signature Fees, drafts, passports, surtax on poll receipts, receipts and accounts, transfer of livestock and surtax on consumption. Denominations ranged from 1/2 real to 20 pesos. Original issues were printed in Spain. Provisional issues were overprinted in the Philippines.

=== First Republic ===
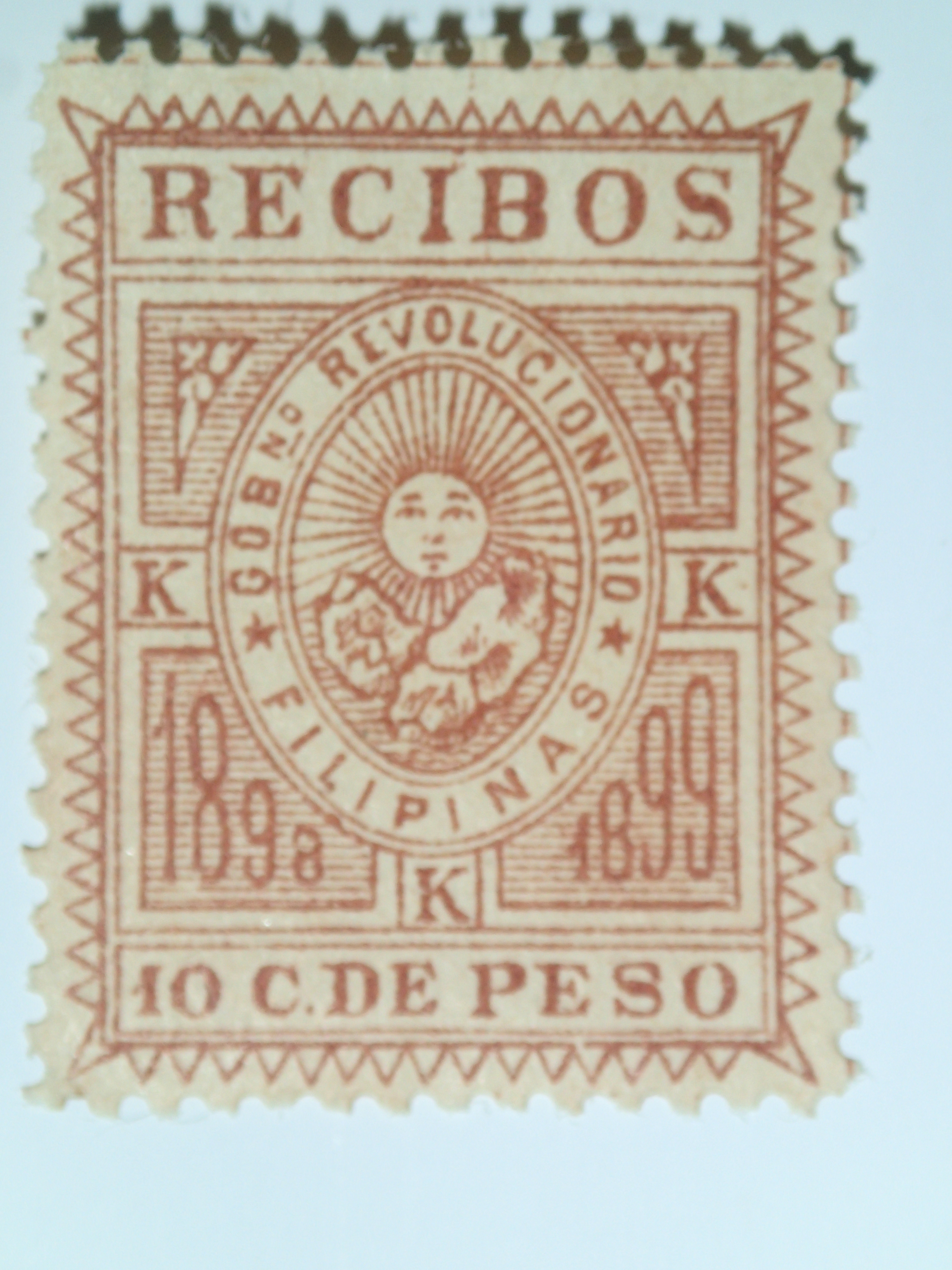
10 centimos Recibos (receipt) Revenue First Philippine Republic 1898

The First Philippine Republic was established when Emilio Aguinaldo and his forces revolted against Spanish rule in 1898. The republic was short lived as a result of the Spanish–American War which gave control of the Philippines to the United States. After a short conflict with the U.S. Aguinaldo surrendered to U.S. forces in 1901. During the First Philippine Republic, revenues were issued in 1898-99 for insurance policies, receipts, and transfer of livestock.

=== Insular Government ===
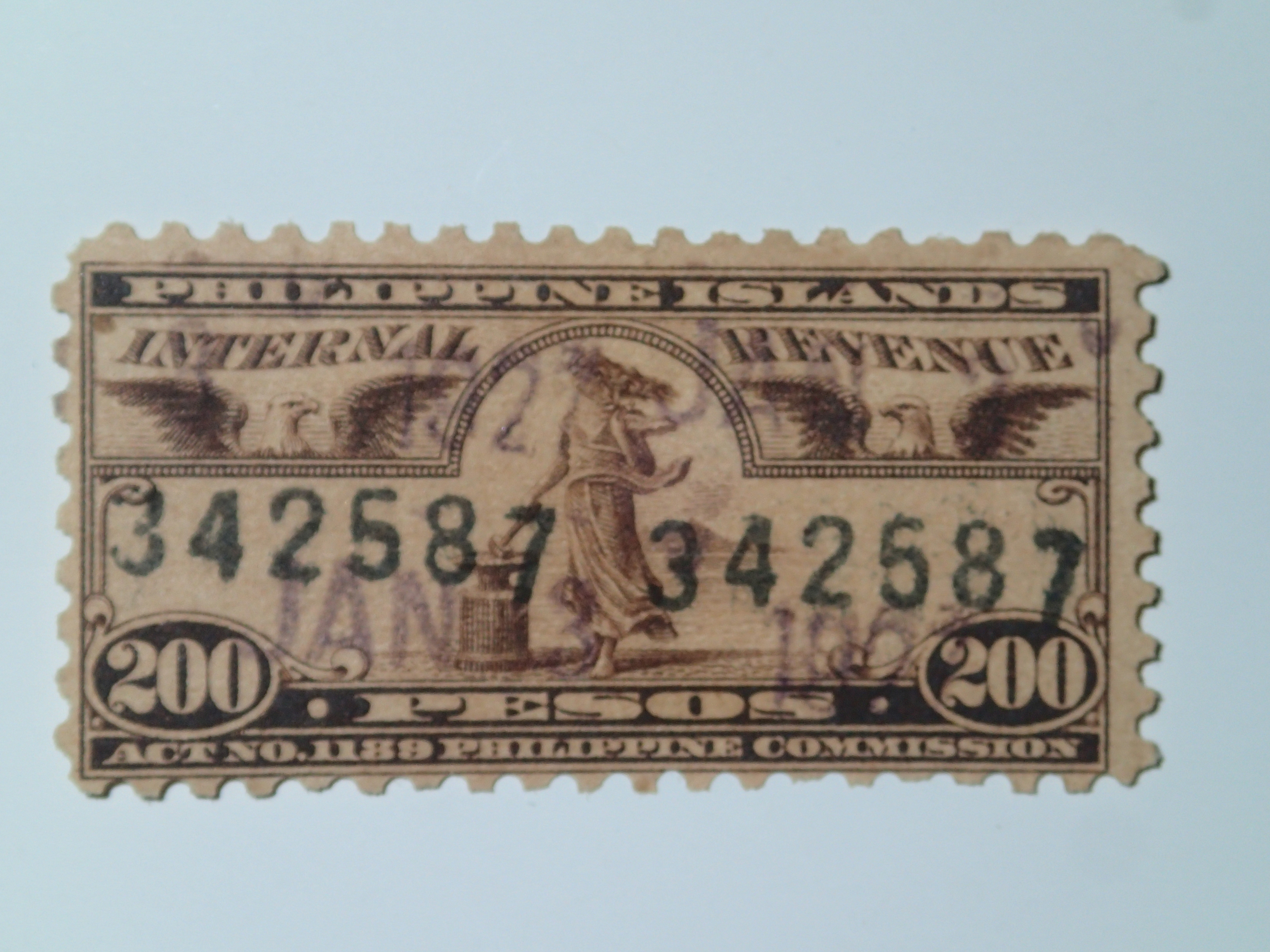
Internal Revenue Tax 1907 200 Peso

The U.S. established a military government in Manila in August 1898 during the Spanish–American War. It allowed the use of Spanish government revenues for fiscal purposes until their supply was exhausted in 1904. By this time, the United States had established a civilian administration called the Insular Government (1901–1935). This was a territorial government for the Philippine Islands. The first U.S. issues were printed in Manila in 1900 using the same designs as the Spanish issues with the exception that they were inscribed "United States Internal Revenue in the Philippine Islands". The Internal Revenue Law of 1904 provided for general internal revenue taxes, documentary taxes and transfer of livestock. A wide variety of issues exist in denominations ranging from one centavo to 20,000 pesos. Revenues issued from 1905 until 1935 were engraved and printed by the U.S. Bureau of Engraving and Printing in Washington, D.C.

=== Commonwealth ===
In 1935, the United States passed legislation granting the Philippines their independence and outlined a period of ten years for full independence from the U.S. During this period, 1935–1946, the Philippines was known as the Commonwealth of the Philippines and most internal matters were handled by a semi-autonomous Commonwealth government. Revenue stamps used during the territorial period remained in use until the Japanese occupied the islands in 1942. Cattle registration revenue stamped documents which had been in use since 1906 and inscribed "Government of the Philippine Islands" were eventually reprinted in 1936 with the inscription: "Commonwealth of the Philippines".

=== Philippine Executive Commission ===
In January 1942, shortly after the occupation of Manila, Japanese authorities established the Philippine Executive Commission as the provisional government of the Philippines under Japanese Occupation. The commission used existing supplies of revenue stamps until their exhaustion in 1944. A new issue using the previous 1934 designs was printed in Manila in 1944 and inscribed "Republic of the Philippines". When cattle registration revenue stamped documents inscribed "Commonwealth of the Philippines" were exhausted, the commission printed new documents in Manila inscribed "Philippine Executive Commission". These cattle registrations are the only Philippine revenues so inscribed. They are unique in another way as well. During the Insular and Commonwealth government periods, cattle registration documents were bi-lingual in English and Spanish. When the Philippine Executive Commission documents were printed, they were in English and Tagalog (the native language of the Philippines) as a statement against Spanish colonialism. After the war, the Republic of the Philippines issued new cattle registrations inscribed "Republic of the Philippines" and reverted to English and Spanish text.

Bi-lingual Cattle Registrations-English-Spanish and English-Tagalog
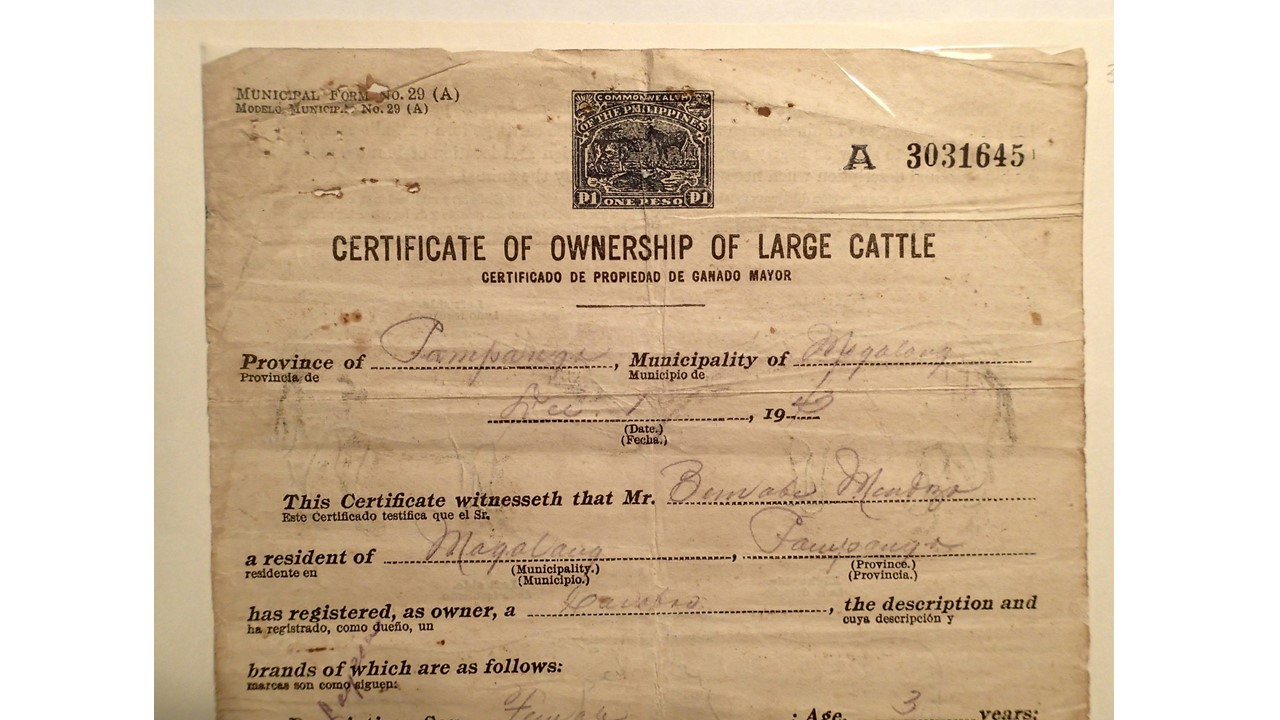
Commonwealth of the Philippines Cattle Registration used during Japanese Occupation of Philippines in 1943

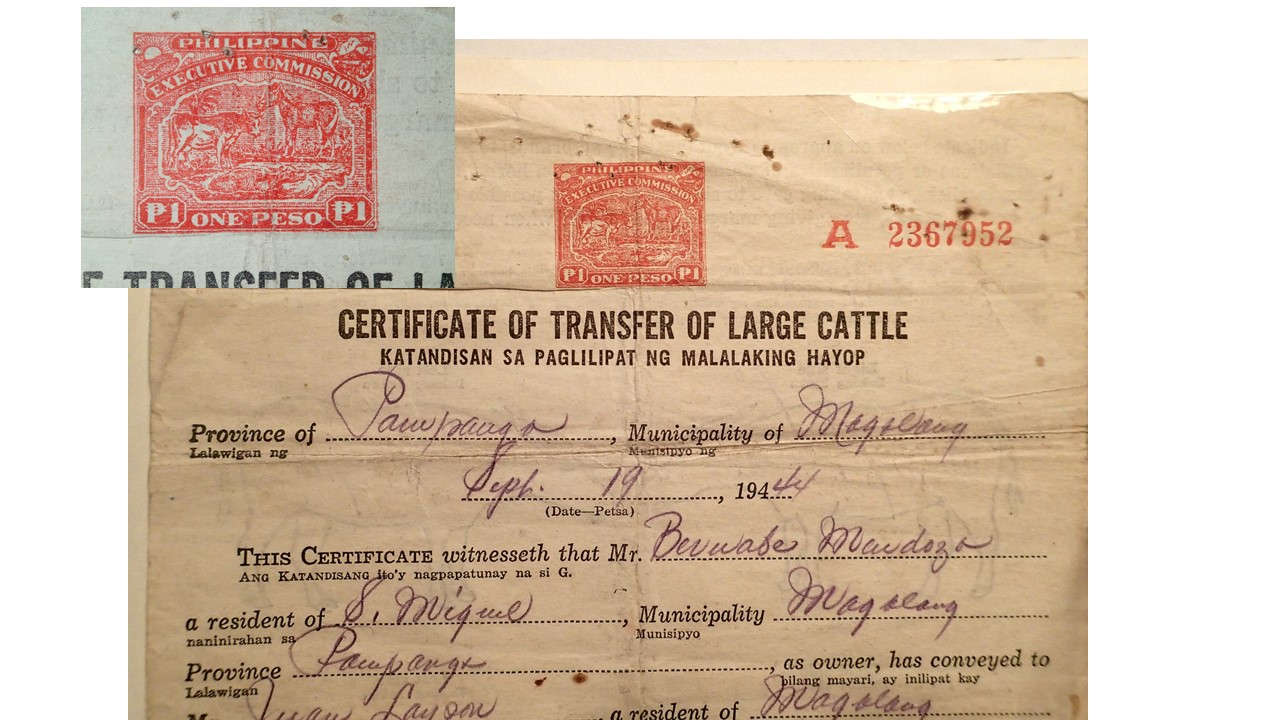
Philippine Executive Commission Cattle Registration used in 1944

=== Republic of the Philippines ===
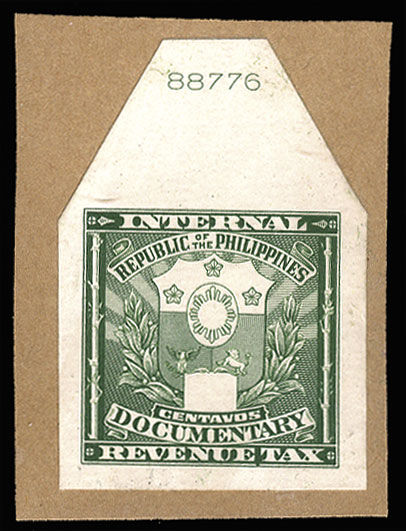
A die proof of a 1943-47 revenue stamp of the Philippines.

The Commonwealth of the Philippines was officially restored in October 1944 when General Douglas MacArthur landed at Leyte with U.S. forces. Although the Japanese Occupation didn't end until the surrender of Japan in September 1945, the Commonwealth government retained administration of the islands until July 4, 1946, when the U.S. officially granted full sovereignty and independence to the Philippines. Many of the pre-war revenues where reissued with a "Victory" overprint. After independence, the Republic of the Philippines began issuing revenue stamps inscribed "Republic of the Philippines" and of new designs.

== See also ==
- Postage stamps and postal history of the Philippines
