= Daniel R. Aguinaldo High School =

Daniel R. Aguinaldo National High School
- Mataas na Paaralan ng Daniel R. Aguinaldo (Tagalog); Taas nga Tunghaan sa Daniel R. Aguinaldo (Cebuano)

Location
- Davao City, Davao Region; Philippines
- Coordinates: 7°03′22″N 125°34′08″E

Information
- Type: Public school
- Established: February 14, 1967
- Enrollment: 7,000+
- Campus: Barangay 74-A Matina, Davao City
- Colors: Green and white
- Nickname: DRANHS, DRAHS, DRANHSian, Danielian

Daniel R. Aguinaldo National High School is a public secondary school in the Davao Region of the Philippines. It is the largest high school in Davao City. Its School ID number is 304359. It has been in business since 1967.

== Daniel R. Aguinaldo (namesake) ==
Daniel R. Aguinaldo was the founder of the Aguinaldo Development Corporation (Adecor), a company previously based in Maco, Davao del Norte. DRANHS was named such because it occupies a lot donated by the family which owns vast tracts in what is now the Matina Crossing and Matina Aplaya area under Adecor’s Mindanao Realty Corporation.

But what only the old-timers know, Daniel R. Aguinaldo was also the spirit behind what is now the Pearl Farm Beach Resort on the Island Garden City of Samal. The resort as it is now is located in Barangay Adecor. Before Pearl Farm became a resort, it was a real pearl farm named Aguinaldo Pearl Farm. It was producing pearls using Pictada maxima oysters.

Like all major logging companies in the region, the denudation of maco was attributed to Adecor. But it is also credited for the town’s infrastructure development. Adecor was one of the foremost logging firms in the Philippines then according to the Philippine Economic and Industrial Journal published in 1965. Based on accounts of Leopoldo Aguinaldo, or Lee Aguinaldo, an artist and one of the three children of Daniel R. Aguinaldo, it was said that his father’s Daniel R. Aguinaldo Corporation (Dracor) was built to extend services to Adecor. The younger Lee confirmed through his accounts that he had served company operation and logging operations of the area.

== Location ==
There are 17 regions in the Philippines as of 2011. As of 2009, there are 61 public schools in the Davao City division of Davao Region (Region XI). DRANHS is situated at Km. 5 Brgy. Matina Crossing, Davao City.
