= Philippine government securities =

Philippine government securities (locally referred to as "GS") are the unconditional debt obligations of the Republic of the Philippines. These are all denominated in the local currency, the Philippine peso. The securities are issued by the Republic through its fiscal agent, the Bureau of Treasury.

== Risk free securities ==
By convention, the risk-free interest rate is the yield that the investor can obtain by acquiring financial instruments with no default risk. In practice, finance professionals and academics classify government bonds denominated in the domestic currency of the issuing government as risk free because of the extremely low probability that the government will default on its own debt.

== Tenors ==
Treasury Bills

- Short-term (91, 182 and 364 days)
- Yield determined at auction
- Issued on a discount basis two days following the auction

Treasury Notes (2,3,4,5, & 7 years) and Bonds (10, 20 and 25 years)

- Fixed coupon rate determined at auction
- Issued at par two days following the auction
- Interest-bearing; payable semi-annually

== Government Securities Dealers ==
Financial institutions apply with the Bureau of Treasury for designation as authorized government securities dealers ("GSeDs"). As GSeDs, financial institutions are required to participate in every primary auction of GS. The GSeDs are ranked according to their volume winnings in the primary auction.

Under Philippine laws, GS are classified as securities which are exempt per se from SEC registration and automatically classified as registered securities upon issuance. Financial institutions duly registered with the Philippine Securities and Exchange Commission are automatically eligible to trade and distribute GS.

== Registry of Scripless Securities ("RoSS") ==
Registry of Scripless Securities (RoSS) is the official record of absolute ownership, legal or beneficial title or interest in GS. Upon award of GS to a GSED at the auction, the securities award record are downloaded electronically into the GSED’s Securities Principal Account in RoSS. Every sale of GS by a dealer reduces its Securities Principal Account in RoSS. Conversely, every purchase of GS by a GSED increases its Securities Principal Account in RoSS. The ownership/interest of secondary market buyer, trustee, pledgee, etc. of GS is recorded in the Securities Client Account in RoSS. The recording is done by merely keying-in the trade at the respective BIS terminals of the trade counter-parties and within seconds the trade information is received by the RoSS. At the end of trading hours, all matched trades (confirmed by both counterparties) are referred to the Bangko Sentral ng Pilipinas (BSP) for settlement (debit of GSED buyer and credit of GSED seller Demand Accounts). This completes the process of trading in the secondary market. This effectively conforms with the G-30 Recommendations of Delivery-versus-Payment (DvP) through Netting but Same-Day-Settlement. (Taken from the Bureau of Treasury Website)

=== Background ===
The Registry of Scripless Securities ("RoSS") was established in November 1996 by the Bureau of the Treasury under then Treasurer of the Philippines, Caridad Valdehuesa. RoSS was implemented to respond and eliminate the operating risks posed by the issuance, trading, and transportation of certificated securities as highlighted by the Bancapital financial scandal of 1994.

Since all GS were certificated prior to the advent of RoSS, dealers resorted to the exchange of warehouse receipts rather than the physical movement of the certificates in the course of their trading activities. Bancapital conducted brokering operations based on these warehouse receipts and the 1994 scandal erupted when the physical count of certificates against warehouse receipts did not tally. The scandal was far reaching and threatened to collapse market confidence in the GS market.

The BTr facilitated the issuance of enabling regulations which did away with the need to issue GS in certificated form and allowed it to directly record new issuances within RoSS itself.

As the official register, RoSS is primarily tasked with monitoring and maintaining official records of ownership over GS. In addition, RoSS also monitors and administers GS coupon and principal payments. At the same time, as official register, the BTr can accommodate investors who have a particular need or requirement to have their ownership of GS directly known to the BTr.

=== Third Party Custodians ===
As part of its efforts to improve Philippine capital markets, the Philippine monetary authority, the Bangko Sentral ng Pilipinas, promulgated Circular 392 covering the delivery of securities. Prior to Circular 392, GSeDs could likewise perform custody services for investors that it sold GS to.

With Circular 392, investors are now required to designate third party securities custodians that will hold the securities in their name. In turn, the GSeDs are required to deliver securities that they have sold to investors into the investors' custody accounts. Circular 392 was devised to increase investor protection as the responsibility over custody and recordkeeping of investor holdings has been removed from the GSeDs.

Investors complying with Circular 392 have their record of ownership maintained by their third party custodians. RoSS records all GS safekept with third party custodians as owned by them. The individual investor accounts and their holdings are not recorded with RoSS.
