= Davao Chong Hua High School =

Private Chinese high school in Davao City, Philippines

Davao Chong Hua High School (Davao Central High School)
- 納卯中華中學

Location
- Sta. Ana corner J.P. Laurel Avenue, Davao City, Davao del Sur; Philippines; 7°04′37″N 125°36′50″E

Information
- Type: Private, Non-sectarian, Chinese school
- Motto: Excellence, Virtue, Service
- Established: June 3, 1924
- Director: Melchor C. Te
- Principal: Walter Valencerina; Rosita N. Te
- Grades: Nursery to Grade 12
- Enrollment: 428
- Campus: Sta. Ana corner J.P. Laurel Avenue, Davao City, Philippines
- Colors: White & Blue
- Nickname: Chonghuans

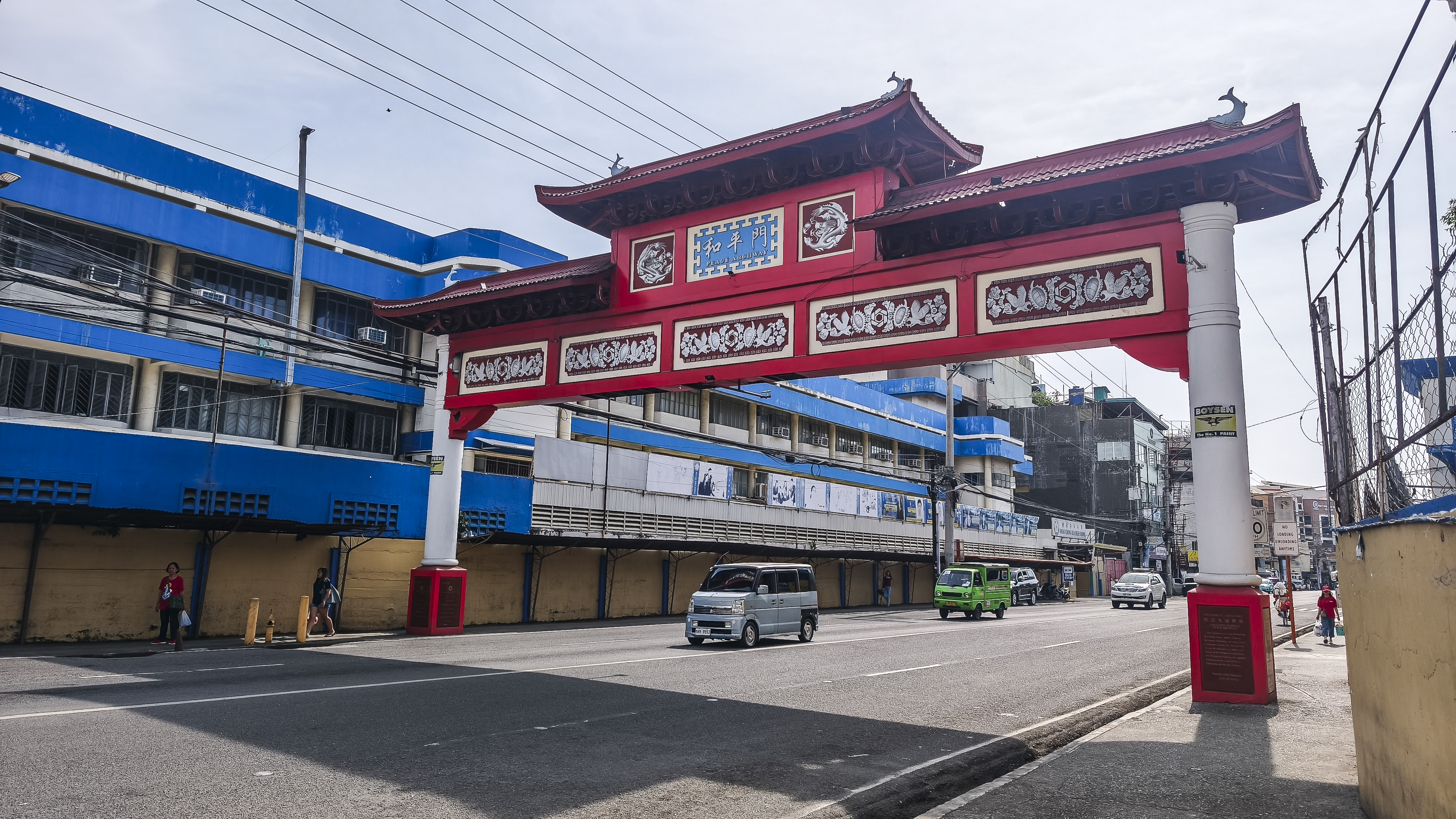
Davao Chong Hua High School

Davao Chong Hua High School (simplified Chinese: 纳卯中华中学; traditional Chinese: 納卯中華中學; pinyin: Nàmǎo Zhōnghuá Zhōngxué; Pe̍h-ōe-jī: La̍p-báu Tiong-hôa Tiong-o̍h), formerly known as Davao Chinese High School (1924—1976) and Davao Central High School (1976—2016), is the first Chinese school in Davao City, established on June 3, 1924. It is a private, nonsectarian school on Sta. Ana cor. J.P. Laurel Ave., Davao City, Philippines.

== History ==
The Davao Chong Hua High School, formerly known as the Davao Central High School and Davao Chinese High School, was founded on June 3, 1924. It traced its beginning to two rented classrooms at San Pedro Street with only 30 students. Seeing the need to acquire a permanent school site, Don Francisco Villa-Abrille Lim Juna (林全份), a charter board member, donated a 10,000 square-meter lot, which became the present school site. The first building was a one-storey wooden structure. Classes were held in the new site in January 1925 with the aim of preserving and propagating Chinese language and culture. The school offered a dual curriculum in English and Chinese. It was then the only school in the City of Davao offering Chinese language.

After twenty years of development, three classroom buildings and one dormitory were constructed, with a student population of more than 300. However, toward the end of the Japanese occupation during the World War II, all but one building were destroyed. After the war, four more classroom buildings and one dormitory were constructed.

In 1965, the city government expropriated 1,789 square meters of the school property for the Sta. Ana Avenue, which cuts through the school campus. In 1976, in compliance with Presidential Decree No.176 Filipinizing alien schools all over the country, the name Davao Chinese High School was change into Davao Central High School.

From 1983 to 1998, the board of trustees under the leadership of the dynamic chairman, Guilbert Go, completed the construction of the three-storey concrete buildings and one four-storey building. This paved the way to start the modernization of Davao Central High School.

Delfin Go succeeded Guilbert Go as the chairman of the board of trustees in 1998. During his term, a modern three-storey building was constructed and named Tan Yan Kee Memorial Preschool in honor of the father of Dr. Lucio Tan, chairman emeritus of the board of trustees. Another grand project, the Jolly Central Covered Court, was donated by an alumnus, Tony Tan Caktiong. After the term of Delfin Go, Chua Tun-Chuan and Jesus Uy succeeded one after the other, as the chairmen of the Board. During their terms, the school continued to march achieving quality education.

== School emblem ==
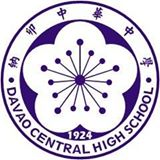
Former logo as Davao Central High School from 1976 to 2016

The school emblem, represents a stylized flower of the Chinese plum tree, the national flower of China known as the "Mei Hua." The tiny pink flower blooms in the coldest winter. The colder the weather, the more the beautiful its bloom. This rare quality symbolizes nobility and the strength of the character, as well as courage and persistence. Hence, it was chosen as the school emblem for the same significance.

== Community ==
Davao Chong Hua High School is part of the Filipino-Chinese schools in Davao City. Schools that teach Chinese are Davao Christian High School, Stella Maris Academy Of Davao, Colegio De San Ignacio, Philippine Academy of Sakya.

Preceded by Philippine Cultural College; June 27, 1923	Oldest Chinese School in the Philippines; 21st June 3, 1924	Succeeded by Cotabato City Institute; September 3, 1924
