= South Crest School =

Private school in Muntinlupa, Philippines

Location
- MBAI Commercial Complex, Soldiers Hills; Muntinlupa, Metro Manila; Philippines
- Coordinates: 14°23′57″N 121°02′31″E

Information
- Type: Private, Non-sectarian
- Motto: A South Crestian is a MOVER
- Established: 1983
- Grades: K to 12

South Crest School is a private primary and secondary educational institution in Muntinlupa in the Philippines. It is situated between two subdivisions, Agro Homes and Soldiers' Hills, thus giving it two addresses: 101 Canary St, Agro Homes Subdivision, Putatan, Muntinlupa and MBAI Commercial Complex, Soldiers Hills, Muntinlupa.

It was founded in 1983 as the Agro Homes Early Education Center (AHEEC) and since then has evolved into one of the leading schools in Muntinlupa. The students have been placed among the Ten Most Outstanding Students of Muntinlupa for the past 20 years, almost annually.

== Beginnings ==
The late Major-General Santiago R. Madrid Jr., together with his family, settled at Soldiers' Hills Subdivision after his stint as commander in Cebu Island. When his fourth child, Judy, was already of schooling age, they began searching for a school they could entrust her in. To their dismay, not one was present in the vicinity of Soldiers' Hills and even in the adjacent Agro Homes.

The Major General Santiago R. Madrid Jr. Building, which is the main building of the campus

They considered starting a preschool. Mrs. Remedios Madrid, the general's wife, was particularly confident for she was a teacher herself. Thus, armed with municipal government's permission (Muntinlupa was still a municipality then) and sheer determination, they founded the Agro Homes Early Education Center in 1982. Mrs. Madrid invited some of her teacher friends to operate the fledgling learning center, teaching basic skills such as writing, speaking, mathematics and values. In the short span of two years, the school earned the respect and trust of parents within the area for its excellence in instructing children.

== Expansion ==
In 1992, after requests from parents and pupils to expand the service of AHEEC to the community, the school administration established Elementary and Secondary Levels, registering itself under the name South Crest School. To meet the needs of the growing student population then, they expanded the school complex to the former cogonal area of Soldiers' Hills (whose remnants are still preserved today as a study area for students and as a site of observation for biology activities).

The 4th Year Students of Batch 2005-2006 performing during the Nutrition Month Celebration 2005

== Affiliations ==
- Aerospace Cadets of the Philippines (127th Squadron)
- Rotary Interact (under the supervision of the Rotary Club of Muntinlupa Business District)
- Alliance of Private School Administrators of Muntinlupa (APSAM)
- SCHOLASTIC Prime Mathematics

== Awards Received ==
Aerospace Cadets of SCS as Carside Honor Guards during the Annual Teachers' Day Celebration. School Directress Mrs. Remedios Madrid passes through the lines.

- 2001 - "Center of Mathematics" in the City of Muntinlupa cited by the Division Office of the Department of Education . The School offers specialized training, innovative programs and new instructional techniques in Mathematics.
- 2000 - By the Rotary International District 3810 as one of the Rotary Interact Clubs with Excellent Community Projects in National Capital Region and Recipient of Ambassador of Goodwill to Japan and Outbound Youth Exchange Team to Singapore and Malaysia
- 2019 - OVER-ALL CHAMPION, Aerospace Cadets of the Philippines NCR Competition

         的是什么
