= Davao Christian High School =

Private Chinese school in Davao City, Philippines

- 納卯基督教中學
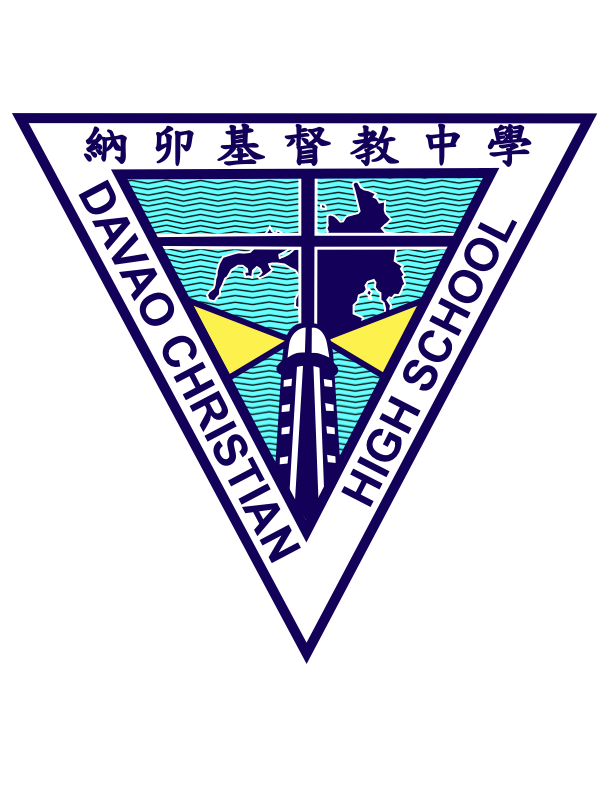

Location
- V. Mapa St. and C.P. Garcia Diversion Rd. Davao City, Davao del Sur; Philippines
- Coordinates: 7°4′47″N 125°36′38″E

Information
- Type: Private
- Religious affiliation: Christian
- Established: January 14, 1953
- President: Arthur Brian Yap
- Director: Desi Dario Magnaye V. MAPA; Jocy So-Yeung CPG
- Principal: Eva Bigaran V. MAPA-PS; Elizabeth Pasaje V. MAPA-GS; Charivel Aban V. MAPA-JHS; Jessa Te V. MAPA-SHS; Catherine Labora CPG-PS; Jocy So-Yeung CPG-GS; Iva Barbara Caballero CPG-JHS
- Grades: K to 12
- Campus: V. Mapa St, Bajada, Davao City, Philippines | C.P Garcia, Diversion Rd, Davao City, Philippines
- Colors: White and Blue
- Newspaper: Hillstar V. MAPA; Sky High CPG
- Yearbook: White and Blue V. MAPA; Elevate CPG
- Website: www.dchs.edu.ph

Davao Christian High School (traditional Chinese: 納卯基督教中學; simplified Chinese: 纳卯基督教中学; pinyin: Nàmǎo Jīdūjiào Zhōngxué; Pe̍h-ōe-jī: La̍p-báu Ki-tok-kàu Tiong-o̍h), is a Filipino-Chinese high school in Davao City, Philippines. It was founded in 1953 by the Davao Evangelical Church.

== History ==
Davao Christian High School started in the 1950s. Members of Davao Evangelical Church, then known as Davao Chinese Gospel Church, sought to provide catechism to the young. This vision came to reality on January 14, 1953 when Davao Chinese Gospel Church Kindergarten School was established.

The first kindergarten class of 14 was held in Atty. Rafael Lim's residence along Rizal Street. Bona Lim, a full-time church worker, served as the preschool head. She, her sister Valeria Lim and fellow church member Lourdes Chiew were the school's first teachers.

The first batch of kindergarten pupils graduated 1954 and a board of trustees was formally organized in 1957. Job Chen, a church elder, was elected the first chairman of the board. In 1959, the school began offering Grades 1 to 4 classes in an academic building and student-teacher dormitory in Garcia Heights, Bajada. The first batch of 14 elementary pupils graduated in 1962.

The school moved one step further by offering high school education in 1971. By 1973, the school was officially named Davao Christian High School. The first batch of 36 high school students graduated in 1975. School population exceeded 1000 by 1982. The Student Council was organized in 1984. The DCHS Alumni Association was organized in 1987.

Soon, the Bajada campus was no longer sufficient for the growing school population and needs. The school relocated to V. Mapa Street in 1988 with the completion of the initial phase of the 3-storey U-shaped building. Construction of an air-conditioned auditorium with an 1100-seat capacity followed in 1990.

The school went for accreditation through the Association of Christian Schools, Colleges and Universities-Accrediting Agency, Inc. Both the high school and elementary departments obtained level 2 status by 1994 and 1996 respectively.

A 3-storey academic and athletic building was added in 2007. It now houses the high school classrooms and the covered basketball court. Several science laboratories and home economics laboratories were also added.

As the population of the school continues to grow, they opened another branch located along the C.P. Garcia Highway. Phase One of the building was completed just in time for the next school year 2015-2016, housing more than 20 classrooms, a mini auditorium, a library, 2 laboratories, offices, and other rooms.

In 2017, another building was made in the V. MAPA campus to cater the 2 additional levels mandated by the DepEd's transition to the K to 12 Basic Education Program. The building showcases a canteen in the first floor, various classrooms and offices in the second to fourth floor, and a multi-purpose hall in the fifth floor.

== School logo ==
The school logo consists of a triangle with the English and Chinese names of the school, a map of Mindanao, a lighthouse and a cross. The lighthouse is a reminder that Christians ought to live as the light of the world. The map of Mindanao signifies the place where the school is situated and where the light shines forth. The cross on top identifies the centrality of Jesus Christ in the school.
