= Tamsui (disambiguation) =

Tamsui is a district in New Taipei, Taiwan.

Tamsui may also refer to:

- Tamsui ageh, a speciality food from Tamsui District, New Taipei, Taiwan
- Tamsui Art Gallery, an arts center in Tamsui District, New Taipei, Taiwan
- Tamsui Church, a church in Tamsui District, New Taipei, Taiwan
- Tamsui Customs Officers' Residence, a historical residence in Tamsui District, New Taipei, Taiwan
- Tamsui Customs Wharf, a wharf in Tamsui District, New Taipei, Taiwan
- Tamsui Fisherman's Wharf, a major fishing harbor in Tamsui District, New Taipei, Taiwan
- Tamsui hat, a straw hat made in Taiwan
- Tamsui Historical Museum, a museum in Tamsui District, New Taipei, Taiwan
- Tamsui Lover's Bridge, a bridge in Tamsui Fisherman's Wharf, Tamsui District, New Taipei, Taiwan
- Tamsui line, a Taiwanese railroad branch line
- Tamsui line, a Taiwanese metro branch line of the Tamsui–Xinyi line, Taipei Metro
- Tamsui metro station, a station of the Taipei Metro
- Tamsui Old Street, a street in Tamsui District, New Taipei, Taiwan
- Tamsui Oxford University College
- Tamsui Red Castle, a 19th-century mansion in Tamsui District, New Taipei, Taiwan
- Tamsui River, a river in northern Taiwan
- Battle of Tamsui, a significant French defeat by the Qing dynasty at Tamsui

== See also ==
- Danshui (disambiguation)
