= Teng Feng Fish Ball Museum =

Museum in Tamsui, New Taipei, Taiwan

- 登峰魚丸博物館
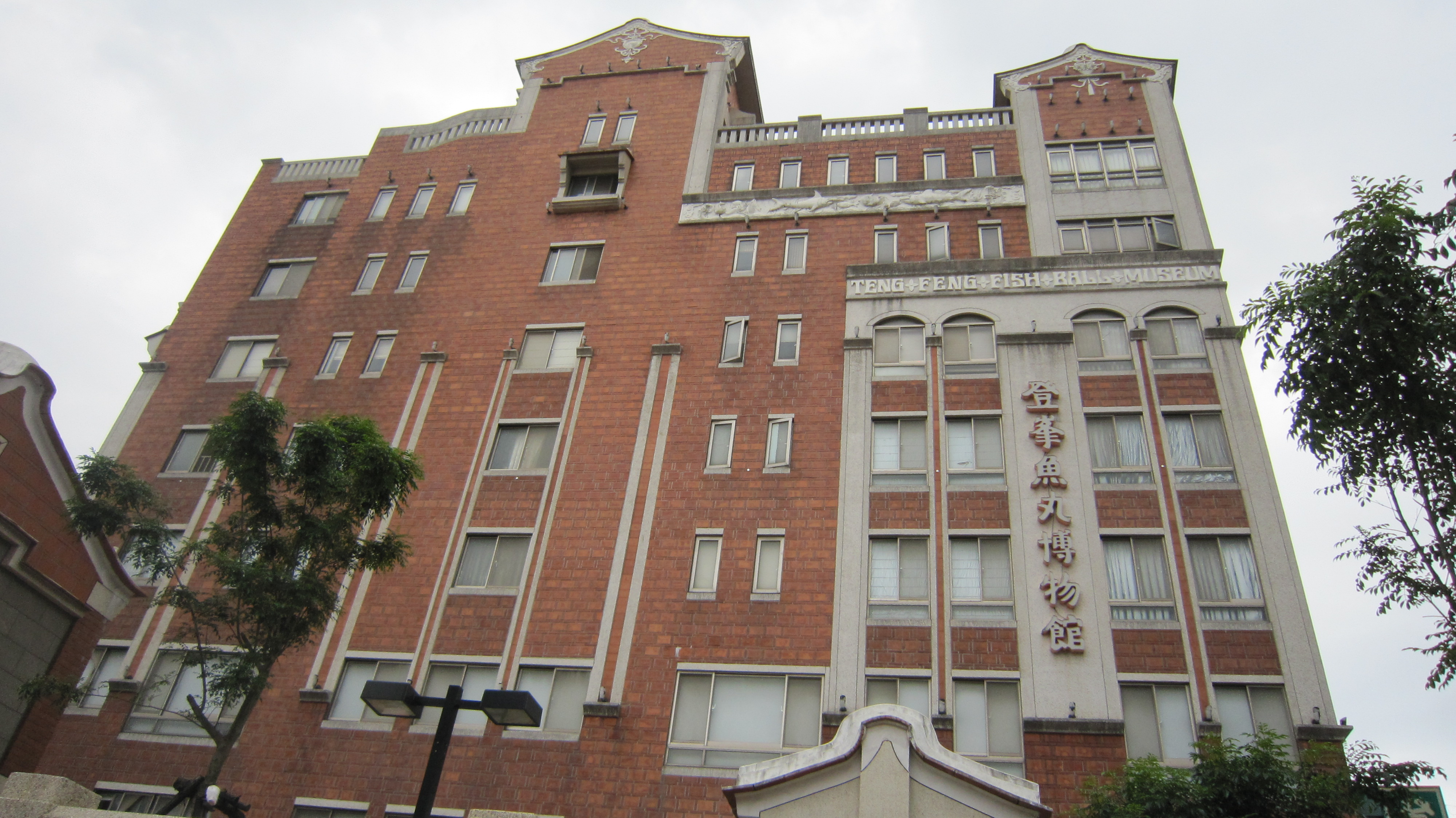
- Established: 2004
- Location: Tamsui, New Taipei, Taiwan
- Coordinates: 25°10′12″N 121°26′23″E
- Type: food museum
- Website: www.fish-ball.com.tw

The Teng Feng Fish Ball Museum (traditional Chinese: 登峰魚丸博物館; simplified Chinese: 登峰鱼丸博物馆; pinyin: Dēngfēng Yúwán Bówùguǎn) is a food museum about fish balls in Tamsui District, New Taipei, Taiwan.

== History ==
The museum was established in 2004.

== Architecture ==
The museum building is divided into two exhibition halls. The first exhibition hall is located on Tamsui Old Street consists of three floors. The second exhibition hall is located at where the Weixiang Fish Ball Shop used to be.

== Exhibitions ==
The museum display various production equipment to make the food. It also showcases the production and environmental impact of creating fish ball products.

== Transportation ==
The museum is accessible within walking distance northwest from Tamsui Station of the Taipei Metro.

== See also ==
- List of museums in Taiwan
