= Danshui (disambiguation) =

Danshui, a Hanzi pinyin for Tamsui, is a district in New Taipei, Taiwan.

Danshui may also refer to:

- Danshui town (淡水), a town in Huizhou Zhoutian village, Guishan county, Guangdong province
- Danshui County (丹水縣; around present-day Xichuan County, Henan)
- Danshui Erbu, or "the Second Port on Fresh Water"
- Danshui Town (丹水镇), a town in Xixia County, Henan province, China
- Danshuichi station, a station on Line 1 of Wuhan Metro
- Danshui Subdistrict (淡水街道), a subdistrict in Huiyang District, Huizhou, Guangdong province, People's Republic of China
- Xiao Danshui (小淡水)

== See also ==
- Tamsui (disambiguation)
