= New Taipei Municipal Zhuwei High School =

New Taipei Municipal ZhuWei High School 新北市立竹圍高級中學

Location
- No.35, Zhulin Rd., Tamsui, New Taipei 25159, Taiwan25.14569°N 121.46270°E

Information
- Type: Combined Junior & Senior High School
- Established: 1996
- Principal: Mr. ZONG-MIN Wu (吳宗珉)
- Website: http://www.zwhs.ntpc.edu.tw/

New Taipei Municipal Zhuwei High School (ZWHS; Chinese: 新北市立竹圍高級中學) is a combined junior and senior high school located in Tamsui District, New Taipei City, Taiwan. It was founded in 1996. As of 2014, the principal was Wu Zong-Min.

== School and History ==
The campus of Zhuwei High School is situated near the Datun Mountain Range and looks out on the Tamsui River and Guanyin Mountain. River and mountain views surround a campus of 4.6 hectares, and this environment is serviced by a full-range of facilities. As a suburb of the Taipei metropolitan area, the MRT system has brought a fast expansion in the population of Zhuwei. Originally, the area had only one elementary school, requiring graduates to travel to more densely populated areas for secondary education.

The community was in need of a secondary school, and petitions were launched to address this need. In order to answer the needs of the community and ensure balanced development of education, Taipei County Government approved a plan to build a fourth junior high school, named Taipei County Municipal Zhuwei High School, in the Tamsui area on October 26, 1989. On August 1, 2012, the School was reorganized into a high school and named the New Taipei City Zhuwei Senior High School. This upgrade established the school as the 15th complete secondary school in New Taipei City and the only public school in the Tamsui area. In the same year, the school enrolled its first batch of high school freshmen (10th graders), and Wu Chong Min was appointed as the first principal of this newly upgraded secondary school.
