= Tamsui Red Castle =

Former residence in Tamsui, New Taipei, Taiwan

- 淡水紅樓
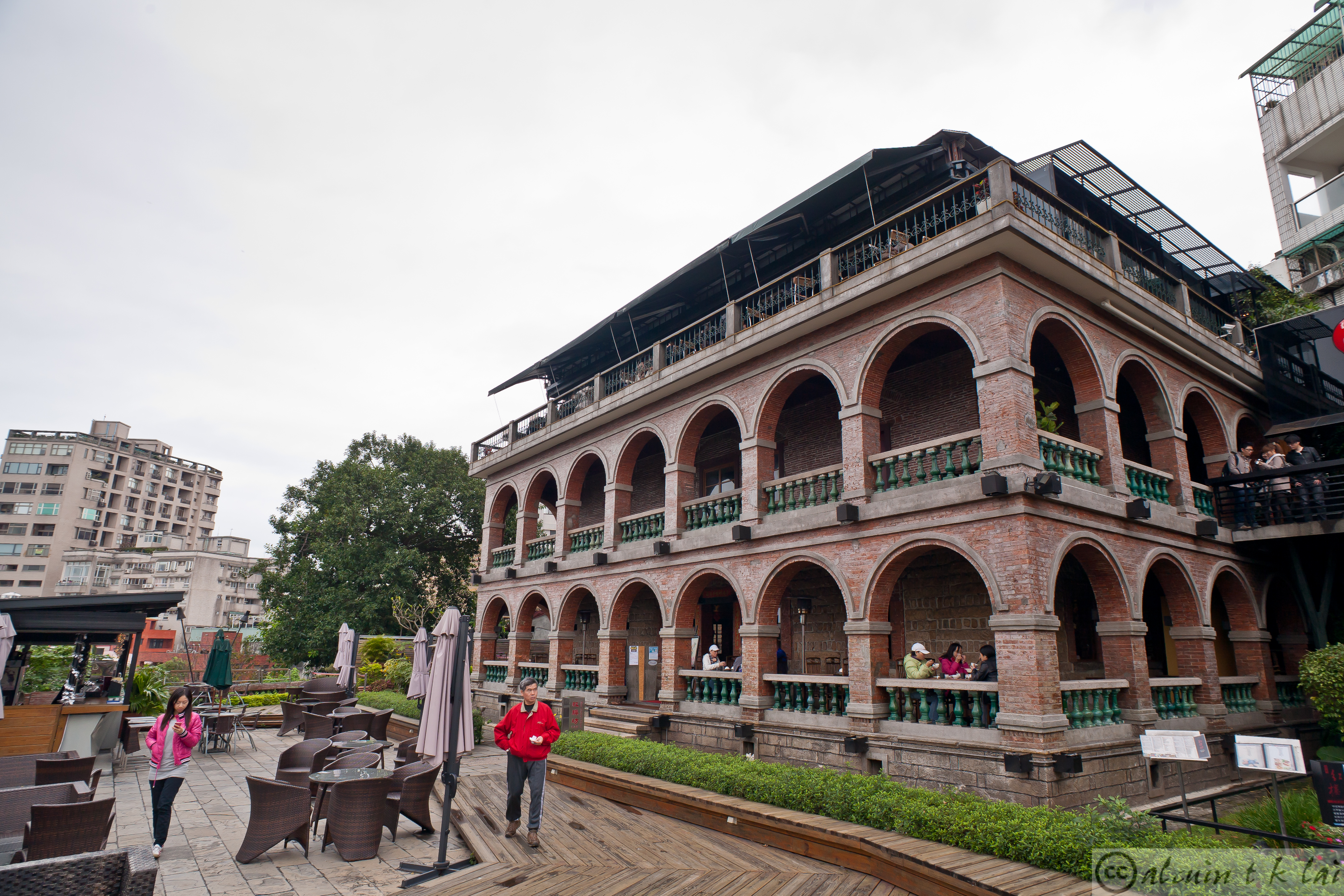
- Interactive map of the Tamsui Red Castle area
- Former names: Daguanlo

General information
- Type: restaurant
- Architectural style: Victorian
- Location: Tamsui, New Taipei, Taiwan
- Coordinates: 25°10′17″N 121°26′22.1″E
- Completed: 1899

Technical details
- Floor count: 3

The Tamsui Red Castle (traditional Chinese: 淡水紅樓; simplified Chinese: 淡水红楼; pinyin: Dànshuǐ Hónglóun) is a 19th-century mansion in Tamsui District, New Taipei, Taiwan.

== History ==
The building was originally called Daguanlo and was planned in 1895 and built in 1899 during the Japanese rule of Taiwan as an accommodation for a local rich businessperson, Mr. Li. It was then later on taken over by the chairperson of Tamsui Street, Mr. Hung, after the decline of Mr. Li's family business. Afterwards, the building had been experiencing many changes throughout the time until recently it has been converted into a Chinese restaurant and café.

== Architecture ==
The building is a three-story structure with Victorian architecture style. It has three-sided corridor constructed with red bricks. The ground and first floor is dedicated for a restaurant and the top most floor is dedicated for a café.

== Transportation ==
The building is accessible within walking distance northwest of Tamsui Station of Taipei Metro.

== See also ==
- List of tourist attractions in Taiwan
