= Tamshui Junior High School =

Coordinates: 25°10′29.82″N 121°26′13.27″E

New Taipei City Tamshui Junior High School
- 新北市立淡水國民中學

Location
- No. 10, Zhenli St, Tamshui Dist. New Taipei City; Taiwan

Information
- School type: Public school
- Established: 1946
- Head of school: Lin Yukuo
- Grades: 7 - 9
- Age range: 13 - 15
- Language: Chinese (Traditional)
- Website: www.tsjh.ntpc.edu.tw

The New Taipei Tamshui Junior High School (Chinese: 新北市立淡水國民中學) is a junior high school in Tamsui District, New Taipei, Taiwan.

== History ==
The school was founded in July, 1946 and was named “Tamshui Middle School, Taipei County.” It was expanded to be school dormitory on the basis of the location of “Hsunchang Elementary School” which was set up by Japanese on Chenli Street. Tamshui mayor, Tu Lishui, worked part-time and became the first principal. The successors were Yang Chingwei, Tung Paoching, Wang Kotso, Liu Chingyao, Chao Jenho, Han Juikwang, Chiu Wenchung, Hsu Maohsiung, Wan I-cheng, Chiu Wenhui, and Chen Tienkuo. Present principal, Lin Yukuo, has taken over the position since August 1.

At the beginning of the foundation, Tamshui Junior High School only had six Japanese classrooms, an auditorium, and three classes, and there were 126 students in total. However, because of the extension of compulsory education, the increasing numbers of students and the teaching needs, the school expanded its buildings and equipment constantly. The modern buildings, Jung Shiau Building, Ren Ai Building, Shin Yi Building, Hoping Building, Yi Shian Building, San Min Building and Jung Jeng Hall, were built sequentially. From 1989, the school also constructed three buildings (Cheng Jeng Building, Chin Ai Building, Rih Sin Building), and other equipment, such as the PU playground, the passage of the forecourt, the parking lot and the aquatic plants garden.

To effectively release the pressure of increasing classes, the school was commissioned to cofound Jhengde and Jhuwei Junior High Schools since 78th academic year. Jhengde and Jhuwei Junior High Schools started enrolling students in August, 1993 and 1996, respectively. To effectively release the pressure of increasing classes, the school was commissioned to cofound Jhengde and Jhuwei Junior High Schools since 78th academic year. Jhengde and Jhuwei Junior High Schools started enrolling students in August, 1993 and 1996, respectively.

In 81st academic year, the classes, faculties, and students were the most highest with 88 Day Division General Classes, three Special Classes, four Subsidiary School which were totally 95 classes. The total number of students and faculties amounted to 4,104 and 214, respectively. Graduates of all previous years surpassed 30,000 who have responsibilities for the society and win glory for Tamshui Junior High School.
