= Drop of Water Memorial Hall =

Memorial hall in Tamsui, New Taipei, Taiwan

Tamsui Itteki Memorial House
- 一滴水紀念館
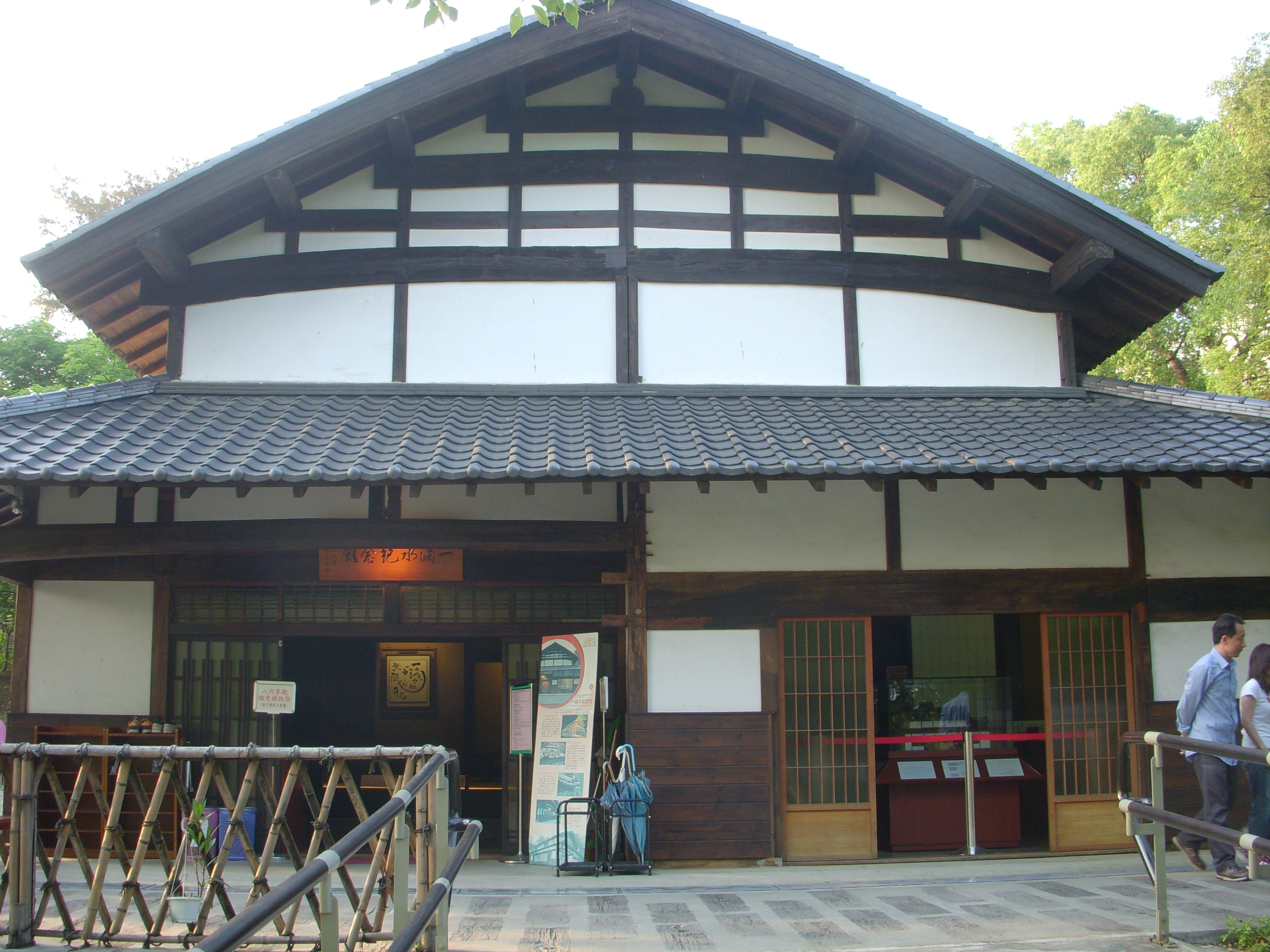
- Interactive map of the Tamsui Itteki Memorial House area

General information
- Type: memorial hall
- Location: Tamsui, New Taipei, Taiwan
- Coordinates: 25°10′41.5″N 121°25′50.9″E
- Opened: 5 April 2011

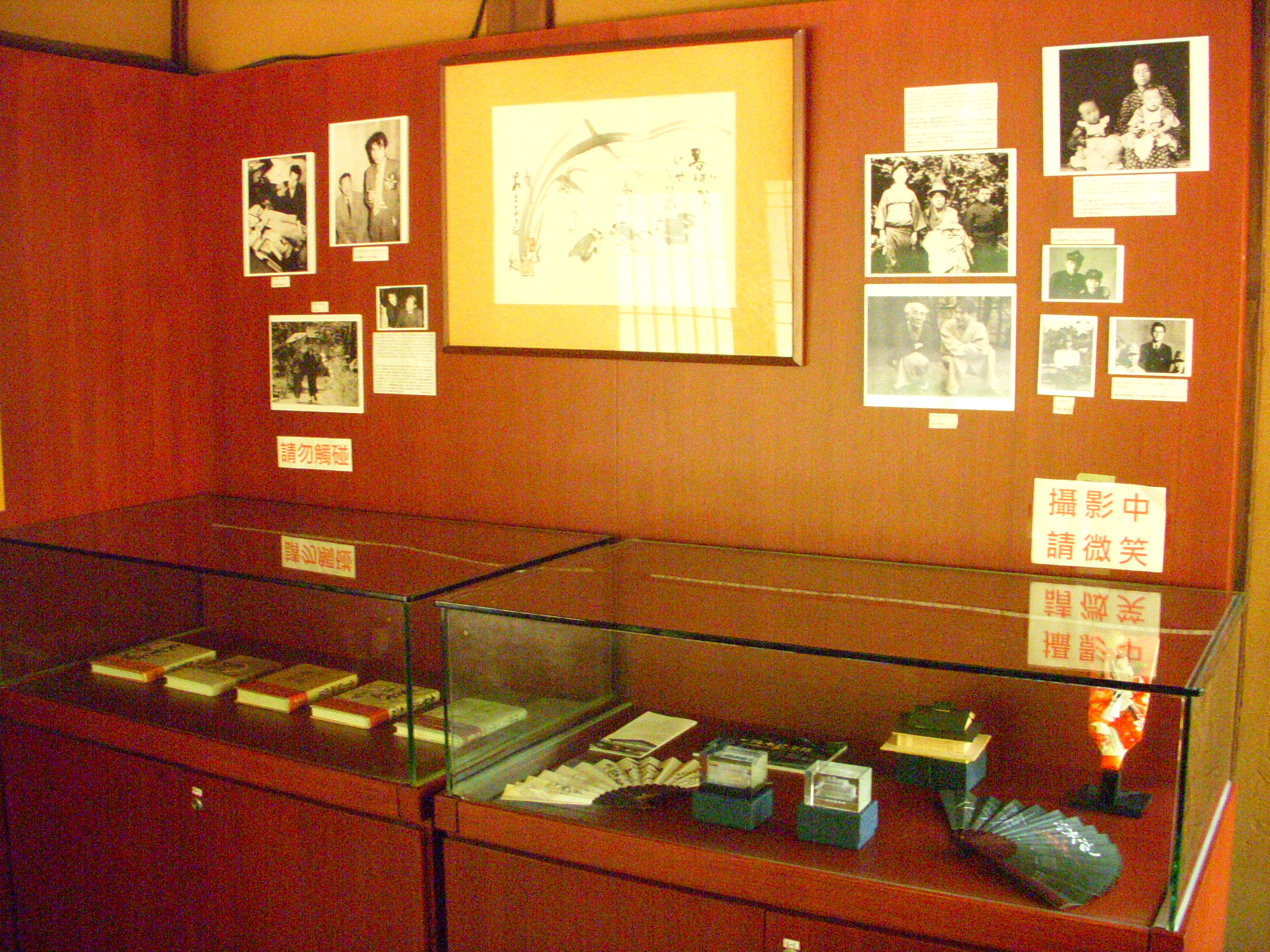
The interior of the Tamsui Itteki Memorial House

The Tamsui Itteki Memorial House (traditional Chinese: 一滴水紀念館; simplified Chinese: 一滴水纪念馆; pinyin: Yī Dī Shuǐ Jìniànguǎn) is a memorial hall in Tamsui District, New Taipei, Taiwan.

== History ==
The memorial hall was opened on 5 April 2011 and inaugurated by New Taipei Mayor Eric Chu.

== Exhibitions ==
The memorial hall houses Tsutomu Mizukami and Chin Shunshin collections to promote exchanges between modern Japanese and Taiwanese literature.

== Transportation ==
The building is accessible north west from Tamsui Station of Taipei Metro. Take Bus-Red 26 to Zonlei temple. Also can take park-traveling bus-836.

== See also ==
- List of tourist attractions in Taiwan
