= Former British Merchant Warehouse =

Warehouse in Tamsui, New Taipei, Taiwan

- 英商嘉士洋行倉庫
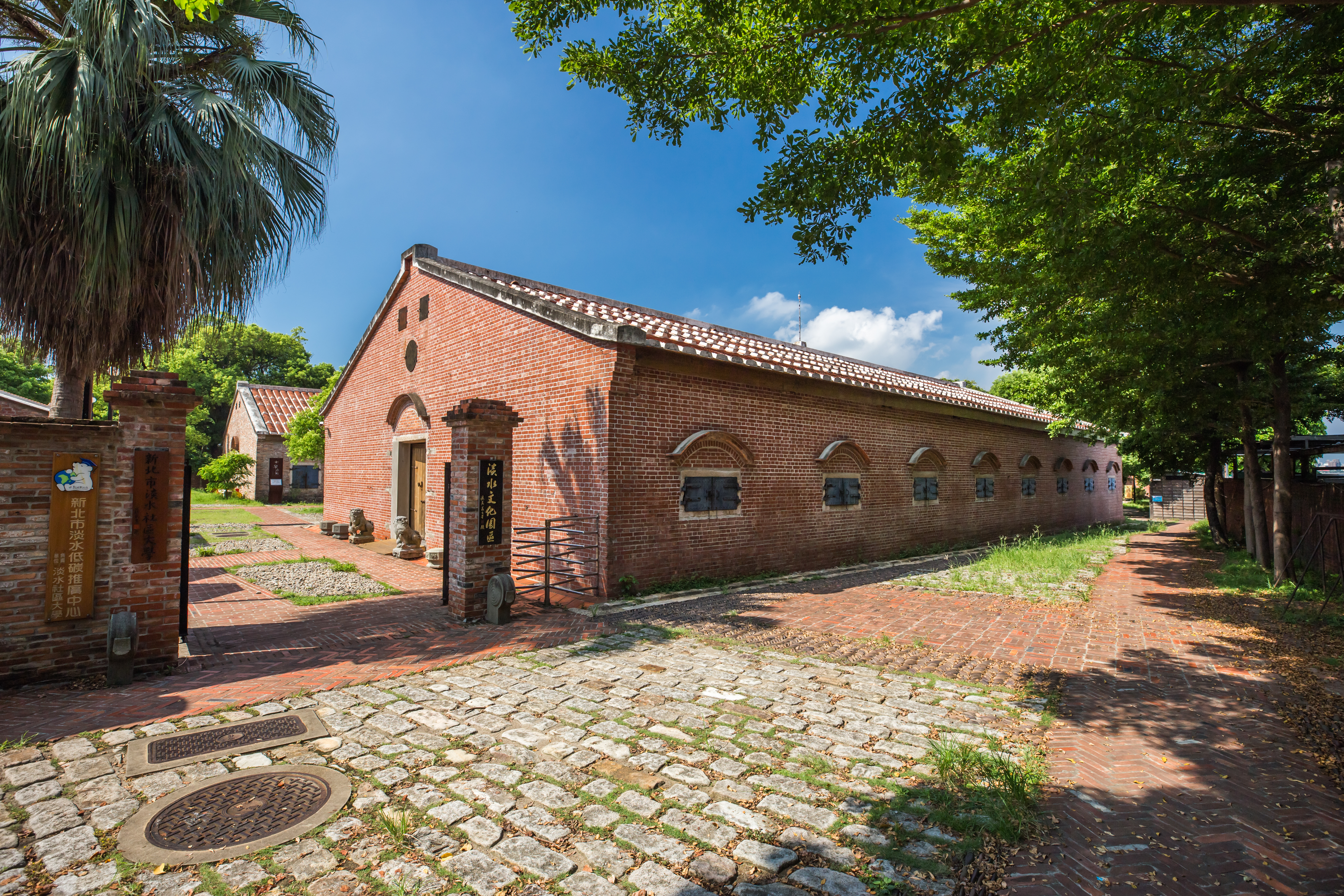
- Interactive map of the Former British Merchant Warehouse area

General information
- Type: former warehouse
- Location: Tamsui, New Taipei, Taiwan
- Coordinates: 25°09′56.4″N 121°26′48.1″E

The Former British Merchant Warehouse (traditional Chinese: 英商嘉士洋行倉庫; simplified Chinese: 英商嘉士洋行仓库; pinyin: Yīngshāng Jiāshì Yángháng Cāngkù) is a historical warehouse in Tamsui District, New Taipei, Taiwan.

== History ==
The area used to be a warehouse to store tea-related products by the British tea merchants. It was then later bought by Shell Oil Company and expanded into four large warehouse and oil tanks. After the bombing by United States in 1944, the warehouse burned for three days and was half destroyed. It was eventually retired as a backup storage since and donated by Shell.

To preserve the historical meaning of the building, the warehouse was repaired. After restoration and remodeling of the area, the Tamsui Cultural Park (Chinese: 淡水文化園區; pinyin: Dànshuǐ Wénhuà Yuánqū) was established.

== Transportation ==
The area is accessible within walking distance south of Tamsui Station of Taipei Metro.

== See also ==
- List of tourist attractions in Taiwan
