= Tamsui Church =

Church in Tamsui, New Taipei, Taiwan

- 淡水禮拜堂
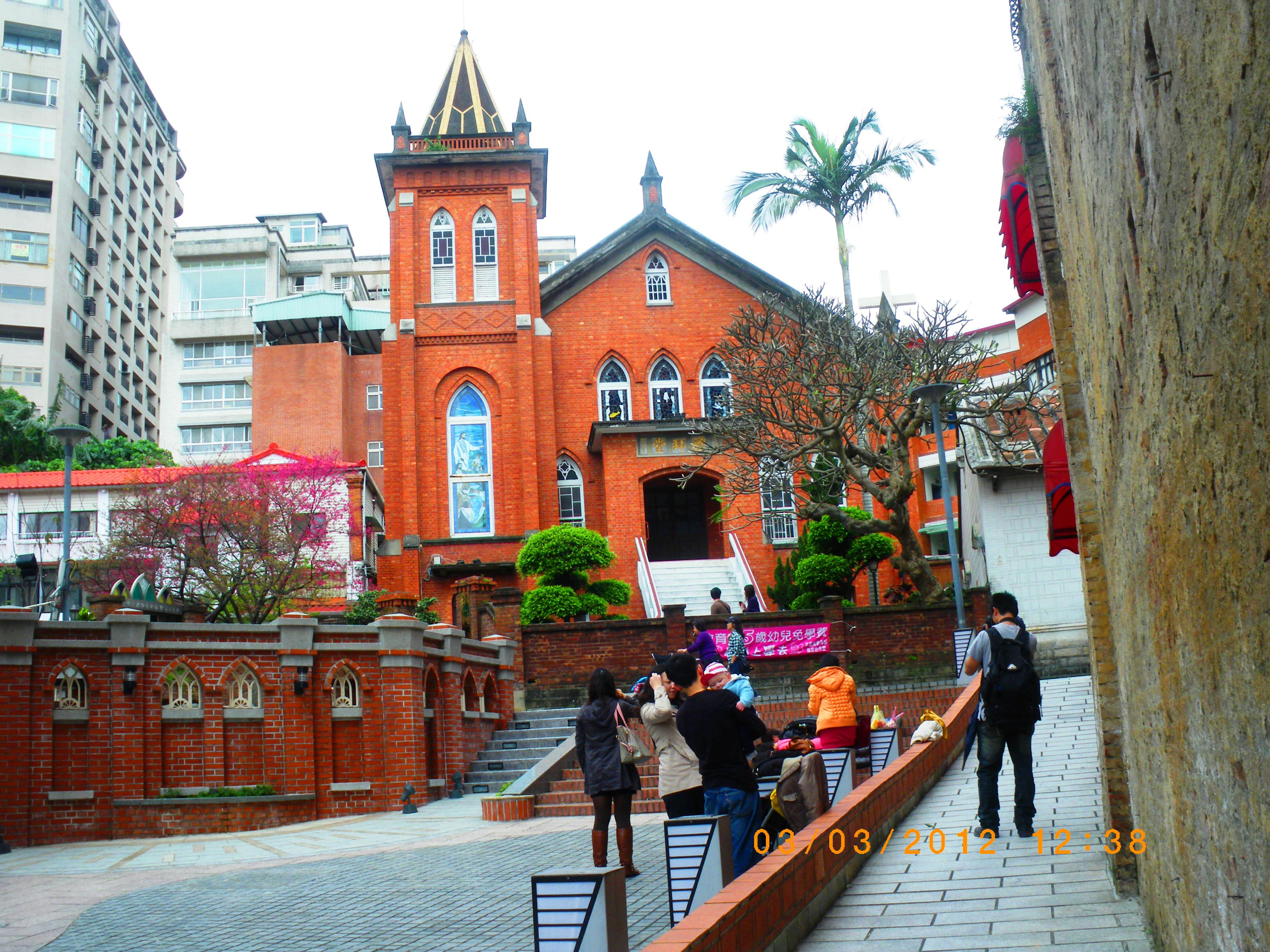

Religion
- Affiliation: Presbyterian

Location
- Location: Tamsui, New Taipei, Taiwan
- Interactive map of Tamsui Church
- Coordinates: 25°10′19.3″N 121°26′18.4″E

Architecture
- Type: church
- Style: gothic
- Completed: 28 November 1933

The Tamsui Church (traditional Chinese: 淡水禮拜堂; simplified Chinese: 淡水礼拜堂; pinyin: Dànshuǐ Lǐbàitáng) is a church in Tamsui District, New Taipei, Taiwan.

== History ==
The current Tamsui Church building was built by Japan. It was then renovated in 1932 due to deterioration and opened by the son of George Leslie Mackay on 28 November 1933. The building was again renovated in 1986.

== Architecture ==
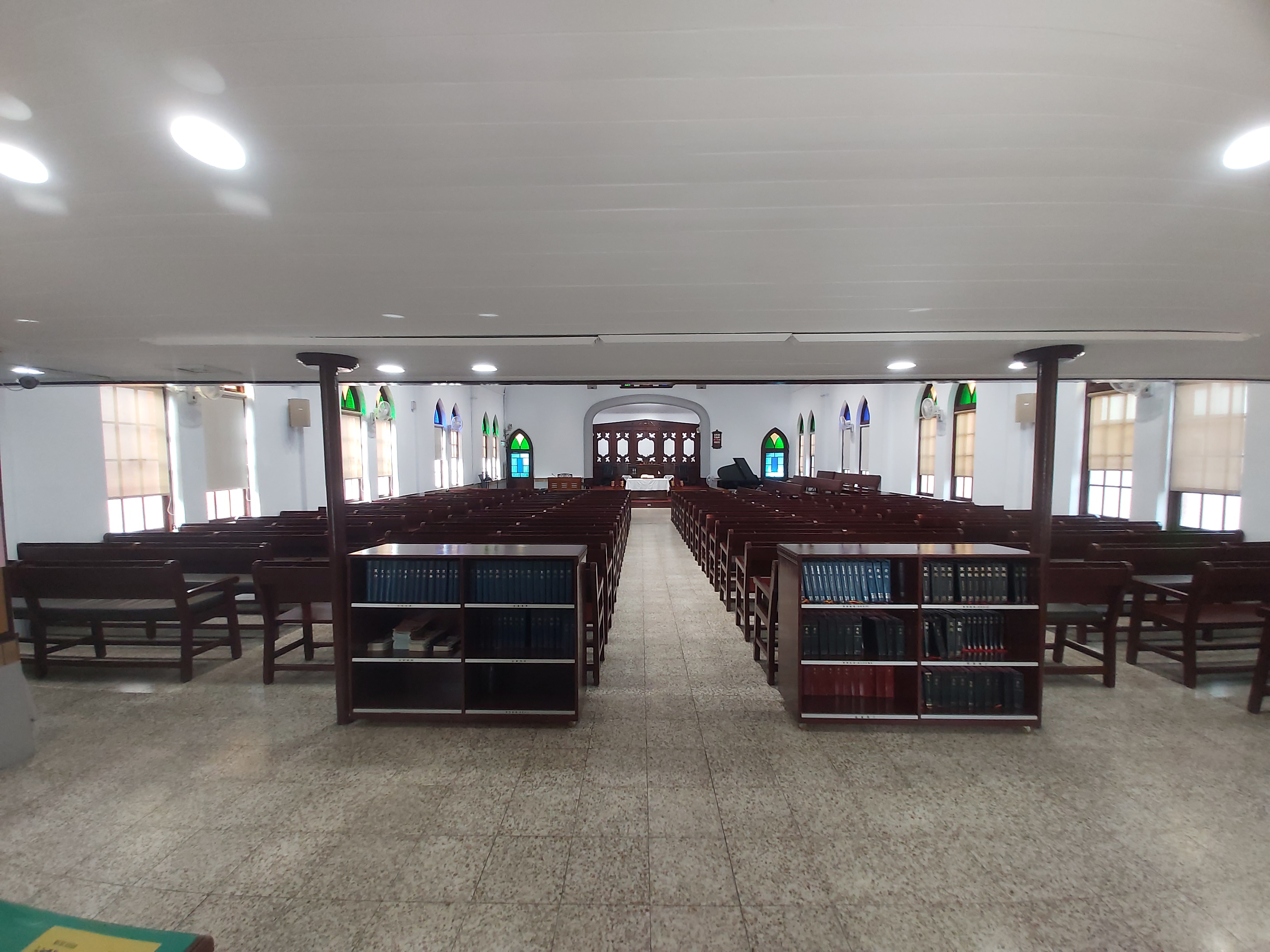
Interior of the Church.

The Tamsui church chapel is a Gothic building, and the clock tower is one of its features. This clock has existed since the completion of the "White Chapel" in 1915. There is no earlier information, only the clock face is cast with "YORK" and "No. 30" et al. Made in the USA.

The sound of this bell is loud and round, and it can be heard even miles away from the coast. The famous Taiwanese ballad "Twilight Song of Tamsui" mentions that "the church bell rings to the sea with an empty heart".

During World War II, this clock was requisitioned by the Japanese government as a siren for the "Street Workplace", and it was erected on the roof of the "Daguanlou" (Red Building). It burst and lost its sound when it was bombed in an air raid, and finally dedicated itself to the residents of Tamsui. The bell was sent back to the church after the war. In 1985, it was installed at the back of the chapel to commemorate it, named "Gospel Bell".

== Transportation ==
The church is accessible within a walking distance northwest of Tamsui Station of Taipei Metro.

== See also ==
- List of tourist attractions in Taiwan
- Christianity in Taiwan
