= Tamsui Historical Museum =

Museum in Tamsui, New Taipei, Taiwan

- 淡水古蹟博物館
- Established: 2005
- Location: Tamsui, New Taipei, Taiwan
- Coordinates: 25°10′43.2″N 121°25′52.7″E
- Type: museum
- Website: Official website

The Tamsui Historical Museum (traditional Chinese: 淡水古蹟博物館; simplified Chinese: 淡水古迹博物馆; pinyin: Dànshuǐ Gǔjī Bówùguǎn) is a museum in Tamsui District, New Taipei, Taiwan.

== History ==
The museum building used to be the British consulate. The museum was established in 2005 by the Taipei County Government.

== Transportation ==
The museum is accessible within walking distance northwest of Tamsui Station of Taipei Metro.

== See also ==
- List of museums in Taiwan
