= Tamsui Art Gallery =

Art gallery in Tamsui, New Taipei, Taiwan

- 淡水藝術工坊
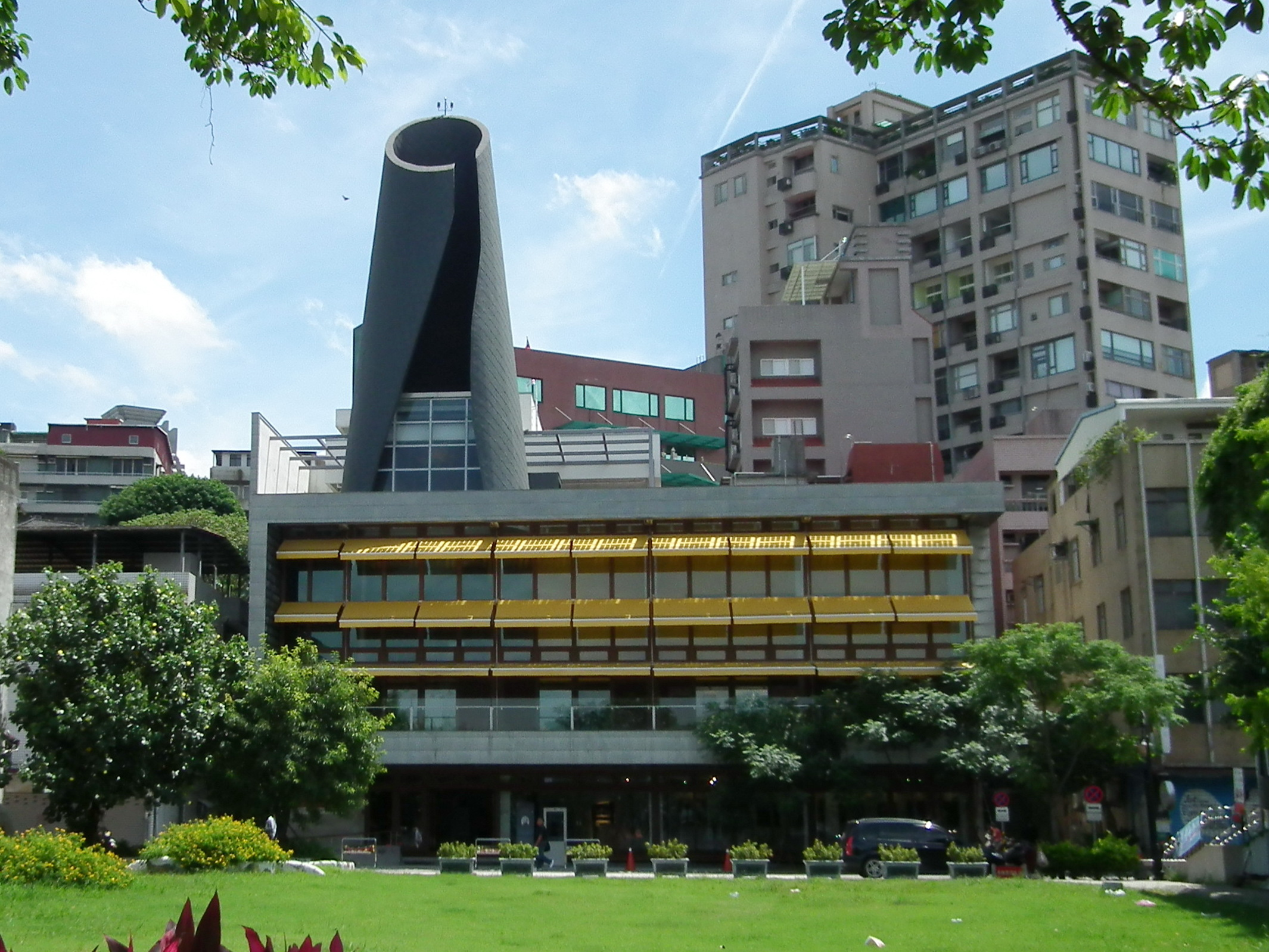
- Interactive map of the Tamsui Art Gallery area

General information
- Type: arts center
- Location: Tamsui, New Taipei, Taiwan
- Coordinates: 25°10′20.4″N 121°26′14.7″E
- Opened: 2011

The Tamsui Art Gallery (TAG; traditional Chinese: 淡水藝術工坊; simplified Chinese: 淡水艺术工坊; pinyin: Dànshuǐ Yìshù Gōngfāng) is an arts center in Tamsui District, New Taipei, Taiwan.

== History ==
The site of the art gallery used to be four Japanese-style dormitories located side by side. The art gallery was opened in 2011.

== Architecture ==
The art gallery uses the tiles which used to be used from the previous dormitories to preserve their history.

== Exhibitions ==
The art gallery exhibits various works by local artists about local history.

== Transportation ==
The art gallery is accessible by bus from Tamsui Station of Taipei Metro.

== See also ==
- List of tourist attractions in Taiwan
