= Tamsui Customs Officers' Residence =

Former residence in Tamsui, New Taipei, Taiwan

- 前清淡水關稅務司官邸
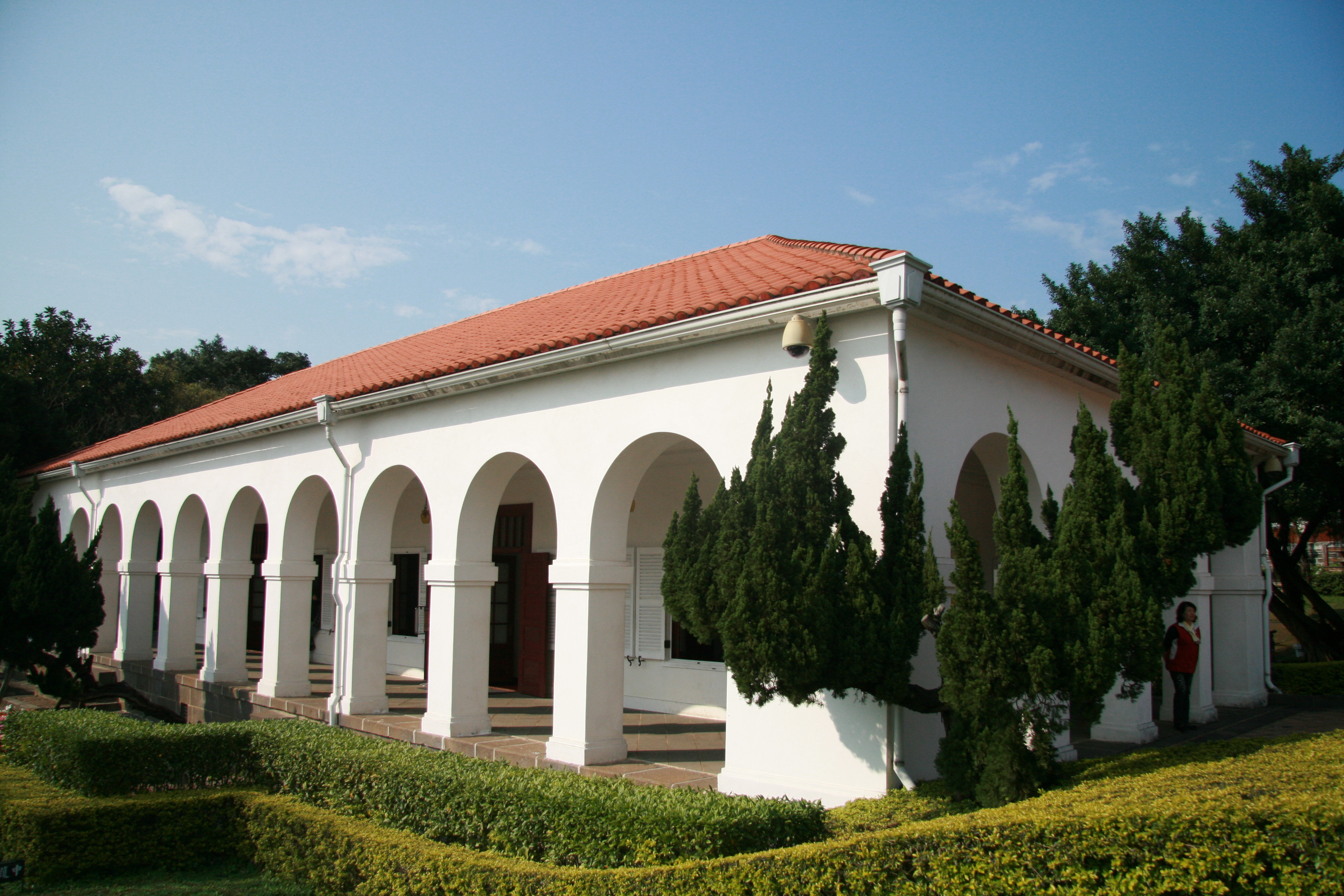
- Interactive map of the Tamsui Customs Officers' Residence area

General information
- Type: former residence
- Location: Tamsui, New Taipei, Taiwan
- Coordinates: 25°10′27.0″N 121°26′10.6″E
- Completed: 1870

The Tamsui Customs Officers' Residence (traditional Chinese: 前清淡水關稅務司官邸; simplified Chinese: 前清淡水关税务司官邸; pinyin: Qiánqīng Dànshuǐ Guān Shuìwù Sī Guāndǐ) is a historical residence in Tamsui District, New Taipei, Taiwan.

== History ==
After Taiwan was forced to open foreign trade in early 1860s, foreigners soon came into the island. Qing Dynasty government soon established a customs office in Tamsui in 1870 after the opening of Tamsui Port.

== Architecture ==
The residence is a white-colored building built in a colonial style nicknamed Little White House (Chinese: 小白宮; pinyin: Xiǎo Báigōng). The building features banquet hall, master room etc.

== Transportation ==
The residence is accessible within walking distance northwest of Tamsui Station of Taipei Metro.

== See also ==
- List of tourist attractions in Taiwan
