= Tamsui Lover's Bridge =

Bridge in Tamsui, New Taipei, Taiwan

Tamsui Lover's Bridge 情人橋
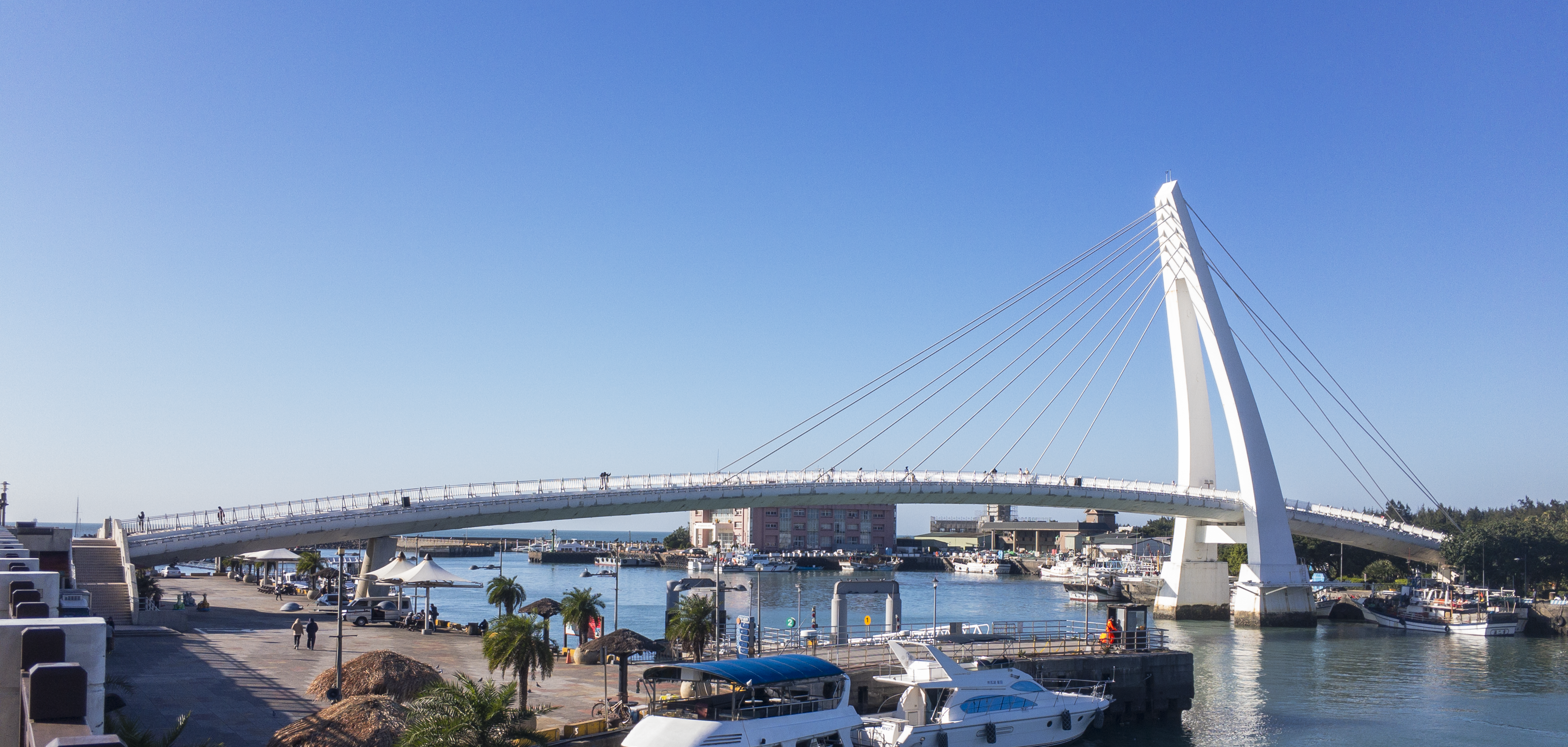
- Coordinates: 25°10′58.9″N 121°24′39.0″E
- Locale: Tamsui, New Taipei, Taiwan

Characteristics
- Design: bridge

History
- Opened: 14 February 2003

Location
- Interactive map of Tamsui Lover's Bridge

The Tamsui Lover's Bridge (traditional Chinese: 情人橋; simplified Chinese: 情人桥; pinyin: Qíngrén Qiáo) is a bridge in Tamsui Fisherman's Wharf, Tamsui District, New Taipei, Taiwan.

== History ==
The bridge was opened on 14 February 2003.

== Architecture ==
The shape of the white-colored bridge resembles the mast and rigging of a sailing ship. There are lamps illuminating the bridge at night.

== See also ==
- List of bridges in Taiwan
- Transportation in Taiwan
