= Tamsui District =

District in New Taipei, Taiwan

Tamsui 淡水區 Tansui, Danshuei, Tanshui, Danshui
- District
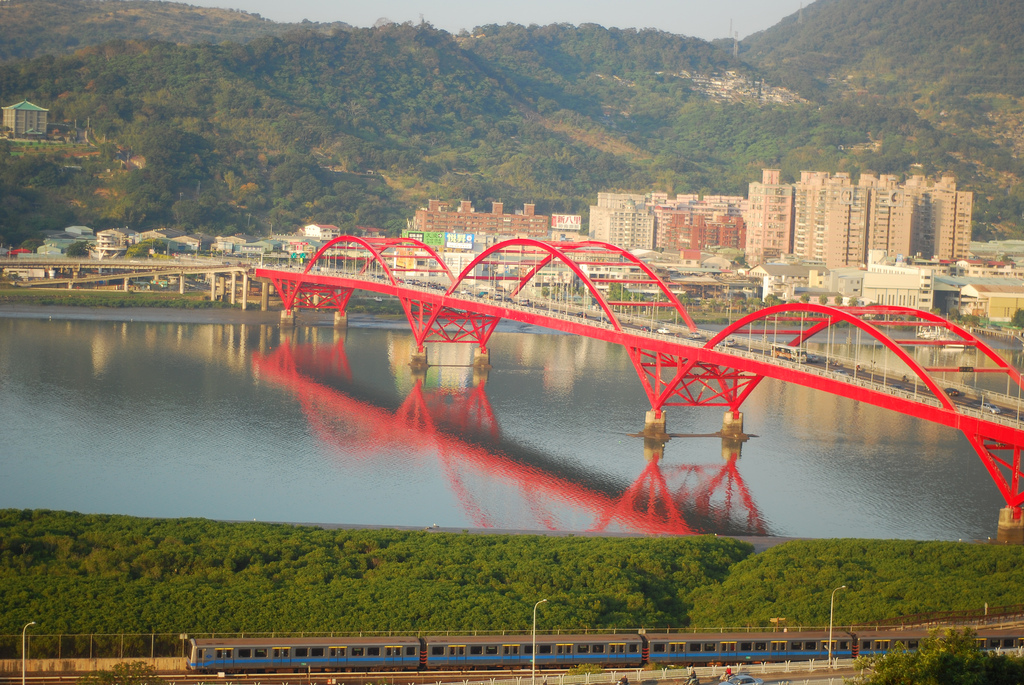
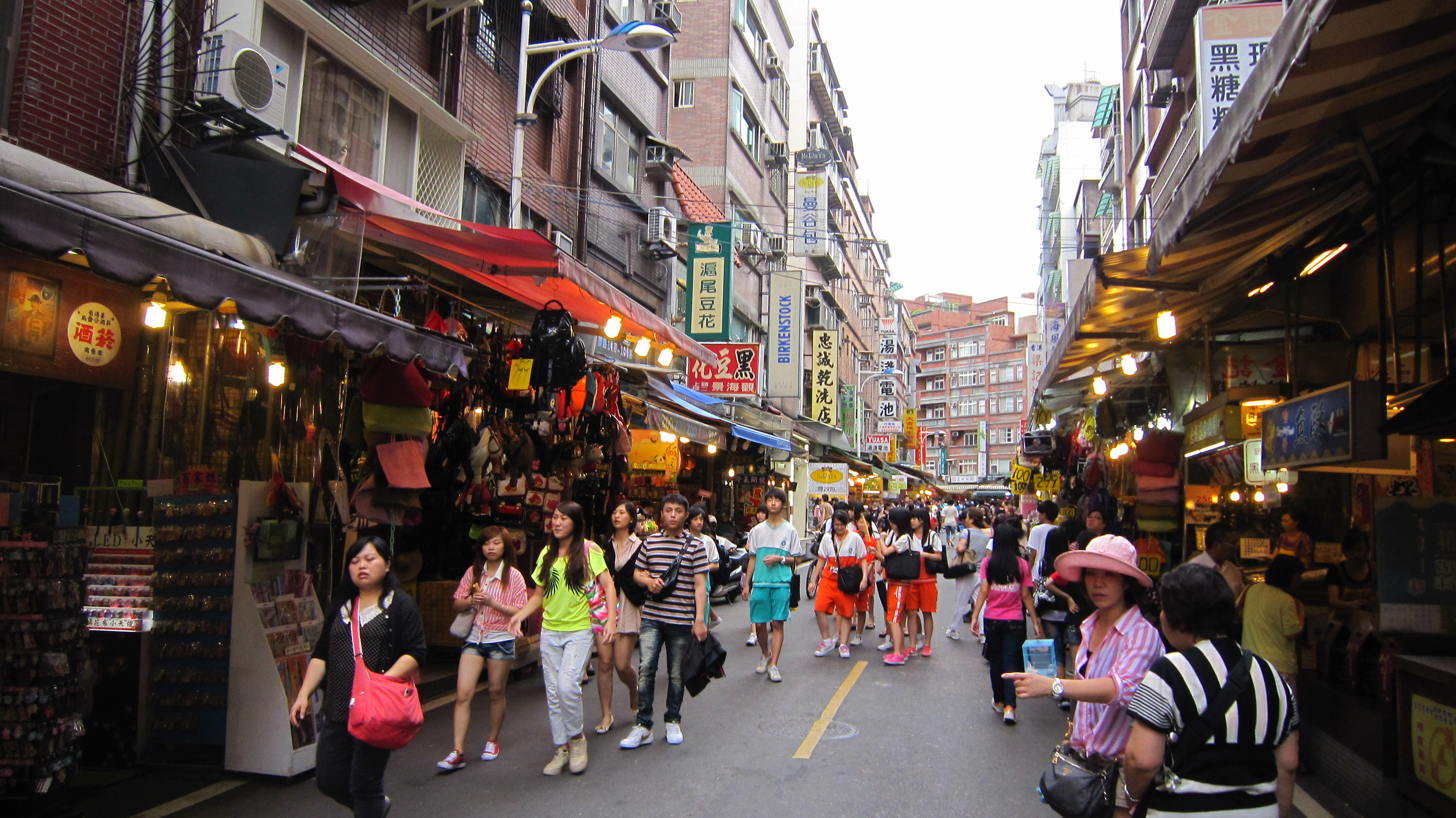
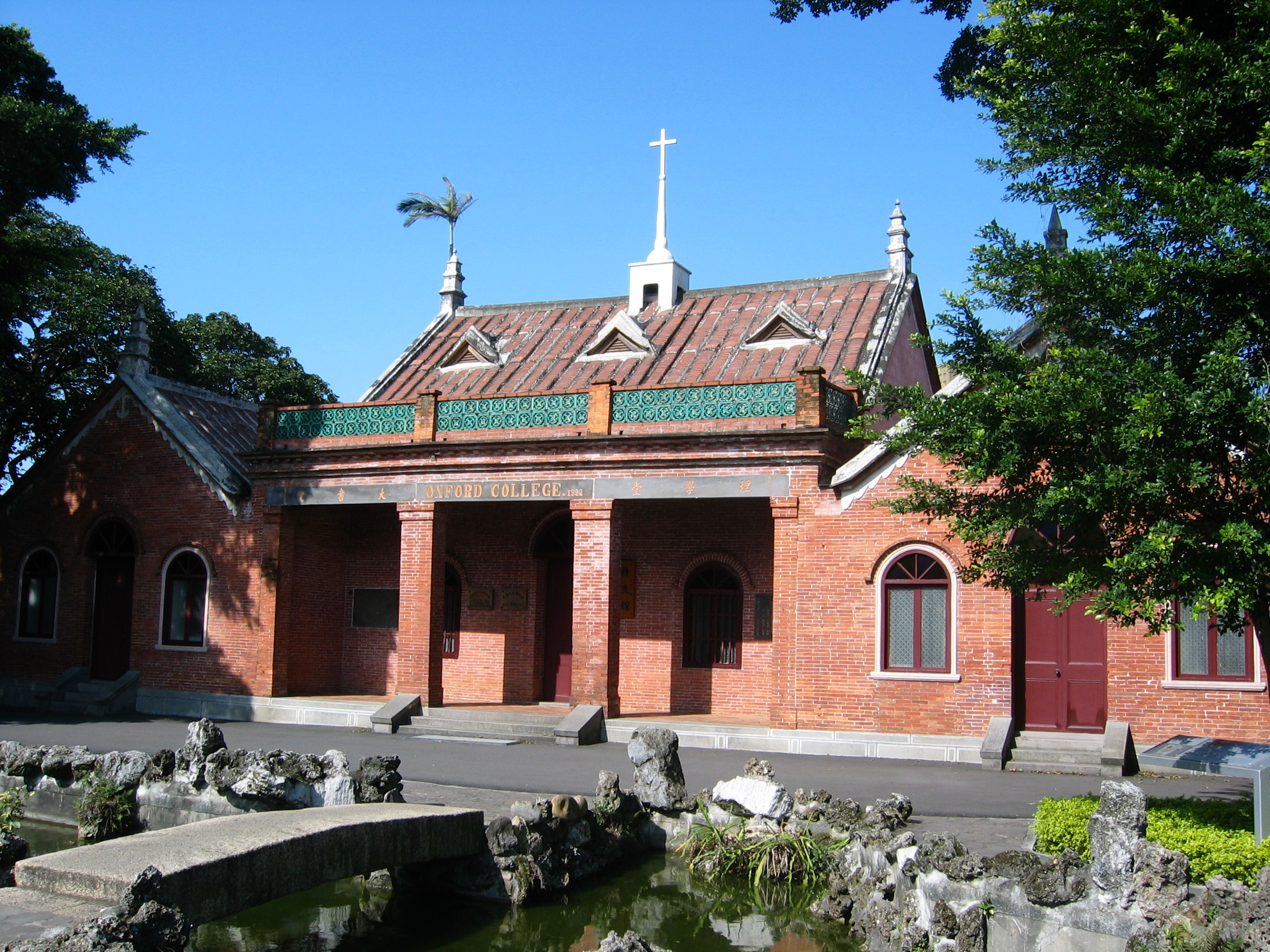
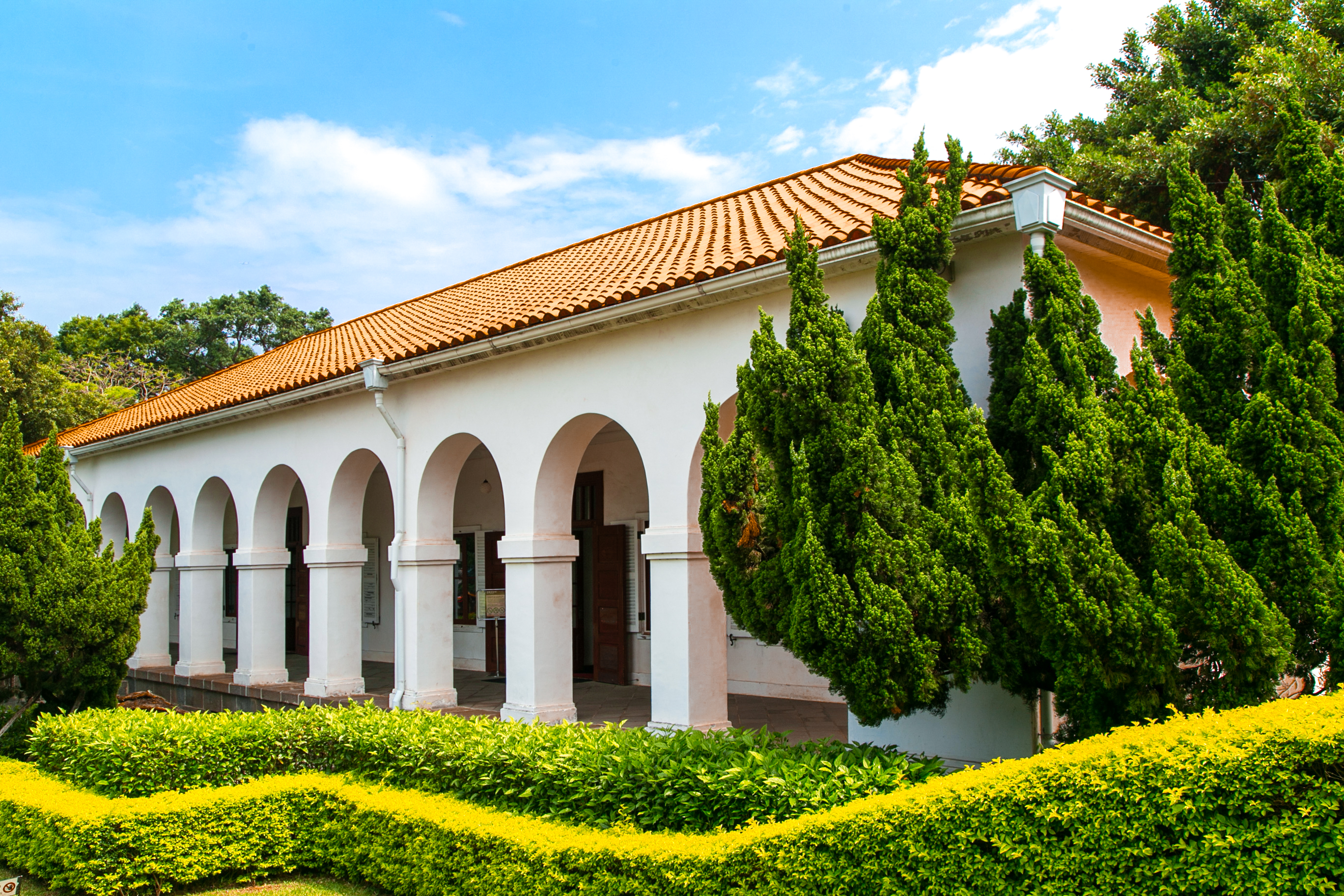
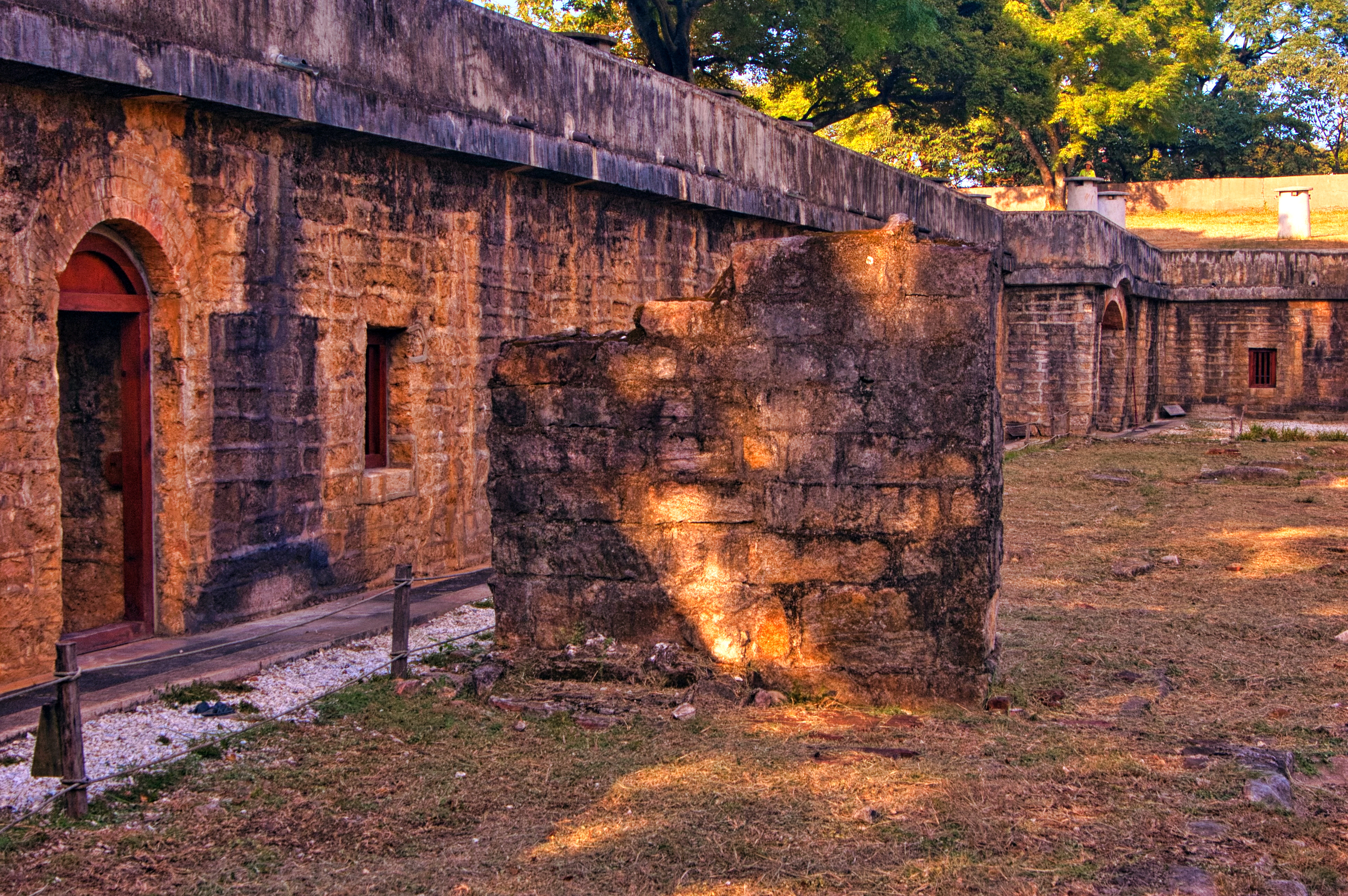
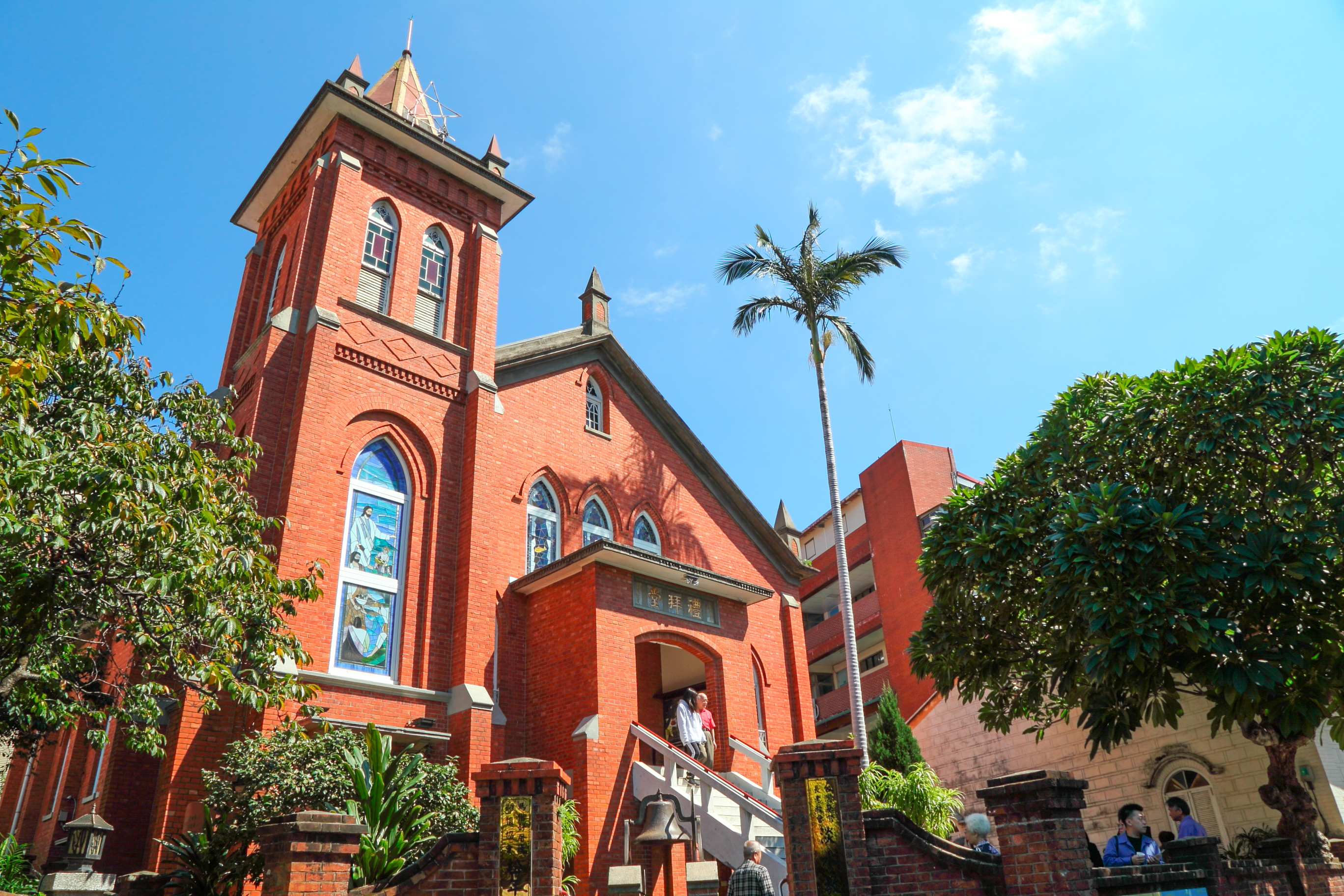
- Clockwise: Fort Santo Domingo; Tamsui Old Street; Tamsui Customs Officers' Residence; Tamsui Church; Hobe Fort; Aletheia University; Guandu Bridge

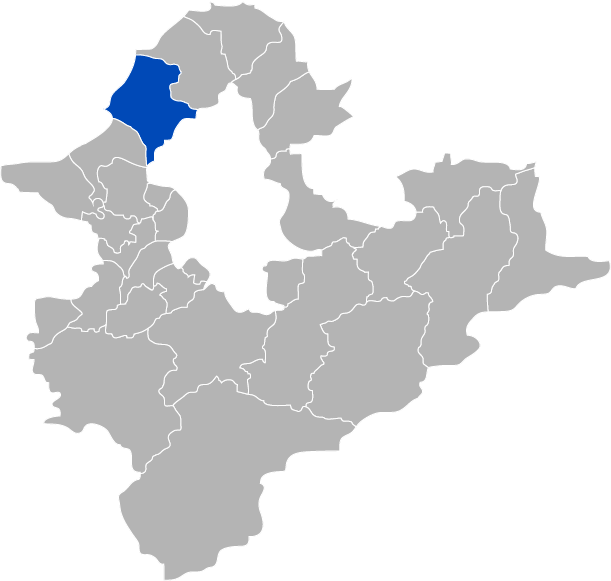
- Tamsui District in New Taipei City
- Coordinates: 25°10′19″N 121°26′38″E
- Country: Republic of China
- Special municipality: New Taipei City, Taiwan

Area
  - Total: 70.65 km^{2} (27.28 sq mi)

Population (May 2025)
  - Total: 205,706
  - Density: 2,911/km^{2} (7,540/sq mi)
- Time zone: +8
- Website: www.tamsui.ntpc.gov.tw/home.jsp?id=fc3450f721db03e1

Tamsui
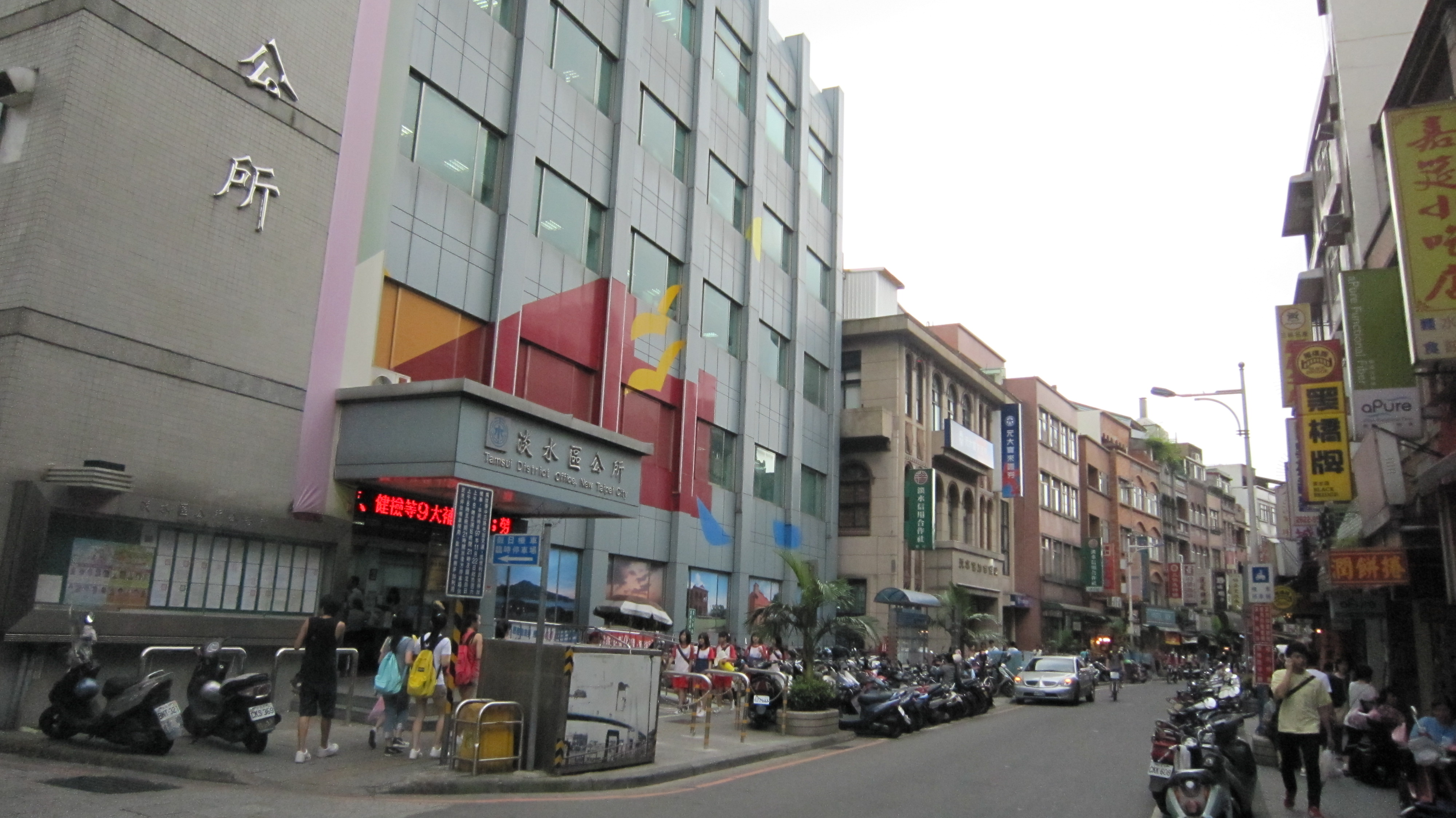
- Tamsui District office

Chinese name
- Chinese: 淡水
- Postal: Tamsui
Transcriptions
Standard Mandarin
- Hanyu Pinyin: Dànshuǐ
- Bopomofo: ㄉㄢˋ ㄕㄨㄟˇ
- Gwoyeu Romatzyh: Dannshoei
- Wade–Giles: Tan^{4}-shui^{3}
- Tongyong Pinyin: Dànshuěi
- Yale Romanization: Dànshwěi
- MPS2: Dànshuěi
- IPA: [tân.ʂwèɪ]
Hakka
- Pha̍k-fa-sṳ: Tham-súi
Yue: Cantonese
- Jyutping: Daam^{6}-sui^{2}
Southern Min
- Hokkien POJ: Tām-chúi
- Tâi-lô: Tām-tsuí

Hobe
- Traditional Chinese: 滬尾
Transcriptions
Standard Mandarin
- Hanyu Pinyin: Hùwěi
- Bopomofo: ㄏㄨˋ ㄨㄟˇ
- Gwoyeu Romatzyh: Huhwoei
- Wade–Giles: Hu^{4}-wei^{3}
- Tongyong Pinyin: Hùwěi
- Yale Romanization: Hùwěi
- MPS2: Hùwěi
- IPA: [xû.wèɪ]
Yue: Cantonese
- Jyutping: Wu^{6}-mei^{5}
Southern Min
- Hokkien POJ: Hō͘-bé

Japanese name
- Kanji: 淡水
- Kana: たんすい
Transcriptions
- Romanization: Tansui

Tamsui District (Chinese: 淡水; pinyin: Dànshuǐ; Pe̍h-ōe-jī: Tām-chúi; Tâi-lô: Tām-tsuí) is a seaside district in New Taipei City, Taiwan adjacent to the Tamsui River and overlooking the Taiwan Strait. The name of the district means "fresh water" in Chinese. Although modest in size (population 205,706), Tamsui plays a significant role in Taiwanese history and culture.

== Name ==
=== Historical ===
The Ketagalan aborigines called the location around modern Tamsui Hoba, meaning "stream's mouth." Hoba transliterated into Taiwanese Hokkien as Hobe. Historical works in English have referred to the place as "Hobe," "Hobé," or "Hobe Village." 17th-century Spanish colonists labeled the region Casidor and the Tamsui River Kimalon. Dutch records reference the names Tamsuy and Tampsui but also refer to another "Lower Tamsuy" in southern Taiwan.

Pastor George Leslie Mackay popularized "Tamsui" as the English-language transliteration in his 1895 book From Far Formosa. "Tamsui" is consistent with Hokkien literary readings, and (possibly by chance) is equal to the Church Romanization of an older pronunciation (Tām-súi) minus tone markings and hyphen. By 1900, the "Tamsui" variant was already well-known and featured prominently in two English-language maps of the area. However, some naming confusion persisted, as evidenced by United States diplomat James W. Davidson's 1903 book The Island of Formosa. Davidson lists "Tamsui, Tamshuy, Tamshui, Tamsoui, [and] Tan-sui" as acceptable spellings and pronunciations.

Historically, the term "Tamsui" is ambiguous, as "it may mean the harbor, the river, the village of Hobe, Twatutia, or Banka, and it may mean the whole district."

=== Modern ===
From 1950 until the 2010 creation of New Taipei City, Tamsui was officially "Tamsui Township" (Chinese: 淡水鎮; Pe̍h-ōe-jī: Tām-chúi-tìn; Tâi-lô: Tām-tsuí-tìn) in the former Taipei County. The spelling "Danshui" (from Pinyin Dànshuǐ), formerly used officially by the Taiwan government, Taipei Metro, and other sources, is based on the Mandarin pronunciation. Having long used "Tamsui" as the official English name, the local government of the district informed the national government in 2011 that "Tamsui" rather than "Danshui" should be used in English.

== History ==
=== Spanish colony ===
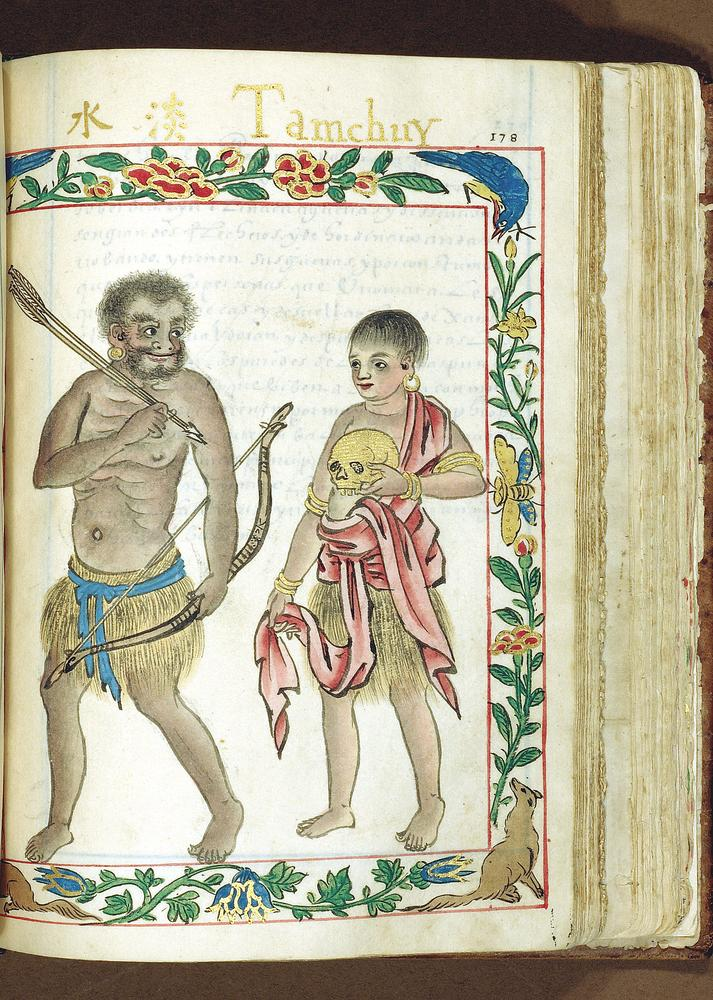
Taiwanese natives in Tamsui under Spanish Formosa

The Spanish arrived in the area of Tamsui in the early 17th century. In the fall of 1629, the Spanish established the first major non-aboriginal settlement comprising the town and mission of Santo Domingo. The Spanish occupied northern Taiwan for the purpose of securing Spanish sea trade routes from coastal Fujian to Spanish Philippines against the Dutch (who were already established in the South of Taiwan by then), the British, and the Portuguese, as well as for facilitating trade with China and Japan.

In 1642, the Spanish were expelled from Taiwan by the Dutch. The Spanish had already abandoned their settlement in Tamsui in 1638 and the Dutch built a new fort over the ruins of Fort Santo Domingo which they renamed Fort Antonio (after the Governor-General of the Dutch East India Company Antonio van Diemen). It is today known as Angmng Siaⁿ (Chinese: 紅毛城; Pe̍h-ōe-jī: Âng-mn̂g-siâⁿ; lit. 'red-hair fortress') and is the main building of the Fort Santo Domingo museum complex. In addition to "pacifying" the aboriginal tribes in the area, the Dutch also encouraged the immigration and settlement of the area by Han Chinese, as well as expanding the production and trade of sulfur, animal skins, and other indigenous resources.

The Dutch left Fort Zeelandia in Taiwan in 1662 following their defeat by Koxinga at the Siege of Fort Zeelandia, who continued the policy of increasing Han Chinese immigration until the surrender of his grandson Zheng Keshuang to the Qing Dynasty in 1683. In 1668, the Dutch left Keelung after getting harassed by aboriginals from Tamsui.

=== Qing dynasty ===
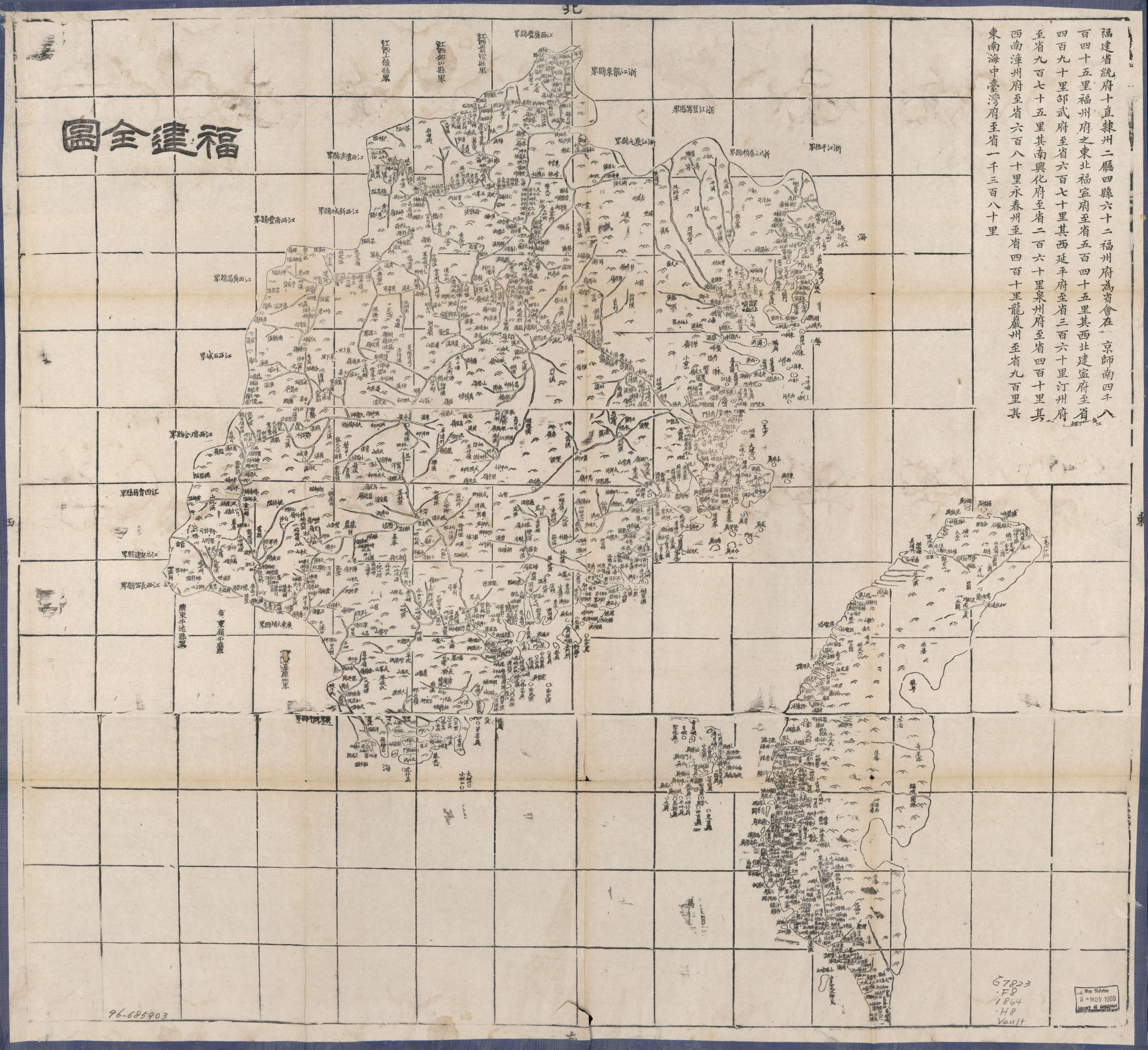
Tamsui (淡水)

Because of its proximity to mainland China, as well as its location in a natural harbor, Tamsui quickly became a major fishing and trade port. The Qing naval patrol also established an outpost in Tamsui in 1808. In 1862, the Qing government opened Tamsui to foreign trade under the terms of the Treaty of Tientsin, exporting tea, camphor, sulfur, coal, opium, and dyes. By the mid-19th century Tamsui had become the largest port in Taiwan, boasting a sizable foreign population as well as a British consulate at Fort Santo Domingo. (Note: The consulate was closed on 13 March 1972 and returned to the authorities in 1980. See Sino-British relations.)

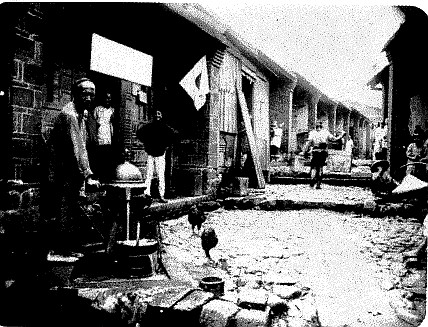
Tamsui in 1895.

Canadian medical doctor and missionary George Leslie Mackay arrived in Tamsui on 9 March 1872, proceeding to establish Taiwan's first hospitals in Western medicine and formal educational facilities, including Oxford College (now part of Aletheia University), the oldest European-style higher-education institution in Taiwan by some measure.

During the Sino-French War the French attempted an invasion of Taiwan during the Keelung Campaign. Liu Mingchuan, who was leading the defence of Taiwan, recruited Aboriginals to serve alongside the Chinese soldiers in fighting against the French. The French were defeated at the Battle of Tamsui, and the Qing forces pinned the French down at Keelung in an eight-month-long campaign before the French withdrew.

In 1884, the harbour of Tamsui was blockaded by the French Navy under the command of Admiral Amédée Courbet, during the Sino-French War. The French were defeated at the Battle of Tamsui by the Chinese and, according to traditional accounts, with the divine assistance of the Goddess Mazu.

=== Japanese rule ===
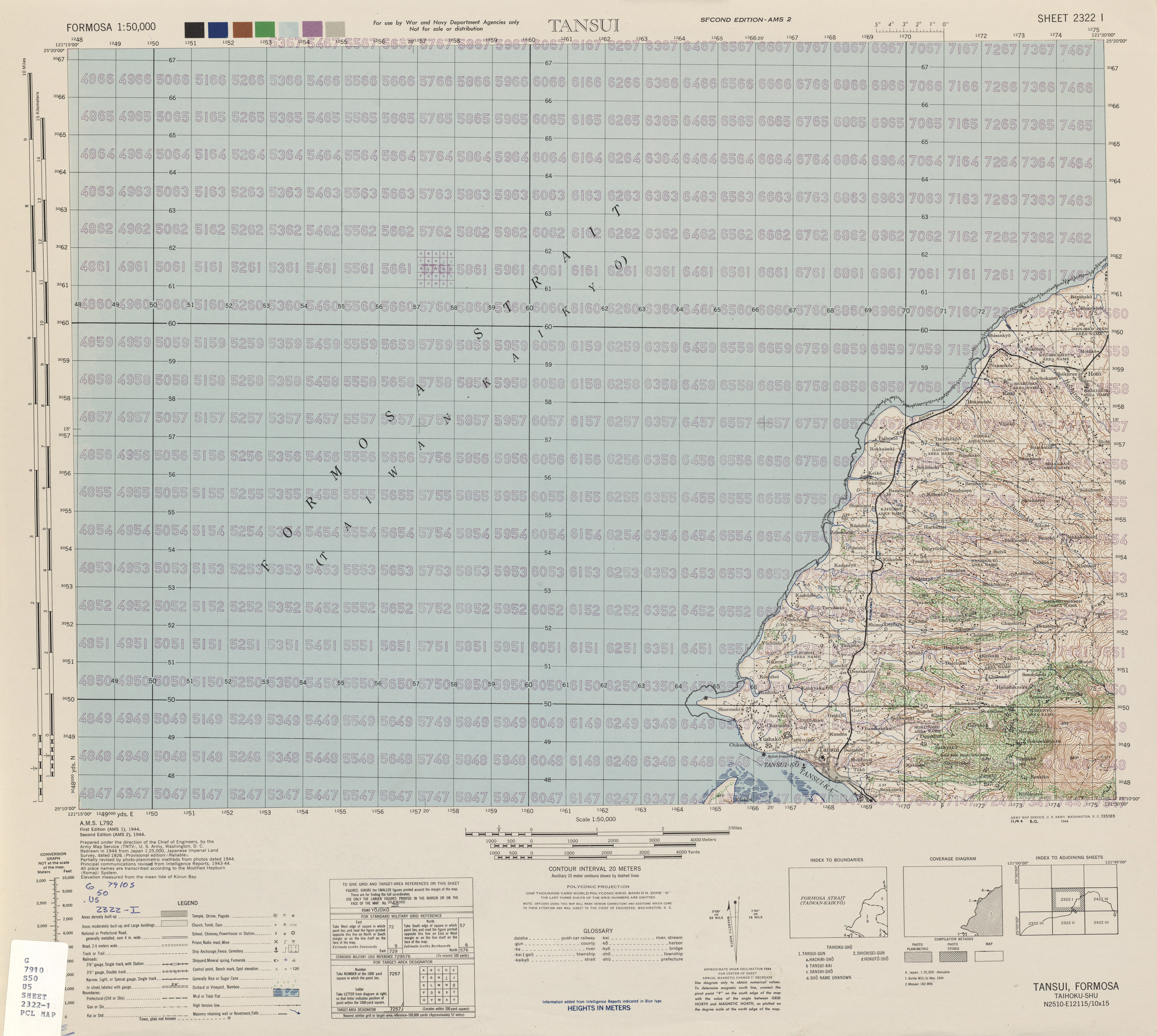
Map of northwest Tamsui (labeled as Tansui) and surrounding area (1944)

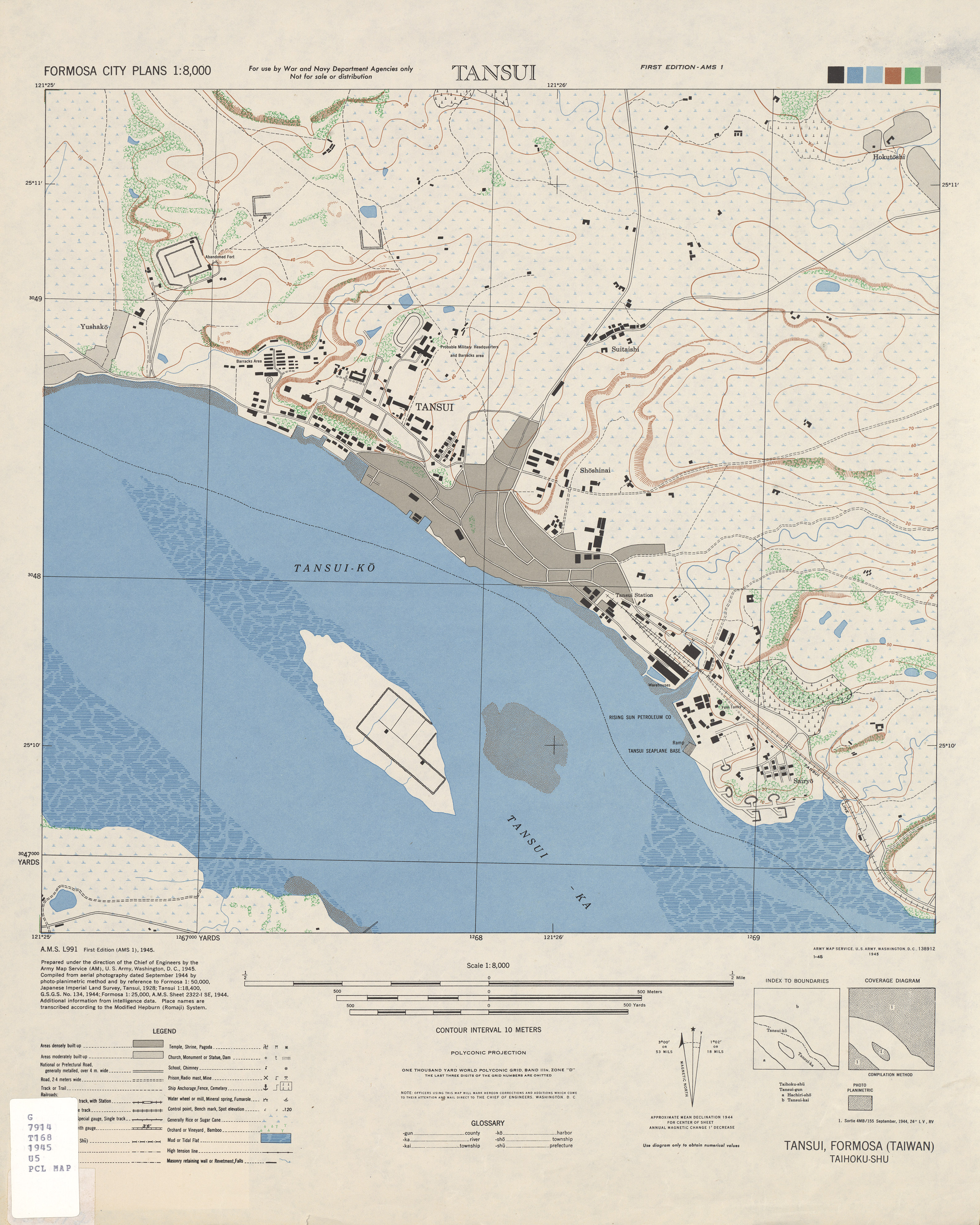
Map of Tamsui town (labeled as Tansui), Tamsui River and surroundings (1945)

By the time Taiwan was ceded to Japan following the end of the Sino-Japanese War in 1895, Tamsui's position as a seaport was beginning to wane due to the accumulation of sediments in the Tamsui River. By the 20th century, most of Tamsui's port operations had moved to Keelung, and the local economy had switched primarily to agriculture. However, public infrastructure construction projects by the Japanese led to Tamsui's rise as a local administrative and cultural center.

In the early years of Japanese rule (1895–1945), the population of the city was nearly 6,000. From 1920, under the prefecture system, Tamsui was called Tansui Town (淡水街), and was governed under Tansui District of Taihoku Prefecture.

=== Post-war ===
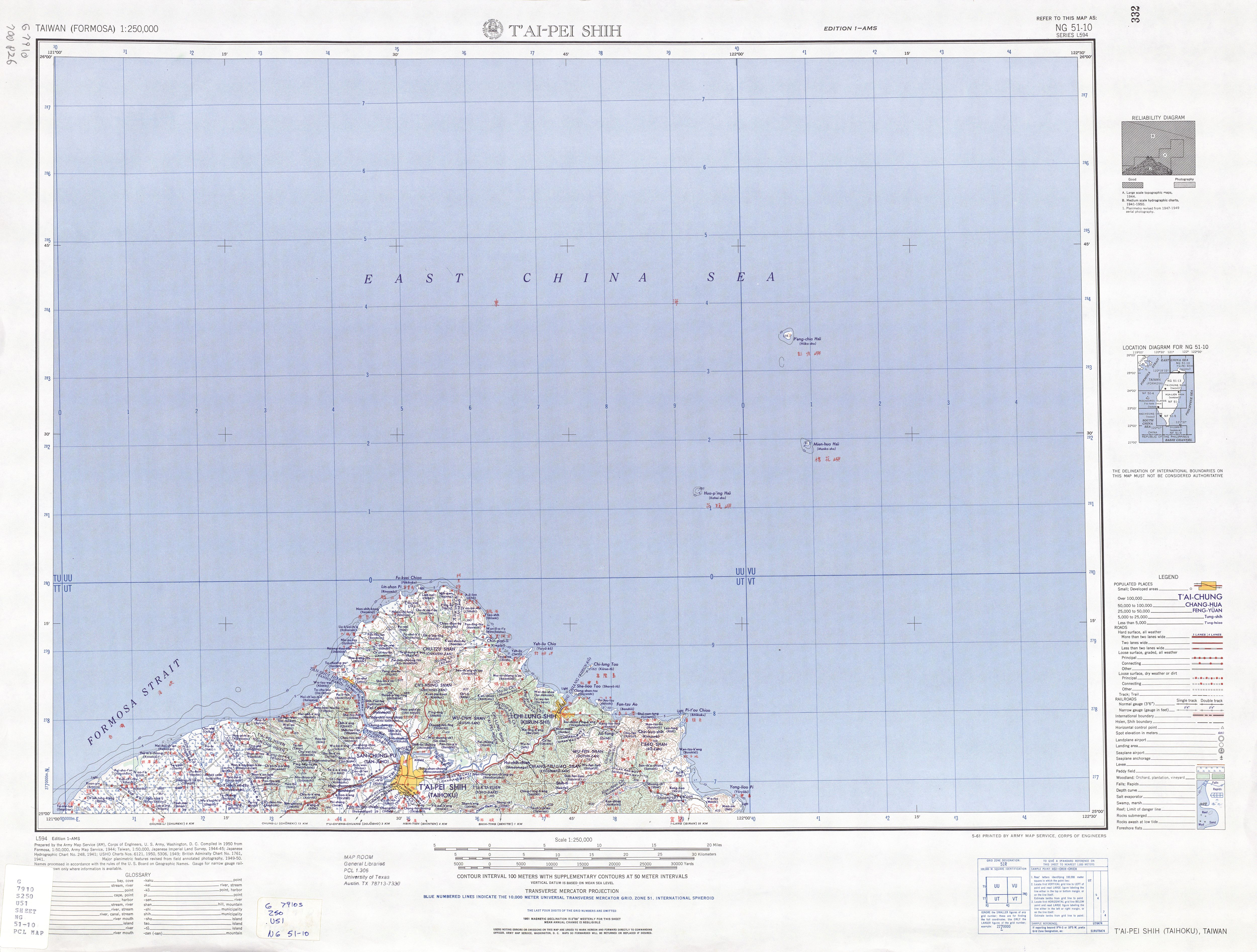
Map of northern Tamsui (labeled as Tan-shui (Tansui) 淡水) (1950)

Following the end of World War II in 1945, Tamsui reverted to being a small fishing town as township of Taipei County. With the expansion of nearby Taipei City, Tamsui slowly became a center for tourism along Taiwan's northwest coast. In the last ten years, the city has become popular as a suburb of Taipei in the local real estate market.

Following the completion of the Taipei Metro's Tamsui Line in 1997, the town experienced a sharp increase in tourist traffic, reflected in the completion of several riverside parks, the growth of open-air markets specializing in traditional handicrafts and street-stall snacks, the construction of a fisherman's wharf, and the increase in passenger ferries traversing across and along the river.

The Tamsui Estuary is considered militarily significant. The local military drills on planting naval mines in the waterway.

== Administrative divisions ==
Tamsui District administers forty-two urban villages (里).

Division	Chinese	Romanization (from Tongyong Pinyin)	Romanization (from Hanyu Pinyin)	Romanization (from Wade–Giles)	Population (2010)
Urban villages	中和里	Jhonghe	Zhonghe	Chung-ho	693
Urban villages	屯山里	Tunshan	Tunshan		1,229
Urban villages	賢孝里	Siansiao	Xianxiao	Hsien-hsiao	1,736
Urban villages	興仁里	Singren	Xingren	Hsing-jen	1,749
Urban villages	蕃薯里	Fanshu	Fanshu	Fan-shu	1,076
Urban villages	義山里	Yishan	Yishan	I-shan	2,820
Urban villages	忠山里	Jhongshan	Zhongshan	Chung-shan	1,026
Urban villages	崁頂里	Kanding	Kanding	K’an-ting	2,632
Urban villages	埤島里	Pidao	Pidao	P’i-tao	1,312
Urban villages	新興里	Sinsing	Xinxing	Hsin-hsing	6,547
Urban villages	水碓里	Shueiduei	Shuidui	Shui-tui	6,304
Urban villages	北投里	Beitou	Beitou	Pei-t’ou	5,779
Urban villages	水源里	Shueiyuan	Shuiyuan	Shui-yüan	2,516
Urban villages	忠寮里	Jhongliao	Zhongliao	Chung-liao	1,354
Urban villages	樹興里	Shusing	Shuxing	Shu-hsing	1,165
Urban villages	坪頂里	Pingding	Pingding	P’ing-ting	1,411
Urban villages	福德里	Fude	Fude	Fu-te	6,574
Urban villages	竹圍里	Jhuwei	Zhuwei	Chu-wei	6,322
Urban villages	民生里	Minsheng	Minsheng	Min-sheng	6,774
Urban villages	八勢里	Bashih	Bashi	Pa-shih	4,374
Urban villages	竿蓁里	Ganjhen	Ganzhen	Kan-chen	7,890
Urban villages	鄧公里	Denggong	Denggong		6,355
Urban villages	中興里	Jhongsing	Zhongxing	Chung-hsing	4,613
Urban villages	長庚里	Changgeng	Changgeng		1,686
Urban villages	清文里	Cingwun	Qingwen		1,320
Urban villages	草東里	Caodong	Caodong		901
Urban villages	協元里	Sieyuan	Xieyuan		1,749
Urban villages	永吉里	Yongji	Yongji		1,018
Urban villages	民安里	Min-an	Minan/Min'an		930
Urban villages	新生里	Sinsheng	Xinsheng	Hsin-sheng	999
Urban villages	文化里	Wunhua	Wenhua		2,133
Urban villages	油車里	Youche	Youche	Yu-ch’e	5,628
Urban villages	沙崙里	Shalun	Shalun	Sha-lun	3,499
Urban villages	新義里	Sinyi	Xinyi	Hsin-i	4,658
Urban villages	新春里	Sinchun	Xinchun		6,870
Urban villages	新民里	Sinmin	Xinmen	Hsin-min	4,960
Urban villages	正德里	Jhengde	Zhengde	Cheng-te	4,482
Urban villages	北新里	Beisin	Beixin	Pei-hsin	2,907
Urban villages	民權里	Mincyuan	Minquan	Min-ch’uan/Min-ch’üan	3,940
Urban villages	幸福里	Singfu	Xingfu	Hsing-fu	4,742
Urban villages	學府里	Syuefu	Xuefu		4,357
Urban villages	大庄里	Dajhuang	Dazhuang		4,451

== Climate ==
Climate data for Tamsui District (1991–2020 normals, extremes 1942–present）
Month	Jan	Feb	Mar	Apr	May	Jun	Jul	Aug	Sep	Oct	Nov	Dec	Year
Record high °C (°F)	28.4 (83.1)	29.0 (84.2)	31.9 (89.4)	33.6 (92.5)	35.8 (96.4)	37.3 (99.1)	38.8 (101.8)	38.5 (101.3)	37.4 (99.3)	35.8 (96.4)	32.8 (91.0)	30.5 (86.9)	38.8 (101.8)
Mean daily maximum °C (°F)	18.8 (65.8)	19.3 (66.7)	21.6 (70.9)	25.4 (77.7)	28.8 (83.8)	31.3 (88.3)	33.3 (91.9)	33.1 (91.6)	30.9 (87.6)	27.1 (80.8)	24.4 (75.9)	20.6 (69.1)	26.2 (79.2)
Daily mean °C (°F)	15.4 (59.7)	15.7 (60.3)	17.7 (63.9)	21.4 (70.5)	24.7 (76.5)	27.3 (81.1)	29.0 (84.2)	28.7 (83.7)	26.9 (80.4)	23.6 (74.5)	21.0 (69.8)	17.3 (63.1)	22.4 (72.3)
Mean daily minimum °C (°F)	12.7 (54.9)	13.0 (55.4)	14.7 (58.5)	18.3 (64.9)	21.6 (70.9)	24.2 (75.6)	25.7 (78.3)	25.5 (77.9)	23.8 (74.8)	20.9 (69.6)	18.3 (64.9)	14.6 (58.3)	19.4 (66.9)
Record low °C (°F)	2.3 (36.1)	3.2 (37.8)	3.1 (37.6)	6.7 (44.1)	13.4 (56.1)	15.4 (59.7)	20.4 (68.7)	19.6 (67.3)	15.5 (59.9)	10.6 (51.1)	7.6 (45.7)	4.2 (39.6)	2.3 (36.1)
Average precipitation mm (inches)	105.9 (4.17)	148.0 (5.83)	153.4 (6.04)	157.6 (6.20)	239.8 (9.44)	257.4 (10.13)	119.8 (4.72)	218.3 (8.59)	290.1 (11.42)	165.8 (6.53)	104.2 (4.10)	112.4 (4.43)	2,072.7 (81.6)
Average precipitation days (≥ 0.1 mm)	13.9	13.8	15.2	13.6	12.6	12.2	8.3	10.9	11.8	12.3	12.4	12.5	149.5
Average relative humidity (%)	80.8	82.4	81.0	79.9	79.2	79.9	75.0	76.0	76.1	77.8	78.5	79.0	78.8
Mean monthly sunshine hours	83.1	80.4	92.7	105.9	135.6	155.9	226.9	208.6	171.7	127.5	101.9	84.1	1,574.3
Source: Central Weather Administration

== Education ==
- Aletheia University
- St. John's University
- Tamkang University
- Taipei University of Marine Technology
- New Taipei Municipal Tam-Shui Vocational High School
- New Taipei Municipal Zhuwei High School
- Tamshui Junior High School

== Tourist attractions ==
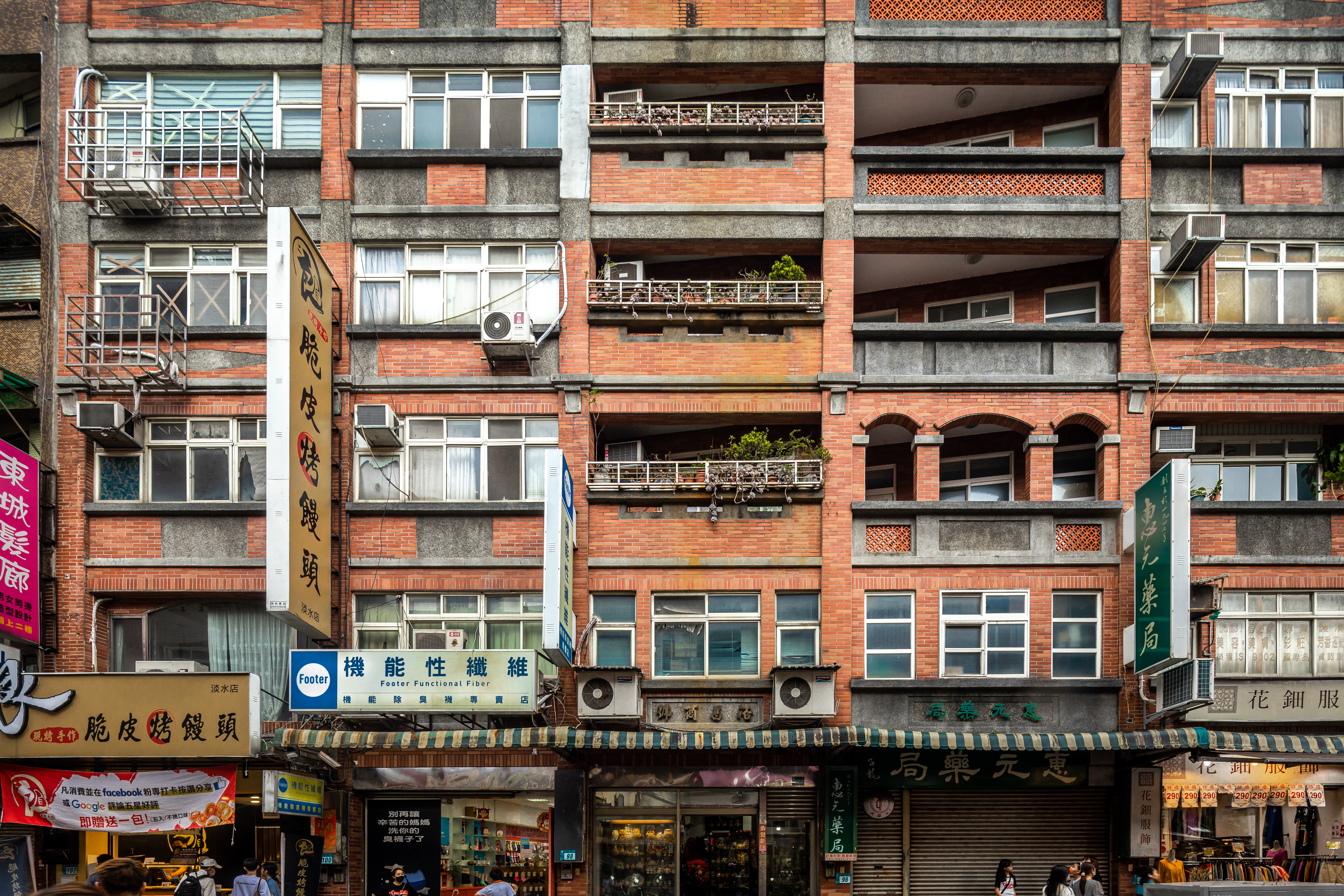
Shophouses along Zhongzheng road

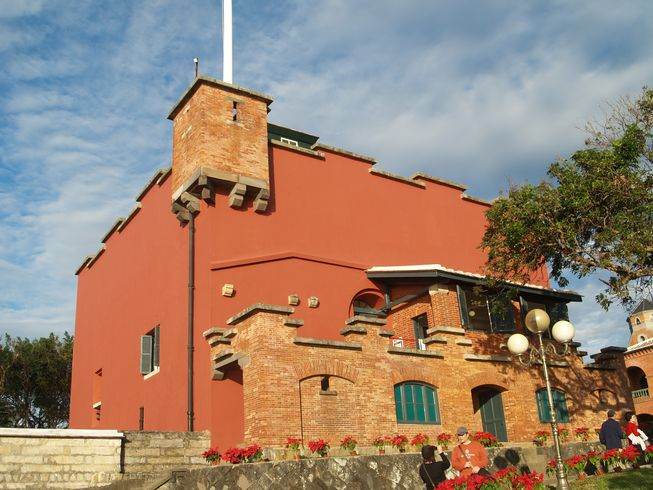
Fort Santo Domingo

- Drop of Water Memorial Hall
- Former British Merchant Warehouse
- Fort Santo Domingo
- Hobe Fort
- Museum of Tamsui Fishiegoodies
- Tamsui Art Gallery
- Tamsui Church
- Tamsui Customs Officers' Residence
- Tamsui Customs Wharf
- Tamsui Fisherman's Wharf
- Tamsui Fuyou Temple
- Tamsui Historical Museum
- Tamsui Lover's Bridge
- Tamsui Lovers' Tower
- Tamsui Lungshan Temple
- Tamsui Meteorological Observatory
- Tamsui Old Street
- Tamsui Qingshui Temple
- Tamsui Qingshui Deity's Grand Procession, on 6th day of 5th lunar month, an important fiesta for Tamsui District
- Tamsui Red Castle
- Teng Feng Fish Ball Museum

== Transportation ==
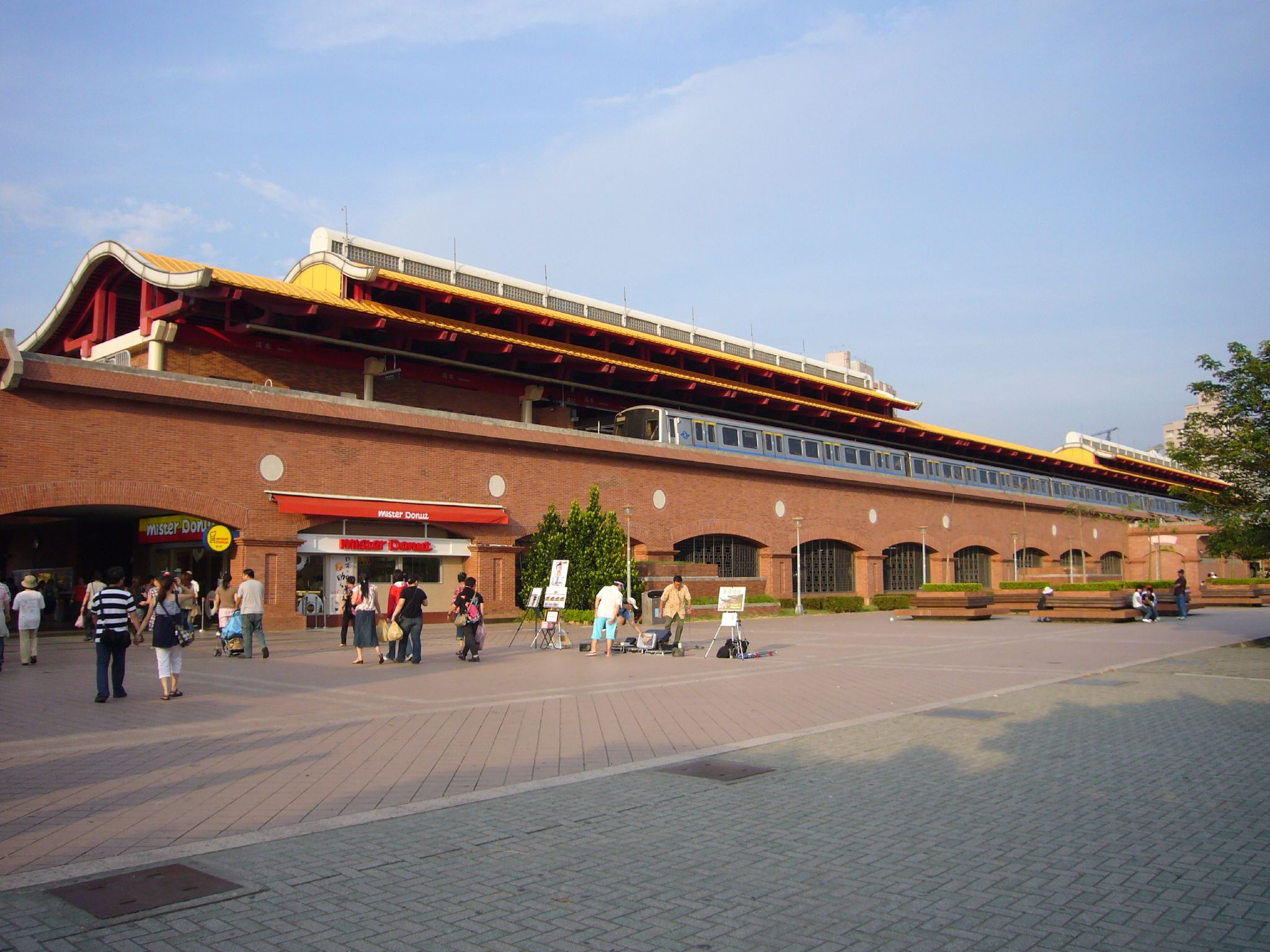
MRT Tamsui Station

=== Taipei Metro ===
- Tamsui Station
- Hongshulin Station
- Zhuwei Station

=== Light rail ===
- Danhai light rail

== Sister city ==
- (United States) Chico, U.S. – 1985
- Ōi, Japan – 2023

== Notable natives ==
- Joe Hung, representative to Italy (1993–2000)
- Tu Tsung-ming, former physician
- Patrick Brasca, Taiwanese Singer

== Gallery ==
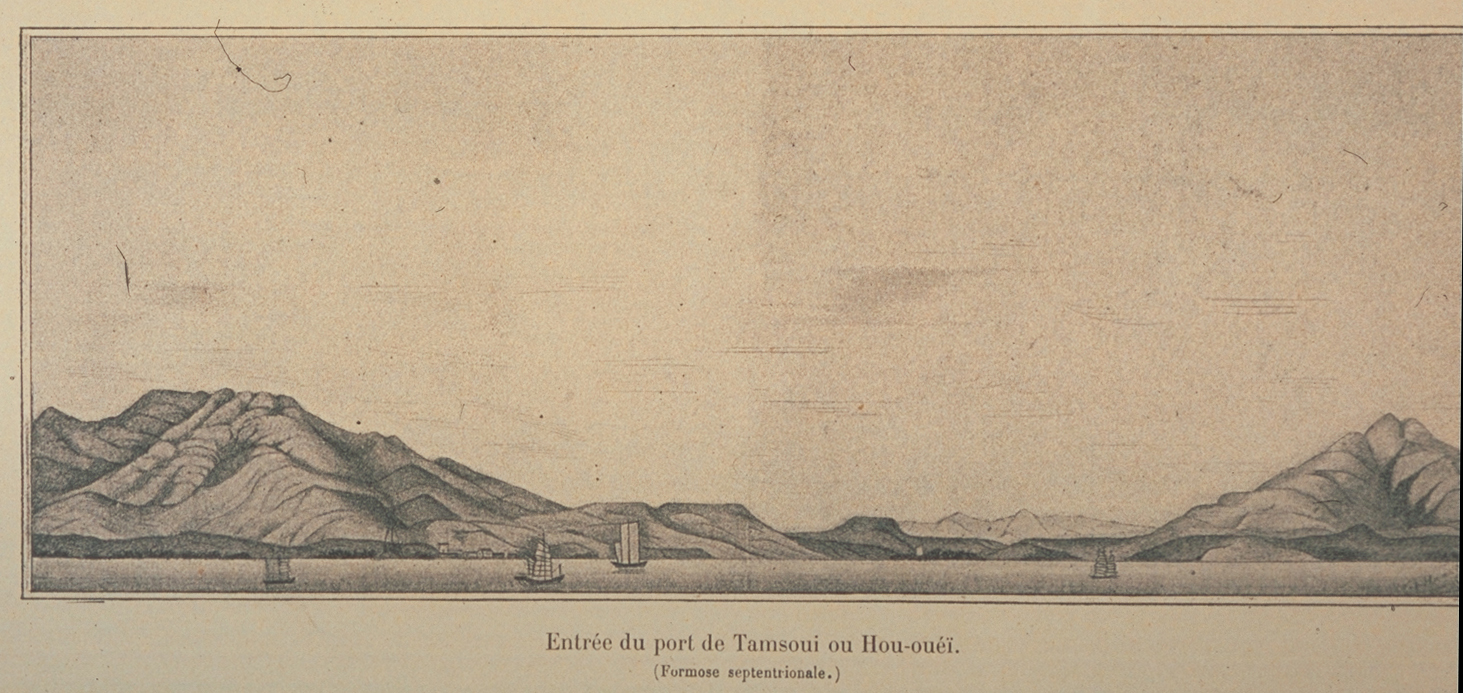
A French sketch of Tamsui in 1893

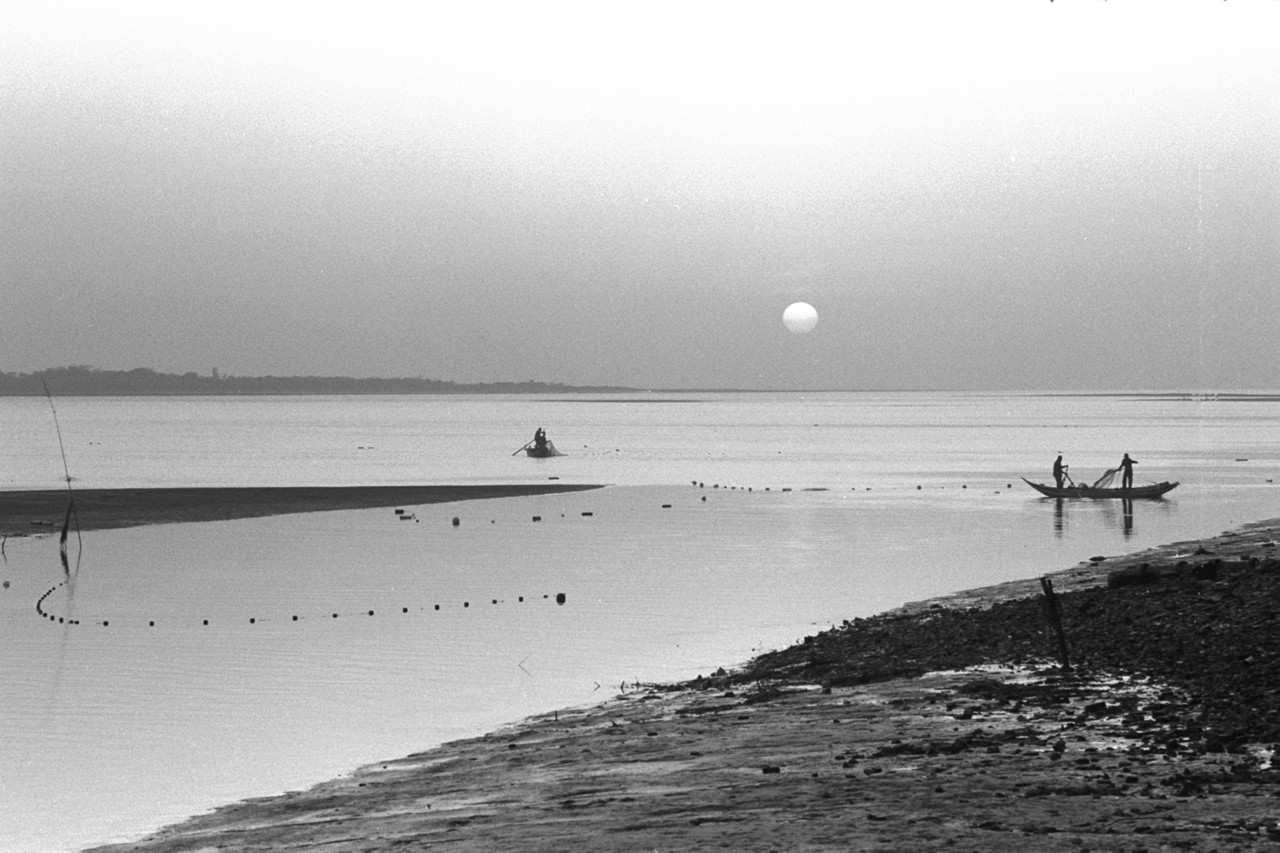
Tamsui Port, circa 1970

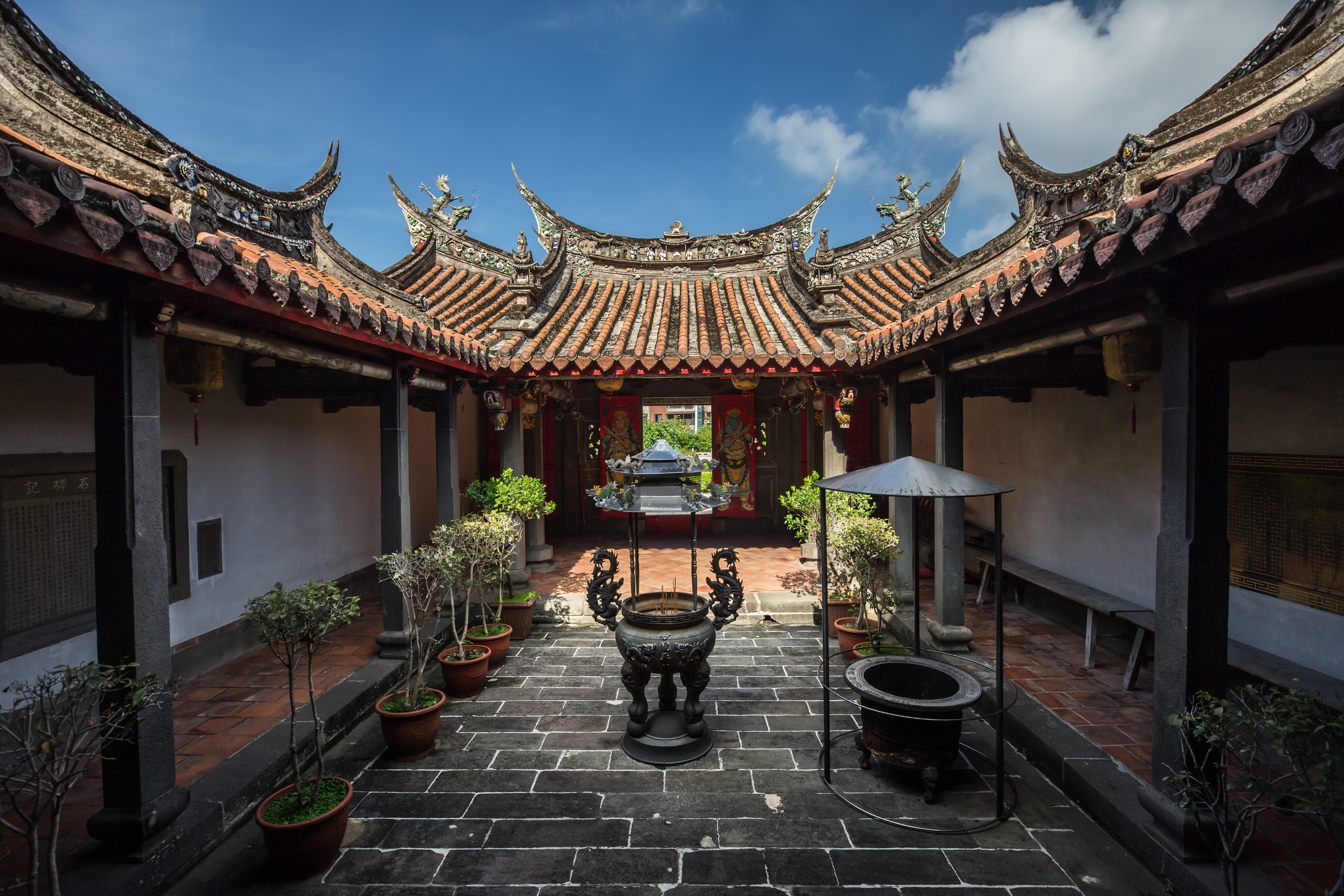
The Yinshan Temple in Tamsui, 2018

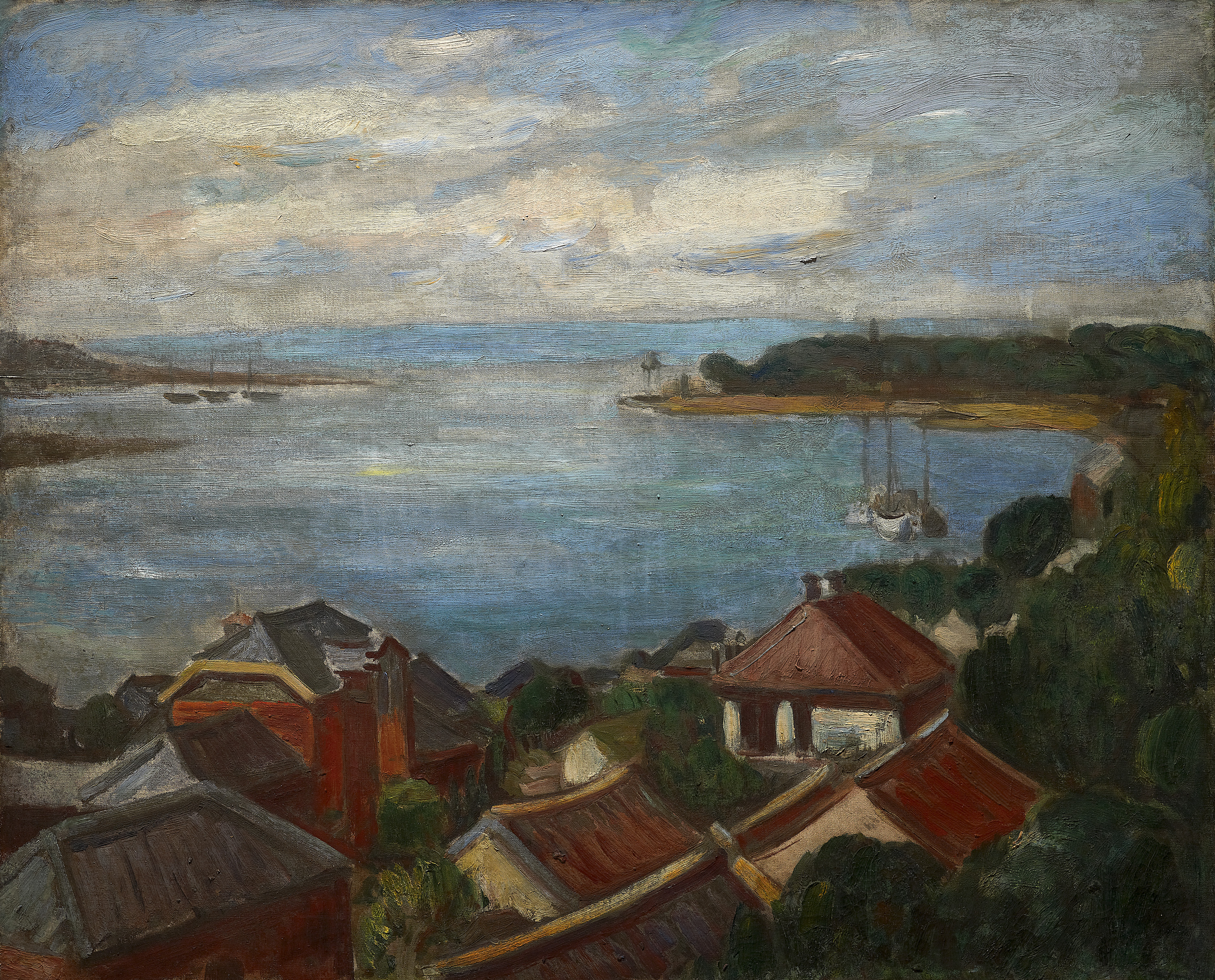
Tamsui Harbor (Li Mei-shu, 1930)

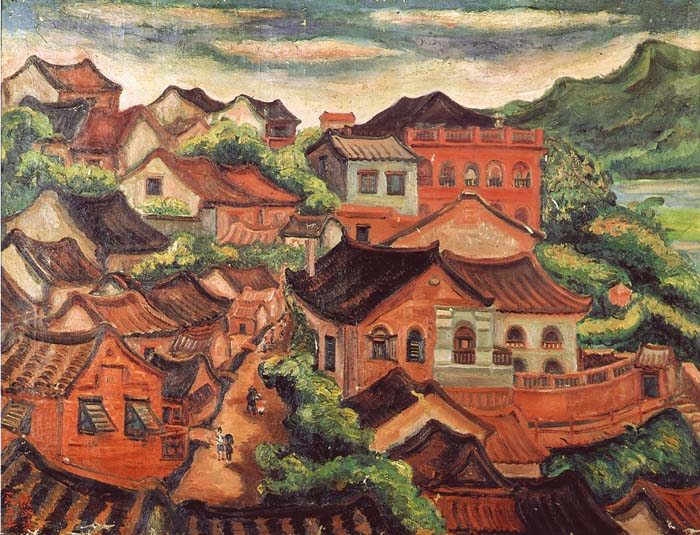
Tamsui (Tan Ting-pho, 1935) – 91 × 116.5 cm – Taiwan Museum of Fine Arts

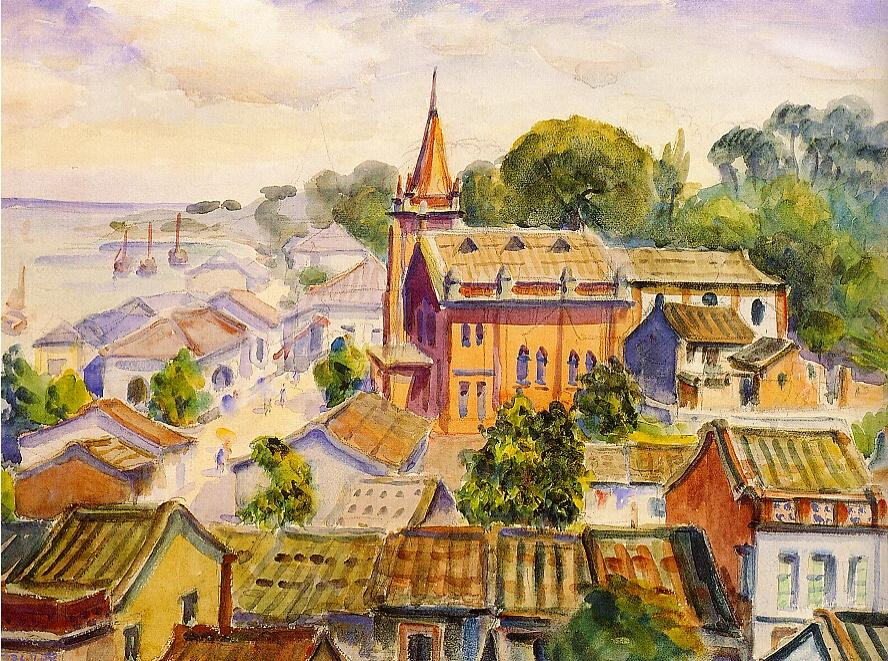
Tamsui Church (Ni Chiang-huai, 1936) – Paper, watercolor – 49.5 × 66 cm – Taipei Museum of Fine Arts

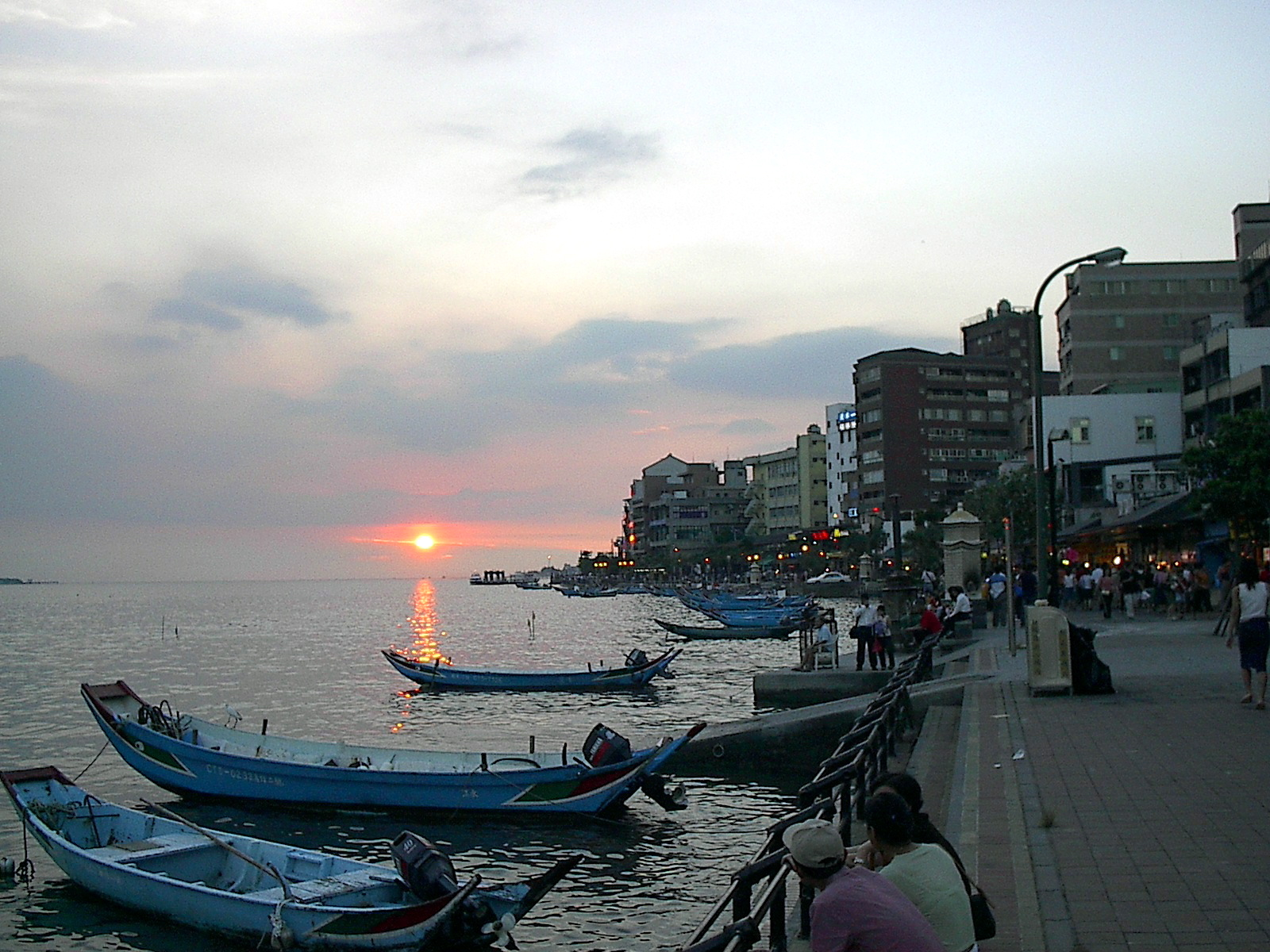
Tamsui waterfront at sunset

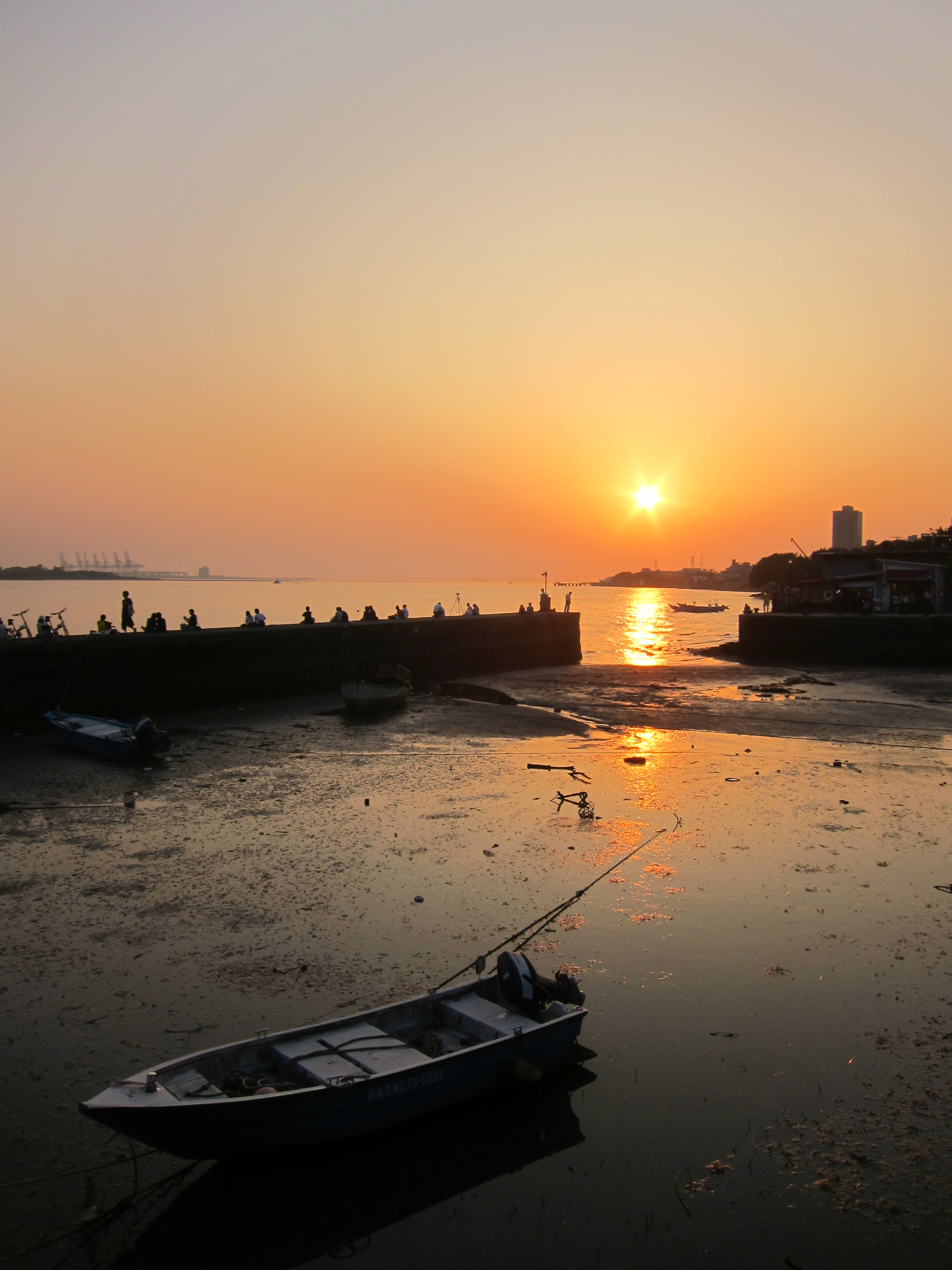
The sunset in front of the Long Pier of Tamsui

== Bibliography ==
- Davidson, James W. (1903). The Island of Formosa, Past and Present : history, people, resources, and commercial prospects : tea, camphor, sugar, gold, coal, sulphur, economical plants, and other productions. London and New York: Macmillan. OCLC 1887893. OL 6931635M.
- Takekoshi, Yosaburō (1907). Japanese rule in Formosa. London, New York, Bombay and Calcutta: Longmans, Green, and co. OCLC 753129. OL 6986981M.
