= Tamsui Old Street =

Street in Tamsui, New Taipei, Taiwan

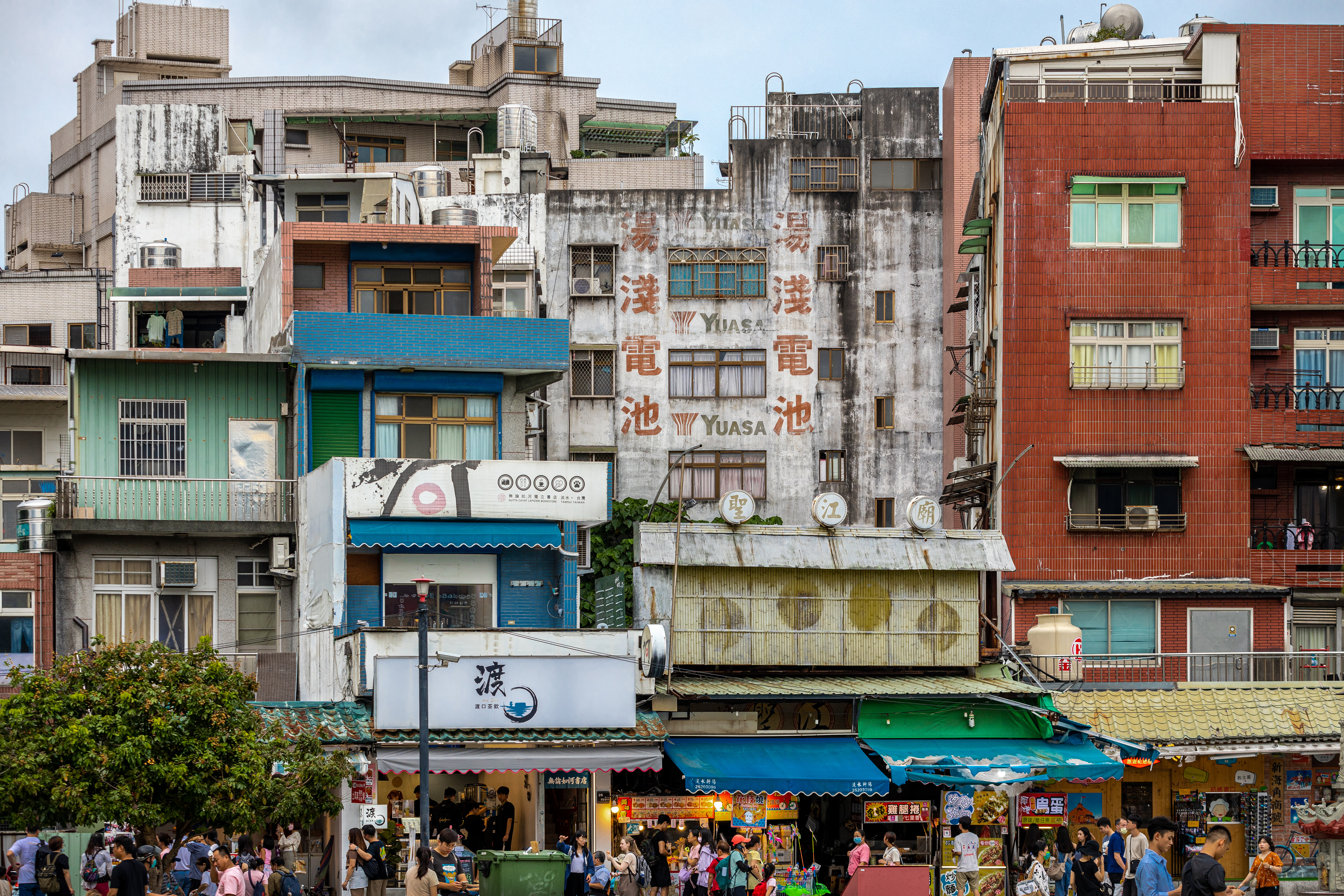
- Tamsui Old Street Buildings in 2023

- Location within Taiwan
- Native name: 淡水老街 (Chinese)
- Type: pedestrian zone
- Location: Tamsui, New Taipei, Taiwan
- Coordinates: 25°10′10.7″N 121°26′29.8″E

The Tamsui Old Street (Chinese: 淡水老街; pinyin: Dànshuǐ Lǎojiē) is a street in Tamsui District, New Taipei, Taiwan.

== Features ==
The street is lined with shops selling traditional pastries, A-gei, Iron Eggs, fish balls, fried fish crackers.

There are also prominent century-old Chinese temples like Fuyou Temple (淡水福佑宮) built in 1796 and Qingshui Temple (淡水清水巖) located in this area.

== Transportation ==
The street is accessible within walking distance north west from Tamsui Station of Taipei Metro.

== See also ==
- List of roads in Taiwan
- List of tourist attractions in Taiwan
