= O͘ =

Letter of the Latin alphabet

O͘ o͘

O͘, or o͘, is one of the six Hokkien vowels as written in the Pe̍h-ōe-jī (POJ) orthography. It is pronounced [ɔ], like the pronunciation of ⟨aw⟩ in "law". The orthography also uses diacritics to indicate tone, and the standard letter without a diacritic represents the vowel in the first or fourth tone (with the fourth tone used in syllables with a stop consonant, i.e. ⟨-p⟩, ⟨-t⟩, ⟨-k⟩, ⟨-h⟩ /-ʔ/, and the first tone used in other cases). The other possible tone categories require one of the following tonal symbols to be written above it:

- Ó͘ ó͘ (second tone) 《陰上／阴上》
- Ò͘ ò͘ (third tone) 《陰去／阴去》
- Ô͘ ô͘ (fifth tone) 《陽平／阳平》
- Ǒ͘ ǒ͘ (sixth tone, used in Quanzhou-descended dialects) 《陽上／阳上》
- Ō͘ ō͘ (seventh tone) 《陽去／阳去》
- O̍͘ o̍͘ (eighth tone) 《陽入／阳入》
- Ŏ͘ ŏ͘ / Ő͘ ő͘ (ninth tone, high rising in Taiwanese Hokkien)

== History ==
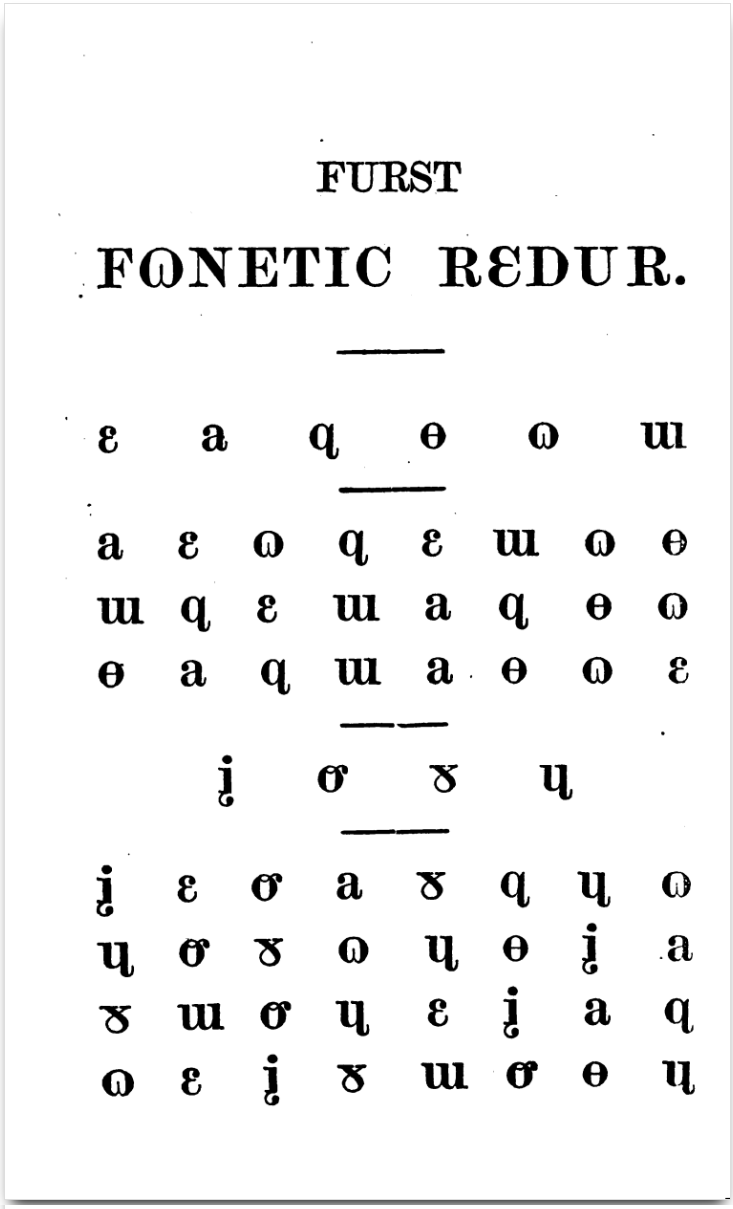
Carstairs Douglas's 1873 Chinese–English Dictionary of the Vernacular or Spoken Language of Amoy used a barred o with curl very similar to the one on the far left of the 4th row of letters from the top of this image to represent the /ɔ/ sound that Pe̍h-ōe-jī (POJ) usually represented with O͘ o͘

The character was introduced by the Xiamen-based missionary Elihu Doty in the mid-nineteenth century, as a way to distinguish the Hokkien vowels /o/ and /ɔ/ (the latter becoming ⟨o͘⟩). Since then it has become established in the Pe̍h-ōe-jī orthography, with only occasional deviations early in its usage – one example being Carstairs Douglas's 1873 Chinese–English Dictionary of the Vernacular or Spoken Language of Amoy, where he replaced the ⟨o͘ ⟩ with ⟨ө̛ ⟩ (an o with a curl, similar to that of the English Phonotypic Alphabet), and a second example being Tan Siew Imm's 2016 dictionary of Penang Hokkien, where she replaced the ⟨o͘ ⟩ with ⟨ɵ⟩.

== Computing ==
In the Unicode computer encoding, it is a normal Latin o followed by U+0358 ◌͘ COMBINING DOT ABOVE RIGHT, and is not to be confused with the Vietnamese Ơ. This letter is not well-supported by fonts and is often typed as either o· (using the interpunct), o• (using the bullet), o' (using the apostrophe), oo (as used in Tâi-lô for Taiwanese Hokkien and Wāpuro rōmaji for Japanese), or ou (as used in Wāpuro rōmaji for Japanese).
