= Barclay Memorial Park =

Cemetery in East, Tainan, Taiwan

- 巴克禮紀念公園
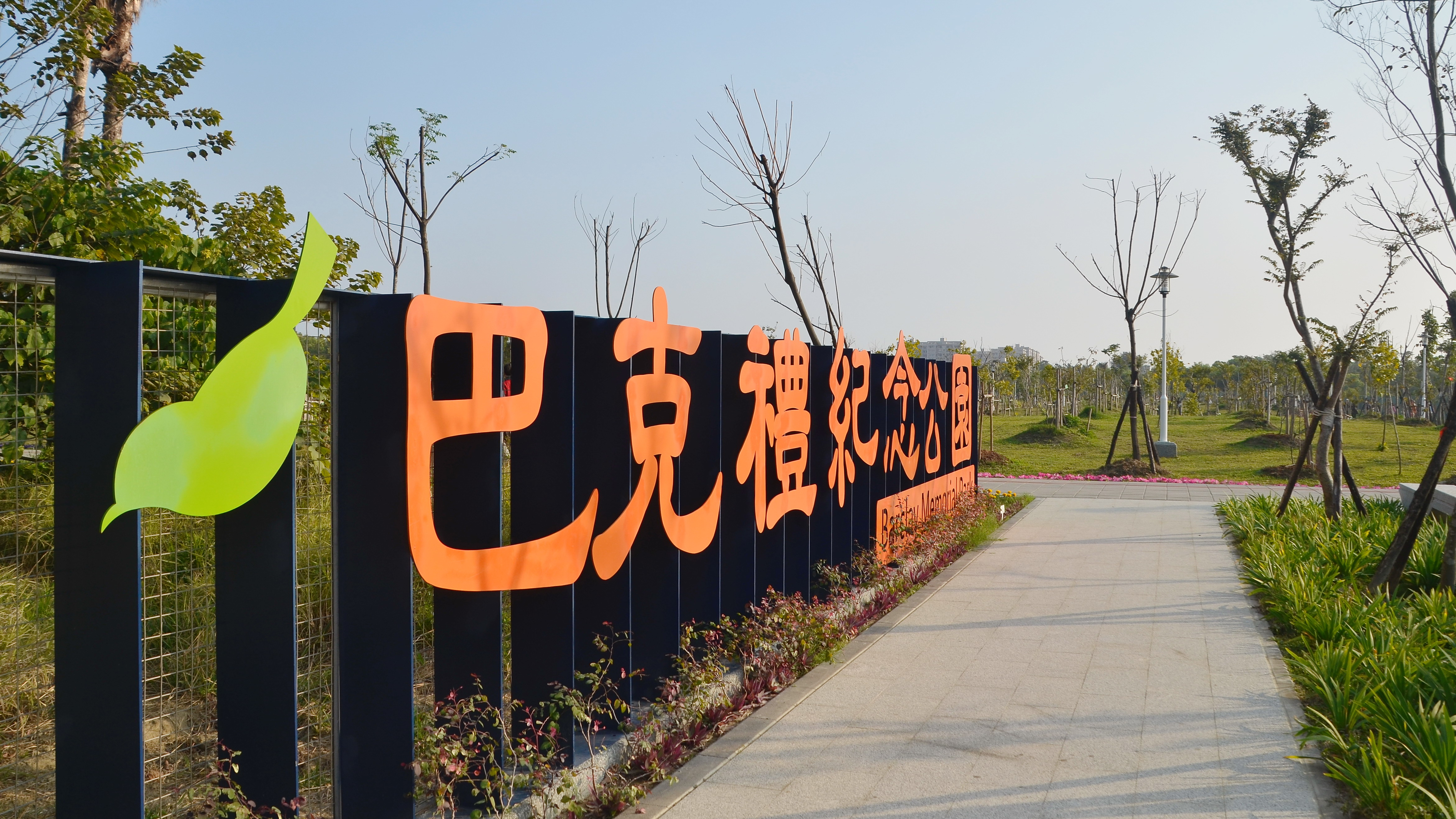
- Interactive map of Barclay Memorial Park

Details
- Established: 2003
- Location: East, Tainan, Taiwan
- Coordinates: 22°58′18″N 120°13′21″E
- Type: memorial park
- Size: 3 hectares

The Barclay Memorial Park (traditional Chinese: 巴克禮紀念公園; simplified Chinese: 巴克礼纪念公园; pinyin: Bākèlǐ Jìniàn Gōngyuán; Pe̍h-ōe-jī: Pa-khek-lé Kì-liām Kong-hn̂g) is a memorial park in Chongming Village, East District, Tainan, Taiwan.

== Name ==
The park was named after Thomas Barclay, a British missionary to Taiwan in 1875–1935.

== History ==
In 1993, the park area was actually designed to be Park No. 18 by Tainan City Government in which the city government should carry out the construction project within the same year. However, due to land ownership disputes between Tainan City and Tainan County, the land failed to be developed which caused the park to remain idle since then. After a decade without proper management, the park was flooded with wild plants and trashes, which eventually turned out to be a landfill.

In 2001, the chief of Chongming Village had an idea of rejuvenate the park area and turn it into a beautiful park. Thus soon afterwards, cleanup efforts was initiated by him and his friends, gradually expanded to 57 volunteers. Eventually, more and more people helped to rebuild the park. Vehicles coming in and out to dispose the rubbish. They built the slopes of the creek course, repaved the walking paths, trimmed the plants and repopulated the park with fireflies. The park was eventually fully established in 2003 and renamed Barclay Memorial Park.

== Geography ==
The memorial park covers an area of around 3 hectares.

== See also ==
- List of tourist attractions in Taiwan
