= Thomas Barclay (missionary) =

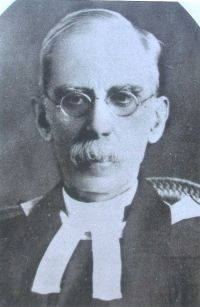
- Portrait of Barclay
- Born: 21 November 1849; Glasgow, Scotland, United Kingdom
- Died: 5 October 1935 (aged 85); Sin-Lau Hospital, Tainan City, Tainan Prefecture, Japanese Taiwan (modern-day Tainan, Taiwan)
- Education: University of Glasgow; University of Leipzig
- Title: M.A.

Thomas Barclay (Chinese: 巴克禮; Pe̍h-ōe-jī: Pa-khek-lé; 21 November 1849 – 5 October 1935) was a missionary of the Presbyterian Church of England to Formosa (now called Taiwan) from 1875 until his death. His ministry in southern Taiwan has been compared to the work done in northern Taiwan by George Leslie Mackay. He founded Tainan Theological College and Seminary in 1876.

== Early life ==
Thomas Barclay was born on 21 November 1849 in Glasgow, the youngest brother of six (he also had one sister). His father was a devout merchant who sold soft goods and fabrics, and claimed French Huguenot ancestry for the family. The younger Barclay was an able student, and matriculated at Glasgow University a few weeks before his 15th birthday (his young age not being unusual in those days). While there he excelled at mathematics and science, studying under Sir William Thomson (later Lord Kelvin) and earning a mention in the Encyclopædia Britannica for his authorship of a scientific treatise on "the Specific Inductive Capacity of Dielectrics". He was the first student to graduate in the new Gilmorehill hall of Glasgow University, after which he studied at the Free Church Divinity College with his friends John Campbell Gibson and Dugald Mackichan. On deciding to become missionaries the three became known as the "Glasgow Three" (in reference to the Cambridge Seven) and went to Leipzig for further study.

== From Scotland to the Far East ==
While at the Divinity College, Barclay had met Carstairs Douglas, brother of the principal of the college and missionary in Amoy (Xiamen). Douglas inspired Barclay and his friends to move east, with Mackichan heading to Bombay, Gibson to Swatow and Barclay to Formosa (Taiwan). He would later joke that he was chosen over Gibson for Formosa because of his longer legs, the better to navigate the hillier country in southern Taiwan. In 1885, after a year spent in Amoy learning the Amoy dialect under Douglas, Barclay moved to Taiwan-fu, the then capital of Qing-era Taiwan, where he was to spend the rest of his life in service to the church and the people of that city. He was the fifth missionary from the Presbyterian Church of England to be stationed in Taiwan-fu, after James Laidlaw Maxwell, Hugh Ritchie, William Campbell and Matthew Dickson. He was responsible for introducing the first newsletter in Taiwanese Hokkien, which was also the first printed newspaper in Taiwan in any language, the Taiwan Church News, printed using the Peh-oe-ji romanisation. Barclay married Elisabeth Turner, in England, in 1892.

== Written works ==
Barclay was also responsible for overseeing the translation of the Bible from English into Taiwanese, first the New Testament in 1916 and then the Old Testament in 1932. Both volumes are still in print today, and have a reputation for elegance and accuracy, although due to both the passage of time and the fact that the church dialect is rather removed from everyday speech, the prose can sound strange to modern ears.

His other major contribution to the study of the language was the Supplement to Dictionary of the vernacular or spoken language of Amoy, which accompanies Carstairs Douglas' Amoy-English dictionary, in essence "completing" the work, which up until then had lacked a character index to accompany the romanised entries.

== Averting disaster during the Japanese takeover ==
In 1895 the ailing Qing Dynasty ceded the island of Taiwan to Japan and relinquished all claim to it. In the resulting power vacuum before Japanese troops arrived to take over control, a fledgling resistance movement sprang up and a Republic of Formosa (loyal to the departed Qing) was declared. The Japanese treated any such resistance harshly and looked set to make an example of Tainan as the former capital. With forces from both sides arrayed to fight, Barclay emerged from the city to mediate with the Japanese, persuading the defenders to surrender and the invaders against taking punitive measures. Barclay's services in the capitulation of Tainan were recognised by the Japanese by the award of a medal from the emperor.

== Death and memorials ==
Barclay is buried alongside several other missionaries in the Presbyterian section of a public cemetery in the southern part of Tainan City. His congregation raised up a church in his honour - the Barclay Memorial Church, which still bears his name today. To honor his contributions to the city, in 2004, the Tainan City Government renamed the Park No.18 (十八號公園) the Barclay Memorial Park; the park itself won the FIABCI Prix d’Excellence Award in 2007.

== Gallery ==
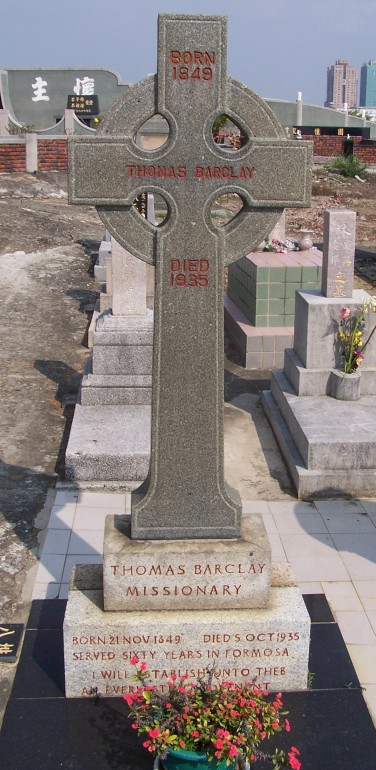
Thomas Barclay's grave in Tainan

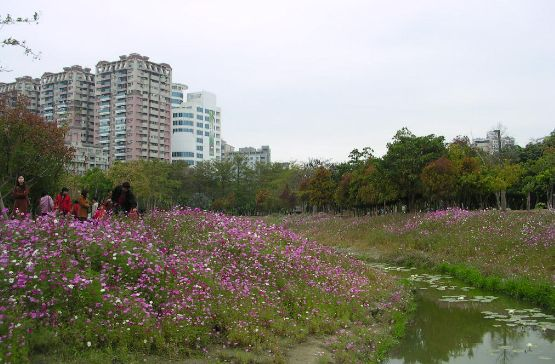
Barclay Memorial Park

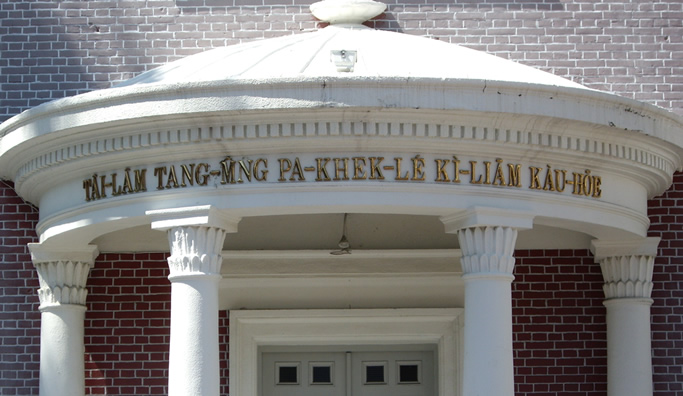
Lintel above the door of the Barclay Memorial Church

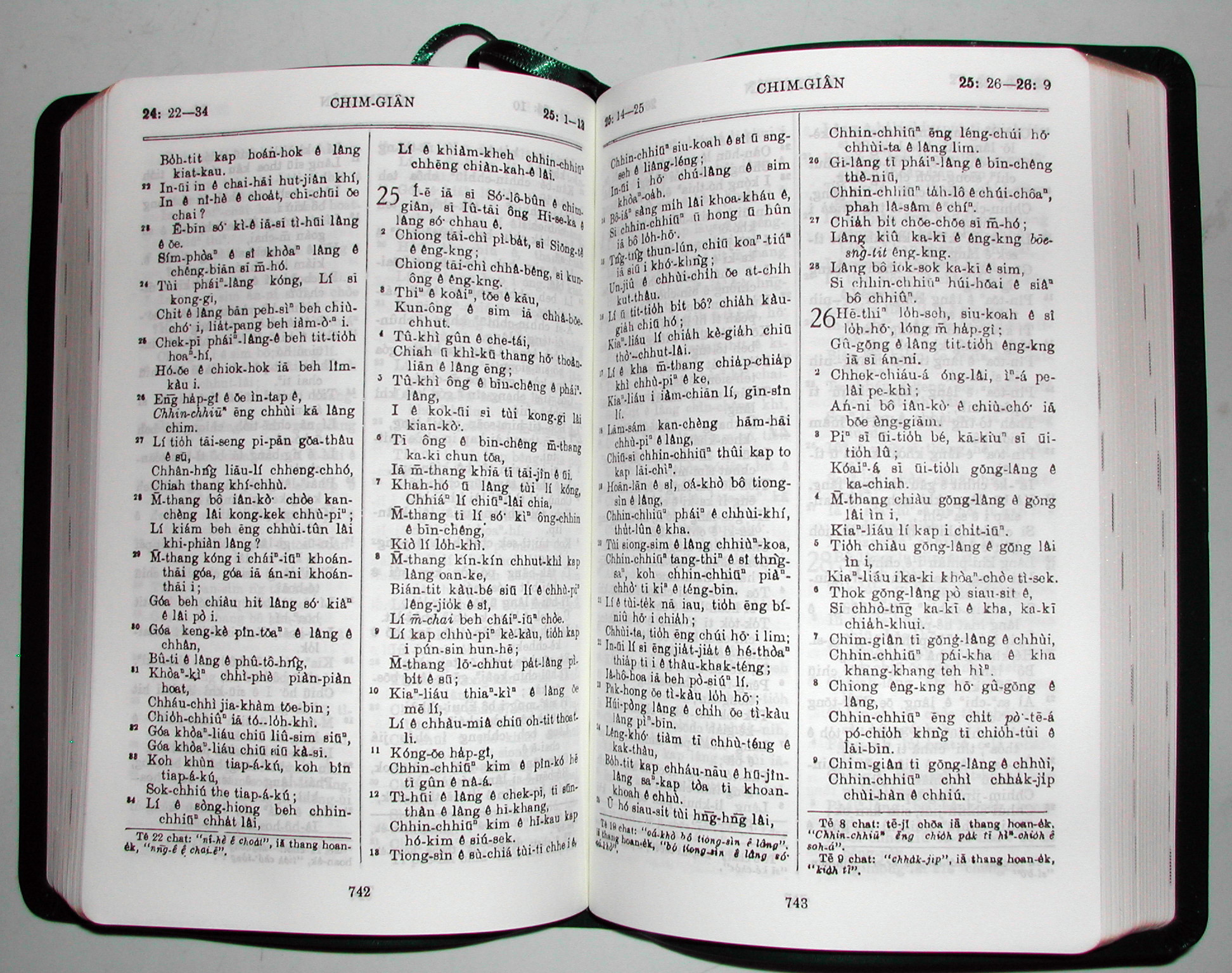
The Amoy Romanized Bible
