= Carstairs Douglas =

- Missionary and Linguist
- Born: 27 December 1830; Kilbarchan, Renfrewshire, Scotland
- Died: 26 July 1877 (aged 46); Xiamen, Fujian, China (Qing dynasty)
- Education: University of Glasgow; University of Edinburgh
- Title: LL.D.
- Parent(s): Rev. Robert Douglas; Janet Monteath

Carstairs Douglas (Chinese: 杜嘉德; Pe̍h-ōe-jī: Tō͘ Ka-tek; 27 December 1830 in Kilbarchan, Renfrewshire – 26 July 1877 in Xiamen, China) was a Scottish missionary and lexicographer, remembered chiefly for his writings concerning the Hokkien language of Southern Min in Southern Fujian, in particular his Chinese–English Dictionary of the Vernacular or Spoken Language of Amoy.

== Early life ==
Castairs Douglas was born a son of the manse in Kilbarchan in Renfrewshire, Scotland, the youngest or second-youngest of seven children. His father Rev Robert Douglas, was the parish minister, and his elder brother Robert was also closely involved in the church. His brother George also joined the church and served as Moderator of the General Assembly to the Free Church of Scotland 1894/95/

Douglas studied at the University of Glasgow from 1845 until 1851, gaining an MA degree, and was later awarded the LL.D. by his alma mater in recognition of his scholarly achievements. Going on to study Divinity at the University of Edinburgh, Douglas professed a keen interest in missionary work. He was ordained in February 1855 and set sail for China a month later.

== Mission to Amoy (Xiamen) ==
As one of the treaty ports opened to Westerners in 1842, Xiamen (then known in the West as Amoy) was one of the few places in China where missionaries could go about their work relatively unmolested. During his tenure Douglas was responsible for increasing the single church in Xiamen to a congregation of twenty-five churches, composed mostly of Chinese members. Contemporaries of Douglas were heavily involved in producing material concerned with the local language, including Elihu Doty who wrote the Anglo-Chinese Manual with Romanized Colloquial in the Amoy Dialect and John Van Nest Talmage, author of the Ê-Mn̂g Im ê Jī-tián (Dictionary of the Amoy Speech). While stationed in Xiamen, Douglas, alongside fellow Scottish medical missionary H. L. Mackenzie, visited Formosa (modern-day Taiwan) and was influential in the decision by the English Presbyterian Mission to send missionaries to the island. In his last significant position Douglas was elected joint Chairman of the Shanghai Missionary Conference of 1877, a gathering of 150 or so missionaries employed in the China field.

== Published works ==
=== Amoy–English Dictionary ===
During twenty-two years as a Presbyterian missionary in Xiamen, Douglas amassed a wealth of information on the Hokkien language under Southern Min spoken in the area, eventually compiling his Chinese–English Dictionary of the Vernacular or Spoken Language of Amoy (1873), which was one of the first comprehensive Hokkien–English dictionaries between Hokkien and English; it remains an important work in the understanding of the language where decades later many other later dictionaries and works became based on. The dictionary used an early version of the Peh-oe-ji romanisation to represent the sounds of Hokkien, with pronunciations particularly from Amoy/Xiamen and both Zhangzhou and Quanzhou, and other more specific dialects of Hokkien, along with the identification of literary and colloquial readings for many of the entries.

Douglas felt that in regards to his work...

...[t]he most serious defect is the want of the Chinese character. ... I cherish the hope of publishing a Key or Sequel in two or three years, giving the characters so far as they can be found.

Douglas' hope was ended by his early death, although fifty years after the initial publication of his dictionary just such an appendix was added, by the Reverend Thomas Barclay, a missionary stationed in Tainan, Qing-era Taiwan who had himself much benefited from the volume.

== Death and memorial ==
Douglas died of cholera on 26 July 1877 at the age of 46 in his adopted home of Xiamen and was buried on Gulangyu. He is memorialised in a stained-glass window in St. Bryce Kirk, Kirkcaldy which was dedicated by his brother Robert Douglas, an elder of the kirk.

== Family ==
Douglas's nephew (son of his brother Robert) was the eminent hygienist Prof Carstairs Cumming Douglas, named in his memory.

== Bibliography ==
- Douglas, Carstairs (1869). A Reply to the charges brought against Protestant Missions in China ... With a preface [by D. Matheson]. London.
- Band, Edward (1948). Working his purpose out : the history of the English Presbyterian Mission, 1847-1947. Presbyterian Church of England. OCLC 7700717.
- Douglas, Carstairs (1873). Chinese–English dictionary of the vernacular or spoken language of Amoy (1st ed.). London: Trübner. hdl:2027/mdp.39015083430507. OCLC 4820970.
- Douglas, Carstairs (1899) [1873]. Chinese-English dictionary of the vernacular or spoken language of Amoy (2nd ed.). London: Presbyterian Church of England. OCLC 5516636. OL 25126855M.
- Douglas, Carstairs; Barclay, Thomas (1990) [1923]. Chinese–English Dictionary of the Vernacular or Spoken Language of Amoy. Taipei: SMC Publishing. ISBN 9579482322. OCLC 670105622.
- Douglas, John M. (1878). Memorials of Rev. Carstairs Douglas. Amoy Mission to China. LCCN 21006465. OCLC 40746248. OL 24150785M.
- Scott, Hew (1920). Fasti ecclesiae scoticanae; the succession of ministers in the Church of Scotland from the reformation. Vol. 3. Edinburgh: Oliver and Boyd. pp. 150-151.
