= Lāi-goā-kho Khàn-hō͘-ha̍k =

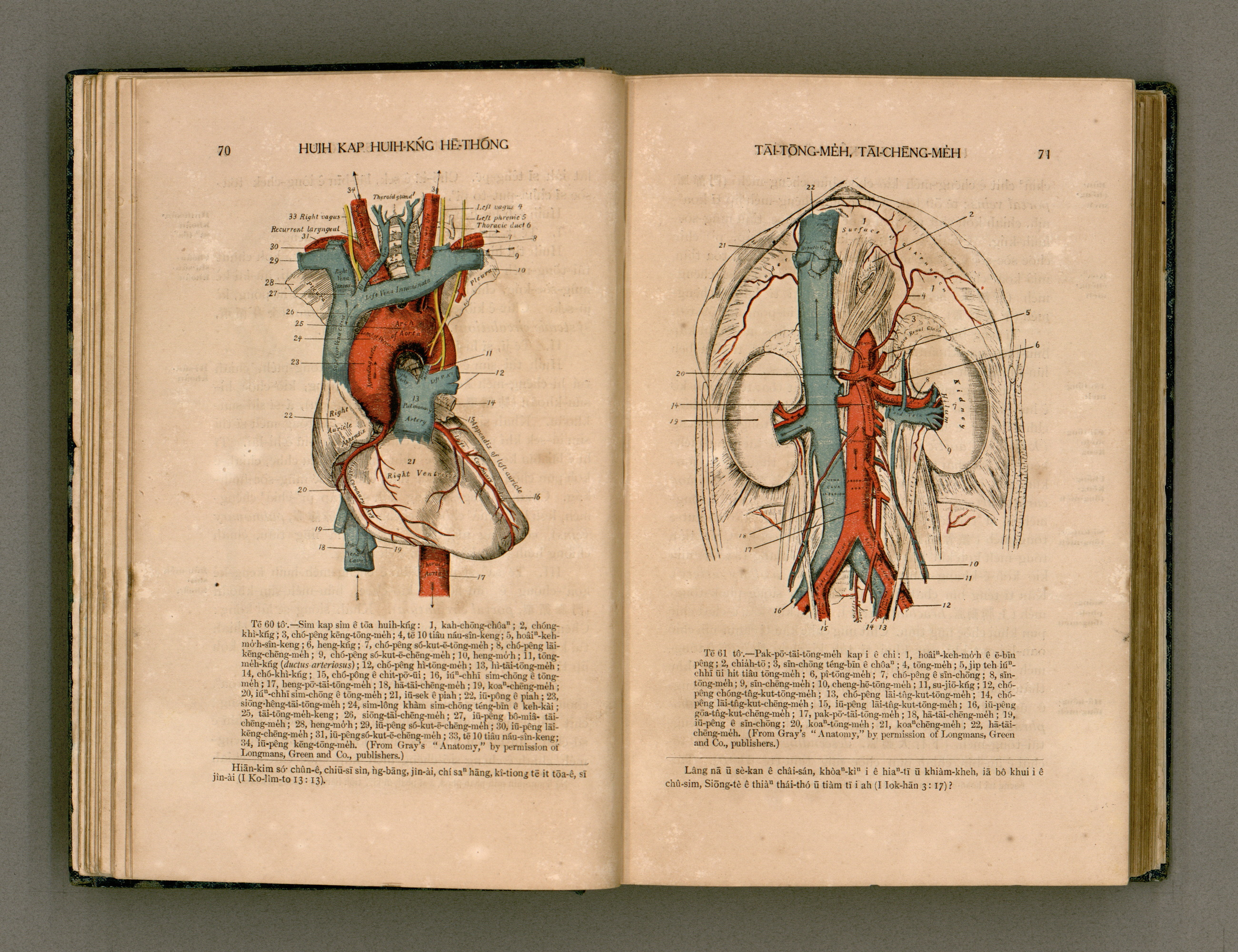
1917 The Principles and Practice of Nursing in Pe̍h-ōe-jī

Lāi-goā-kho Khàn-hō͘-ha̍k (English: The Principles and Practice of Nursing; Chinese: 內外科看護學) is a Taiwanese language human nursing textbook. The book was compiled by Canadian M.D. George Gushue-Taylor and his Taiwanese assistant Tân Toā-lô (陳大鑼). It was first printed at Yokohama, Japan on October 5, 1917, then published at Tainan Chō, Japanese Formosa on Oct. 8, same year. Moreover, it is widely regarded as a first work on the subject in Taiwanese.

== Contents and themes ==
This book is written in the Pe̍h-ōe-jī orthography and includes 40 chapters, 675 pages and 503 figures. Generally, it is a medical textbook that contains a fully comprehensive account of the anatomical, physiological, and human body’s knowledge available at the time of publication.

Given the motif of the book in the first chapter, it is shown as follows.

Tē 1 Chiuⁿ “Seng-khu Phó͘-thong ê Kò͘-chō”

Kái-phò-ha̍k (anatomy), chiū-sī kho-ha̍k (science) ê chi̍t hāng, i ê bo̍k-tek sī beh káng-kiù seng-khu ê kò͘-chō (structure)

— Gushue-Taylor & Tân,

This translates to: (Chapter 1: ″The structure of human body″: Anatomy, as is a part of science, and its object is studying the structure of human body…)

This book served as a link between past and future in Taiwan medical history and promoted the development of earlier Taiwan medicine localization.

== See also ==
- Tn̂g-oē Hoan-jī Chho͘-ha̍k, by John Van Nest Talmage (1852)
- Cha̍p-hāng Kóan-kiàn, by Chhoa Poe-hoe (1925)
