= Azubah Caroline Condit =

Reformed Church in America missionary (d. 1844)

Azubah Caroline Condit (c. 1810 – June 11, 1844) was a missionary of the Reformed Church in America.

Condit embarked on missionary work in response to a call from David Abeel, and with Jacob Ennis, Elihu Doty, Elbert Nevius, and William Youngblood, along with their wives, she sailed to Borneo from New York City in June 1836; she was the sister of Elbert Nevius' wife. The first single woman to engage in foreign mission work for the Reformed Church in America, her title was "assistant missionary". She studied Chinese and engaged in the instruction of Chinese girls on Java; she also founded a boarding school at Pontianak dedicated to the education of Chinese girls. In Mumbai, Condit married a fellow missionary, the Reverend D. O. Allen, on December 12, 1843; she died the following year in the same city.
