= Taiwan Church News =

Publication of the Presbyterian Church in Taiwan

- Front cover from April 2009
- Frequency: Weekly
- Publisher: Taiwan Church Press
- First issue: 1885
- Country: Taiwan
- Based in: Tainan
- Language: Mandarin Chinese, some sections in Taiwanese
- Website: https://tcnn.org.tw/

The Taiwan Church News (Chinese: 台灣教會公報; pinyin: Táiwān Jiàohuì Gōngbào; Pe̍h-ōe-jī: Tâi-oân Kàu-hōe Kong-pò) is a publication of the Presbyterian Church in Taiwan. It was first published in 1885 as the Tâi-oân-hú-siâⁿ Kàu-hōe-pò (臺灣府城教會報; Táiwān Fǔchéng Jiàohuì Bào; 'Taiwan Prefecture City Church News') under the direction of missionary Thomas Barclay, a British pastor of the Presbyterian Church, and was Taiwan's first printed newspaper, making it the longest-running newspaper in Taiwanese history. This early edition was also notable for being printed in romanised Taiwanese using the Pe̍h-ōe-jī orthography. The publication was banned during the latter stages of Japanese rule and editions were also impounded on several occasions during the martial law era in post-war Taiwan for discussing forbidden subjects. The newspaper is known for its use of Pe̍h-ōe-jī.

Contributing significantly to historical documentation in Taiwan, The Taiwan Church News contains extensive records of early local church history, current international events, and general knowledge. Its diverse content serves as an encyclopedia spanning the history of Taiwan, featuring declarations on human rights that document the recent history of democratic political development in Taiwan.

== Early years ==
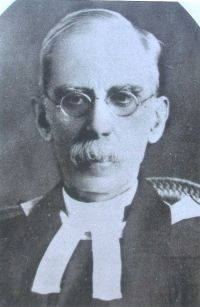
Founder Thomas Barclay

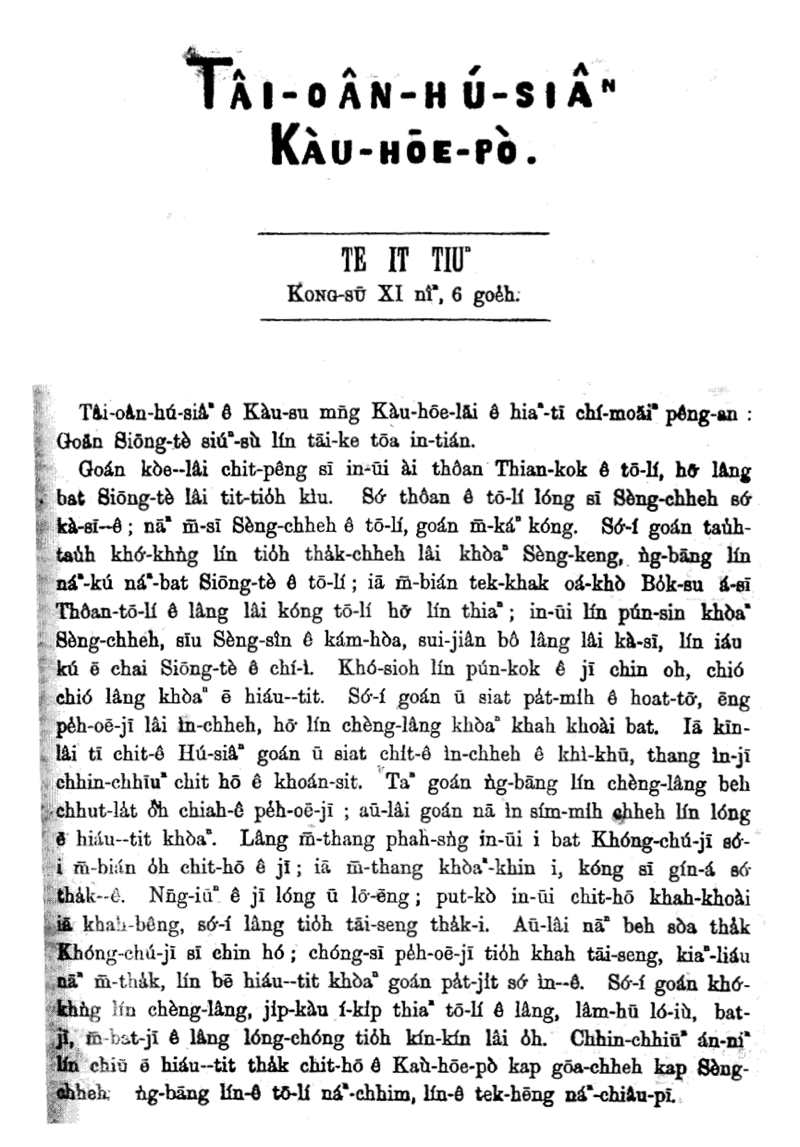
The front page of the first edition from July 12, 1885

In Taiwan in the late 1800s (during Taiwan's Qing era), few could read and write as few had access to the education necessary. Christian missionaries in southern Taiwan, eager that their converts learn to read and write, decided that Roman phonetic script (i.e. Pe̍h-ōe-jī) would be easier to learn and print than Chinese characters. James Laidlaw Maxwell, a medical missionary, donated a small printing press to the church in 1880, but at the time nobody in Taiwan-fu (modern-day Tainan) knew how to operate it.

In 1881 while on furlough in Glasgow, Thomas Barclay studied printing techniques; on his return to Taiwan-fu he sent others for printing training and set up a machine shop, which started printing in 1884. Then in June 1885 came the first issue of the Tâi-oân-hú-siâⁿ Kàu-hōe-pò (Taiwan-fu Church News), which thus became the first printed newspaper in the island.

The newspaper was just one of the products of the new press, and William Campbell was later able to proudly write that "our Tainan Mission Press turned out 700,357 pages, chiefly in the dialect or brogue of South Formosa during 1913". In 1915 the newspaper was reported as having a circulation of roughly 1,600.

== List of name changes ==
Name	POJ	Time
臺灣府城教會報	Tâi-oân-hú-siâⁿ Kàu-hōe-pò	12 July 1885—December 1891
臺南府教會報	Tâi-lâm-hú Kàu-hōe-pò	1892
臺南府城教會報	Tâi-lâm Hú-siâⁿ Kàu-hōe-pò	January 1893—December 1905
臺南教會報	Tâi-lâm Kàu-hōe-pò	1906—July 1913
臺灣教會報	Tâi-oân Kàu-hōe-pò	July 1913—April 1932
臺灣教會公報	Tâi-oân Kàu-hōe Kong-pò	May 1932—March 1942
臺灣教會公報	Tâi-oân Kàu-hōe Kong-pò	December 1945—March 1969
臺灣教會公報	Tâi-oân Kàu-hōe Kong-pò	December 1969—present

== World War II to the present ==
The newspaper experienced two periods of suspension: first, during the Sino-Japanese War when the Japanese authorities ordered its cessation (1942–1945), and second, due to the Nationalist government's ban on Taiwanese Hokkien (April–November 1969). It resumed publication in December of the same year with content in Mandarin, and its publication continues to the present day.

In 1895 Taiwan became a colony of Japan. In 1942 the Imperial Japanese government, now at war with the Allied countries including China, Britain, Australia, New Zealand, the United States and Canada, expelled missionaries from Taiwan. The press was closed. In 1945, after the Kuomintang (Chinese Nationalists) assumed one-party rule over Taiwan, the Taiwan Church News resumed publication.

In 1969 the printing of the Taiwan Church News in Pe̍h-ōe-jī was banned by the Kuomintang government as part of an effort to discourage use of local languages. The publication thereafter employed Mandarin Chinese characters. Even after the restrictions were lifted in the 1980s, Mandarin continued to be the dominant language, with "native languages" (Taiwanese Hokkien, Hakka and Formosan languages) confined to a "Mother Tongue Section" from 1991 onwards.

On several occasions under one-party Kuomintang rule the magazine was confiscated by authorities for running articles on forbidden topics. A discussion of the February 28 Incident saw the entire print run of 6,700 copies seized in 1987. The publication proved to be in the vanguard, however. When Lee Tung-hui became Taiwan's president the following year, setting society on a path toward modern democracy, 2–28 became a matter of open public discussion.

The modern incarnation of the periodical takes the form of a weekly magazine, plus ad hoc English reports on the organization's website.
