= Pe̍h-ōe-jī =

Romanization system of Southern Min Chinese languages

Pe̍h-ōe-jī Church Romanization
- A sample of Pe̍h-ōe-jī text
- Script type: Alphabet
- Creator: Walter Henry Medhurst; Elihu Doty; John Van Nest Talmage
- Period: since the 1830s
- Languages: Southern Min

Related scripts
- Parent systems: Egyptian hieroglyphs: Proto-Sinaitic; Phoenician alphabet; Greek alphabet; Latin script; Pe̍h-ōe-jī
- Child systems: TLPA; Tâi-lô

ISO 15924
- ISO 15924: BCP 47 variant subtag: pehoeji

Pe̍h-ōe-jī (/peɪweɪˈdʒiː/ pay-way-JEE; Taiwanese Hokkien: 白話字, pronounced [pe˩ˀ o̯e̞˩ d͡ʑi˧], lit. 'vernacular writing'; POJ), also known as Church Romanization, is an orthography used to write variants of Hokkien Southern Min, particularly Taiwanese and Amoy Hokkien. It is widely employed as one of the writing systems for Southern Min. During its peak, it had hundreds of thousands of readers.

Developed by Western missionaries working among the Chinese diaspora in Southeast Asia in the 19th century and refined by missionaries working in Xiamen and Tainan, it uses a modified Latin script and some diacritics to represent the spoken language. After initial success in Fujian, POJ became most widespread in Taiwan and, in the mid-20th century, there were over 100,000 people literate in POJ. A large amount of printed material, religious and secular, has been produced in the script, including Taiwan's first newspaper, the Taiwan Church News.

During Japanese rule (1895–1945), the use of Pe̍h-ōe-jī was suppressed and Taiwanese kana encouraged; it faced further suppression during the martial law period (1947–1987). In Fujian, use declined after the establishment of the People's Republic of China (1949) and by the early 21st century the system was not in general use there. However, Taiwanese Christians, non-native learners of Southern Min, and native-speaker enthusiasts in Taiwan are among those that continue to use Pe̍h-ōe-jī. Full computer support was achieved in 2004 with the release of Unicode 4.1.0, and POJ is now implemented in many fonts, input methods, and is used in extensive online dictionaries.

Versions of Pe̍h-ōe-jī have been devised for other Southern Chinese varieties, including Hakka and Teochew Southern Min. Other related scripts include Pha̍k-fa-sṳ for Hakka, Bǽh-oe-tu for Hainanese, Bàng-uâ-cê for Fuzhou, Pe̍h-ūe-jī for Teochew, Gṳ̿ing-nǎing Lô̤-mǎ-cī for Northern Min, and Hing-hua̍ báⁿ-uā-ci̍ for Pu-Xian Min.

POJ laid the foundation for the creation of new literature in Taiwan. Before the 1920s, many people had already written literary works in POJ, contributing significantly to the preservation of Southern Min vocabulary since the late 19th century. In 2006, the Taiwanese Romanization System (Tâi-lô), a government-sponsored successor based on Pe̍h-ōe-jī, was released. Despite this, native language education, and writing systems for Taiwanese, have remained a fiercely debated topic in Taiwan.

== Name ==
Pe̍h-ōe-jī
- Traditional Chinese: 白話字
- Simplified Chinese: 白话字
- Hokkien POJ: Pe̍h-ōe-jī, Pe̍h-ōe-lī, Pe̍͘h-ōa-jī
- Literal meaning: Vernacular writing
Transcriptions
Standard Mandarin
- Hanyu Pinyin: Báihuàzì
- Bopomofo: ㄅㄞˊ ㄏㄨㄚˋ ㄗˋ
- Wade–Giles: Pai^{2}-hua^{4}-tzu^{4}
- Tongyong Pinyin: Bái-huà-zìh
- IPA: [pǎɪ.xwâ.tsɹ̩̂]
Wu
- Romanization: Poe^{平} ho^{入} zî^{平}
Gan
- Romanization: Pha̍k-oa-chhi
Hakka
- Romanization: Pha̍k-fa-sṳ
Yue: Cantonese
- Yale Romanization: baahk wá jih
- Jyutping: baak6 waa2 zi6
- IPA: [pak̚˨ wa˧˥ tsi˨]
Southern Min
- Hokkien POJ: Pe̍h-ōe-jī, Pe̍h-ōe-lī, Pe̍͘h-ōa-jī
- Tâi-lô: Pe̍h-uē-jī
- Bbánlám Pìngyīm: Béhwêzzî
- Teochew Peng'im: Bêh^{8} uê^{7} ri^{7}
- Hainanese Romanization: Bǽh-oe-tu
Eastern Min
- Fuzhou BUC: Bàh-uâ-cê

The name Pe̍h-ōe-jī (Chinese: 白話字; pinyin: Báihuà zì) means "vernacular writing", written characters representing everyday spoken language. The name vernacular writing could be applied to many kinds of writing, romanized and character-based, but the term Pe̍h-ōe-jī is commonly restricted to the Southern Min romanization system developed by Presbyterian missionaries in the 19th century.

The missionaries who invented and refined the system used, instead of the name Pe̍h-ōe-jī, various other terms, such as "Romanized Amoy Vernacular" and "Romanized Amoy Colloquial." The origins of the system and its extensive use in the Christian community have led to it being known by some modern writers as "Church Romanization" (教會羅馬字; Kàu-hōe Lô-má-jī; Jiàohuì Luōmǎzì) and is often abbreviated in POJ itself to Kàu-lô. (教羅; Jiàoluō) There is some debate on whether "Pe̍h-ōe-jī" or "Church Romanization" is the more appropriate name.

Objections to the name Pe̍h-ōe-jī are that it can refer to more than one system and that both literary and colloquial register Southern Min appear in the system and so describing it as "vernacular" writing might be inaccurate. Objections to "Church Romanization" are that some non-Christians and some secular writing use it. POJ today is largely disassociated from its former religious purpose. The term "romanization" is also disliked by some, who see it as belittling the status of Pe̍h-ōe-jī by identifying it as a supplementary phonetic system instead of a standalone orthography.

== History ==
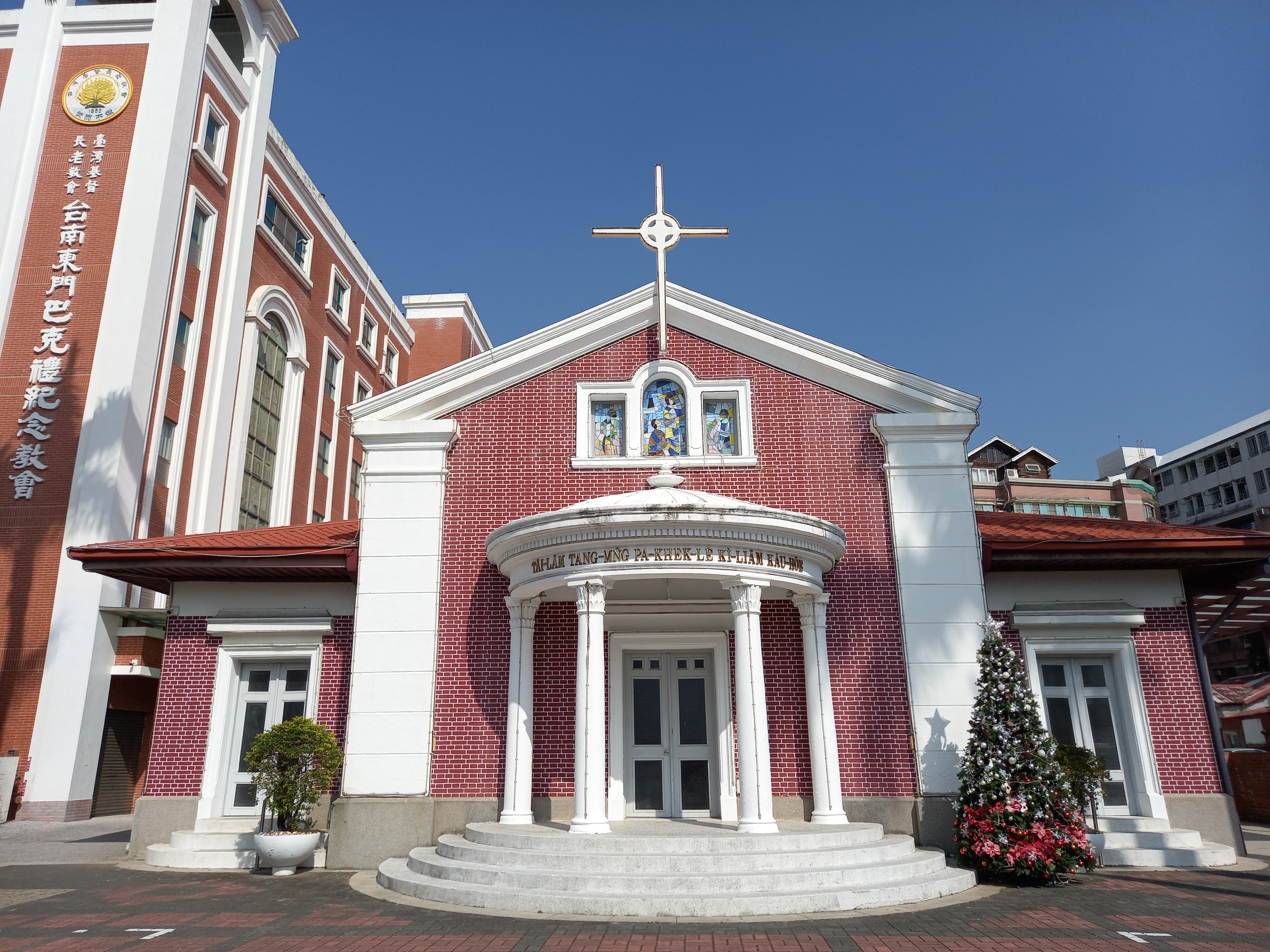
Pe̍h-ōe-jī inscription at a church in Tainan (Tâi-lâm), commemorating Thomas Barclay

The history of Pe̍h-ōe-jī has been heavily influenced by official attitudes towards the Southern Min vernaculars and the Christian organizations that propagated it. Early documents point to the purpose of the creation of POJ as being pedagogical in nature, closely allied to educating Christian converts.

=== Early development ===
The first people to use a romanized script to write Southern Min were Spanish missionaries in Manila in the 16th century. However, it was used mainly as a teaching aid for Spanish learners of Southern Min, and seems not to have had any influence on the development of Pe̍h-ōe-jī. In the early 19th century, China was closed to Christian missionaries, who instead proselytized to overseas Chinese communities in South East Asia. The earliest origins of the system are found in a small vocabulary first printed in 1820 by Walter Henry Medhurst, who went on to publish the Dictionary of the Hok-këèn Dialect of the Chinese Language, According to the Reading and Colloquial Idioms in 1832.

This dictionary represents the first major reference work in POJ, although the romanization within was quite different from the modern system, and has been dubbed Early Church Romanization by one scholar of the subject. Medhurst, who was stationed in Malacca, was influenced by Robert Morrison's romanization of Mandarin Chinese, but had to innovate in several areas to reflect major differences between Mandarin and Southern Min. Several important developments occurred in Medhurst's work, especially the application of consistent tone markings (influenced by contemporary linguistic studies of Sanskrit, which was becoming of more mainstream interest to Western scholars). Medhurst was convinced that accurate representation and reproduction of the tonal structure of Southern Min was vital to comprehension:

Respecting these tones of the Chinese language, some difference of opinion has been obtained, and while some have considered them of first importance, others have paid them little or no intention. The author inclines decidedly to the former opinion; having found, from uniform experience, that without strict attention to tones, it is impossible for a person to make himself understood in Hok-këèn.

— W. H. Medhurst

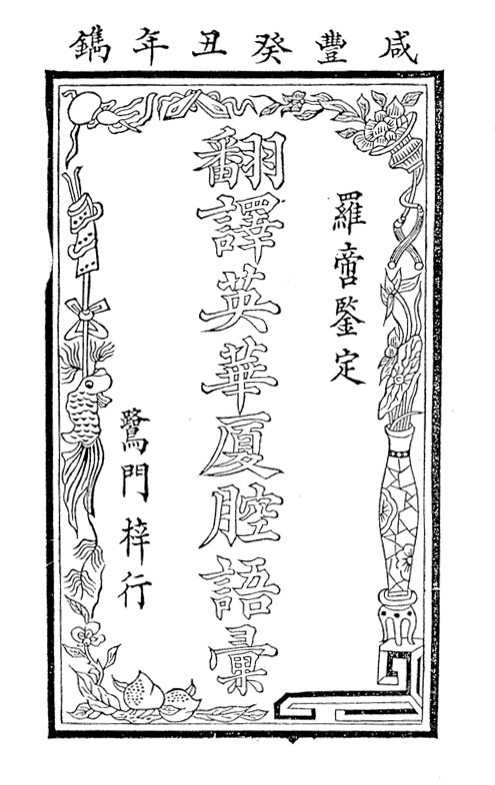
Frontispiece of Doty's Anglo Chinese Manual of the Amoy Dialect (1853)

The system expounded by Medhurst influenced later dictionary compilers with regard to tonal notation and initials, but both his complicated vowel system and his emphasis on the literary register of Southern Min were dropped by later writers. Following on from Medhurst's work, Samuel Wells Williams became the chief proponent of major changes in the orthography devised by Morrison and adapted by Medhurst. Through personal communication and letters and articles printed in The Chinese Repository a consensus was arrived at for the new version of POJ, although Williams' suggestions were largely not followed.

The first major work to represent this new orthography was Elihu Doty's Anglo-Chinese Manual with Romanized Colloquial in the Amoy Dialect, published in 1853. The manual can therefore be regarded as the first presentation of a pre-modern POJ, a significant step onwards from Medhurst's orthography and different from today's system in only a few details. From this point on various authors adjusted some of the consonants and vowels, but the system of tone marks from Doty's Manual survives intact in modern POJ. John Van Nest Talmage has traditionally been regarded as the founder of POJ among the community which uses the orthography, although it now seems that he was an early promoter of the system, rather than its inventor.

In 1842 the Treaty of Nanking was concluded, which included among its provisions the creation of treaty ports in which Christian missionaries would be free to preach. Xiamen (then known as Amoy) was one of these treaty ports, and British, Canadian and American missionaries moved in to start preaching to the local inhabitants. These missionaries, housed in the cantonment of Gulangyu, created reference works and religious tracts, including a bible translation. Naturally, they based the pronunciation of their romanization on the speech of Xiamen, which became the de facto standard when they eventually moved into other areas of the Hokkien Sprachraum, most notably Taiwan. The 1858 Treaty of Tianjin officially opened Taiwan to western missionaries, and missionary societies were quick to send men to work in the field, usually after a sojourn in Xiamen to acquire the rudiments of the language.

=== Maturity ===
Khó-sioh lín pún-kok ê jī chin oh, chió chió lâng khòaⁿ ē hiáu-tit. Só͘-í góan ū siat pa̍t-mih ê hoat-tō͘, ēng Pe̍h-ōe-jī lâi ìn-chheh, hō͘ lín chèng-lâng khòaⁿ khah khòai bat... Lâng m̄-thang phah-sǹg in-ūi i bat Khóng-chú-jī só͘-í m̄-bián o̍h chit-hō ê jī; iā m̄-thang khòaⁿ-khin i, kóng sī gín-á só͘-tha̍k--ê.

Because the characters in your country are so difficult only a few people are literate. Therefore, we have striven to print books in Pe̍h-ōe-jī to help you to read... don't think that if you know Chinese characters you needn't learn this script, nor should you regard it as a childish thing.

— Thomas Barclay, Tâi-oân-hú-siâⁿ Kàu-hōe-pò, Issue 1

Quanzhou and Zhangzhou are two major varieties of Southern Min, and in Xiamen they combined to form something "not Quan, not Zhang" – i.e. not one or the other, but rather a fusion, which became known as Amoy Dialect or Amoy Chinese. In Taiwan, with its mixture of migrants from both Quanzhou and Zhangzhou, the linguistic situation was similar; although the resulting blend in the southern city of Tainan differed from the Xiamen blend, it was close enough that the missionaries could ignore the differences and import their system wholesale.

The fact that religious tracts, dictionaries, and teaching guides already existed in the Xiamen tongue meant that the missionaries in Taiwan could begin proselytizing immediately, without the intervening time needed to write those materials.

Missionary opinion was divided on whether POJ was desirable as an end in itself as a full-fledged orthography, or as a means to literacy in Chinese characters. William Campbell described POJ as a step on the road to reading and writing the characters, claiming that to promote it as an independent writing system would inflame nationalist passions in China, where characters were considered a sacred part of Chinese culture. Taking the other side, Thomas Barclay believed that literacy in POJ should be a goal rather than a waypoint:

Soon after my arrival in Formosa I became firmly convinced of three things, and more than fifty years experience has strengthened my conviction. The first was that if you are to have a healthy, living Church it is necessary that all the members, men and women, read the Scriptures for themselves; second, that this end can never be attained by the use of the Chinese character; third, that it can be attained by the use of the alphabetic script, this Romanised Vernacular.

— Thomas Barclay

A great boon to the promotion of POJ in Taiwan came in 1880 when James Laidlaw Maxwell, a medical missionary based in Tainan, started promoting POJ for writing the Bible, hymns, newspapers, and magazines. He donated a small printing press to the local church, which Thomas Barclay learned how to operate in 1881 before founding the Presbyterian Church Press in 1884. Subsequently, the Taiwan Prefectural City Church News, which first appeared in 1885 and was produced by Barclay's Presbyterian Church of Taiwan Press, became the first printed newspaper in Taiwan, marking the establishment of POJ in Taiwan, giving rise to numerous literary works written in POJ.

As other authors made their own alterations to the conventions laid down by Medhurst and Doty, Pe̍h-ōe-jī evolved and eventually settled into its current form. Ernest Tipson's 1934 pocket dictionary was the first reference work to reflect this modern spelling. Between Medhurst's dictionary of 1832 and the standardization of POJ in Tipson's time, there were a number of works published, which can be used to chart the change over time of Pe̍h-ōe-jī:

Evolution of Pe̍h-ōe-jī, 1832–1934
Year	Author	Pe̍h-ōe-jī spellings comparison									Source
Year	Author	[tɕ]	[ts]	[ŋ]	[ɪɛn]/[ɛn]	[iɛt̚]	[ɪk]	[iŋ]	[ɔ]	[◌ʰ]	Source
1832	Medhurst	ch		gn	ëen	ëet	ek	eng	oe	'h	
1853	Doty	ch		ng	ian	iat	iek	ieng	o͘	'	
1869	MacGowan	ts		ng	ien	iet	ek	eng	o͘	h	
1873	Douglas	ch	ts	ng	ien	iet	ek	eng	ɵ͘	h	
1894	Van Nest Talmage	ch		ng	ian	iat	ek	eng	o͘	h	
1911	Warnshuis & de Pree	ch		ng	ian	iat	ek	eng	o͘	h	
1913	Campbell	ch	ts	ng	ian	iat	ek	eng	o͘	h	
1923	Barclay	ch	ts	ng	ian	iet	ek	eng	o͘	h	
1934	Tipson	ch		ng	ian	iat	ek	eng	o͘	h	

Taiwanese kana used as ruby characters

Competition for POJ was introduced during the Japanese era in Taiwan (1895–1945) in the form of Taiwanese kana, a system designed as a teaching aid and pronunciation guide, rather than an independent orthography like POJ.

During the Japanese rule period, the Japanese government began suppressing POJ, banning classes, and forcing the cessation of publications like the Taiwan Church News. From the 1930s onwards, with the increasing militarization of Japan and the Kōminka movement encouraging Taiwanese people to "Japanize", there were a raft of measures taken against native languages, including Taiwanese. While these moves resulted in a suppression of POJ, they were "a logical consequence of increasing the amount of education in Japanese, rather than an explicit attempt to ban a particular Taiwanese orthography in favor of Taiwanese kana".

The Second Sino-Japanese War beginning in 1937 brought stricter measures into force, and along with the outlawing of romanized Taiwanese, various publications were prohibited and Confucian-style shobō (Chinese: 書房; pinyin: shūfáng; Pe̍h-ōe-jī: su-pâng) – private schools which taught Classical Chinese with literary Southern Min pronunciation – were closed down in 1939. The Japanese authorities came to perceive POJ as an obstacle to Japanization and also suspected that POJ was being used to hide "concealed codes and secret revolutionary messages". In the climate of the ongoing war the government banned the Taiwan Church News in 1942 as it was written in POJ.

=== After World War II ===
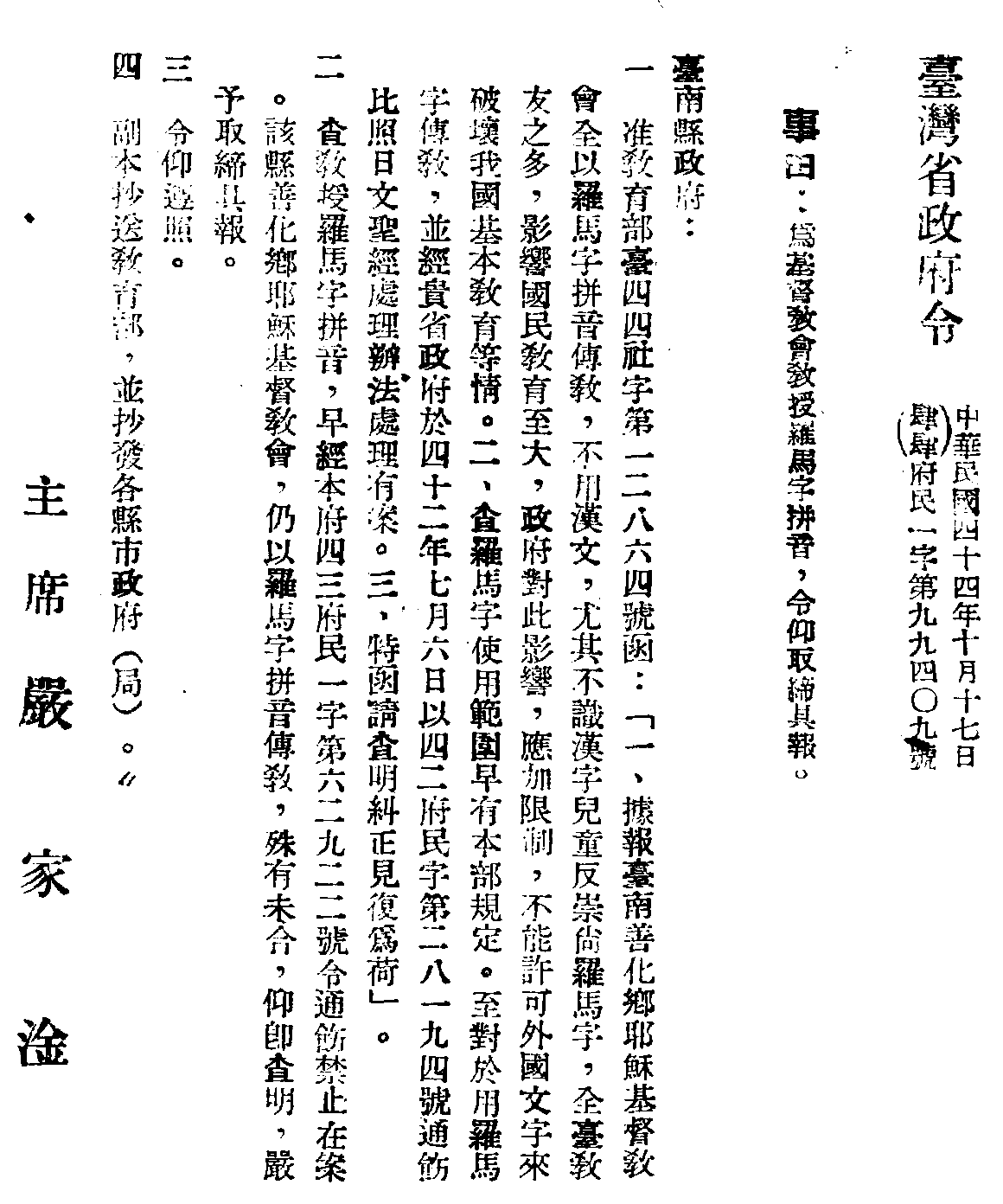
A decree (1955) banning Pe̍h-ōe-jī.

Initially the Kuomintang government in Taiwan had a liberal attitude towards "local dialects" (i.e. non-Mandarin varieties of Chinese). The National Languages Committee produced booklets outlining versions of Zhuyin fuhao for writing the Taiwanese tongue, these being intended for newly arrived government officials from outside Taiwan as well as local Taiwanese. The first government action against native languages came in 1953, when the use of Taiwanese or Japanese for instruction was forbidden. The next move to suppress the movement came in 1955, when the use of POJ for proselytizing was outlawed. At that point in time there were 115,000 people literate in POJ in Taiwan, Fujian, and southeast Asia.

Two years later, missionaries were banned from using romanized bibles, and the use of "native languages" (i.e. Taiwanese Hokkien, Hakka, and the non-Sinitic Formosan languages) in church work became illegal. The ban on POJ bibles was overturned in 1959, but churches were "encouraged" to use character bibles instead. Government activities against POJ intensified in the late 1960s and early 1970s, when several publications were banned or seized in an effort to prevent the spread of the romanization. In 1964, use of Taiwanese in schools or official settings was forbidden, and transgression in schools was punished with beatings, fines and humiliation. The Taiwan Church News (printed in POJ) was banned in 1969, and only allowed to return a year later when the publishers agreed to print it in Chinese characters. In the 1970s, the Nationalist government in Taiwan completely prohibited the use of POJ, causing it to decline.

In 1974, the Government Information Office banned A Dictionary of Southern Min, with a government official saying: "We have no objection to the dictionary being used by foreigners. They could use it in mimeographed form. But we don't want it published as a book and sold publicly because of the Romanization it contains. Chinese should not be learning Chinese through Romanization." Also in the 1970s, a POJ New Testament translation known as the "Red Cover Bible" (Âng-phoê Sèng-keng) was confiscated and banned by the Nationalist regime. Official moves against native languages continued into the 1980s, the Ministry of Education and the Ministry of the Interior decided in 1984 to forbid missionaries to use "local dialects" and romanizations in their work.

It was not until the late 1980s, with the lifting of martial law, that POJ slowly regained momentum under the influence of the native language movement. With the ending of martial law in 1987, the restrictions on "local languages" were quietly lifted, resulting in growing interest in Taiwanese writing during the 1990s. For the first time since the 1950s, Taiwanese language and literature was discussed and debated openly in newspapers and journals. There was also support from the then opposition party, the Democratic Progressive Party, for writing in the language. From a total of 26 documented orthographies for Taiwanese in 1987 (including defunct systems), there were a further 38 invented from 1987 to 1999, including 30 different romanizations, six adaptations of bopomofo and two hangul-like systems. Some commentators believe that the Kuomintang, while steering clear of outright banning of the native language movements after the end of martial law, took a "divide and conquer" approach by promoting Taiwanese Language Phonetic Alphabet (TLPA), an alternative to POJ, which was at the time the choice of the majority within the nativization movement.

Native language education has remained a fiercely debated topic in Taiwan into the 21st century and is the subject of much political wrangling.

== Current system ==
The current system of Pe̍h-ōe-jī has been stable since the 1930s, with a few minor exceptions (detailed below). There is a fair degree of similarity with the Vietnamese alphabet, including the ⟨b/p/ph⟩ distinction and the use of ⟨ơ⟩ in Vietnamese compared with ⟨o͘⟩ in POJ. POJ uses the following letters and combinations:

Capital letters	A	B	CH	CHH	E	G	H	I	J	K	KH	L	M	N	ᴺ	NG	O	O͘	P	PH	S	T	TH	U
Lowercase letters	a	b	ch	chh	e	g	h	i	j	k	kh	l	m	n	ⁿ	ng	o	o͘	p	ph	s	t	th	u
Letter names	a	be	che	chhe	e	ge	ha	i	ji̍t	ka	kha	é-luh	é-muh	é-nuh	iⁿ	ng	o	o͘	pe	phe	e-suh	te	the	u

Chinese phonology traditionally divides syllables in Chinese into three parts; firstly the initial, a consonant or consonant blend which appears at the beginning of the syllable, secondly the final, consisting of a medial vowel (optional), a nucleus vowel, and an optional ending; and finally the tone, which is applied to the whole syllable. In terms of the non-tonal (i.e. phonemic) features, the nucleus vowel is the only required part of a licit syllable in Chinese varieties. Unlike Mandarin but like other southern varieties of Chinese, Taiwanese has final stop consonants with no audible release, a feature that has been preserved from Middle Chinese. There is some debate as to whether these stops are a tonal feature or a phonemic one, with some authorities distinguishing between ⟨-h⟩ as a tonal feature, and ⟨-p⟩, ⟨-t⟩, and ⟨-k⟩ as phonemic features. Southern Min dialects also have an optional nasal property, which is written with a superscript ⟨ⁿ⟩ and usually identified as being part of the vowel. Vowel nasalisation also occurs in words that have nasal initials (⟨m-⟩, ⟨n-⟩, ⟨ng-⟩), however in this case superscript ⟨ⁿ⟩ is not written, e.g. 卵 nūi ([nuĩ]). The letter ⁿ appears at the end of a word except in some interjections, such as haⁿh ([hãʔ]), however more conservative users of Pe̍h-ōe-jī write such words as hahⁿ.

A valid syllable in Hokkien takes the form (initial) + (medial vowel) + nucleus + (stop) + tone, where items in parentheses indicate optional components.

The initials are:

		Bilabial	Alveolar	Alveolo-palatal	Velar	Glottal
Nasal		m [m] ㄇ 毛 (mo͘)	n [n] ㄋ 耐 (nāi)		ng [ŋ] ㄫ 雅 (ngá)	
Stop	Unaspirated	p [p] ㄅ 邊 (pian)	t [t] ㄉ 地 (tē)		k [k] ㄍ 求 (kiû)	
Stop	Aspirated	ph [pʰ] ㄆ 波 (pho)	th [tʰ] ㄊ 他 (thaⁿ)		kh [kʰ] ㄎ 去 (khì)	
Stop	Voiced	b [b] ㆠ 文 (bûn)			g [ɡ] ㆣ 語 (gí)	
Affricate	Unaspirated		ch [ts] ㄗ 曾 (chan)	chi [tɕ] ㄐ 尖 (chiam)		
Affricate	Aspirated		chh [tsʰ] ㄘ 出 (chhut)	chhi [tɕʰ] ㄑ 手 (chhiú)		
Affricate	Voiced		j [dz] ㆡ 熱 (joa̍h)	ji [dʑ] ㆢ 入 (ji̍p)		
Fricative			s [s] ㄙ 衫 (saⁿ)	si [ɕ] ㄒ 寫 (siá)		h [h] ㄏ 喜 (hí)
Lateral			l [ɭ/ɾ] ㄌ 柳 (liú)			

Vowels:

Monophthongs
	Front		Central	Back	
	Oral	Nasal	Central	Oral	Nasal
Close	i [i] ㄧ 衣 (i)	iⁿ [ĩ] ㆪ 圓 (îⁿ)		u [u] ㄨ 污 (u)	uⁿ [ũ] ㆫ 張 (tiuⁿ)
Mid	e [e] ㆤ 禮 (lé)	eⁿ [ẽ] ㆥ 生 (seⁿ)	o [ə] ㄜ 高 (ko)	o͘ [ɔ] ㆦ 烏 (o͘)	oⁿ [ɔ̃] ㆧ 翁 (oⁿ)
Open	a [a] ㄚ 查 (cha)	aⁿ [ã] ㆩ 衫 (saⁿ)			

Diphthongs & Triphthongs
Diphthongs	ai [aɪ] ㄞ	au [aʊ] ㄠ	ia [ɪa] ㄧㄚ	io [ɪo] ㄧㄜ
Diphthongs	iu [iu] ㄧㄨ	oa [ua] ㄨㄚ	oe [ue] ㄨㆤ	ui [ui] ㄨㄧ
Triphthongs	iau [ɪaʊ] ㄧㄠ		oai [uai] ㄨㄞ	

Coda endings:

	Bilabial	Alveolar	Velar	Glottal
Nasal consonant	-m [m] ㆬ	-n [n] ㄣ	-ng [ŋ] ㆭ	
Stop consonant	-p [p̚] ㆴ	-t [t̚] ㆵ	-k [k̚] ㆶ	-h [ʔ] ㆷ

Syllabic consonant
	Bilabial	Velar
Nasal	m [m̩] ㆬ 姆 (ḿ)	ng [ŋ̍] ㆭ 酸 (sng)

POJ has a limited amount of legitimate syllables, although sources disagree on some particular instances of these syllables. The following table contains all the licit spellings of POJ syllables, based on a number of sources:

Licit POJ syllables

	∅	b	ch	chh	g	h	j	k	kh	l	m	n	ng	p	ph	s	t	th	
a	a	ba	cha	chha	ga	ha		ka	kha	la	ma	na	nga	pa	pha	sa	ta	tha	a
aⁿ	aⁿ		chaⁿ	chhaⁿ		haⁿ		kaⁿ	khaⁿ						phaⁿ	saⁿ	taⁿ	thaⁿ	aⁿ
ah	ah	bah	chah	chhah		hah		kah	khah	lah		nah		pah	phah	sah	tah	thah	ah
ahⁿ						hahⁿ										sahⁿ			ahⁿ
ai	ai	bai	chai	chhai	gai	hai		kai	khai	lai	mai	nai	ngai	pai	phai	sai	tai	thai	ai
aiⁿ	aiⁿ		chaiⁿ			haiⁿ		kaiⁿ	khaiⁿ						phaiⁿ		taiⁿ		aiⁿ
ak	ak	bak	chak	chhak	gak	hak		kak	khak	lak				pak	phak	sak	tak	thak	ak
am	am		cham	chham	gam	ham		kam	kham	lam						sam	tam	tham	am
an	an	ban	chan	chhan	gan	han		kan	khan	lan				pan	phan	san	tan	than	an
ang	ang	bang	chang	chhang	gang	hang		kang	khang	lang				pang	phang	sang	tang	thang	ang
ap	ap		chap	chhap		hap		kap	khap	lap						sap	tap	thap	ap
at	at	bat	chat	chhat		hat		kat	khat	lat				pat		sat	tat	that	at
au	au	bau	chau	chhau	gau	hau		kau	khau	lau	mau	nau	ngau	pau	phau	sau	tau	thau	au
auh				chhauh				kauh		lauh	mauh	nauh			phauh		tauh		auh
e	e	be	che	chhe	ge	he		ke	khe	le	me	ne	nge	pe	phe	se	te	the	e
eⁿ	eⁿ		cheⁿ	chheⁿ		heⁿ		keⁿ	kheⁿ					peⁿ	pheⁿ	seⁿ	teⁿ	theⁿ	eⁿ
eh	eh	beh	cheh	chheh		heh		keh	kheh	leh	meh	neh	ngeh	peh		seh	teh	theh	eh
ehⁿ						hehⁿ			khehⁿ										ehⁿ
ek	ek	bek	chek	chhek	gek	hek		kek		lek				pek	phek	sek	tek	thek	ek
eng	eng	beng	cheng	chheng	geng	heng		keng	kheng	leng				peng	pheng	seng	teng	theng	eng
i	i	bi	chi	chhi	gi	hi	ji	ki	khi	li	mi	ni		pi	phi	si	ti	thi	i
iⁿ	iⁿ		chiⁿ	chhiⁿ		hiⁿ		kiⁿ	khiⁿ							siⁿ	tiⁿ	thiⁿ	iⁿ
ia	ia		chia	chhia	gia	hia	jia	kia	khia		mia	nia	ngia			sia	tia		ia
iaⁿ	iaⁿ		chiaⁿ	chhiaⁿ		hiaⁿ		kiaⁿ						piaⁿ		siaⁿ	tiaⁿ	thiaⁿ	iaⁿ
iah	iah		chiah	chhiah	giah	hiah		kiah	khiah	liah				piah	phiah	siah	tiah	thiah	iah
iahⁿ						hiahⁿ													iahⁿ
iak				chhiak					khiak					piak	phiak	siak	tiak		iak
iam	iam		chiam	chhiam	giam	hiam	jiam	kiam	khiam	liam						siam	tiam	thiam	iam
ian	ian	bian	chian	chhian	gian	hian	jian	kian	khian	lian				pian	phian	sian	tian	thian	ian
iang	iang		chiang	chhiang	giang	hiang	jiang		khiang	liang				piang	phiang	siang			iang
iap	iap		chiap	chhiap	giap	hiap	jiap	kiap	khiap	liap						siap	tiap	thiap	iap
iat	iat	biat	chiat	chhiat	giat	hiat	jiat	kiat	khiat	liat				piat	phiat	siat	tiat	thiat	iat
iau	iau	biau	chiau	chhiau	giau	hiau	jiau	kiau	khiau	liau	miau	niau	ngiau	piau	phiau	siau	tiau	thiau	iau
iauⁿ	iauⁿ																		iauⁿ
iauh						hiauh			khiauh				ngiauh						iauh
ih		bih	chih	chhih					khih		mih	nih		pih	phih	sih	tih	thih	ih
im	im		chim	chhim	gim	him	jim	kim	khim	lim						sim	tim	thim	im
in	in	bin	chin	chhin	gin	hin	jin	kin	khin	lin				pin	phin	sin	tin	thin	in
io	io	bio	chio	chhio	gio	hio	jio	kio	khio	lio				pio	phio	sio	tio	thio	io
ioh	ioh		chioh	chhioh	gioh	hioh		kioh	khioh	lioh						sioh	tioh		ioh
iok	iok		chiok	chhiok	giok	hiok	jiok	kiok	khiok	liok						siok	tiok	thiok	iok
iong	iong		chiong	chhiong	giong	hiong	jiong	kiong	khiong	liong						siong	tiong	thiong	iong
ip	ip		chip	chhip		hip	jip	kip	khip	lip						sip			ip
it	it	bit	chit	chhit		hit	jit	kit	khit					pit	phit	sit	tit		it
iu	iu	biu	chiu	chhiu	giu	hiu	jiu	kiu	khiu	liu	miu	niu		piu		siu	tiu	thiu	iu
iuⁿ	iuⁿ		chiuⁿ	chhiuⁿ		hiuⁿ		kiuⁿ	khiuⁿ							siuⁿ	tiuⁿ		iuⁿ
iuhⁿ	iuhⁿ					hiuhⁿ													iuhⁿ
m	m					hm													m
mh						hmh													mh
ng	ng		chng	chhng		hng		kng	khng		mng	nng		png		sng	tng	thng	ng
ngh				chhngh		hngh									phngh	sngh			ngh
o	o	bo	cho	chho	go	ho		ko	kho	lo				po	pho	so	to	tho	o
oⁿ	oⁿ					hoⁿ		koⁿ											oⁿ
o͘	o͘	bo͘	cho͘	chho͘	go͘	ho͘		ko͘	kho͘	lo͘	mo͘	no͘	ngo͘	po͘	pho͘	so͘	to͘	tho͘	o͘
oa	oa	boa	choa	chhoa	goa	hoa		koa	khoa	loa	moa	noa		poa	phoa	soa	toa	thoa	oa
oaⁿ	oaⁿ			chhoaⁿ		hoaⁿ		koaⁿ	khoaⁿ					poaⁿ	phoaⁿ	soaⁿ	toaⁿ	thoaⁿ	oaⁿ
oah	oah	boah	choah	chhoah		hoah	joah	koah	khoah	loah				poah	phoah	soah		thoah	oah
oai	oai					hoai		koai	khoai							soai			oai
oaiⁿ	oaiⁿ		choaiⁿ			hoaiⁿ		koaiⁿ								soaiⁿ			oaiⁿ
oan	oan	boan	choan	chhoan	goan	hoan		koan	khoan	loan				poan	phoan	soan	toan	thoan	oan
oang	oang			chhoang		hoang													oang
oat	oat	boat	choat		goat	hoat		koat	khoat	loat				poat	phoat	soat	toat	thoat	oat
oe	oe	boe	choe	chhoe	goe	hoe	joe	koe	khoe	loe				poe	phoe	soe	toe		oe
oeh	oeh	boeh			goeh	hoeh		koeh	khoeh					poeh	phoeh	soeh			oeh
oh	oh		choh	chhoh		hoh		koh		loh				poh	phoh	soh	toh	thoh	oh
o͘h											mo͘h								o͘h
ohⁿ	ohⁿ					hohⁿ													ohⁿ
ok	ok	bok	chok	chhok	gok	hok		kok	khok	lok				pok	phok	sok	tok	thok	ok
om	om															som	tom		om
ong	ong	bong	chong	chhong	gong	hong		kong	khong	long				pong	phong	song	tong	thong	ong
u	u	bu	chu	chhu	gu	hu	ju	ku	khu	lu				pu	phu	su	tu	thu	u
uh	uh		chuh	chhuh					khuh					puh	phuh		tuh	thuh	uh
ui	ui	bui	chui	chhui	gui	hui		kui	khui	lui	mui			pui	phui	sui	tui	thui	ui
un	un	bun	chun	chhun	gun	hun	jun	kun	khun	lun				pun	phun	sun	tun	thun	un
ut	ut	but	chut	chhut		hut		kut	khut	lut				put	phut	sut	tut	thut	ut
	∅	b	ch	chh	g	h	j	k	kh	l	m	n	ng	p	ph	s	t	th	

Sources: Campbell, Embree, Kì.

=== Tone markings ===
No.	Diacritic	Chinese tone name	Example
1	—N/a	陰平 (yīnpíng) dark level	kha 跤 foot; leg
2	acute	上聲 (shǎngshēng) rising	chúi 水 water
3	grave	陰去 (yīnqù) dark departing	kàu 到 arrive
4	—N/a	陰入 (yīnrù) dark entering	bah 肉 meat
5	circumflex	陽平 (yángpíng) light level	ông 王 king
7	macron	陽去 (yángqù) light departing	tiōng 重 heavy
8	vertical line above	陽入 (yángrù) light entering	joa̍h 熱 hot

The five tone markings used in Pe̍h-ōe-jī, representing tones 2, 3, 5, 7, and 8

In standard Amoy or Taiwanese Hokkien there are seven distinct tones, which by convention are numbered 1–8, with number 6 omitted (tone 6 used to be a distinct tone, but has long since merged with tone 7 or 2 depending on lexical register). Tones 1 and 4 are both represented without a diacritic, and can be distinguished from each other by the syllable ending, which is a vowel, ⟨-n⟩, ⟨-m⟩, or ⟨-ng⟩ for tone 1, and ⟨-h⟩, ⟨-k⟩, ⟨-p⟩, and ⟨-t⟩ for tone 4.

Southern Min dialects undergo considerable tone sandhi, i.e. changes to the tone depending on the position of the syllable in any given sentence or utterance. However, like pinyin for Mandarin Chinese, POJ always marks the citation tone (i.e. the original, pre-sandhi tone) rather than the tone which is actually spoken. This means that when reading aloud the reader must adjust the tone markings on the page to account for sandhi. Some textbooks for learners of Southern Min mark both the citation tone and the sandhi tone to assist the learner.

There is some debate as to the correct placement of tone marks in the case of diphthongs and triphthongs, particularly those which include ⟨oa⟩ and ⟨oe⟩. Most modern writers follow six rules:

1. If the syllable has one vowel, that vowel should be tone-marked; viz. ⟨tī⟩, ⟨láng⟩, ⟨chhu̍t⟩
2. If a diphthong contains ⟨i⟩ or ⟨u⟩, the tone mark goes above the other vowel; viz. ⟨ia̍h⟩, ⟨kiò⟩, ⟨táu⟩
3. If a diphthong includes both ⟨i⟩ and ⟨u⟩, mark the ⟨u⟩; viz. ⟨iû⟩, ⟨ùi⟩
4. If the final is made up of three or more letters, mark the second vowel (except when rules 2 and 3 apply); viz. ⟨goán⟩, ⟨oāi⟩, ⟨khiáu⟩
5. If ⟨o⟩ occurs with ⟨a⟩ or ⟨e⟩, mark the ⟨o⟩ (except when rule 4 applies); viz. ⟨òa⟩, ⟨thóe⟩
6. If the syllable has no vowel, mark the nasal consonant; viz. ⟨m̄⟩, ⟨ǹg⟩, ⟨mn̂g⟩

=== Hyphens ===
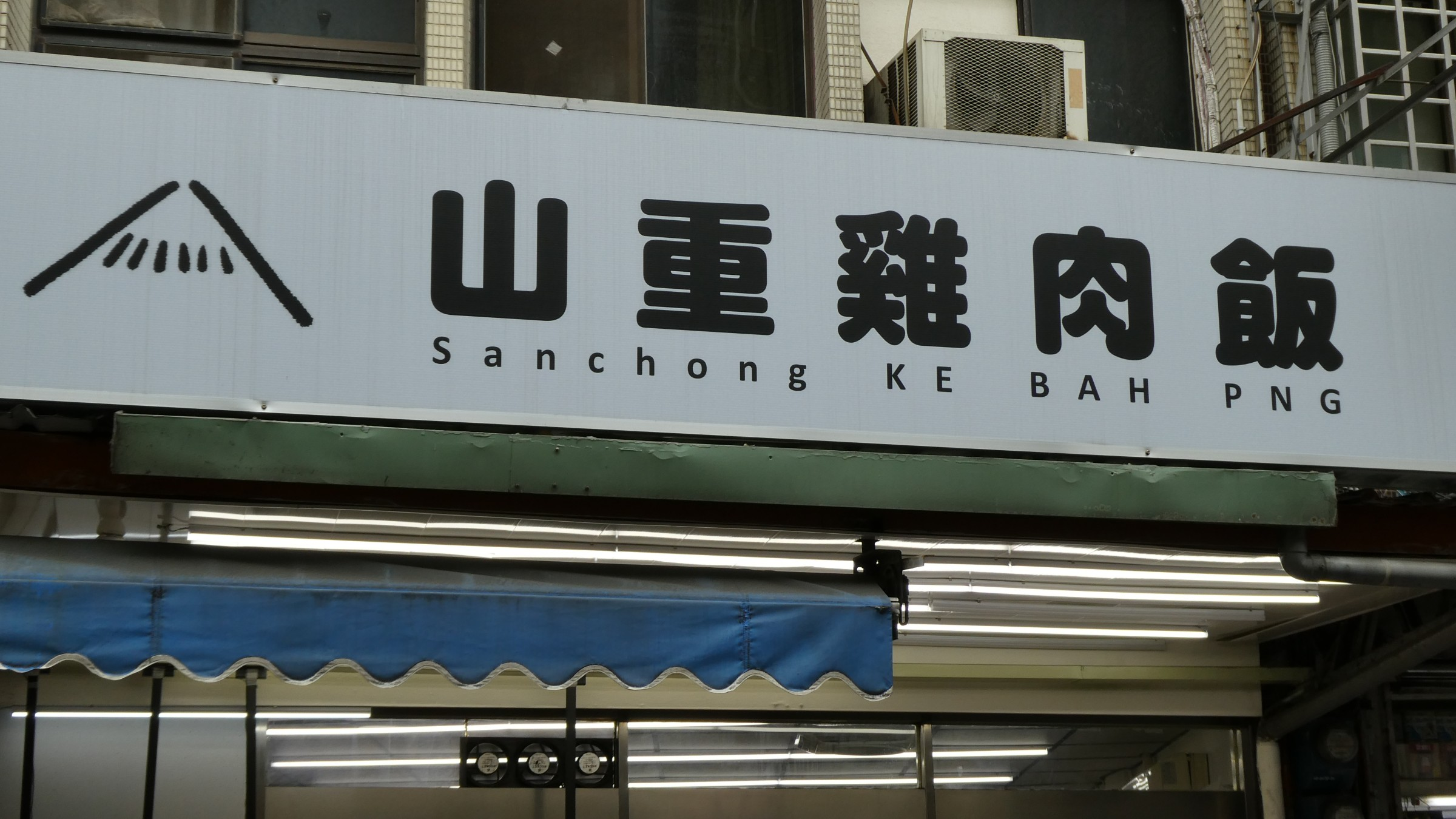
A sign over a chicken rice restaurant in Sanchong, Taiwan, reading Ke Bah Png with no diacritics or hyphens. It would be correctly written as ke-bah-pn̄g, or koe-bah-pn̄g in the local pronunciation.

A single hyphen is used to indicate a compound. What constitutes a compound is controversial, with some authors equating it to a "word" in English, and others not willing to limit it to the English concept of a word. Examples from POJ include ⟨sì-cha̍p⟩ "forty", ⟨bé-hì-thôan⟩ "circus", and ⟨hôe-ho̍k⟩ "recover (from illness)". The non-final syllables of a compound typically undergo tone sandhi, but exact rules have not been clearly identified by linguists.

A double hyphen ⟨--⟩ is used when POJ is deployed as an orthography (rather than as a transcription system) to indicate that the following syllable should be pronounced in the neutral tone. It also marks to the reader that the preceding syllable does not undergo tone sandhi, as it would were the following syllable non-neutral. Morphemes following a double hyphen are often (but not always) grammatical function words. Some authors use an interpunct ⟨·⟩ in place of the second hyphen.

=== Audio examples ===
POJ	Translation	Audio File
Sian-siⁿ kóng, ha̍k-seng tiām-tiām thiaⁿ.	A teacher/master speaks, students quietly listen.
Kin-á-jit hit-ê cha-bó͘ gín-á lâi góan tau khòaⁿ góa.	Today that girl came to my house to see me.
Thài-khong pêng-iú, lín-hó. Lín chia̍h-pá--bē? Ū-êng, to̍h lâi gún chia chē--ô͘!	Space friends, how are you? Have you eaten yet? When you have the time, you must come over and visit!	Listen (from NASA Voyager Golden Record)

=== Regional differences ===
In addition to the standard syllables detailed above, there are several regional variations of Hokkien which can be represented with non-standard or semi-standard spellings. In the Zhangzhou-type varieties, spoken in Zhangzhou, parts of Taiwan (particularly the northeastern coast around Yilan City), and parts of Malaysia (particularly in Penang), there is a final ⟨-uiⁿ⟩, for example in "egg" ⟨nūi⟩ and "cooked rice" ⟨pūiⁿ⟩, which has merged with ⟨-ng⟩ in mainstream Taiwanese. Zhangzhou-type varieties may also have the vowel /ɛ/, written as ⟨ɛ⟩ or ⟨e͘ ⟩ (with a dot above right, by analogy with ⟨o͘ ⟩), which has merged with ⟨e⟩ in Taiwanese.

== Texts ==
Goân-khí-thâu Siōng-tè chhòng-chō thiⁿ kap tōe. Tōe sī khang-khang hūn-tūn; chhim-ian ê bin-chiūⁿ o͘-àm; Siōng-tè ê Sîn ūn-tōng tī chúi-bīn. Siōng-tè kóng, Tio̍h ū kng, chiū ū kng. Siōng-tè khòaⁿ kng, sī hó; Siōng-tè chiong kng àm pun-khui. Siōng-tè kiò hit ê kng chòe Ji̍t, kiò àm chòe Mî. Ū ê-hng ū chá-khí sī thâu chi̍t-ji̍t.

— Genesis 1:1–5

Due to POJ's origins in the Christian church, much of the material in the script is religious in nature, including several Bible translations, books of hymns, and guides to morality. The Tainan Church Press, established in 1884, has been printing POJ materials ever since, with periods of quiet when POJ was suppressed in the early 1940s and from around 1955 to 1987. In the period to 1955, over 2.3 million volumes of POJ books were printed, and one study in 2002 catalogued 840 different POJ texts in existence. Besides a Southern Min version of Wikipedia in the orthography, there are teaching materials, religious texts, and books about linguistics, medicine and geography.

- Lán ê Kiù-chú Iâ-so͘ Ki-tok ê Sin-iok (1873 translation of the New Testament)
- Lāi-goā-kho Khàn-hō͘-ha̍k, by George Gushue-Taylor, 1917
- Chinese–English dictionary of the vernacular or spoken language of Amoy, by Carstairs Douglas, 1873
- Lear Ông, translation of King Lear by Tē Hūi-hun

== Computing ==
POJ was initially not well supported by word-processing applications due to the special diacritics needed to write it. Support has now improved and there are now sufficient resources to both enter and display POJ correctly. Several input methods exist to enter Unicode-compliant POJ, including OpenVanilla (macOS and Microsoft Windows), the cross-platform Tai-lo Input Method released by the Taiwanese Ministry of Education, and the Firefox add-on Transliterator, which allows in-browser POJ input. When POJ was first used in word-processing applications it was not fully supported by the Unicode standard, thus necessitating work-arounds. One employed was encoding the necessary characters in the "Private Use" section of Unicode, but this required both the writer and the reader to have the correct custom font installed. Another solution was to replace troublesome characters with near equivalents, for example substituting ⟨ä⟩ for ⟨ā⟩ or using a standard ⟨o⟩ followed by an interpunct to represent ⟨o͘⟩. With the introduction into Unicode 4.1.0 of the combining character U+0358 ◌͘ COMBINING DOT ABOVE RIGHT in 2004, all the necessary characters were present to write regular POJ without the need for workarounds. However, even after the addition of these characters, there are still relatively few fonts which are able to properly render the script, including the combining characters.

=== Unicode codepoints ===
The following are tone characters and their respective Unicode codepoints used in POJ. The tones used by POJ should use Combining Diacritical Marks instead of Spacing Modifier Letters used by bopomofo. As POJ is not encoded in Big5, the prevalent encoding used in Traditional Chinese, some POJ letters are not directly encoded in Unicode, instead should be typed using combining diacritical marks officially.

POJ tone diacritics^{[1]}
Base letter/Tone 1		Tone 2	Tone 3	Tone 4	Tone 5	Tone 7	Tone 8	Variant
Combining mark		́ (U+0301)	̀ (U+0300)	h	̂ (U+0302)	̄ (U+0304)	̍h (U+030D)	˘ (U+0306)
One mark
Uppercase	A	Á (U+00C1)	À (U+00C0)	AH	Â (U+00C2)	Ā (U+0100)	A̍H (U+0041 U+030D)	Ă (U+0102)
Uppercase	E	É (U+00C9)	È (U+00C8)	EH	Ê (U+00CA)	Ē (U+0112)	E̍H (U+0045 U+030D)	Ĕ (U+0114)
Uppercase	I	Í (U+00CD)	Ì (U+00CC)	IH	Î (U+00CE)	Ī (U+012A)	I̍H (U+0049 U+030D)	Ĭ (U+012C)
Uppercase	O	Ó (U+00D3)	Ò (U+00D2)	OH	Ô (U+00D4)	Ō (U+014C)	O̍H (U+004F U+030D)	Ŏ (U+014E)
Uppercase	U	Ú (U+00DA)	Ù (U+00D9)	UH	Û (U+00DB)	Ū (U+016A)	U̍H (U+0055 U+030D)	Ŭ (U+016C)
Uppercase	M	Ḿ (U+1E3E)	M̀ (U+004D U+0300)	MH	M̂ (U+004D U+0302)	M̄ (U+004D U+0304)	M̍H (U+004D U+030D)	M̆ (U+004D U+0306)
Uppercase	N	Ń (U+0143)	Ǹ (U+01F8)	NH	N̂ (U+004E U+0302)	N̄ (U+004E U+0304)	N̍H (U+004E U+030D)	N̆ (U+004E U+0306)
Lowercase	a	á (U+00E1)	à (U+00E0)	ah	â (U+00E2)	ā (U+0101)	a̍h (U+0061 U+030D)	ă (U+0103)
Lowercase	e	é (U+00E9)	è (U+00E8)	eh	ê (U+00EA)	ē (U+0113)	e̍h (U+0065 U+030D)	ĕ (U+0115)
Lowercase	i	í (U+00ED)	ì (U+00EC)	ih	î (U+00EE)	ī (U+012B)	i̍h (U+0069 U+030D)	ĭ (U+012D)
Lowercase	o	ó (U+00F3)	ò (U+00F2)	oh	ô (U+00F4)	ō (U+014D)	o̍h (U+006F U+030D)	ŏ (U+014F)
Lowercase	u	ú (U+00FA)	ù (U+00F9)	uh	û (U+00FB)	ū (U+016B)	u̍h (U+0075 U+030D)	ŭ (U+016D)
Lowercase	m	ḿ (U+1E3F)	m̀ (U+006D U+0300)	mh	m̂ (U+006D U+0302)	m̄ (U+006D U+0304)	m̍h (U+006D U+030D)	m̆ (U+006D U+0306)
Lowercase	n	ń (U+0144)	ǹ (U+01F9)	nh	n̂ (U+006E U+0302)	n̄ (U+006E U+0304)	n̍h (U+006E U+030D)	n̆ (U+006E U+0306)
Two diacritics ^{[2]}
Uppercase	O͘ (U+004F U+0358)	Ó͘	Ò͘	O͘H	Ô͘	Ō͘	O̍͘H	Ŏ͘
Lowercase	o͘ (U+006F U+0358)	ó͘	ò͘	o͘h	ô͘	ō͘	o̍͘h	ŏ͘
Notes: 1. Yellow cells indicate that there are no single Unicode character for that letter; the character shown here uses Combining Diacritical Mark characters to display the letter.; 2. O͘ series may be typed with 3 different permutation: letter O + right dot (͘ , U+0358) + tones; letter O + tones + right dot (͘ , U+0358); letter O with combined tones + right dot (͘ , U+0358). The Unicode combinations are omitted here.

Superscript n is also required for POJ to indicate nasalisation:

POJ superscript
Character	Unicode codepoint
ⁿ	U+207F
ᴺ	U+1D3A

Characters not directly encoded in Unicode (especially O͘ series which has 3 different permutations) requires premade glyphs in fonts in order for applications to correctly display the characters.

=== Font support ===
Fonts that currently support POJ includes:

- Charis SIL
- DejaVu
- Doulos SIL
- Linux Libertine
- Taigi Unicode
- Source Sans Pro
- I.Ming (8.00 onwards) from Ichiten Font Project
- Fonts made by justfont foundry
- Fonts modified and release in GitHub repository POJFonts : POJ Phiaute, Gochi Hand POJ, Nunito POJ, POJ Vibes, and POJ Garamond.
- Fonts modified and released by But Ko based on Source Han Sans: Genyog, Genseki, Gensen; based on Source Han Serif: Genyo, Genwan, Genryu.

== Han-Romanization mixed script ==
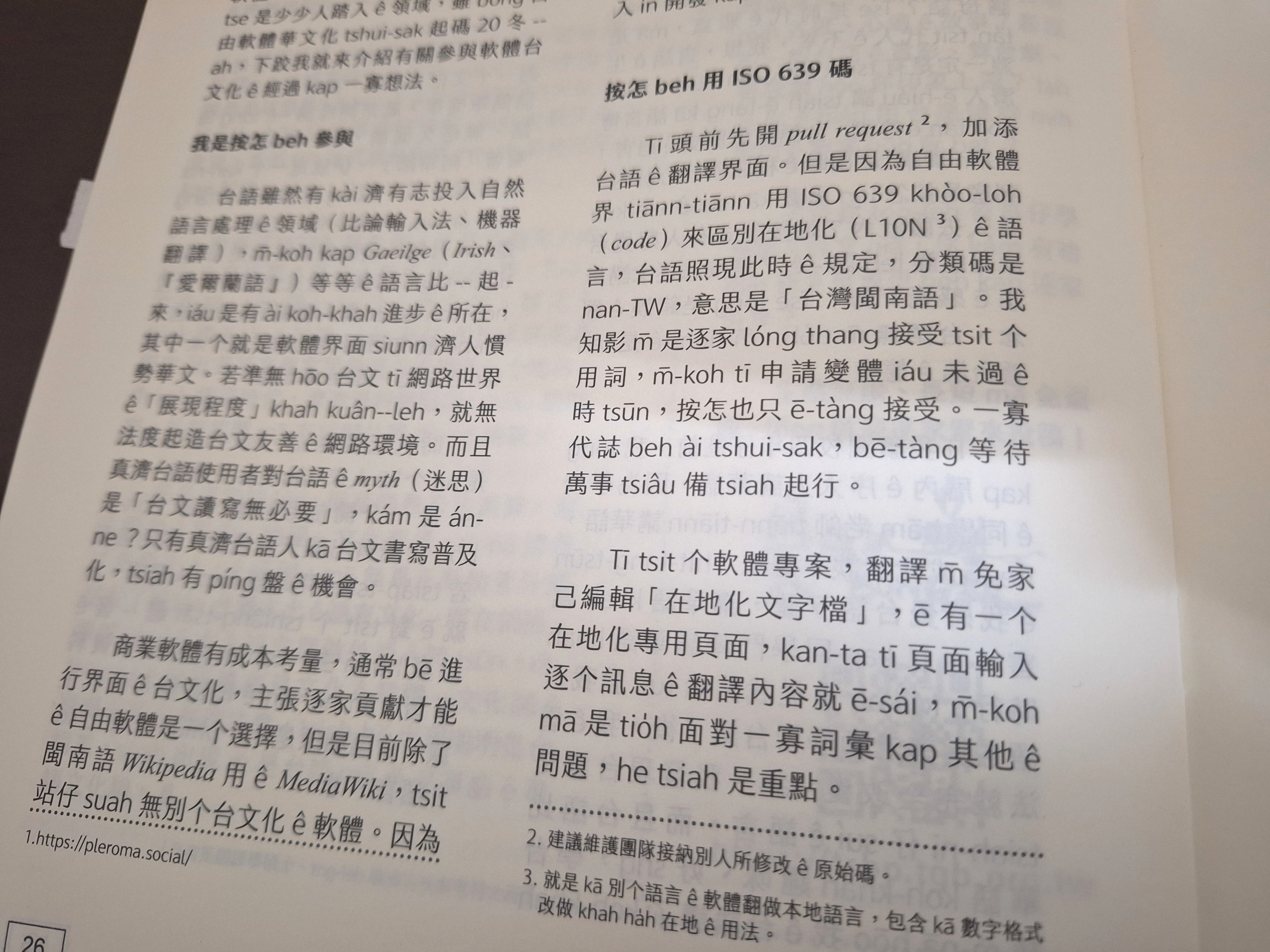
an essay about software localization in Hàn-lô style published on a Taigi magazine. Note: The orthography of the Latin part is in Tâi-lô, similar to POJ.

翻 tńg 工，我 koh hap i tī Hotel ê 餐廳食西式 ê chái 起，我講 beh tò 去稅厝 ê 所在，i beh 送我去，我 kā 拒絕，mā 無 beh hō͘ i 知我 ê 地址、電話番，講若有緣就會 koh 再相會。I 講人海茫茫，我若無 tī hit 間跳舞、唱歌，i beh 去 toh 位 chhōe--我？「就是 án-ni m̄-chiah 講是緣」，我嘴是 án-ni 應，心肝內知影 kap i 自細漢到這時 ê 牽連、綿纏無 hiah 簡單就煞。

— Sample mixed orthography text

One of the most popular modern ways of writing Taiwanese is by using a mixed orthography called Hàn-lô (simplified Chinese: 汉罗; traditional Chinese: 漢羅; pinyin: Hàn-Luó; lit. 'Chinese-Roman'), and sometimes Han-Romanization mixed script, a style not unlike written Japanese or (historically) Korean. In fact, the term Hàn-lô does not describe one specific system, but covers any kind of writing in Southern Min which features both Chinese characters and romanization. That romanization is usually POJ, although recently some texts have begun appearing with Taiwanese Romanization System (Tâi-lô) spellings too. The problem with using only Chinese characters to write Southern Min is that there are many morphemes (estimated to be around 15 percent of running text) which are not definitively associated with a particular character. Various strategies have been developed to deal with the issue, including creating new characters, allocating Chinese characters used in written Mandarin with similar meanings (but dissimilar etymology) to represent the missing characters, or using romanization for the "missing 15%". There are two rationales for using mixed orthography writing, with two different aims. The first is to allow native speakers (almost all of whom can already write Chinese characters) to make use of their knowledge of characters, while replacing the missing 15% with romanization. The second is to wean character literates off using them gradually, to be replaced eventually by fully romanized text. Examples of modern texts in Hàn-lô include religious, pedagogical, scholarly, and literary works, such as:

- Chang Yu-hong. Principles of POJ.
- Babuja A. Sidaia. A-Chhûn.

== Adaptations for other Chinese varieties ==
POJ has been adapted for several other varieties of Chinese, with varying degrees of success. For Hakka, missionaries and others have produced a Bible translation, hymn book, textbooks, and dictionaries. Materials produced in the orthography, called Pha̍k-fa-sṳ, include:

- Hak-ngi Sṳn-kin, Sin-yuk lau Sṳ-phien: Hien-thoi Thoi-van Hak-ngi Yit-pun (Hakka Bible, New Testament and Psalms: Today's Taiwan Hakka Version). Bible Society. 1993.
- Phang Tet-siu (1994). Thai-ka Loi Hok Hak-fa (Everybody Learn Hakka). Taipei: Southern Materials Center. ISBN 957-638-017-0.
- Phang Tet-siu (1996). Hak-ka-fa Fat-yim Sṳ-tien (Hakka Pronunciation Dictionary). Taipei: Southern Materials Center. ISBN 957-638-359-5.
- Hak-ka Sṳn-sṳ (Hakka Hymns). Tainan: PCT Press. 1999. ISBN 957-8349-75-0.

A modified version of POJ has also been created for Teochew.

== Current status ==
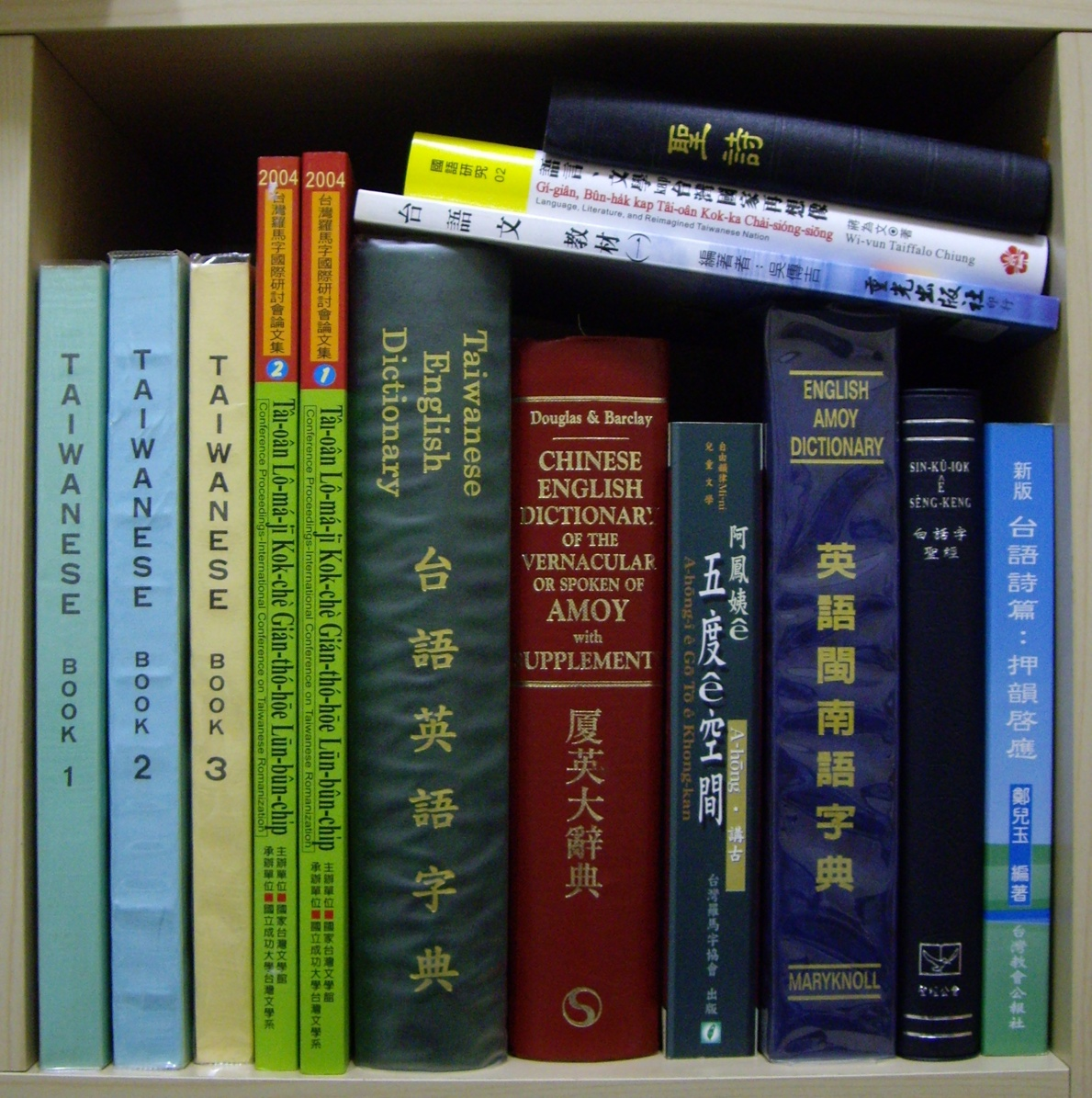
Some books which use Pe̍h-ōe-jī, including textbooks, dictionaries, a bible, poetry, and academic works

Most native Southern Min speakers in Taiwan are unfamiliar with POJ or any other writing system, commonly asserting that "Taiwanese has no writing", or, if they are made aware of POJ, considering romanization as the "low" form of writing, in contrast with the "high" form (Chinese characters). For those who are introduced to POJ alongside Hàn-lô and completely Chinese character-based systems, a clear preference has been shown for all-character systems, with all-romanization systems at the bottom of the preference list, likely because of the preexisting familiarity of readers with Chinese characters.

POJ remains the Taiwanese orthography "with the richest inventory of written work, including dictionaries, textbooks, literature [...] and other publications in many areas". A 1999 estimate put the number of literate POJ users at around 100,000, and secular organizations have been formed to promote the use of romanization among Taiwanese speakers.

Outside Taiwan, POJ is rarely used. For example, in Fujian, Xiamen University uses a romanization known as Bbánlám pìngyīm, based on Pinyin. In other areas where Hokkien is spoken, such as Singapore, the Speak Mandarin Campaign actively discourages people from speaking Hokkien or other non-Mandarin varieties in favour of switching to Mandarin instead.

In 2006, Taiwan's Ministry of Education chose an official romanization for use in teaching Southern Min in the state school system. POJ was one of the candidate systems, along with Daī-ghî tōng-iōng pīng-im, but a compromise system, the Taiwanese Romanization System or Tâi-lô, was chosen in the end. Tâi-Lô retains most of the orthographic standards of POJ, including the tone marks, while changing the troublesome ⟨o͘⟩ character for ⟨oo⟩, swapping ⟨ts⟩ for ⟨ch⟩, and replacing ⟨o⟩ in diphthongs with ⟨u⟩. Supporters of Taiwanese writing are in general deeply suspicious of government involvement, given the history of official suppression of native languages, making it unclear whether Tâi-lô or POJ will become the dominant system in the future.
