= James Laidlaw Maxwell =

English Presbyterian missionary to Formosa (1836–1921)

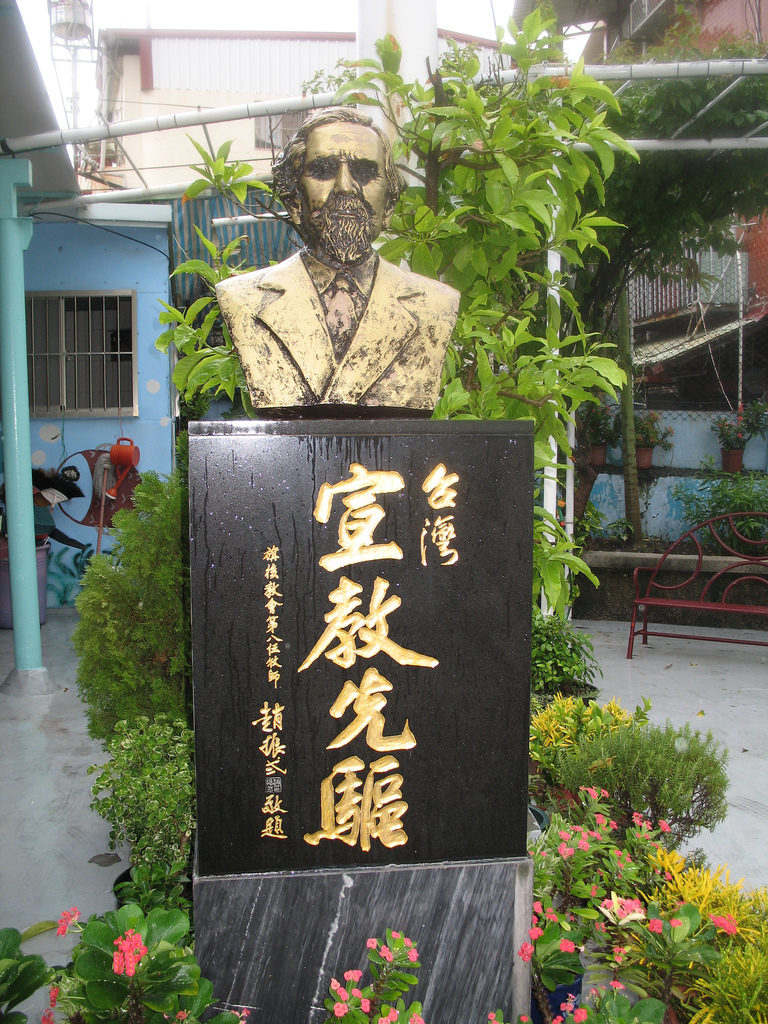
A Statue of James Laidlaw Maxwell in Kaohsiung, Taiwan.

James Laidlaw Maxwell Senior (Pe̍h-ōe-jī: Má Ngá-kok; Chinese: 馬雅各; born 18 March 1836 in Scotland – March 1921) was the first Presbyterian missionary to Formosa (Qing-era Taiwan). He served with the English Presbyterian Mission.

Maxwell studied medicine at the University of Edinburgh, completing his degree in 1858 with the thesis The Chemistry and Physiology of the Spleen. He worked in London at Brompton Hospital and at the Birmingham General Hospital. He was an elder in the Broad Street Presbyterian Church, Birmingham before being sent to Taiwan by the Presbyterian Church of England (now within the United Reformed Church) in 1864. He donated a small printing press to the church which was later used to print the Taiwan Church News.

On 16 June 1865, at the urging of missionaries H. L. Mackenzie and Carstairs Douglas, he established the first Presbyterian church in Taiwan, this date now celebrated by the Presbyterian Church in Taiwan as its anniversary. First his mission centred in the then-capital Taiwan Fu (now Tainan City); in 1868 he moved near Cijin (now part of Kaohsiung) where his work, both medical and missionary, became more welcomed. In early 1872 he advised Canadian Presbyterian missionary pioneer George Leslie Mackay to start his work in northern Taiwan, near Tamsui.

He married Mary Anne Goodall (died January 1918) of Handsworth on 7 April 1868 in Hong Kong. They had two sons, John Preston and James Laidlaw Maxwell Jr., both of whom later also became medical missionaries. He retired in London in 1885 where he formed and became the first secretary of the Medical Missionary Association. He and his sons oversaw the construction of Sin-lâu Hospital in Tainan, the first western-style hospital in Taiwan. The younger J. L. Maxwell served in the Tainan hospital from 1900 to 1923, during Taiwan's Japanese era.

== Archives ==
Papers of James Laidlaw Maxwell are held at the Cadbury Research Library (University of Birmingham) along with papers of his son, John Preston Maxwell.
