= Middle dot =

Typographical symbol

·o

Middle dot
- In Unicode: U+00B7 · MIDDLE DOT (&middot;, &CenterDot;, &centerdot;)

Different from
- Different from: U+2027 ‧ HYPHENATION POINT U+2219 ∙ BULLET OPERATOR; U+22C5 ⋅ DOT OPERATOR U+A78F ꞏ LATIN LETTER SINOLOGICAL DOT

Related
- See also: U+02D1 ˑ MODIFIER LETTER HALF TRIANGULAR COLON

A middle dot (·), also known as an interpoint, interpunct, raised dot, (Note: The "raised dot" spoken of in this context should not be confused with the Unicode character U+2E33 ⸳ RAISED DOT, which is slightly different — slightly lower than an interpunct, yet higher than a full stop.) middot, medial point, or centered dot, is a punctuation mark consisting of a vertically centered dot that appears in a variety of uses in some modern languages. (Note: The term interpunct has various definitions and characterizations, including (some implicitly in the context of Latin writing): Oxford English Dictionary (1901 edition): "A point between words in writing."; Pause and Effect (a 1993 monograph on historical European punctuation): "A point or symbol placed between words, especially in the earliest Latin manuscripts," with the examples given being the "Hedera" (❧) — given in the same glossary page, 4 entries above "interpunct" — and medial points on page 263.; Merriam-Webster Online Dictionary: "interpoint," which is itself defined as "the embossing of braille on both sides of the paper in such a way that the points of one side fall between points of the other side"; this unrelated definition goes to show that the term "interpunct" to mean a typographical symbol has not been very popular for most of the interpunct's history.; Design School Type (2017): "a typographic glyph consisting of a vertically centered dot and used to indicate syllabic separation of words".; "Proposal to Add Additional Ancient Roman Characters to UCS" (2006): "a word separator that can take many forms: triangle, wedge, x-shape, dot, slanted or curved line, etc. The Romans originally wrote with no separation between words, but beginning in the late Republic inscriptions often employ interpuncts (not spaces!) to distinguish individual words."; Latin Punctuation in the Classical Age (1972): "The single medial point became the normal word-divider in Etruscan (e.g. the Liber Zagrabiensis, c. 50 B. C.–50 A. D.) and became standard in Latin at a very early date, subject only to a few early variations in shape, evidently for decorative purposes."; Virgulae and Distinctiones (2022): "periods at mid-height"; Roman Inscriptions of Britain Online: "in Latin [...] a medial point, known as interpunct, was used to mark word division") It was often used for interword separation in Classical Latin. (Word-separating spaces did not appear until some time between 600 and 800 CE.)

The multiplication dot or "dot operator" is frequently used in mathematical and scientific notation, and it may differ in appearance from the middle dot.

== In written language ==
=== Hyphenation point ===
Various dictionaries use a hyphenation point ‧ to "indicate correct word breaking", as in syl‧la‧bi‧fi‧ca‧tion. This practice allows the hyphen (which may otherwise be used by convention for this purpose) to be reserved exclusively for instances where a true hyphen is intended — for example, self-con‧scious, un‧self-con‧scious, and long-stand‧ing. Unicode provides a dedicated character for the hyphenation point, U+2027 ‧ HYPHENATION POINT, "to be distinguished from U+00B7 · MIDDLE DOT, which has multiple semantics."

=== English ===
In British typography, the space dot was once used as the formal decimal point. Its use was advocated by laws and can still be found in some UK-based academic journals such as The Lancet. In the 1960s, this usage was advocated by the School Mathematics Project, and continues to be used, albeit inconsistently, in primary-school mathematics education. When the pound sterling was decimalised in 1971, the official advice issued was to write decimal amounts with a raised point (for example, £21·48) and to use a decimal point "on the line" only when typesetting constraints made it unavoidable. However, this usage had already been declining since the 1968 ruling by the Ministry of Technology to use the full stop as the decimal point, not only because of that ruling but also because the standard UK keyboard layout (for typewriters and computers) has only the full stop.

In the artificially constructed Shavian alphabet, mid points are used instead of capitalization as the marker of proper nouns. The dot is placed at the beginning of a word.

=== Latin ===
The interpunctum was regularly used in classical Latin to separate words. (Note: interpunctum seems to be Latin for "punctuated", not the interpunct. See https://www.online-latin-dictionary.com/latin-english-dictionary.php?parola=interpunctus. Wingo (sporadically) uses the terms "interpunctum" and interpucta, but does not indicate that they are non-English terms. However, some of the people he quotes do italicize "interpuncta", while apparently referring to interpuncts, probably to indicate that the word is (New?) Latin. See also https://www.online-latin-dictionary.com/latin-english-dictionary.php?parola=interpuncta, which claims interpuncta is a plural noun meaning "breaks, punctuation") In addition to the most common round form, inscriptions sometimes use a small equilateral triangle for the interpunctum, pointing either up or down. It may also appear as a mid-line comma, similar to the Greek practice of the time. The interpunctum fell out of use c. 200 CE and Latin was then written scripta continua for several centuries.

=== Franco-Provençal ===
In Franco-Provençal (or Arpitan), the middle dot is used in order to distinguish between the following graphemes:

- ch·, pronounced [ʃ], versus ch, pronounced [ts]
- j·, pronounced [ʒ], versus j, pronounced [dz]
- g· before e, i, pronounced [ʒ], versus g before e, i, pronounced [dz]

=== French ===
In modern French, the middle dot is sometimes used for gender-neutral writing, as in les salarié·e·s for les salariés et les salariées ("the male employees and the female employees").

=== Occitano-Romance ===
==== Catalan ====
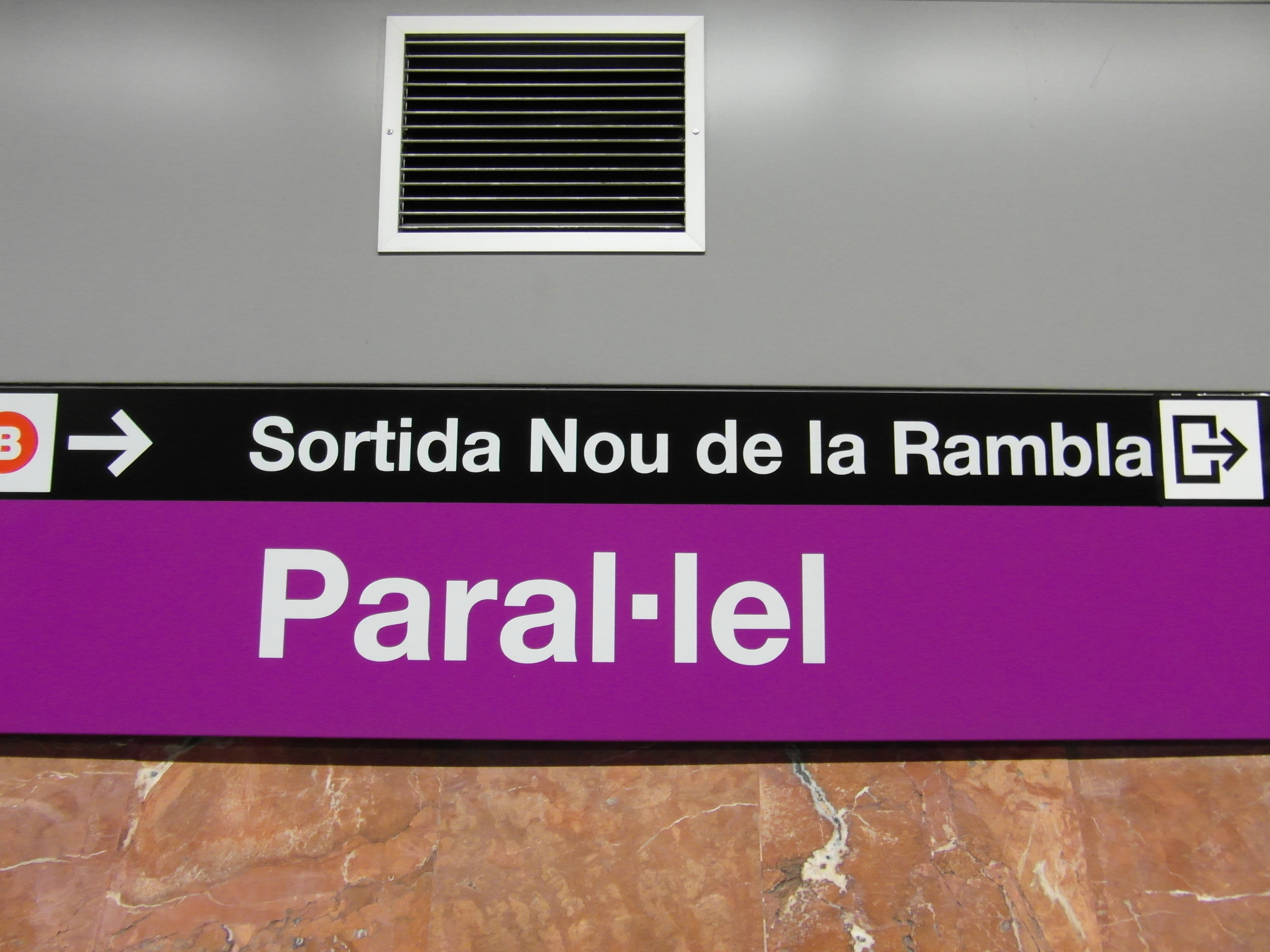
Metro station Paral·lel in Barcelona

The punt volat ("flying point") is used in Catalan between two Ls in cases where each belongs to a separate syllable, for example cel·la, "cell". This distinguishes such "geminate Ls" (ela geminada), which are pronounced [ɫː], from "double L" (doble ela), which are written without the flying point and are pronounced [ʎ]. In situations where the flying point is unavailable, periods (as in col.lecció) or hyphens (as in col-lecció) are frequently used as substitutes, but this is tolerated rather than encouraged.

Historically, medieval Catalan also used the symbol · as a marker for certain elisions, much like the modern apostrophe (see Occitan below) and hyphenations.

There is no separate physical keyboard layout for Catalan: the flying point can be typed using ⇧ Shift+3 in the Spanish (Spain) layout or with Option +⇧ Shift+9 on a US English layout. On a mobile phone with a Catalan keyboard layout, the geminate L with a flying dot appears when holding down the L key. It appears in Unicode as the precomposed letters Ŀ (U+013F) and ŀ (U+0140), but they are compatibility characters and are not frequently used or recommended. (Note: The preferred Unicode representation is a succession of three characters, that is: ⟨L·L⟩ (U+004C + U+00B7 + U+004C) and ⟨l·l⟩ (U+006C + U+00B7 + U+006C).)

==== Gascon ====
In Gascon, the middle dot (punt interior, literally, "inner dot", or ponch naut for "high / upper point") is used to distinguish the following graphemes:

- s·h, pronounced [s.h], versus sh, pronounced [ʃ], for example, in des·har 'to undo' vs deishar 'to leave'
- n·h, pronounced [n.h], versus nh, pronounced [ɲ], for example in in·hèrn 'hell' vs vinha 'vineyard'

Although it is considered to be a spelling error, a period is frequently used when a middle dot is unavailable: des.har, in.hèrn, which is the case for French keyboard layout.

In modern editions of Old Occitan texts, the apostrophe and middle dot are used to denote certain elisions that were not originally marked. The apostrophe is used with proclitic forms and the middle dot is used with enclitic forms:

- que·l (que lo, that the) versus qu'el (that he)
- From Bertran de Born's Ab joi mou lo vers e·l comens (translated by James H. Donalson):

Bela Domna·l vostre cors gens
E·lh vostre bel olh m'an conquis,
E·l doutz esgartz e lo clars vis,
E·l vostre bels essenhamens,
Que, can be m'en pren esmansa,
De beutat no·us trob egansa:
La genser etz c'om posc'e·l mon chauzir,
O no·i vei clar dels olhs ab que·us remir.

Domna·l [ˈdonnal] = Domna, lo ("Lady, the": singular definite article)
E·lh [eʎ] = E li ("And the": plural definite article)
E·l [el] = E lo ("And the")
E·l = E lo ("And the")

No·us [nows] = Non vos ("(do) not... you": direct object pronoun)
E·l = En lo ("in the")
No·i [noj] = Non i ("(do) not... there") // Que·us [kews] = Que vos ("that (I)... you")

O pretty lady, all your grace
and eyes of beauty conquered me,
sweet glance and brightness of your face
and all your nature has to tell
so if I make an appraisal
I find no one like in beauty:
most pleasing to be found in all the world
or else the eyes I see you with have dimmed.

=== Greek ===
Ancient Greek lacked word spacing or middle dots but instead ran all the letters together. By Late Antiquity, various marks were used to separate words, including "a high dot (stigme teleia, "final dot") corresponding to our full stop; a low dot (hypostigme, "underdot") corresponding to our semicolon; a middle dot (stigme mese, 'middle dot') corresponding to our comma". The Hellenistic scholars of Alexandria created these marks as part of "the earliest official system of punctuation, devised [in] the 3rd century BC." It later fell out of use.

In modern Greek, the ano teleia mark (Greek: άνω τελεία, romanized: ánō teleía, lit. 'upper stop'; also known as άνω στιγμή, áno stigmí) is the infrequently-encountered Greek semicolon and is properly romanized as such. In Greek text, Unicode provides the code point U+0387 · GREEK ANO TELEIA; however, it is canonically equivalent to U+00B7 · MIDDLE DOT. On this matter, the Unicode core specification says:

Two specific modern Greek punctuation marks are encoded in the Greek and Coptic block: U+037E ";" GREEK QUESTION MARK and U+0387 "·" GREEK ANO TELEIA. The Greek question mark (or erotimatiko) has the shape of a semicolon, but functions as a question mark in the Greek script. The ano teleia has the shape of a middle dot, but functions as a semicolon in the Greek script.

These two compatibility punctuation characters have canonical equivalences to U+003B ; SEMICOLON and U+00B7 · MIDDLE DOT, respectively; as a result, normalized Greek text will lose any distinctions between the Greek compatibility punctuation characters and the common punctuation marks. Furthermore, ISO/IEC 8859-7 and most vendor code pages for Greek simply make use of semicolon and middle dot for the punctuation in question. Therefore, use of U+037E and U+0387 is not necessary for interoperating with legacy Greek data, and their use is not generally encouraged for representation of Greek punctuation.

=== Old Irish ===
In many linguistic works discussing Old Irish (but not in actual Old Irish manuscripts), the middle dot is used to separate a pretonic preverbal element from the stressed syllable of the verb, e.g. do·beir "gives". It is also used in citing the verb forms used after such preverbal elements (the prototonic forms), e.g. ·beir "carries", to distinguish them from forms used without preverbs, e.g. beirid "carries". In other works, the hyphen (do-beir, -beir) or colon (do:beir, :beir) may be used for this purpose.

=== Ethiopic ===
The Geʽez (Ethiopic) script traditionally separates words with a grapheme of two vertically aligned dots, like a colon, but with larger dots: U+1361 ፡ ETHIOPIC WORDSPACE. (For example ገድለ፡ወለተ፡ጴጥሮስ). Starting in the late 19th century the use of such punctuation has largely fallen out of use in favor of whitespace, except in formal hand-written or liturgical texts. In Eritrea the character may be used as a comma.

=== Tibetan ===
In Tibetan the middle dot, called tsek (ཙེག་), is used as a morpheme delimiter. U+0F0B ་ TIBETAN MARK INTERSYLLABIC TSHEG

=== Chinese ===
The middle dot or "partition sign" is used in Chinese (which generally lacks spacing between characters) to mark divisions in words transliterated from phonogram languages, particularly names. Some fonts and software render U+00B7 · MIDDLE DOT as double-width if it is between double-width characters, China's standards recommend half-width between Arabic numerals. In Taiwan, the formal standard, as defined by CNS 11643, historically specified U+2027 ‧ HYPHENATION POINT, while U+30FB ・ KATAKANA MIDDLE DOT should be primarily used in Japanese contexts for separating katakana words. When the Chinese text is romanized, the partition sign is simply replaced by a standard space or other appropriate punctuation. Thus, William Shakespeare is written as 威廉·莎士比亚 (威廉·莎士比亞; Wēilián Shāshìbǐyà) and George W. Bush as 乔治·W. 布什 (喬治·W. 布什; Qiáozhì W. Bùshí). Titles and other translated words are not similarly marked: Genghis Khan and Elizabeth II are simply 成吉思汗 (Chéngjísī hán) and 伊丽莎白二世 (伊麗莎白二世; Yīlìshābái èrshì).

The partition sign is also used to separate book and chapter titles when they are mentioned consecutively: book first and then chapter.

=== Hokkien ===
In Pe̍h-ōe-jī for Taiwanese Hokkien, middle dot is often used as a workaround for the dot above right diacritic, since most early encoding systems did not support this diacritic. This is now encoded as U+0358 ◌͘ COMBINING DOT ABOVE RIGHT (see o͘). Unicode did not support this diacritic until June 2005. Newer fonts often support it natively; however, the practice of using middle dot still exists. Historically, it was derived in the late 19th century from an older barred-o with curly tail as an adaptation to the typewriter.

=== Japanese ===
Middle dots are often used to separate transcribed foreign names or words written in katakana. For example, "Beautiful Sunday" becomes ビューティフル・サンデー (Byūtifuru·Sandē). A middle dot is also sometimes used to separate lists in Japanese instead of the Japanese comma. Dictionaries and grammar lessons in Japanese sometimes also use a similar symbol to separate a verb suffix from its root. While some fonts may render the Japanese middle dot as a square under great magnification, this is not a defining property of the middle dot that is used in China or Japan.

However, the Japanese writing system usually does not use space or punctuation to separate words (though the mixing of katakana, kanji and hiragana gives some indication of word boundary).

In Japanese typography, there exist two Unicode code points:

- U+30FB ・ KATAKANA MIDDLE DOT, with a fixed width that is the same as most kana characters, known as fullwidth.
- U+FF65 ･ HALFWIDTH KATAKANA MIDDLE DOT

The middle dot also has a number of other uses in Japanese, including the following: to separate titles, names and positions: 課長補佐・鈴木 (Assistant Section Head · Suzuki); as a decimal point when writing numbers in kanji: 三・一四一五九二 (3.141 592); as a slash when writing for "or" in abbreviations: 月・水・金曜日 (Mon/Wed/Friday); in place of hyphens, dashes and colons when writing vertically; and in song lyrics to add a brief pause between syllables.

=== Korean ===
Middle dots are used in written Korean to denote a list of two or more words, similarly to how a slash (/) is used to juxtapose words in many other languages. In this role it also functions in a similar way to the English en dash, as in 미·소관계, "American–Soviet relations". The use of middle dots has declined in years of digital typography and especially being replaced informally by slashes but, in the strictest sense, a slash cannot replace a middle dot in Korean typography.

U+318D ㆍ HANGUL LETTER ARAEA (아래아) is used more than the Unicode middle dot when a mid-line dot is to be used in Korean typography – though araea is technically not a punctuation symbol but actually an obsolete Hangu jamo. Because araea is a full-width letter, it looks better than middle dot between Hangul. Araea is drawn like the middle dot in Windows default Korean fonts such as Batang.

=== Runes ===
Runic texts use a punctuation mark like either a middle dot or a colon, to separate words. There are two Unicode characters dedicated for this:

- U+16EB ᛫ RUNIC SINGLE PUNCTUATION
- U+16EC ᛬ RUNIC MULTIPLE PUNCTUATION

== In mathematics and science ==
⋅o

Multiplication dot
- In Unicode: U+22C5 ⋅ DOT OPERATOR (&sdot;)

Related
- See also: U+2219 ∙ BULLET OPERATOR; U+00D7 × MULTIPLICATION SIGN (&times;)

Up to the mid twentieth century, and sporadically even much later, the middle dot could be found used as the decimal point in British publications, such as tables of constants (e.g., "π = 3·14159").

In publications conforming to the standards of the International System of Units, as well as the multiplication sign (×), the centered dot (dot operator) can be used as a multiplication sign. Only a comma or full stop (period) may be used as a decimal marker. The centered dot can be used when multiplying units, as in m·kg·s^{−2} for the newton expressed in terms of SI base units. In the United States, the use of a centered dot for the multiplication of numbers or values of quantities is discouraged by NIST.

In mathematics, a small middle dot can be used to represent multiplication; for example, $x\cdot y$ for multiplying $x$ by $y$. When dealing with scalars, it is interchangeable with the multiplication sign (×), as long as the multiplication sign is between numerals such that it would not be mistaken as variable $x$. For instance, $2\cdot3y$ means the same thing as $2\times3y$. However, when dealing with vectors, the dot operator denotes a dot product (e.g. $\vec{x}\cdot\vec{y}$, a scalar), which is distinct from the cross product (e.g. $\vec{x}\times\vec{y}$, a vector).

The symbol is sometimes used to denote the "AND" relationship in formal logic and Boolean algebra, which can be seen as a special case of multiplication.

Another usage of this symbol in mathematics is with functions, where the dot is used as a placeholder for a function argument, in order to distinguish between the (general form of the) function itself and the value or a specific form of a function evaluated at a given point or with given specifications. For example, $f(\cdot)$ denotes the function $x\mapsto f(x)$, and $\theta(s,a,\cdot)$ denotes a partial application, where the first two arguments are given and the third argument shall take any valid value on its domain.

In computing, the middle dot is usually displayed (but not printed) to indicate white space in various software applications such as word processing, graphic design, web layout, desktop publishing or software development programs. In some word processors, middle dots are used to denote not only hard space or space characters, but also sometimes used to indicate a space when put in paragraph format to show indentations and spaces. This allows the user to see where white space is located in the document and what sizes of white space are used, since normally white space is invisible so tabs, spaces, non-breaking spaces and such are indistinguishable from one another.

In chemistry, the middle dot is used to separate the parts of formulas of addition compounds, mixture salts or solvates (typically hydrates), such as of copper(II) sulfate pentahydrate, CuSO_{4}·5H_{2}O. The middle dot should not be surrounded by spaces when indicating a chemical adduct.

== The middot as a letter ==
A middot may be used as a consonant or modifier letter, rather than as punctuation, in transcription systems and in language orthographies. For such uses Unicode provides the code point U+A78F ꞏ LATIN LETTER SINOLOGICAL DOT.

In Americanist phonetic notation, the middot is a more common variant of the colon ⟨꞉⟩ used to indicate vowel length. It may be called a half-colon in such usage. Graphically, it may be high in the letter space (the top dot of the colon) or centered as the middle dot. From Americanist notation, it has been adopted into the orthographies of several languages, such as Washo.

In the writings of Franz Boas, the middot was used for palatal or palatalized consonants, e.g. ⟨kꞏ⟩ for IPA [c].

In the Sinological tradition of the 36 initials, the onset 影 (typically reconstructed as a glottal stop) may be transliterated with a middot ⟨ꞏ⟩, and the onset 喻 (typically reconstructed as a null onset) with an apostrophe ⟨ʼ⟩. Conventions vary, however, and it is common for 影 to be transliterated with the apostrophe. These conventions are used both for Chinese itself and for other scripts of China, such as ʼPhags-pa and Jurchen.

In the Canadian Aboriginal syllabics, a middle dot ⟨ᐧ⟩ indicates a syllable medial ⟨w⟩ in Cree and Ojibwe, ⟨y⟩ or ⟨yu⟩ in some of the Athapascan languages, and a syllable medial ⟨s⟩ in Blackfoot. However, depending on the writing tradition, the middle dot may appear after the syllable it modifies (which is found in the Western style) or before the syllable it modifies (which is found in the Northern and Eastern styles). In Unicode, the middle dot is encoded both as independent glyph U+1427 ᐧ CANADIAN SYLLABICS FINAL MIDDLE DOT or as part of a pre-composed letter, such as in U+143C ᐼ CANADIAN SYLLABICS PWI. In the Carrier syllabics subset, the middle dot Final indicates a glottal stop, but a centered dot diacritic on [ə]-position letters transform the vowel value to [i], for example: U+1650 ᙐ CANADIAN SYLLABICS CARRIER SE, U+1652 ᙒ CANADIAN SYLLABICS CARRIER SI.

== Similar symbols ==
Symbol	Character Entity	Numeric Entity	Unicode Code Point	LaTeX	Notes
·	&middot; &centerdot; &CenterDot;	&#183;	U+00B7 middle dot	\textperiodcentered	The middle dot
ˑ		&#721;	U+02D1 modifier letter half triangular colon		IPA middle dot symbol: the triangular middot.
·		&#903;	U+0387 greek ano teleia		Greek ánō stigmē
ּ		&#1468;	U+05BC hebrew point dagesh or mappiq		Hebrew point dagesh or mapiq
᛫		&#5867;	U+16EB runic single punctuation		Runic punctuation
•	&bull;	&#8226;	U+2022 bullet	\textbullet	bullet, often used to mark list items
‧		&#8231;	U+2027 hyphenation point		hyphenation point (dictionaries)
∘	&compfn;	&#8728;	U+2218 ring operator	\circ	ring operator (mathematics)
∙		&#8729;	U+2219 bullet operator	\bullet	bullet operator (mathematics)
⋅	&sdot;	&#8901;	U+22C5 dot operator	\cdot, \cdotp	dot operator (mathematics)
⏺		&#9210;	U+23FA black circle for record		black circle for record
●		&#9679;	U+25CF black circle		
◦		&#9702;	U+25E6 white bullet		hollow bullet
⚫		&#9899;	U+26AB medium circle black		medium black circle
⦁		&#10625;	U+2981 z notation spot		symbol used by the Z notation
⸰		&#11824;	U+2E30 ring point		Avestan punctuation mark
⸱		&#11825;	U+2E31 word separator middle dot		word separator (Avestan and other scripts)
⸳		&#11827;	U+2E33 raised dot		vertical position between full stop and middle dot
・		&#12539;	U+30FB katakana middle dot		fullwidth katakana middle dot
ꞏ		&#42895;	U+A78F latin letter sinological dot		as a letter
･		&#65381;	U+FF65 halfwidth katakana middle dot		halfwidth katakana middle dot
𐄁		&#65793;	U+10101 aegean word separator dot		word separator for Aegean scripts (Linear A and Linear B)

Characters in the Symbol column above may not render correctly in all browsers.

== See also ==
- Dot (disambiguation)
- Punctuation
- Syllabification
