= Elihu Doty =

American missionary (1809–1864)

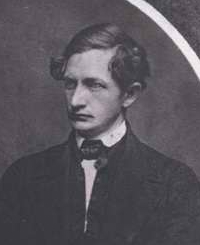
- Missionary and linguist
- Born: September 20, 1809; Berne, New York, US
- Died: November 20, 1864 (aged 55) at sea, en route to New York
- Resting place: Parsippany, New Jersey
- Education: Rutgers College; New Brunswick Theological Seminary
- Occupation: Missionary
- Years active: 1836–1864
- Known for: Anglo Chinese Manual of the Amoy Dialect
- Spouses: Clarissa D. Ackley; Eleanor Augusta Smith Doty

Elihu Doty (20 September 1809 – 30 November 1864) was an American missionary to China. He was responsible for the first textbook of Southern Min in English. Along with John Van Nest Talmage he is credited with the invention of Pe̍h-ōe-jī, the most common orthography used to write Southern Min, although some doubt remains as to the exact origins of this system.

== Early mission ==
Doty arrived in Batavia (now Jakarta) in the Dutch East Indies in 1836 and spent his first three years as a missionary there; Azubah Caroline Condit was among those who accompanied him on his journey there. His next station was Borneo, from 1839 to 1844, at which point he relocated to Amoy (now Xiamen) in Fujian, China.

== Mission in Amoy ==
It was while stationed in Amoy that Doty produced the Anglo Chinese Manual of the Amoy Dialect (1853), which was "the earliest existing textbook for a Southern Min dialect".

== Publications ==
- Doty, Elihu (1850). Some thoughts on the proper term to be employed to translate Elohim and Theos into Chinese. Shanghae: Mission Press. OCLC 31245161.
- Doty, Elihu (1853). Anglo Chinese Manual of the Amoy Dialect. Guangzhou: Samuel Wells Williams. OCLC 20605114.
