= Ernest Tipson =

Ernest Tipson (1883–1958) was an English Plymouth Brethren missionary and linguist who compiled dictionaries of Cantonese and Hokkien (Amoy dialect).

== Early life ==
Born into a large Brethren family in Enfield (then part of the Edmonton Hundred of Middlesex), England, Tipson began his working life, at the age of 14, as an architect's clerk and typist, but was called to missionary service in the early 1900s.

== Missionary work ==
Tipson's first posting was to Penang and he sailed there from England in November 1908. In October 1909, he traveled to Canton (now Guangzhou) in China where he spent a year mastering the Cantonese dialect. This was to be a vital tool in his missionary work and he went on to acquire the Hokkien dialect.

On his return from Canton (March 1911), Tipson married Agnes Millar in Penang and they settled in Kuala Lumpur. His missionary work involved preaching the Gospel, evangelism, and visiting lepers and prisoners. As with most missionaries, in those times, there was the ever-present danger of ill-health and death due to the heat and humidity of British Malaya. In August 1914, his youngest child, Teddie, then one, fell ill with gastro-enteritis and died. Teddie was namesake of Tipson's 15-year-old brother who had died some 20 years previously.

By 1917, Tipson became seriously ill, and suffered a nervous breakdown, leaving immediately for Sydney, Australia, despite his wife being eight months pregnant. He could not return home to England due to the First World War and finally arrived back in England in December 1918.

After a few years on furlough, Tipson returned to Kuala Lumpur in 1920 and resumed his missionary work. In 1928, he moved to Singapore to take up the post of Secretary to the British and Foreign Bible Society for Malaya.

Nearing retirement, at the age of 58, Tipson was incarcerated in Changi Prison during the occupation of Singapore by the Japanese during much of World War II. To begin with, he occupied Cell 24, along with Shenton Thomas, the then Governor of Singapore. His ministry in Changi was remarkable in terms of his strength of character and his support for fellow prisoners. Tipson's obituary in the British Association of Malaysia, 1958, read: "There were some gifted preachers in the internment camp (Changi), but no one appealed to the men more than Ernest Tipson."

Tipson's survival, said his son, also Ernest, was probably due to his tremendous sense of humour and the good company and support of son-in-law David. Liberated in 1945, Ernest Senior traveled to India to be reunited with his wife and son. "He was as thin as a stick!", remembered Ernest Junior. "We fell into each other's arms."

After the war, Tipson resumed his work in Singapore briefly. In March 1948, Tipson retired from his British and Foreign Bible Society post and returned to England.

Tipson died in Cornwall during a preaching visit to a local Gospel hall.

== Publications ==
Tipson's linguistic prowess, and later his acknowledged status as a gifted Chinese scholar, was extraordinary in the light of his humble education at a Board School back in England.

His Pocket Dictionary of the Amoy Vernacular is still referenced during the compilation of modern Hokkien/English dictionaries. True to his faith and calling, Tipson is said to have ensured that every word in the Bible found its way into his dictionary. Another of his publications, a Complete Chinese Character Course, was based on lectures he gave in Changi Prison during World War II.

- A Cantonese Syllabary-Index to Soothill’s Pocket Dictionary, incorporating all Cantonese colloquial characters and their meanings. (1917)
- Handbook and vocabulary of the Cantonese New Testament. (1921) (with Roy T. Cowles)
- A Pocket Dictionary of the Amoy Vernacular, English-Chinese. (1934)
- A Pocket Dictionary of the Amoy Vernacular, Chinese-English. (1935)
- Complete Chinese Character Course, etc. (1949)
