= English Presbyterian Mission =

Nineteenth century Presbyterian mission

English Presbyterian Mission was a British Presbyterian missionary society that was involved in sending workers to countries such as China during the late Qing Dynasty.

== English Presbyterian Mission work in China ==
The Presbyterian Church of England resolved to establish a mission in China in 1847. The Rev. William Chalmers Burns went first to Hong Kong and then to Amoy. Ten years later he was joined by the Rev. George Smith. Mr. Burns laid the foundation of what became one of the most extensive and prosperous Christian missions in the Chinese Empire. Its principal centers were Shantou, Amoy, and Taiwan. It had several establishments, combining churches, mission houses, hospitals, and schools, and spent money freely in carrying out every department of operation. The senior missionaries in the field were Rev. H. L. Mackenzie, M.A., of Shantou, and Rev. W. McGregor, M.A., of Amoy. Rev. George Smith, the coadjutor of Mr. Burns, died February 1891. This Society was greatly aided by a women's association, by which female agents were sent out from England. Several of these had certificates for the practice of midwifery, and possessed a general practical knowledge of medicine, being thus able to alleviate the sufferings of the native women to a very considerable degree. In 1890 it had one hundred and six stations in China and Singapore, and employed fifteen ordained missionaries and medical workers. It had nine lady agents, five ordained native pastors, and ninety-three unordained native helpers. It numbered nearly three thousand six hundred members, and had four hundred scholars in its training schools.

== See also ==
- James Laidlaw Maxwell, missionary to Taiwan sent by the Presbyterian Church of England
- Robert Kerr, missionary to Morocco
- Protestant missionary societies in China during the 19th Century
