= John Van Nest Talmage =

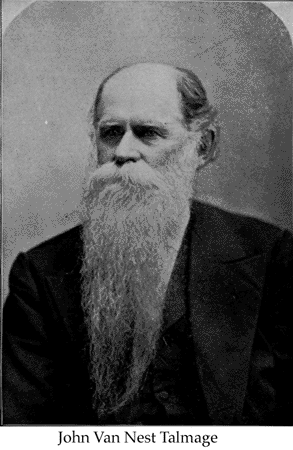
- Missionary to China
- Born: August 18, 1819; Somerville, New Jersey
- Died: August 19, 1892 (aged 73); Bound Brook, New Jersey
- Spouses: (1)Abby F. Woodruff (2)Mary Eliza Van Deventer
- Parent(s): David Talmage; Catharine Van Neste
- Relatives: Thomas De Witt Talmage, brother

John Van Nest Talmage (18 August 1819 – 19 August 1892), was a Protestant Christian missionary to Amoy, Fujian, China. He was sent by the Reformed Church in America from 1847 to 1890.

== Biography ==
His younger brother Thomas De Witt Talmage was also a clergyman, and his family, within the Reformed tradition, migrated to North America from the Netherlands. His father's family had emigrated from England, and were the founders of the towns of South Hampton, and East Hampton in New York.

== Works ==
- Van Nest Talmage, John (1852). Tn̂g-oē Hoan-jī Chho͘-ha̍k. OCLC 66646231: an early book on Pe̍h-oē-jī, the Latin orthography for Southern Min Chinese
- ————— (1885). Chinese-English Dictionary: a dictionary of Amoy vernacular and English
- ————— (1894). New Dictionary in the Amoy Dialect. OCLC 41548900.

He is memorialized in the classic work Forty Years in China, which was written by Rev. John Gerardus Fagg in 1894, a biography genre.
