= Christianity in Taiwan =

臺灣基督教
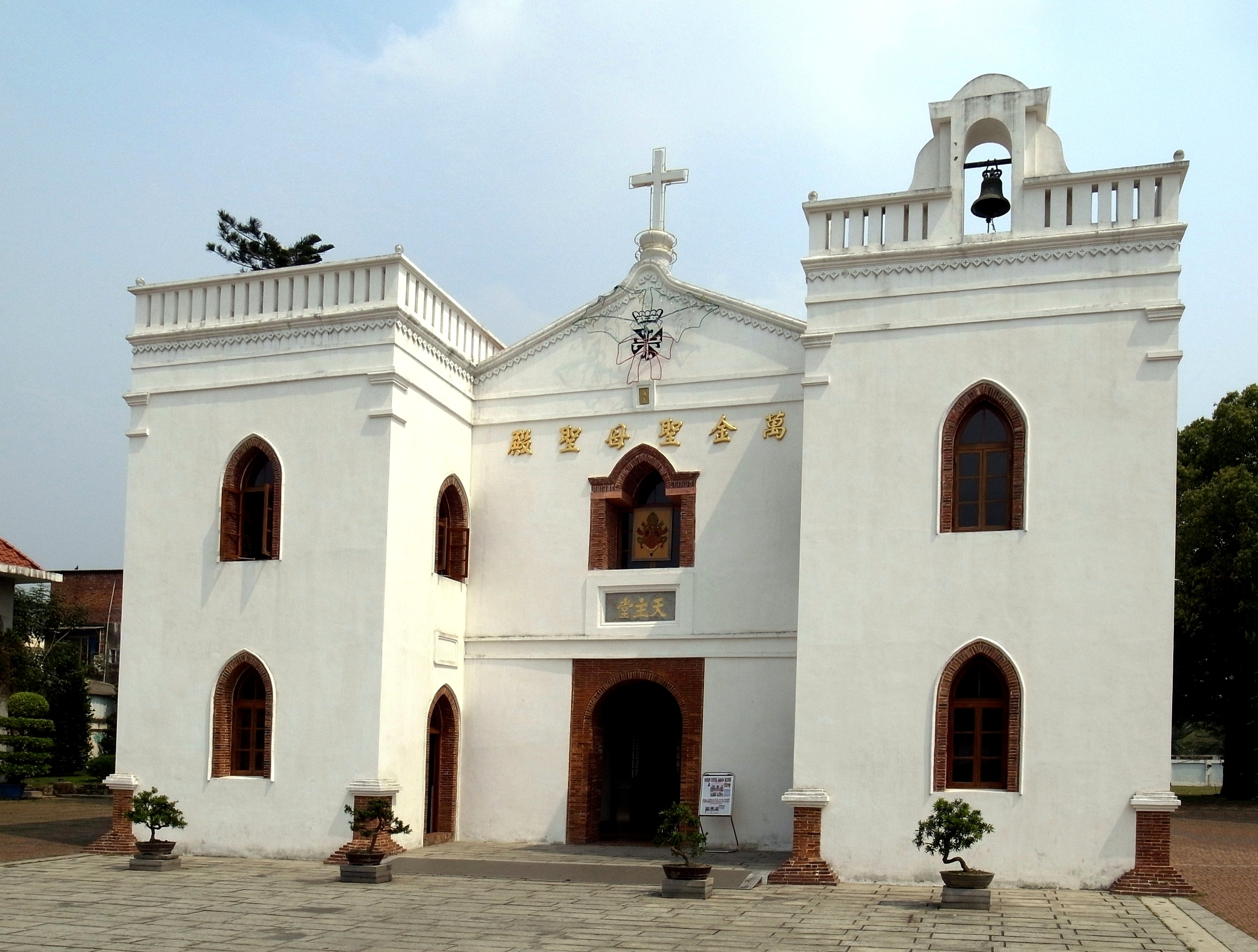
- Catholic Church of Wanchin

Total population
- 7% (Pew Research Center, 2023)

Languages
- Chinese languages (Mandarin, Hokkien, Hakka); Formosan languages, Malayo-Polynesian languages (Tao, Filipino, Indonesian); Japanese, Dutch, Spanish, English

Religion
- Catholicism, Protestantism, Eastern Orthodoxy, Nontrinitarianism

Christianity in Taiwan constituted 7% of the population, according to Taiwan's 2023 census. Christians on the island included approximately 700,000 Protestants and 300,000 Catholics. Christians in Taiwan mostly consist of the Taiwanese indigenous peoples. Due to the small number of practitioners, Christianity has not influenced the island nation's Han Chinese culture in a significant way. A few individual Christians have devoted their lives to charitable work in Taiwan, becoming well known and well liked—for example, George Leslie Mackay (Presbyterian) and Nitobe Inazō (Methodist, later Quaker).

A few presidents of Taiwan have been Christians, including Republic of China's founder Sun Yat-sen (Confucian-Congregationalist), Chiang Kai-shek and his son Chiang Ching-kuo (both Buddhist-Methodists), and Lee Teng-hui (Presbyterian). Ma Ying-jeou apparently received a Catholic baptism in his early teens but does not identify with any religion or with Chinese folk religion practices. At the same time, the Presbyterian Church in Taiwan has been a key supporter of human rights and the Democratic Progressive Party (DPP), a stance opposed to many of the politicians listed as they were a part of the Kuomintang (KMT).

== History ==
Early Protestantism was driven out of Taiwan by the Han Chinese Ming dynasty loyalist Koxinga in 1661, when Koxinga's military forces defeated the European Dutch military forces in Taiwan, effectively leaving no permanent religious influence. The 1860s saw the return of the Spanish Dominicans (via the Philippines), as well as the arrival of Presbyterian missionaries from England and Canada. One particular missionary, George Leslie Mackay, founded the island's first university and hospital.

During the Japanese era (1895–1945), no new missions were allowed, with the result that Catholicism and Presbyterianism remain the largest Christian denominations. The development of Christianity took a whole new turn after 1949, when Christians of various denominations followed the Kuomintang army in its retreat to Taiwan. During the dictatorships of Chiang Kai-shek and his son Chiang Ching-kuo, the Presbyterian Church in Taiwan became outspoken in its defense of democracy, human rights, and a Taiwanese identity. The church is aligned with the Democratic Progressive Party. The number of denominations, and independent churches (often Evangelical or Charismatic), skyrocketed with the political liberalization and economic success of the 1980s.

Today, Taiwanese government statistics estimate that Christians comprise just 7% of Taiwan's population, a figure which is about evenly divided between Catholics and Protestants. Nearly all of Taiwan's aborigines profess Christianity (70% Presbyterianism, the remainder mostly Catholicism).

== Denominations ==
=== Catholicism ===
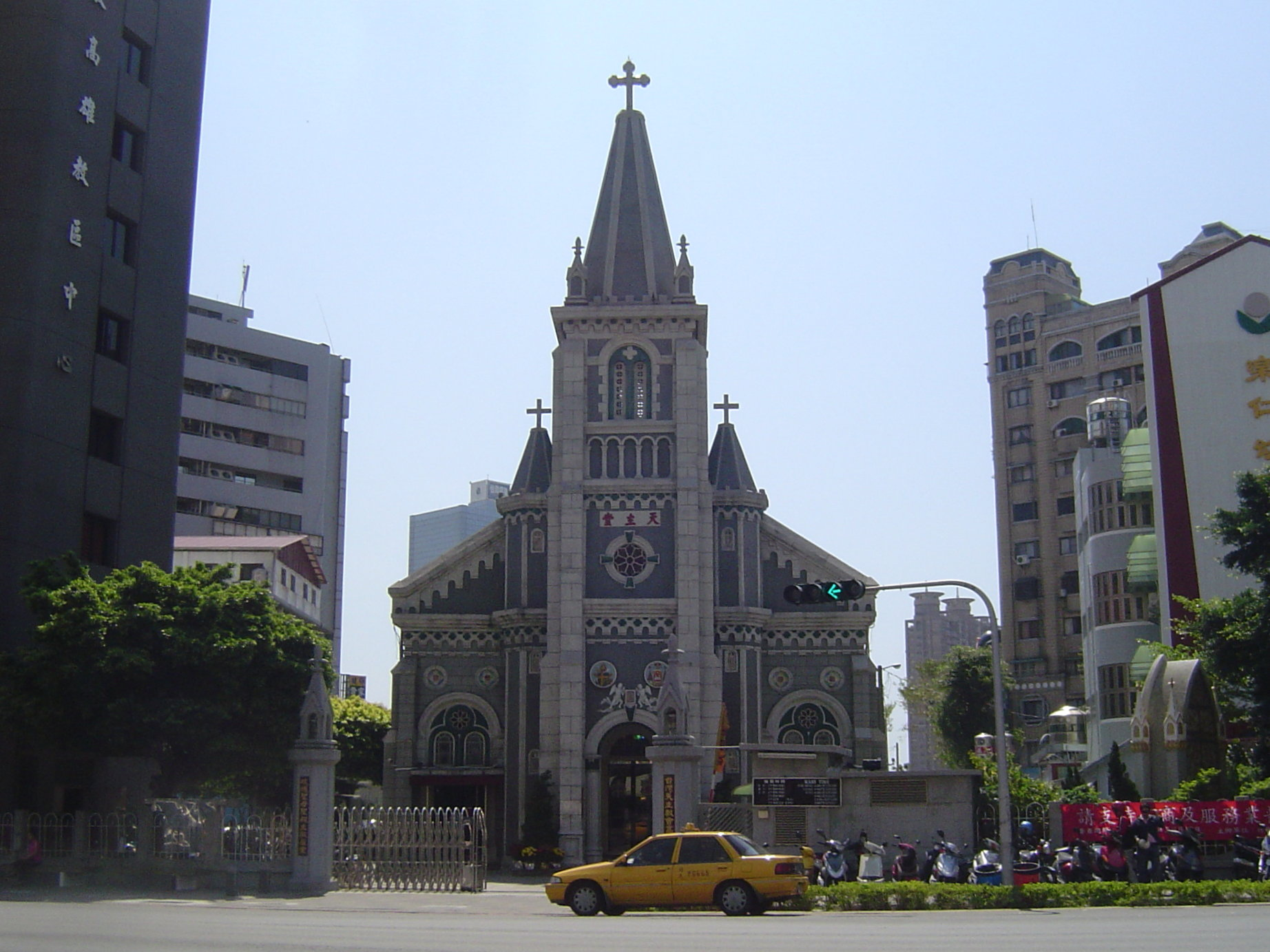
Holy Rosary Cathedral in Kaohsiung

Taiwan has been part of a missionary jurisdiction since 1514, when it was included in the Diocese of Funchal in Portugal. In 1576, the first Chinese diocese was established in Macau, covering most of China proper as well as Taiwan. The diocese was divided several times from the 16th century through the 19th; in chronological order, Taiwan belonged to the dioceses of Nanking (1660), Fukien (1696) and Amoy (1883). In 1913, the Apostolic Vicariate of the Island of Formosa (Taiwan) was established, being detached from the Diocese of Amoy. It was renamed for Kaohsiung in 1949.

Before the end of World War II, the Catholic Church had a very minor presence in Taiwan, based mainly in the south of the island and centered on Spanish Dominican priests who arrived from the Philippines in the 1860s. The following years saw a mass migration of religious communities from mainland China as Communist persecution began to take effect. As a result, the Catholic Church has many Mandarin-speaking postwar mainland immigrants and is under-represented among the native Taiwanese.

In the 1950s and 1960s, many Christian publications on Taiwan condemned Buddhism. A common evangelization strategy was for Christians to go to Buddhist religious sites to challenge Buddhists and distribute Christian literature.

Since 1952, the papal internuncio to China has been stationed in Taiwan, and now constitutes one of the last significant formal diplomatic ties of the Republic of China (Taiwan).

=== Protestantism ===
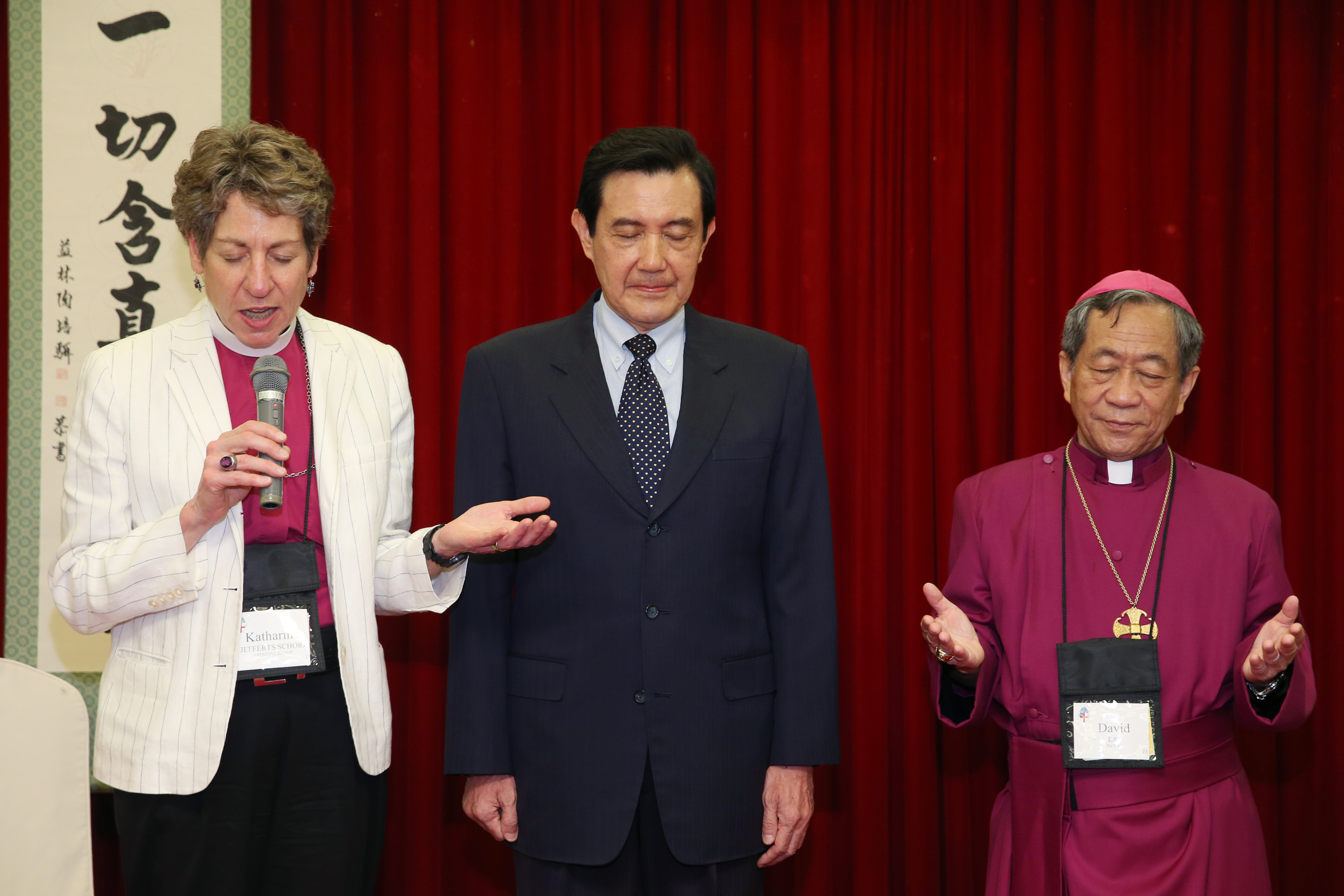
President Ma Ying-jeou attended the opening ceremony for the 2014 Episcopal Church House of Bishops Autumn Meeting celebrating the 60th anniversary of the Taiwan Episcopal Church

A number of denominations (including Baptists, Methodists, Episcopalians, Lutherans, Adventists, and Quakers) arrived on the island nation in the wake of the expulsion of foreign missionaries from China, and the 1949 retreat of Nationalist troops to Taiwan. The same is true of Witness Lee, protégé and co-worker of Watchman Nee, founder of The Local Churches or Church Assembly Hall movement.

The Chinese Baptist Convention and its predecessors had been planning a Taiwan mission since 1936; its first missionary arrived in 1948. Activity swelled in the 1950s. Baptist churches being congregationally governed, the CBC is not so much a denomination as a cooperative association of independent churches. It supports Taiwan Baptist Theological Seminary (f. 1952).

Taiwan Methodists erected a Taipei church in 1953. The national organization gained autonomy in 1972, and installed its first bishop in 1986.

The Episcopal Diocese of Taiwan (est. 1954) belongs to Province VIII of the U.S. Episcopal Church.

The Taiwan Lutheran Church began meeting in 1951, and received formal recognition in 1954. One of several Lutheran denominations in Taiwan, it claims 18,000 baptized members.

The Adventists founded Taiwan Adventist College in 1951, and Taiwan Adventist Hospital in 1955.

The Taiwan Conservative Baptist Association was founded in 1960.

The Christian and Missionary Alliance arrived in 1963. It now claims a membership of approximately 2,300.

The Fellowship of Mennonite Churches in Taiwan (f. 1962) emerged from medical and relief projects carried out among Taiwan aborigines from 1948 (notably Hualien's Mennonite Christian Hospital, f. 1954). In 2004, it claimed 1,658 adherents, concentrated in three major urban areas.

Taiwan is home to Asia's second largest population of Quakers. In 2017, the Taiwan Yearly Meeting (association) had around 5,000 members.

==== Presbyterianism ====
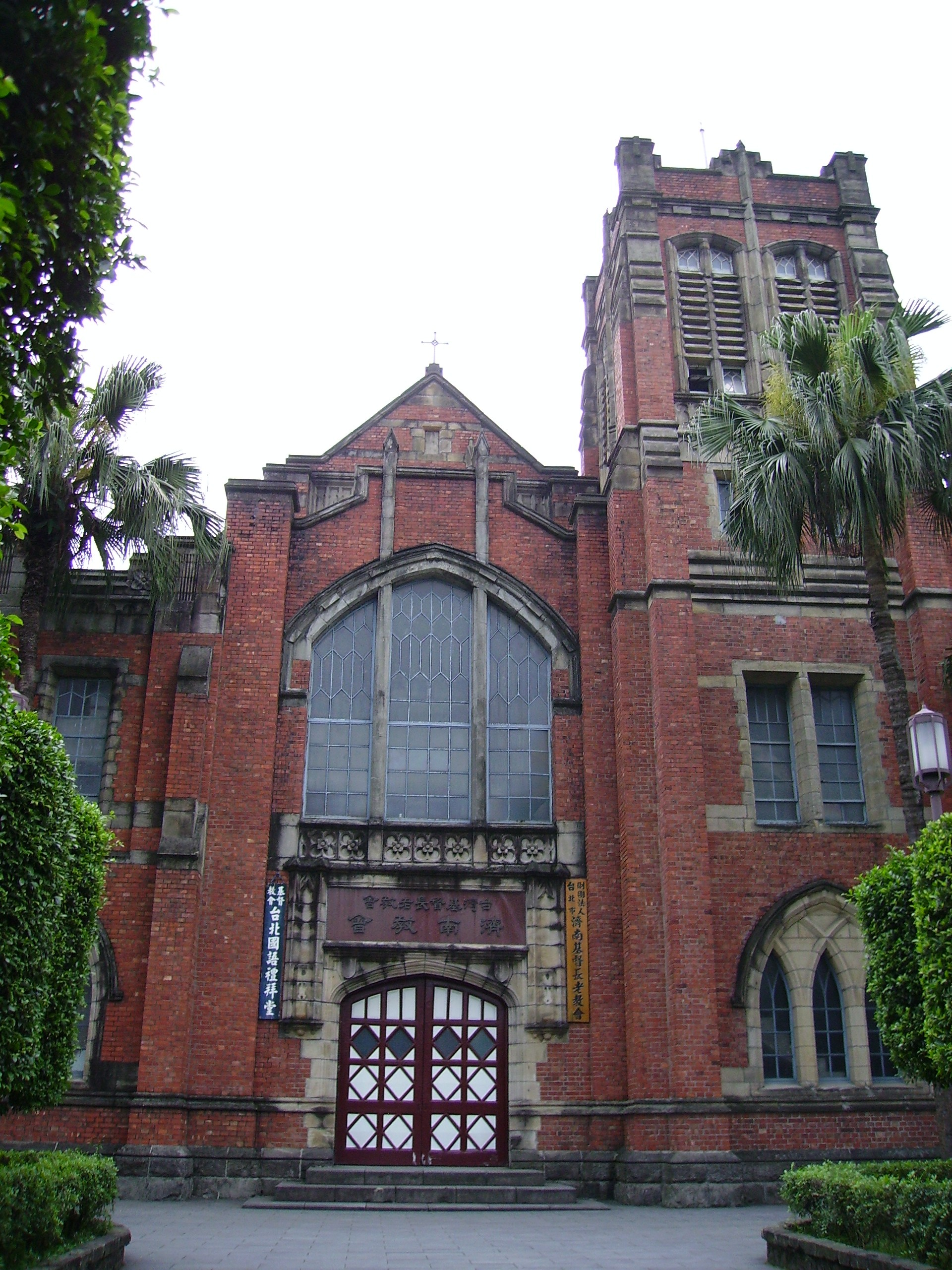
Jinan Church, Presbyterian Church in Taipei

The first Presbyterian mission started in 1865, with the arrival of James Laidlaw Maxwell of the Presbyterian Church of England in Taiwan-fu (Tainan). His colleague George Leslie Mackay of the Presbyterian Church in Canada arrived in 1871, settling in Danshui. Mackay traveled widely throughout the island, and founded numerous churches. He also founded Tamsui Oxford College (now Aletheia University) in 1882, and Mackay Memorial Hospital in 1880. In 1907, Mackay's son-in-law Tan Chemg-gi led the movement to separate from the Northern Synod of the Presbyterian Church of Taiwan, and was elected its first moderator in 1906. In 1912, the Southern Synod, formed by the members of the English Presbyterian Mission in Kaohsiung began meeting with the Northern Synod and together formed the Presbyterian Church of Taiwan (PCT). The PCT doubled its membership between 1955 and 1965, perhaps as a result of its outspoken support for democratization, human rights, and Taiwan independence (against the view of the Kuomintang regime that as a notional province of the Republic of China (Taiwan), democratic elections in Taiwan would have to await the military reconquest of the mainland).

=== Eastern Orthodoxy ===
The history of Eastern Orthodox in Taiwan can be divided into three distinct phases. The first corresponds to the period of Japanese rule (1895–1945), when the first believers arrived on the island from Japan, and petitioned St. Nicholas of Japan to send them a priest. A Taiwan parish, named for Christ the Savior, was created in 1901.

The second period begins in 1949, with the arrival of some 5000 Russian emigres fleeing the Chinese Civil War. A House Church of St. John the Baptist was organized, and visited by various Orthodox dignitaries. At its height, this community numbered one or two hundred believers, and grew inactive during the 1980s. Sources differ as to whether these Russian believers had any contact with their Japanese coreligionists from the earlier period.

The third period begins in 2000, with the arrival of Fr. Jonah (Mourtos) to the island as a missionary priest under the Orthodox Metropolitanate of Hong Kong and Southeast Asia (itself under the Ecumenical Patriarch). Fr. Jonah established Taipei's Holy Trinity Orthodox Church, which formally registered with the government in 2003. Its congregation—a mixture of Russians and East Europeans, as well as Chinese and Western converts—numbers about 30 (rising to more than 100 at Christmas and Easter).

In 2012, the Moscow Patriarchate, apparently in response to petitions from local Russians, "reactivated" the 1901 parish, and established (in Taipei) the Church of the Elevation of the Cross, with Fr. Kirill (Shkarbul) as its first priest. OMHKSEA Bishop Nektarios (Tsilis) of Hong Kong responded by objecting to what he sees as an uncanonical attempt to extend the territory of Moscow beyond its canonical jurisdiction, and by excommunicating Fr. Kirill and a parishioner. (The Moscow-affiliated church did not reciprocate, but in 2018 the Moscow Patriarchate broke ties with the Ecumenical Patriarchate over the issue of Ukrainian autocephaly.)

=== The Church of Jesus Christ of Latter-day Saints ===
The Church of Jesus Christ of Latter-day Saints in Taiwan has approximately 62,100 members with 16 stakes, 98 wards and branches, and 2 missions.

=== Unification Church ===
Moon Sun Myung, founder of the Holy Spirit Association for the Unification of World Christianity, visited Taiwan in 1965. A missionary was sent in 1967. The church received government recognition in 1971, only to be banned in 1975, then finally permitted again in 1990.

=== Jehovah's Witnesses ===
In 2020, the number of Jehovah's Witnesses was 11,379 active publishers, united in 190 congregations; 16,678 people attended annual celebration of Lord's Evening Meal in 2020. In July 2000, Taiwan was the first Asian country to recognise conscientious objection of Jehovah's Witnesses on Military service grounds.

== Educational institutions ==
=== Grade schools ===
- Morrison Academy (f. 1952), non-denominational Protestant
- Dominican International School (f. 1957), Catholic

=== Universities ===
- Aletheia University (f. 1882), Presbyterian
- Soochow University (f. 1951), Methodist
- Fu Jen Catholic University (f. 1952), Catholic / Jesuit
- Chung Yuan Christian University (f. 1953), non-denominational Protestant
- Tunghai University (f. 1955), Methodist
- Providence University (f. 1956), Catholic / Sisters of Providence
- Christ's College (f. 1959), non-denominational Protestant
- St. John's University (f. 1967), originally Episcopalian
- Wenzao Ursuline College of Languages (f. 1966), Catholic / Ursuline
- Chang Jung Christian University (f. 1993), Presbyterian

=== Seminaries ===
- Taiwan Theological College and Seminary (f. 1872/1882), Presbyterian
- Tainan Theological College and Seminary (f. 1876), Presbyterian
- Yu-Shan Theological College and Seminary (formerly Taiwan Bible Institute, f. 1946), Presbyterian
- Taiwan Baptist Theological Seminary (later Taiwan Baptist Christian Seminary, f. 1952)
- Asia Baptist Graduate Theological Seminary (f. 1959)
- China Lutheran Seminary (f. 1966)
- China Evangelical Seminary (1970)
- Central Taiwan Theological College and Seminary
- Taiwan Nazarene Theological College
- Taosheng Theological Seminary
- China Reformed Theological Seminary (f. 1990)
- Holy Light Seminary, Free Methodist
- Taiwan Catholic Regional Seminary (f. 1994, as a union of Pius Seminary, f. 1962, and St. Thomas Major Seminary, f. 1965)
- St. Stanislaus Minor Seminary
- St. Francis Xavier Minor Seminary
- Sacred Heart Minor Seminary
- St. Joseph Minor Seminary
- Taiwan Conservative Baptist Seminary (f. 1957)

== Notable people ==
=== Presidents ===
- Chiang Kai-shek, 1949–1975
- Chiang Ching-kuo, 1978–1988
- Lee Teng-hui, 1988–2000

=== Athletes ===
- Chou Tien-chen, Badminton player

== See also ==
- Religion in Taiwan
