= Huang Chao-hui =

Taiwanese politician

Huang Chao-hui MLY
- 黃昭輝

Member of the Legislative Yuan
- In office 1 February 2005 – 31 January 2008
- Constituency: Kaohsiung 2
- In office 1 February 1993 – 31 January 1996
- Constituency: Kaohsiung 2

Personal details
- Born: 23 September 1946 (age 80) Kaohsiung, Taiwan
- Party: Democratic Progressive Party
- Education: Tainan Theological College and Seminary
- Occupation: politician

Huang Chao-hui (Chinese: 黃昭輝; born 23 September 1946) is a Taiwanese politician who served on the second and sixth convocations of the Legislative Yuan.

== Career ==
Huang attended the Tainan Theological College and Seminary and became an ordained minister of the Presbyterian Church in Taiwan.

He and ten others, including Chang Wen-ying and Kao Chun-ming, were jailed for aiding and abetting Shih Ming-teh, who was attempting to avoid government authorities during the Kaohsiung Incident of 1979. Following his release, Huang managed Lin Li-chen's 1985 bid for a seat on the Kaohsiung City Council. The next year, Huang was charged with libel and assault by a supporter of another candidate. Though the case was dropped, prosecutors chose to bring legal action on grounds of "obstruction of freedom." Still, Huang ran in the 1986 National Assembly elections, and won. In March 1989, Huang was arrested for leading two protests in commemoration of the 228 Incident. In August, the Kaohsiung District Court sentenced Huang to a total of eighteen months imprisonment for his role in the protests. Huang retained his seat on the National Assembly and used his position to protest Kuomintang dominance of the parliamentary body.

Huang ran for a seat on the Legislative Yuan as a representative of Kaohsiung South district in 1992. He led all candidates in vote share for the district and took office in February 1993. During his first term as a member of the Legislative Yuan, Huang was involved in physical altercations with fellow legislators Shih Tai-sheng and Lo Fu-chu. Huang was named a DPP legislative candidate for the second time in 2004, forming an electoral coalition with Tang Chin-chuan, Kuo Wen-chen, and Lo Chih-ming. Huang won approximately 49,000 votes, again placing first in Kaohsiung South. He was critical of how the Ministry of Justice's Investigation Bureau handled leaks relating to the Kaohsiung MRT foreign workers scandal, stating in November 2005 that bureau director Yeh Sheng-mao was "unable to control [his] staff" and that the Executive Yuan could not "control the bureau."

Huang found himself in the midst of a public argument between Shih Ming-teh and Kao Chun-ming in 2006. Kuo called Shih, who was then leading the Million Voices campaign against Chen Shui-bian, greedy, materialistic, and a sellout. After Shih's response, Huang opined that Shih was a "beast," additionally asking him, "How could you say anything bad about your past benefactor? Don't you have a conscience?" Huang and Lin Kuo-ching were charged with slander for calling Shih a "homeless mad dog," a "pervert," and a "bastard." A March 2007 ruling by the Taipei District Court found them guilty, a ruling that was upheld upon appeal in January 2008. Huang ran in the 2008 legislative elections as the Democratic Progressive Party candidate for Kaohsiung's fourth district after refusing to participate in an inter-party primary against Taiwan Solidarity Union candidate Lo Chih-ming, and lost to Lee Fu-hsing.

== Political stances ==
Huang stated in 2005 that he was not opposed to laws regulating Cross-Strait relations, but that councils set up under the purview of such laws could violate the Constitution. In 2007, the government of China announced the establishment of the Friendship Association for Enterprises Invested in by Taiwanese Compatriots, leading to Huang calling for a boycott of the group.

== Personal ==
Huang is married to Chen Ling-li.
