= Kung Fan-pei =

- 孔繁沛
- Born: January 4, 1922; Qufu county, Shandong province, China
- Died: February 5, 2011 (aged 89); Taipei, Taiwan
- Occupation: Christian pastor (Baptist)
- Known for: having served as the chairman of Chinese Baptist Convention and founded a number of Baptist churches in Taiwan

Kung Fan-pei (Chinese: 孔繁沛, January 4, 1922 - February 5, 2011), also known by his (hao), or pen-name, Zhusheng (竹生), meaning "the Bamboo Scholar," was a Baptist pastor in Taiwan. He was born in Qufu, Shandong, China and relocated to Taiwan in 1949 in the aftermath of the Chinese Communist revolution. In Taiwan, he served as the chairman of Chinese Baptist Convention and as the pastor of Keelung Baptist Church and Xiamen Street Baptist Church. He was also the founder of Kindly Light Baptist Church and Youth Park Baptist Church.

== Biography ==
Kung Fan-pei was a 74th-generation descendant of Confucius (not in the main line of descent). He held a degree in fine arts from Ching-Hua Fine Arts Institute (what is today Central Academy of Fine Arts). His wife was Hsu Jui-jung.

During the second Sino-Japanese War, Kung and his wife fled to Jinan and began attending church services before being baptized. After World War II came to an end in 1945, they went back to their hometown, Qufu, where Kung became a fine arts teacher in a local school. Before long, however, they were forced to flee from their hometown again as the Chinese Civil War broke out and the Chinese Communist army took over Shandong. Kung joined the Republic of China Air Force and served as a cartographer in the rank of second lieutenant. Along with the retreating Republic of China Armed Forces, Kung and his wife arrived at Taiwan in 1949.

Having graduated in 1968 from Taiwan Baptist Theological Seminary with a bachelor's degree in theology, Kung became a minister at Keelung Baptist Church.

In 1976, Kung became the pastor at Xiamen Street Baptist church and founded Kindly Light Baptist Church. In 1983, he was elected chairman of Chinese Baptist Convention and conducted an official visit in November to Missouri, United States in his capacity as the chairman of the convention. Before the visit, he gave himself an English name, Paul, in hopes that he could preach the word of Jesus just as Paul the Apostle did.

While he retired in 1994, he remained active in Baptist communities for years to come, until his death in 2011 due to a stroke. In his later years, Kung finally had time for artistic pursuits again, expressing the essence of Christian theology through Chinese ink wash painting.

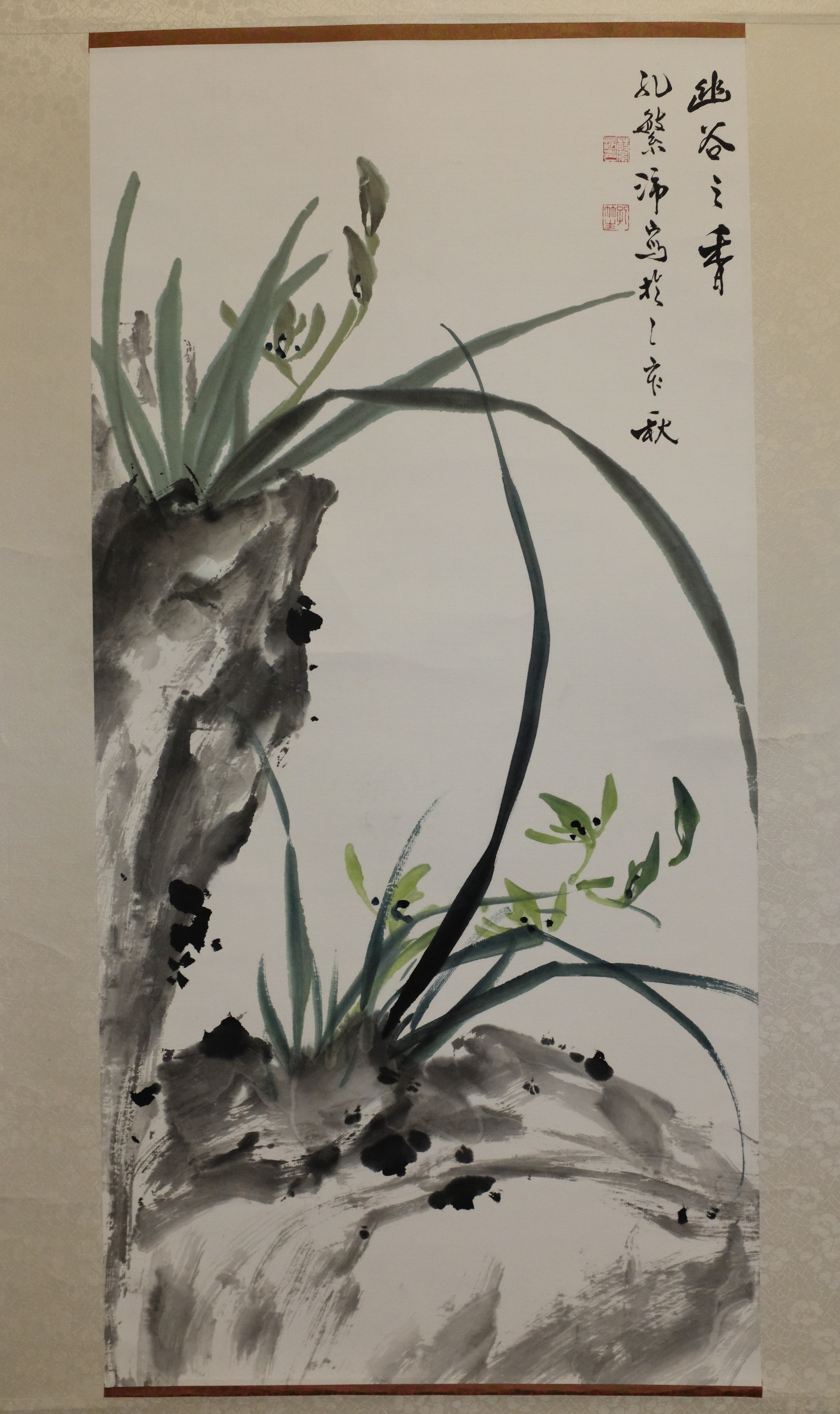
Flowers in the Valley, by Kung Fan-pei

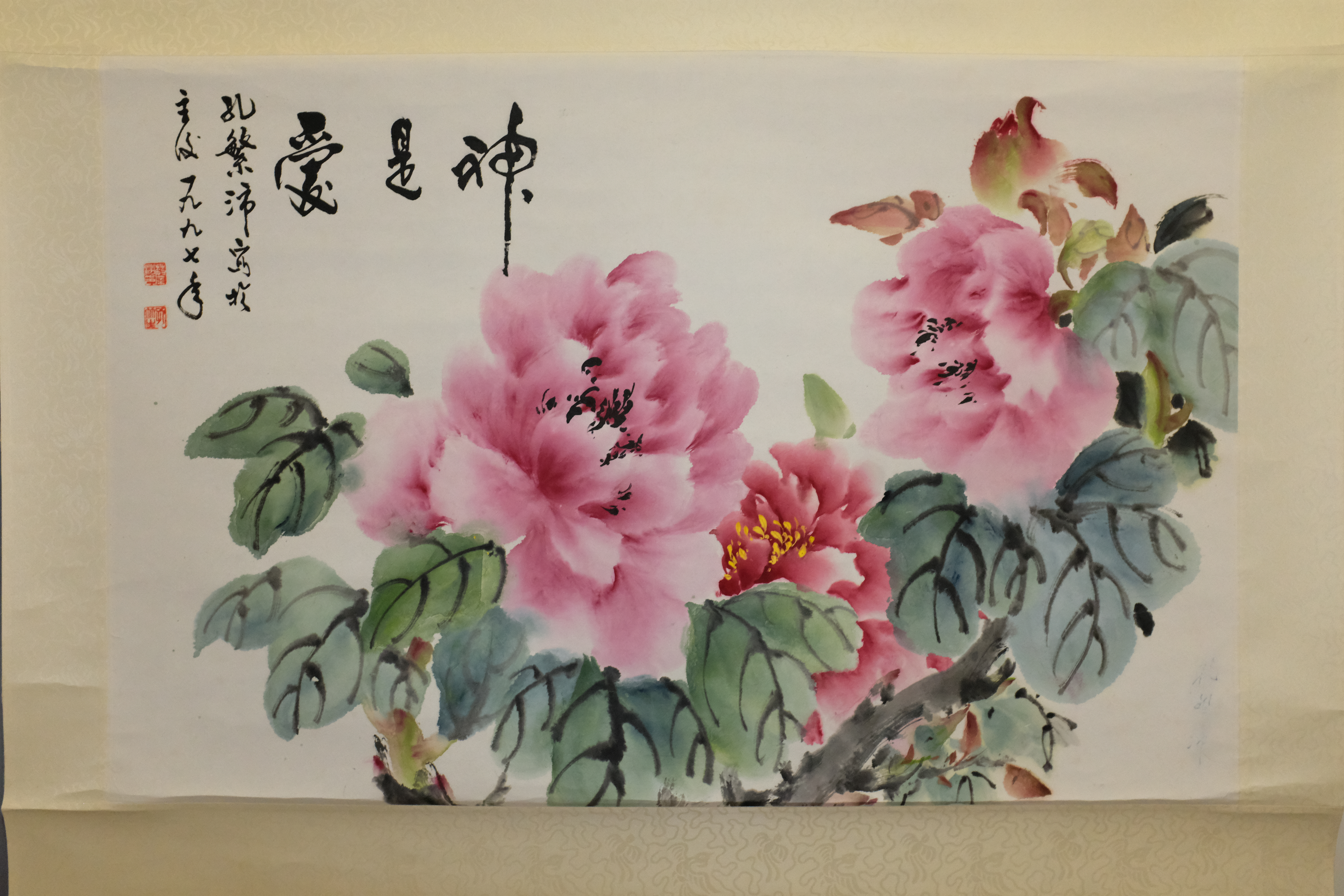
God is Love, by Kung Fan-pei

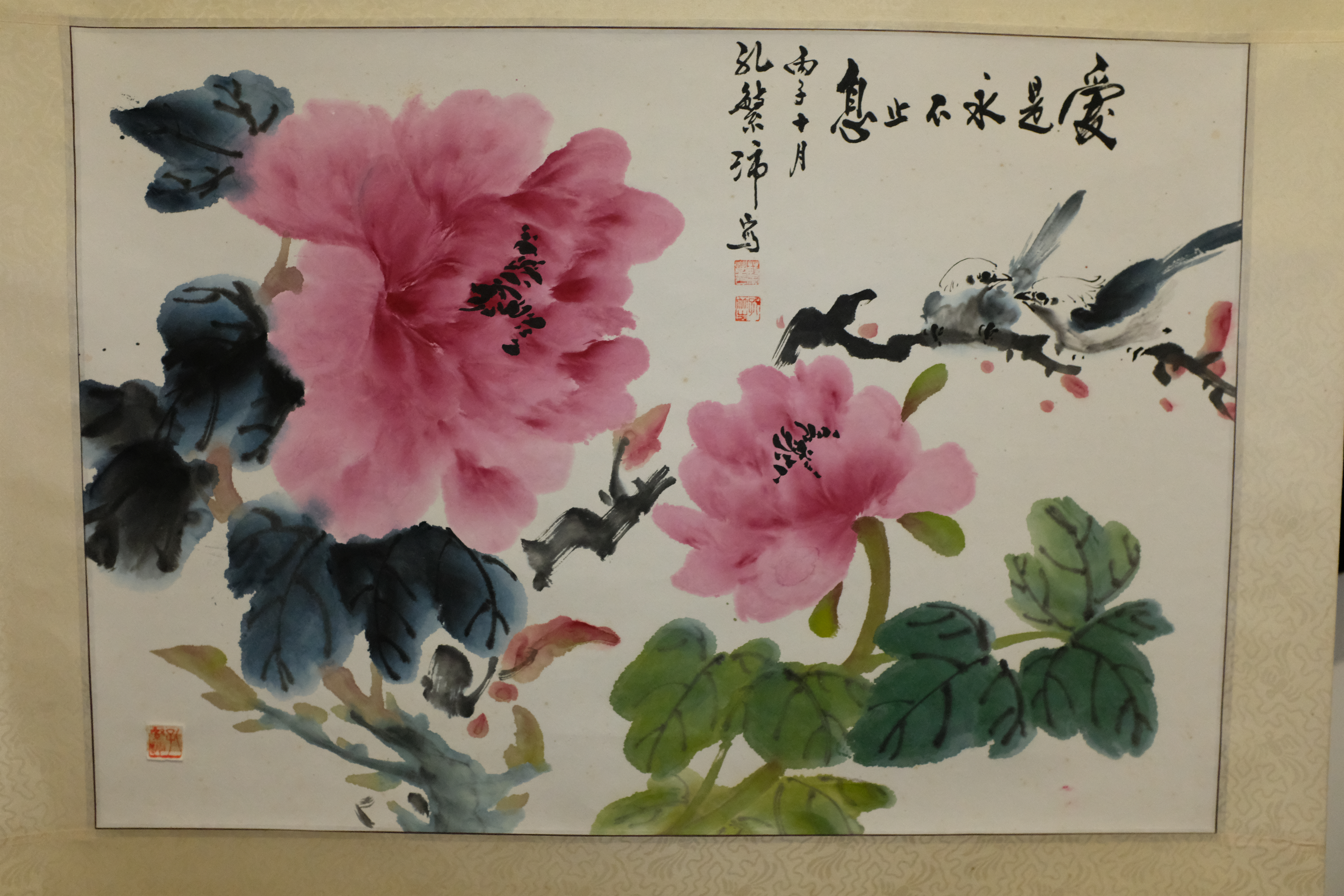
Love Never Fails, by Kung Fan-pei
