= Protestantism in Taiwan =

Protestants in Taiwan constitute a religious minority. According to a 2019 estimate, about 2.6% of Taiwain’s total population (about 600,000 of 23.6 million people) are Protestant. Protestantism was introduced to Taiwan during the Dutch colonial period.

== See also ==
- Christianity in Taiwan
- Presbyterian Church in Taiwan
- Protestantism by country
