= Chow Lien-hwa =

Chinese Baptist minister, missionary, and theologian

Chow Lien-hwa (traditional Chinese: 周聯華; simplified Chinese: 周联华; 7 March 1920 – 6 August 2016) was a Chinese Baptist minister, missionary, and theologian.

He was a recognized Christian leader in Taiwan, serving as chaplain to Taiwan's former presidents Chiang Kai-shek, Chiang Ching-kuo, and Lee Teng-hui.

== Life ==
Chow was born in Shanghai to a Taoist family. He attended the University of Shanghai, but left before graduating in business management due to the Japanese occupation of the city during World War II. Chow settled in Chongqing and enrolled at Chongqing University, where he converted to Baptist Christianity. He returned to Shanghai to complete his degree before going to the United States in 1949 to study theology, completing his BDiv (1951) and PhD (1954) from Southern Baptist Theological Seminary. He would later conduct post-doctoral research at Princeton Theological Seminary and be a visiting scholar at Oxford University.

He was the president of Asia Baptist Graduate Theological Seminary (1993–2005).

Chow died at Cheng Hsin General Hospital on 6 August 2016, aged 96.
