= C. S. Song =

Taiwanese theologian (1929–2024)

Choan-Seng Song (Chinese: 宋泉盛; pinyin: Sòng Quánshèng; Pe̍h-ōe-jī: Sòng Choân-sēng) (October 19, 1929 – November 26, 2024) was a Taiwanese theologian who was Distinguished Professor Emeritus of Theology and Asian Cultures at the Pacific School of Religion.

== Biography ==
Song was born into a Presbyterian family in Tainan, and received his early education while Taiwan was under Japanese rule.

He studied at the National Taiwan University (1950–1954), the University of Edinburgh (1955–1958) and the Union Theological Seminary, where he received his PhD in 1965. Song's dissertation was "The Relation of Divine Revelation and Man's Religion in the Theologies of Karl Barth and Paul Tillich." Song was principal of the Tainan Theological College (1965-70), secretary for Asian ministries of the Reformed Church in America (1970—1973), associate secretary for Faith and Order for the World Council of Churches (1973—1982), and president of the World Alliance of Reformed Churches (1997–2004).

Song received two honorary Doctorate of Divinity degrees, one in 1996 from his alma mater the University of Edinburgh, and another in 2018 from Tainan Theological College where he served as principal.

Song died on November 26, 2024, at the age of 95, after being hospitalized for over a week due to pneumonia.

== Theology ==
A major theme underlying Song's theology was his attack on the Western-centric nature of Christian theology. He saw it as highlighting an individualistic gospel that uproots non-Western converts from their original cultures. Instead, Song argued, God redemptively works in creation through all cultures, even the so-called "non-Christian" cultures. Asian Christians are therefore obliged to articulate an Asian theology, coming from the "womb" of Asia.

Song borrowed his methodology from Latin American liberation theology, which adopts largely from a Marxist critique on religion and capitalism. Song described the people of Asia as being victimized by a history of Western imperialism, both colonially and culturally, creating an identity crisis for Asian Christians. Hence the task of contextualization is found through liberation of these unjust circumstances and the reconstruction of a new identity for Asian Christians.

== Works ==
- "New China and Salvation History: A Methodological Inquiry," in South-East Asia Journal of Theology, 15.2 (1974):52-67.
- Christian Mission in Reconstruction: an Asian Analysis, (New York: Orbis Books, 1975). ISBN 978-0-88344-074-2
- Third-Eye Theology: Theology in Formation in Asian Settings, (New York: Orbis Books, 1979). ISBN 978-0-88344-474-0
- The Compassionate God: An Exercise in the Theology of Transposition, (New York: Orbis Books, 1982). ISBN 978-0-334-01951-0
- Theology from the Womb of Asia, (New York: Orbis Books, 1986). ISBN 978-0-88344-518-1
- Jesus the Crucified People, (Minneapolis: Fortress Press, 1990). ISBN 978-0-8006-2969-4
- Jesus and the Reign of God, (Minneapolis: Fortress Press, 1993). ISBN 978-0-8006-2671-6
- Jesus in the Power of the Spirit, (Minneapolis: Fortress Press, 1994). ISBN 978-1-57910-958-5
- The Believing Heart: An Invitation to Story Theology. Minneapolis: Fortress Press. 1999. ISBN 9780800631420.
- Tracing the Footsteps of God: Discovering What You Really Believe. Minneapolis: Fortress Press. 2007. ISBN 9780800638924.
