= Eastern Orthodoxy in Taiwan =

Type of Christianity in Taiwan

Eastern Orthodoxy in Taiwan represents Christians in Taiwan who are adherents of the Eastern Orthodox Church.

== 1895–1945 ==
Eastern Orthodoxy arrived in Taiwan around 1895, the year the Qing Dynasty ceded the island to Japan. These first Orthodox believers were Japanese immigrants, who almost immediately began petitioning St. Nicholas (Kasatskin), Archbishop of Japan to send them a priest. In 1901, a Tokyo synod created the Christ the Savior Parish in Taiwan. Its first priest was Fr. Simeon (Okava or Yukava—spellings differ), followed (in 1911) by a Fr. Titus (Kariyama). Records indicate a Taiwan-based Orthodox population of 15 or 17 (in 1900), 29 (in 1901), and 44 (in 1903). The activity of the community was interrupted by the 1912 death of St. Nicholas of Japan, and largely ceased with the end of Japanese rule in 1945.

Sayama Dayroku, later Archbishop Nicholas of Ramensky (near Moscow), was born 1914 in Taihoku (Taipei).

== 1949–1970s ==
In 1949, some 5000 Russians arrived from China (e.g. Shanghai, Harbin, Xinjiang) in the wake of the Chinese Civil War, and began gathering in Taipei's Cafe Astoria. Mention is made of a Korean War-era funeral led by Bishop (later Archbishop) John (Shahovskoy) of San Francisco, then a U.S. army chaplain en route from Korea to the USA. Archbishop Ireney (Bekish) of Tokyo (later New York) made annual visits to Taipei between 1957 and 1959, celebrating divine liturgy in a private home, under the name of the Church of the Forerunner. In 1960 he ceded these duties to an American military chaplain, Fr. Nikolay Kirilyuk. 1965 saw a visit by Metropolitan Vladimir (Sagosky) of Japan (later San Francisco), American military chaplain Archpriest Peter Zurnovich, and Fr. Kirill Arihara. The number of Orthodox faithful in Taiwan has been variously estimated at 50 (in 1960), 100 (in 1958), and 200 (in 1965). The Russian community's most famous member, Chiang Ching-kuo's Belarusian-born wife Chiang Fang-liang (née Faina Ipat'evna Vakhreva), did not attend services (and may have nominally affiliated with her husband's Methodism).

Sources differ as to whether this predominantly Russian church had any contact with the earlier wave of Japanese-era believers. By the 1970s the church had again dwindled into inactivity, in part because of a canonical rule requiring the closure of any parish which goes more than fifty years without a resident priest.

== 2000–present ==
But nevertheless, the Taiwanese Orthodox Church was re-established by a Greek hieromonk, Fr. Jonah (Mourtos) of Osiou Gregoriou monastery (Mount Athos) in the year of 2001 AD under the auspices of the Metropolitan of South Asia under the Ecumenical Patriarchate of Constantinople in Istanbul. The attendants are mainly Russian and other Slavic people but gradually, more and more Taiwanese locals are coming to Orthodoxy.

The Holy and Sacred Synod of Constantinople founded also the new Orthodox Metropolitanate of Hong Kong and South East Asia in November 1996, with jurisdiction over: Hong Kong, Macao, China, Taiwan, Mongolia, Philippines, Vietnam, Cambodia, Laos, Thailand, Myanmar, and also Singapore, Indonesia, Malaysia, Brunei, East Timor, Maldives, Sri Lanka, Bangladesh, India, Nepal, Pakistan and Afghanistan.

In 2012, Archbishop Mark of Yegorievsk, the head of the Russian Orthodox Church's Office for Institutions Abroad, reactivated the parish of Christ the Savior in Taipei under the leadership of a Russo-Canadian priest from Canada, Fr. Kirill (Shkarbul). The parish celebrates the services in a mixture of Chinese, English, and Slavonic, with parishioners ranging from Russian, American, to Taiwanese.

== See also ==
- Religion in Taiwan
- Christianity in Taiwan
- Chinese Orthodox Church
- Japanese Orthodox Church
