= Theology from the Womb of Asia =

Book by C. S. Song

- Author: C. S. Song
- Language: United States
- Subject: Christianity in Asia
- Genre: Non-fiction
- Publisher: Orbis Books
- Publication date: 1986
- Media type: Hardcover
- Pages: 241
- ISBN: 9780883445181

Theology from the Womb of Asia is a non-fiction theology book written by Choan Seng Song in 1986 and published in New York. The book examines the nature of Christian theology as interpreted in Asia.

== Description ==
In his book, Song examines the Chinese understanding of Christology in the Incarnation and the Paschal Mystery, which are the foundations of Christian faith. He attempts to expand the horizons of western theology through the use of the thoughts and experiences of people in Asia, and to decrypt the life of Asians in order to see the saving presence of God in their history and culture.

According to Song "if you want to engage in theological decoding these codes, signs, and symbols ... we need to deepen our theological imagination and enhance its power."

Song uses poetry, traditional stories, symbols and rites to show how the peoples of Asia formulate the questions of life as well as socio-political and religious issues. Using these forms of communication, he shows the history of a compassionate God in Jesus. Asian theology is based on the terms of the relationship between God and the suffering of humanity. Using this vision of theology Song leads his readers through the kingdom of God, the Lord's Supper, and the God of mercy. Yeow Choo Lak, writing in a review of Theology from the Womb of Asia, called it "A breath of fresh air to liven up traditional theology," noting Song's use of original reflections and observations of life in close relationships traditional theological.
