= Taiwan Baptist Theological Seminary =

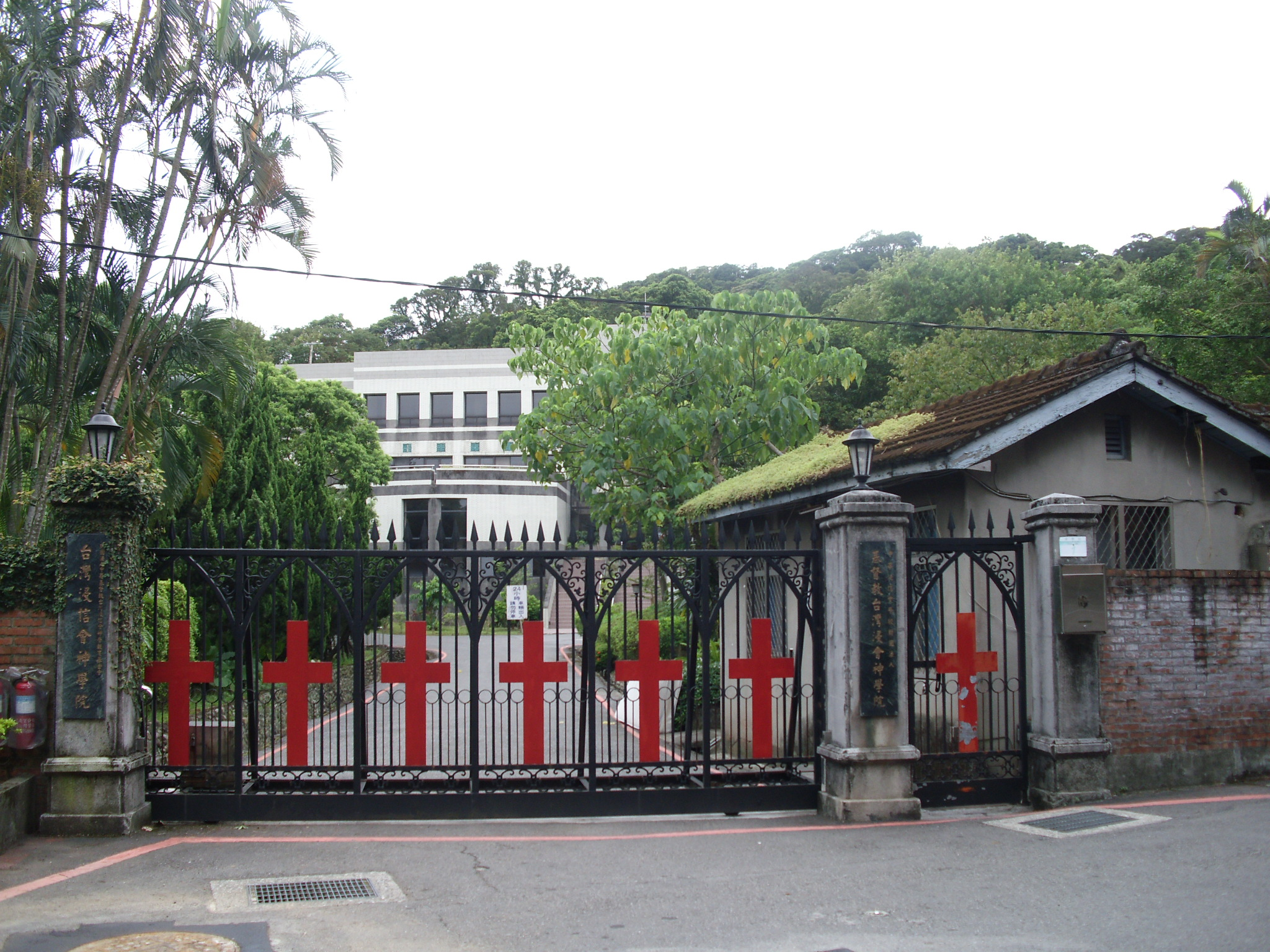
- Taiwan Baptist Theological Seminary in 2013
- Type: Private
- Established: 1952; 74 years ago
- Affiliation: Chinese Baptist Convention
- Location: Taipei
- Campus: Urban
- Website: www.tbtsf.org.tw/en/

Taiwan Baptist Theological Seminary (Chinese: 台灣浸信會神學院 is a private Baptist seminary in Taipei, Taiwan, associated with the Chinese Baptist Convention.

== History ==
The seminary was established in 1952 for the training of national workers. Until recently the seminary had faced problems from the authorities as it was an unrecognized institution and had faced accusations of awarding fraudulent academic degrees in the past. In 2005, the Legislative Yuan passed a resolution to provide for the framework of recognition of religious academic institutions and seminaries allowing the seminary to initiate the procedure of gaining full recognition from the authorities. In 2010, the Ministry of Education accredited the seminary and gave it the ability to grant degrees recognized by the government.
