= George Leslie Mackay =

First Presbyterian missionary to northern Taiwan

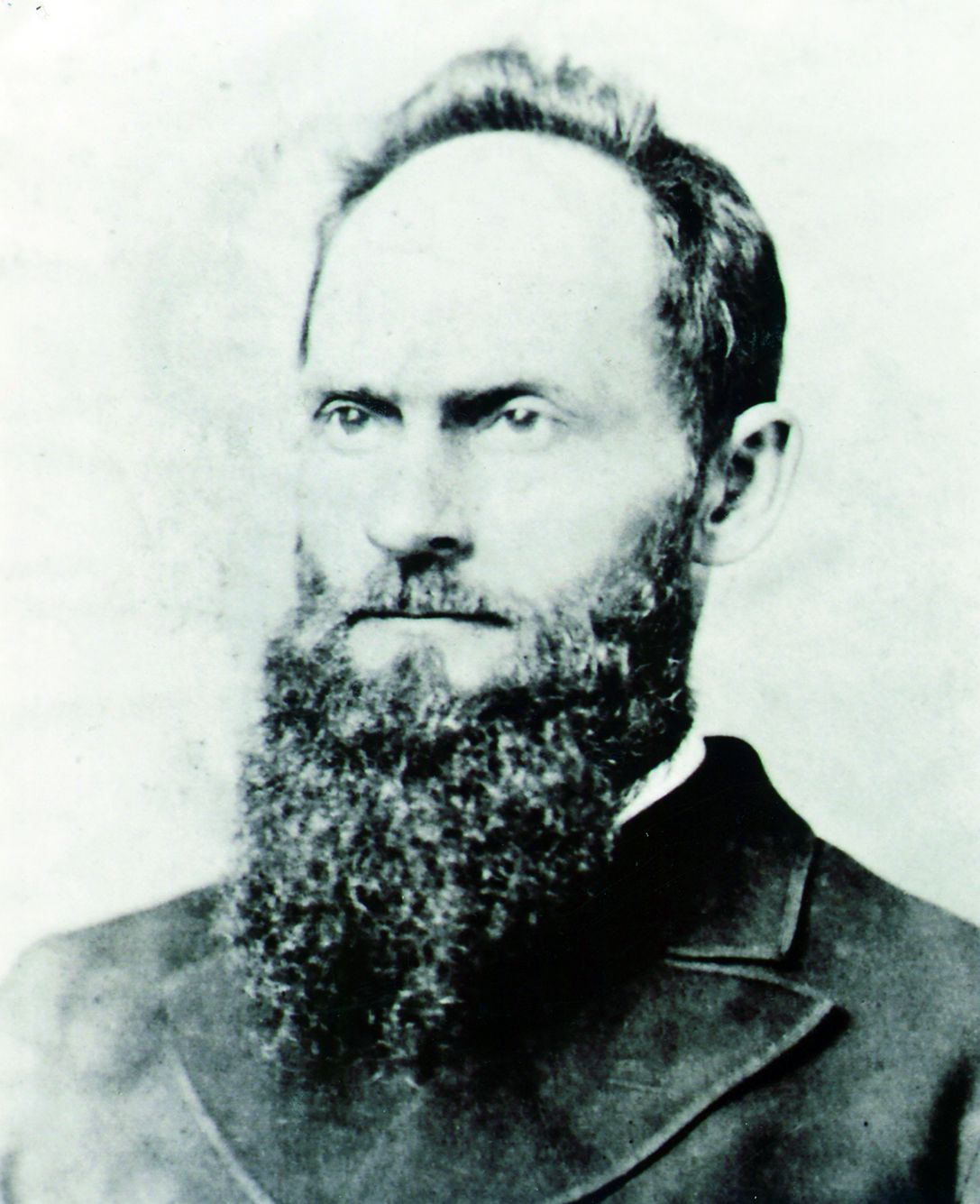
Mackay

George Leslie Mackay (偕瑞理 or 馬偕 Má-kai; 21 March 1844 – 2 June 1901) was a Canadian Presbyterian missionary. He was the first Presbyterian missionary to northern Taiwan (then Formosa), serving with the Canadian Presbyterian Mission. Mackay is among the best known and most influential Westerners to have lived in Taiwan.

== Early life ==
George Leslie Mackay was born on March 21, 1844, the youngest of six children to a pioneering Scottish family in Embro, Zorra Township, Oxford County, Canada West (now Ontario), Canada. His family was part of the Zorra Pioneers, refugees from the Sutherland Clearances in northern Scotland, who arrived in Zorra in 1830. The Zorra pioneers were Evangelical Presbyterians, for whom their church, led by lay elders, was the centre of their collective life.

He received his theological training at Knox College in Toronto (1865-1867), Princeton Theological Seminary in the United States (1870), and New College, Edinburgh in Scotland, all Presbyterian institutions. In Mackay's days Princeton and Edinburgh were important centres of advocacy and training for foreign missions.

== Mission to Taiwan ==
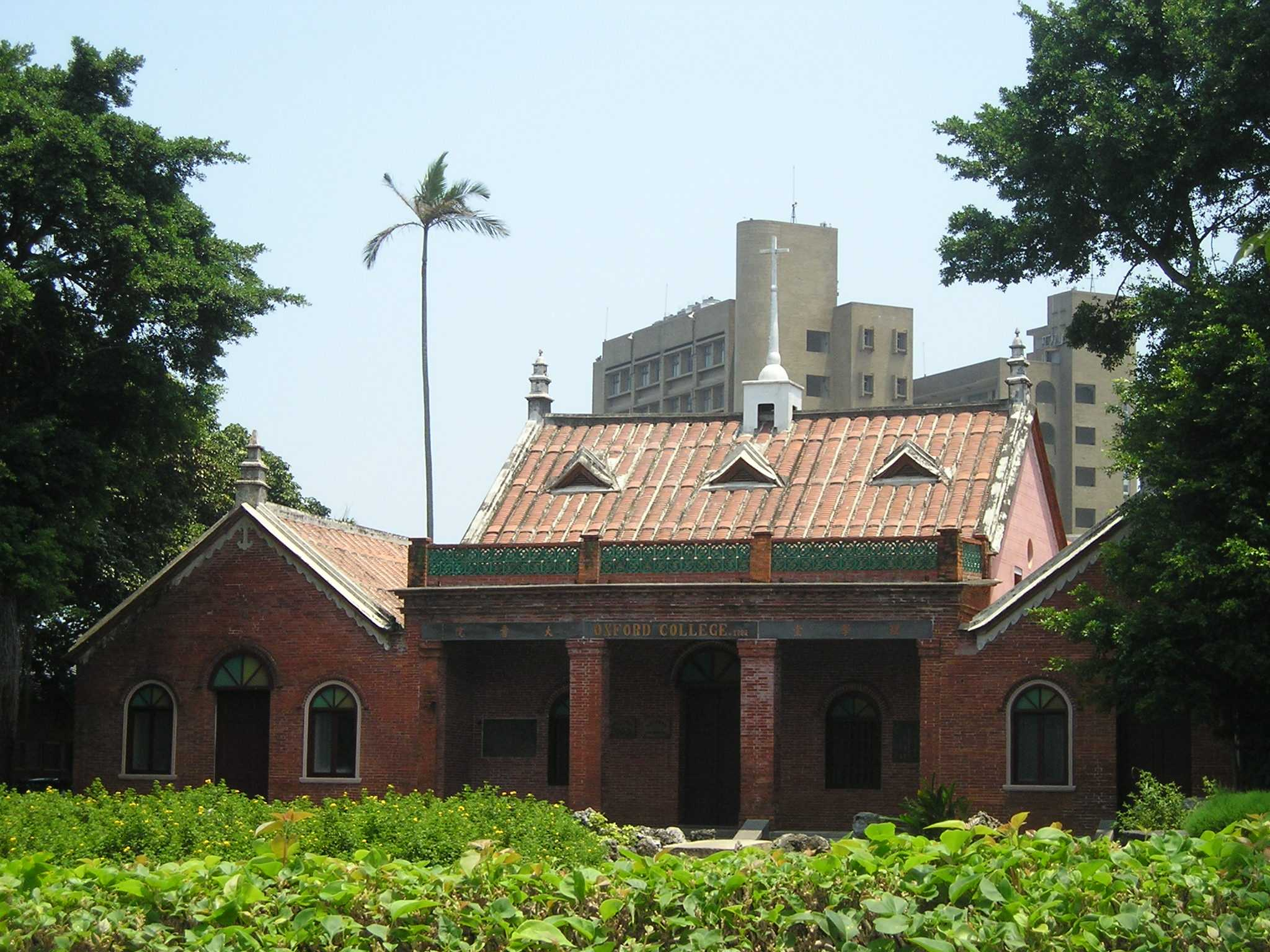
Original building of the Oxford University College founded by Mackay in Tamsui, Taiwan. Now named Aletheia University, the school administers a museum devoted to Mackay artifacts.

In 1871, Mackay became the first foreign missionary to be commissioned by the Canada Presbyterian Church (predecessor of both the Presbyterian Church in Canada and the United Church of Canada), arriving in Taiwan on December 29, 1871.

After consulting with Dr. James Laidlaw Maxwell Sr., a medical doctor serving as a Presbyterian Church of England missionary to southern Formosa (1865), Mackay arrived at Tamsui, northern Formosa in 1872, which remained his home until his death in 1901. Starting with an itinerant dentistry practice amongst the lowland aborigines, he later established churches, schools and a hospital practicing Western biomedicine.

Mackay learned to speak vernacular Taiwanese fluently and married "Minnie" Tiu (張聰明; Tiuⁿ Chhang-miâ), a native Taiwanese woman. The marriage produced three children:

- Mary "Tan" Mackay
- Bella "Koa" Mackay
- George William Mackay

Mackay was described by the Rev. William Campbell, a contemporary missionary, as:

...a little man, firm and active, of few words, unflinching courage, and one whose sound common sense is equalled only by his earnest devotion to the Master. [...] During the first year of his stay at Tamsui, he began an educational and evangelistic training movement among the young men who came about him, and this has been greatly blessed throughout that northern part of the Island.

Accompanied by his students, who were to become pastors of the churches founded, Mackay itinerated all across northern Taiwan. They founded 60 churches. Churches planted in north Taiwan by Mackay later became part of the Northern Synod of the present Presbyterian Church in Taiwan.

== Social impact of Mackay's mission ==
=== Revitalization movements ===
Anthony Wallace developed the idea of "revitalization movement" in his study of the Handsome Lake movement in the Seneca of New York, "to denote any conscious, organized effort by members of a society to construct a more satisfying culture. Since many revitalization movements are religious, the concept of revitalization becomes central to the analysis of the development of new religions". He argued that "when the misery of poverty and degradation is combined with a hope of moral and material salvation, the resulting mixture is explosive." (1969:239).

What resulted when the Kavalan people (噶瑪蘭) heard Mackay's preaching 1880s was a revitalization movement combining the egalitarian and salvific ideas of Mackay's Presbyterianism and their own resistance to the land loss, cultural collapse and humiliating poverty brought by Chinese invasion of their homeland in the 19th century.

=== Destruction of Kavalan Society ===
Indigenous historian Chan Su-chuan (詹素娟)，describes the “extremely difficult situation” confronting the Kavalan in the 1880s: “The period when Mackay entered Ilan was exactly the period in the late 19th century when traditional Kavalan society was facing shocks from an external power and was undergoing large scale forced emigration ... With the changes in their social and economic life, the traditional religion of the Kavalan people also underwent huge changes. Mackay observed that the faith of the Kavalan people was “at the present time a potpourri of Confucian morality, Buddhistic idolatry, and Tauistic demonolatry”, which is to say the Taiwanese folk religion of that time. But Mackay also saw that in fact the Kavalan people still “simultaneously” preserved their traditions “nature worship” and “relics of superstition”. Mackay wrote that the traditional religious life of the Kavalan “had no temple, idol or priest."

Mackay was angered at the plight of the Kavalan. He must have seen in their crisis a reflection of the collective memory of his own people, the Highland refugees from the Sutherland Clearances, who were burnt out of their cottages by officials clearing the land for sheep:

There were at one time thirty-six thriving villages in the Kap-tsu-lan plain. The Chinese settlers came in, enterprising, aggressive, and not overly scrupulous, and little by little the weaker went to the wall. The Pe-po-hoan were crowded out of the cultivated land, many of their villages were scattered, and they had to begin life again in the waste jungle. And, very often, when they had succeeded in reclaiming land to grow rice and vegetables enough to supply their meager wants, the greedy Chinese would appear again, and, either by winning their confidence or by engaging them in dispute, would gain a foothold and in the end rob them of their lands. Being unable to read and being ignorant of the law, they are almost entirely at the mercy of their enemies. It sometimes makes one’s blood boil to see the iniquities practised upon these simple-minded creatures by Chinese officials, speculators and traders.

He was aware of the political context of Kavalan adoption of Chinese idols:

Originally the Pe-po-hoan were nature worshippers, like the savages in the mountains …. But all this was changed when they bowed their necks to the yoke of civilization. Their conquerors forced upon them not only the cue and their style of dress, but also the whole paraphernalia of Chinese idolatry. Whenever a tribe submits, the first thing is to shave the head in token of allegiance, and then temples, idols and tablets are introduced. …. Idolatry does not suit the average Pe-po-hoan, and it is only of necessity that he submits to even the formal observance of its rites and ceremonies. It is political rather than religious, and to the large majority it is meaningless, except as a reminder of their enslavement to an alien race.

It is in this context that the rapid, mass conversion of almost one-half of the Kavalan people in the early 1880s can be understood. It was not a colonial fraud enforced upon devout practitioners of traditional Chinese folk religion, or destruction of indigenous people's traditional religion but an indigenous revitalization movement - a collective symbolic act of resistance to the dispossession they suffered under the Chinese settlers. Mackay was clearly astounded by the response of the Kavalan to his evangelism, so different from the process of conversion in the rest of north Taiwan.

=== Idol burning ===
The removal of idols and ancestral tablets by new Christians in Taiwan was usually a discreet individual decision. A typical reference (among many in Mackay's diary) to people removing idols, is in a letter of April 11, 1884: "An old Chinaman and his wife cleansed their house of idols last Saturday when I was in the country. These idols &c. are now with my large collection."

But in the Kavalan mission Mackay reports two instances of mass enthusiasm (another expression of a revitalization movement) expressed in communal removal and burning of Chinese household idols. The first is reported in letters of March 30 and June 5, 1883:

I am here about 4 days journey from Tamsui -on the east side of the Island with the Pacific dashing this shore. There are 36 villages of Pe-po-hoan (civilized aborigines) in this District. Fully one thousand (1000) have thrown away their idols and wish to be taught Christianity. .... I dried my clothes before fires made of idolatrous paper, idols &c. I employed 3 men to carry other idols back to Tamsui . I never passed through such an experience.

The revitalization movement in the form of communal removal of Chinese idols proceeded even without the presence of Mackay, who was amazed at what he saw happening. In a letter addressed "To the Presbyterian Church in Canada from Halifax to Manitoba" (June 5, 1883) he wrote:

I sent a telegram some time ago to say that 1000 were asking Christian instruction. I state below the mark now when I declare that upwards of 2000 (two thousand) have thrown idols away and wish to follow the Lord of Hosts. .... In a village with upwards of 200 every soul wants to be Christian – every house cleansed of idols. Another village with nearly 300 not very far away came out as a body, men, women and children and already sing our sweet hymns long in the night.

=== Visit to Kavalan settlement in Hualien – September 1890 ===
The second reference to communal idol burning is September 8–9, 1890, when Mackay, accompanied by Koa-kau and Tan-he travelled by boat to visit Kavalan people who had settled in Ka-le-oan (嘉禮宛) north of Hualien City (花蓮港). His letter to the Foreign Missionary Society (September 12) presents in detail the process of community decision making, the political symbolism of having idols, negotiating with the Chinese authorities for their consent to remove idols, and the celebratory nature of the burning, followed by a ritual celebrating the new communitas.

Mackay letter to Wardrope, October 16 1890:

About dark we entered Ka-le-oan (the Pin-po-hoan settlement I longed to visit for upwards of a dozen years). We found the cook, who turned out Preacher, in a small grass covered bamboo dwelling which had been erected for him. As they had been sending letters and visiting for such a long time you have only to imagine the reception accorded us. ... The room was soon packed and a large crowd stood in front of the door. Instead of continued preaching we tried to grasp the real state of affairs. Real good work was done by the Helper. Not a few had a clear idea of the Gospel message, while all were evidently wearied of idol worship. They seemed ripe for decisive action. Being told that the Military Mandarin declared that they must continue idolatry as being a token of subjection to China. I rode up to the encampment – had an interview and got a gracious reception. Whatever was said or done in the past, it was all right now. Soldiers began to praise our mission ..... There was only one opinion and the Official wished me "Peace". I galloped back and asked all who were for the True God to clean their houses of idols and take a decided stand. – A council was held at dark in an open space, it turned out to be a boisterous one. The chiefs were declaiming aloud in their native tongue. I stepped into their midst – and asked an explanation – asked if there was difference of opinion? An answer came quickly, the five villages were unanimous to a man. Every man, woman and child wished to worship One God the Creator of all. They were noisy because giving vent to their indignation for having served idols for so long. – Another important transaction was executed – a temple for idols built by themselves at a cost of $2000 was handed over for chapel service the all retired and the tumult abated. The following was a joyous day; no one went to work – The Head men joined our party (after invitation) and ordered four boys to carry 8 baskets one on each end of a pole. Then we went from village to village and house to house until the idolatrous paraphernalia all were put into the baskets and carried to a yard near our Preaching room and temple. – There was large Pile of mock money – idols – incense sticks, flags &c &c --- a great crowd assembled and several vied with each other in kindling it – many showed their contempt for the dirty, dusty, greasy old idols and all were jubilant over the work. ... Nearly five hundred idolaters cleaned their houses of idols in our presence.

== Other results of Mackay's Kavalan mission ==
Similar to other indigenous groups in northern Taiwan, the Kavalan has a patronymic name system, rather than surnames. When they came under Chinese rule they were assigned Chinese names and surnames. By the mid-1880s some Kavalan had adopted Mackay's Taiwanese surname “Kai” 偕 as their own. This surname is still common among Kavalan people today.

In 1882, Oxford College (for men) was opened in Tamsui and a year later the Girls School. Soon both schools had Kavalan students. In 1884 John Jamieson reported in a letter to the Foreign Mission Committee (June 30, 1884) that "The girls have made excellent progress during their four months of study. Most of them can read the Colloquial language as well as write a fair hand. ... Most of the students have left for their homes and Dr. Mackay will accompany the girls on their homeward journey."

At the girls' school Kai Ah-hun was matron and instructor in traditional weaving and sewing. She was married to a Kavalan pastor. Mackay brought an entire Kavalan bridal assemblage made by her to Canada in 1893. This is known because he had a photograph of her taken wearing the very clothes that are now in the Royal Ontario Museum. The Kavalan bridal attire is the only complete set of Kavalan clothes in the world.

Among the ten Plains Indigenous groups (Ping-pu 平埔) who occupied the entire western half of Taiwan, only the Kavalan have continued as an organized community, still using their own language, in their exilic home on the northern coast of Hualien County. In the last decade a group of women weavers (the leader is surnamed Kai 偕) have been reviving traditional weaving. They hope to visit the Mackay Collection at the Royal Ontario Museum to study the textiles that came from Kai Ah-hun in 1893.

While the mission among the Kavalan was only one part of Mackay's 30-year life in Taiwan, it illustrates the unintended yet long lasting impact of Mackay's work, and helps explain why even after 150 years he is celebrated in Taiwan's history.

In 1896, after the 1895 establishment of Japanese colonial rule in Taiwan, Mackay met with the Japanese Governor-General of Formosa, Maresuke Nogi. Some families in Taiwan today, particularly of lowland-aboriginal Kavalan ancestry, trace their surname '偕' ('Kai' or 'Kay') to their family's conversion to Christianity by Mackay.

In Canada Mackay was honoured during his two furloughs home by the Canadian Church. In 1880, Queen's College in Kingston, Ontario awarded him an honorary Doctor of Divinity, presented by Principal George Monro Grant and Chancellor Sandford Fleming. Before departing in 1881, he returned to Oxford County, where monies were raised to start Oxford College in Taiwan, which would be the basis for two later educational institutions, Aletheia University and Taiwan Seminary. A number of young people in the county were inspired to follow Mackay's example and entered into missionary service with a number of Christian denominations.

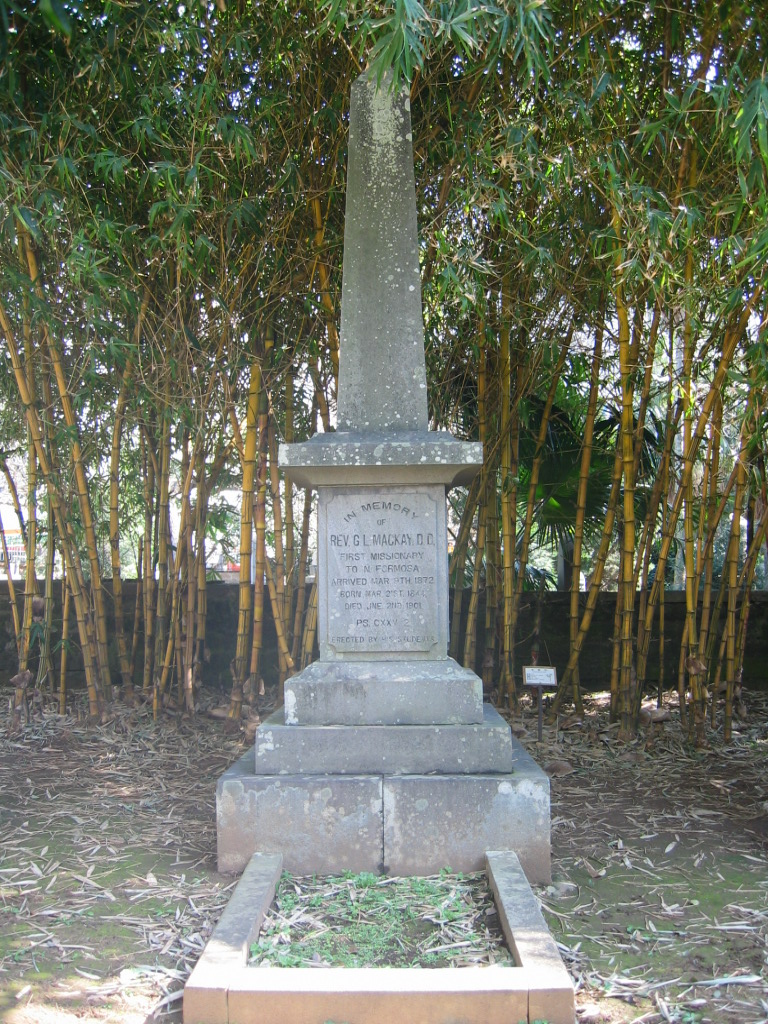
Mackay monument in Taiwan at Tamsui

In June 1894, at the General Assembly meeting in St. John, New Brunswick, Mackay was elected Moderator of the Presbyterian Church in Canada, the highest elected position in the church. He spent the following Moderatoral year travelling across Canada, as well as writing From Far Formosa: the island, its people and missions, a missionary ethnography and memoir of his missionary experiences.

In 1894 he spoke out against the head tax imposed on Chinese immigrants to Canada. As moderator of the Presbyterian church, he broke precedent to speak in favor of a resolution opposing this tax, saying it was unjust and racist.

Although Mackay suffered from meningitis and malaria in his lifetime, he would die of throat cancer on 2 June 1901 in Tamsui. He was interred in Tamsui, Taiwan, in a small cemetery in the eastern corner of the Tamkang Middle School campus. His son was interred adjacent to him.

== Legacy ==
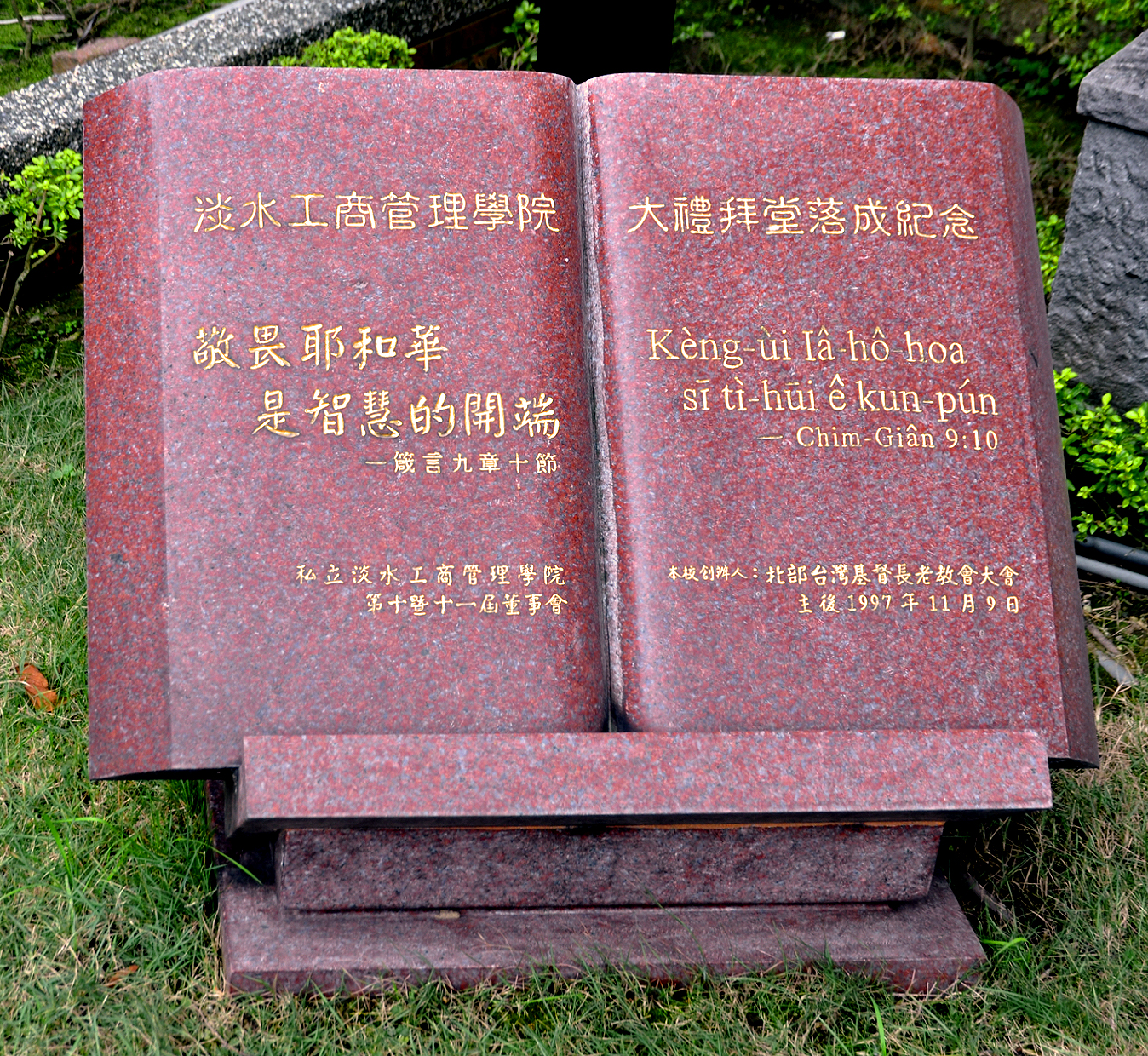
A sculpture at Aletheia University displays the text of Proverbs 9.10 in Mandarin and romanised Taiwanese.

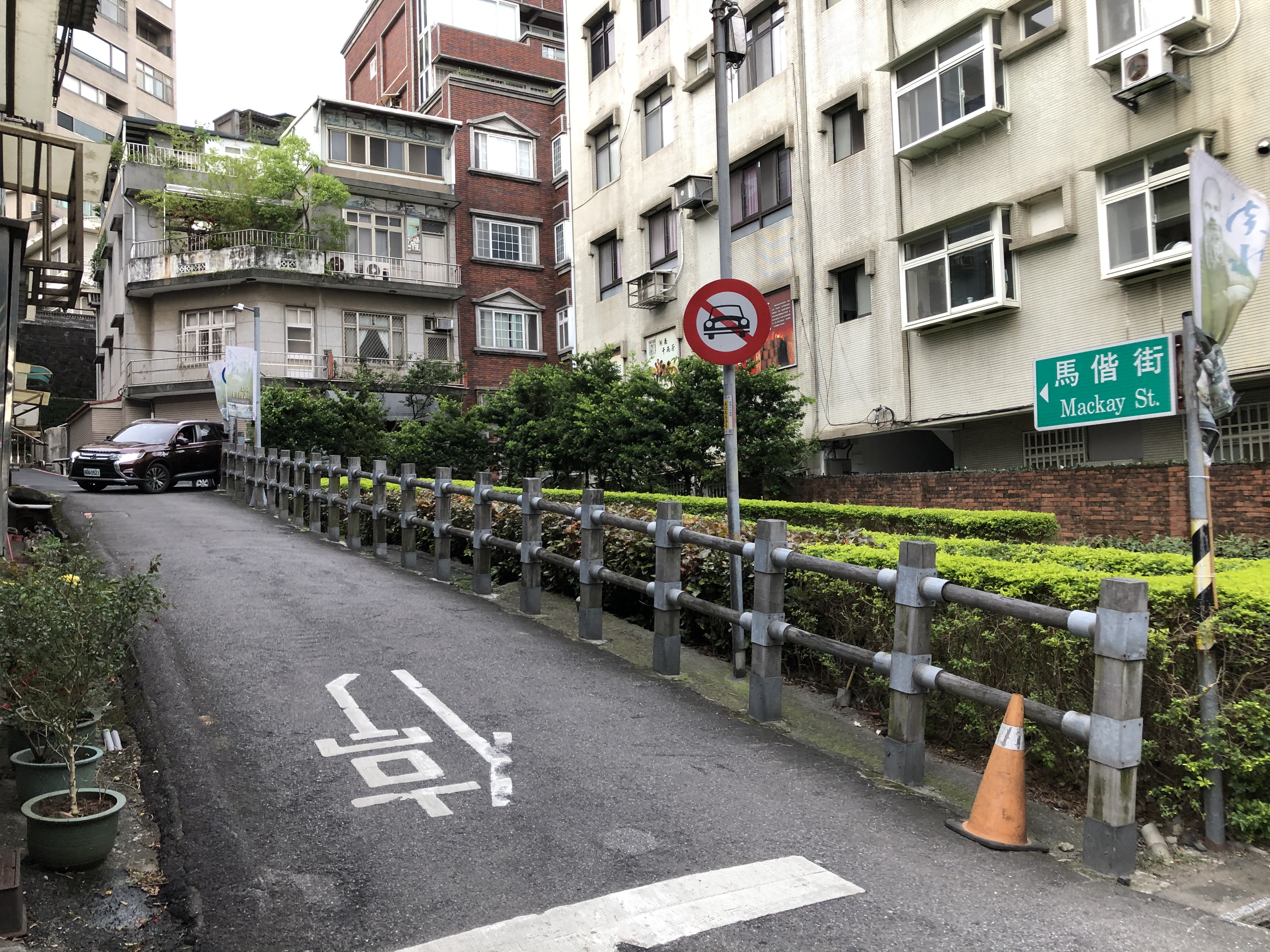
Street in New Taipei named after Mackay

In Taiwan's modern democratic period, Mackay's life has been celebrated by advocates of a distinctive Taiwanese identity and historical understanding separate from colonial narratives brought by Japan and China. The system of phonetic romanisation he and his collaborators developed for writing Taiwan's Hokkien language is still in use.

Mackay's From Far Formosa is considered an important early missionary ethnography of Taiwan. It provides a valuable source document for understanding the culture and customs of the people of Taiwan during Mackay's lifetime.

As part of his teaching, Mackay created a museum in his Tamsui home. Its collections of items from both Chinese and Indigenous cultures of Taiwan, and specimens of geology, flora and fauna was constantly replentished by donations from local people. Many items collected by Mackay are today housed at the Royal Ontario Museum (Ontario, Canada) and the Aletheia University Museum (Tamsui, Taiwan). James Rohrer, missionary historian, states that Mackay, "allowed himself to truly encounter and to be transformed by the people he sought to serve."

=== Community ===
Mackay's Oxford College (牛津學堂) is today known as Aletheia University. The major private Christian hospital in downtown Taipei is named Mackay Memorial Hospital, built in 1912 to replace the smaller Mackay Hospital he started in Tamsui in 1882. Many artefacts collected by Mackay today form part of the collections at the Royal Ontario Museum (Ontario, Canada) and Aletheia University (Tamsui, Taiwan).

=== Visual art and media ===
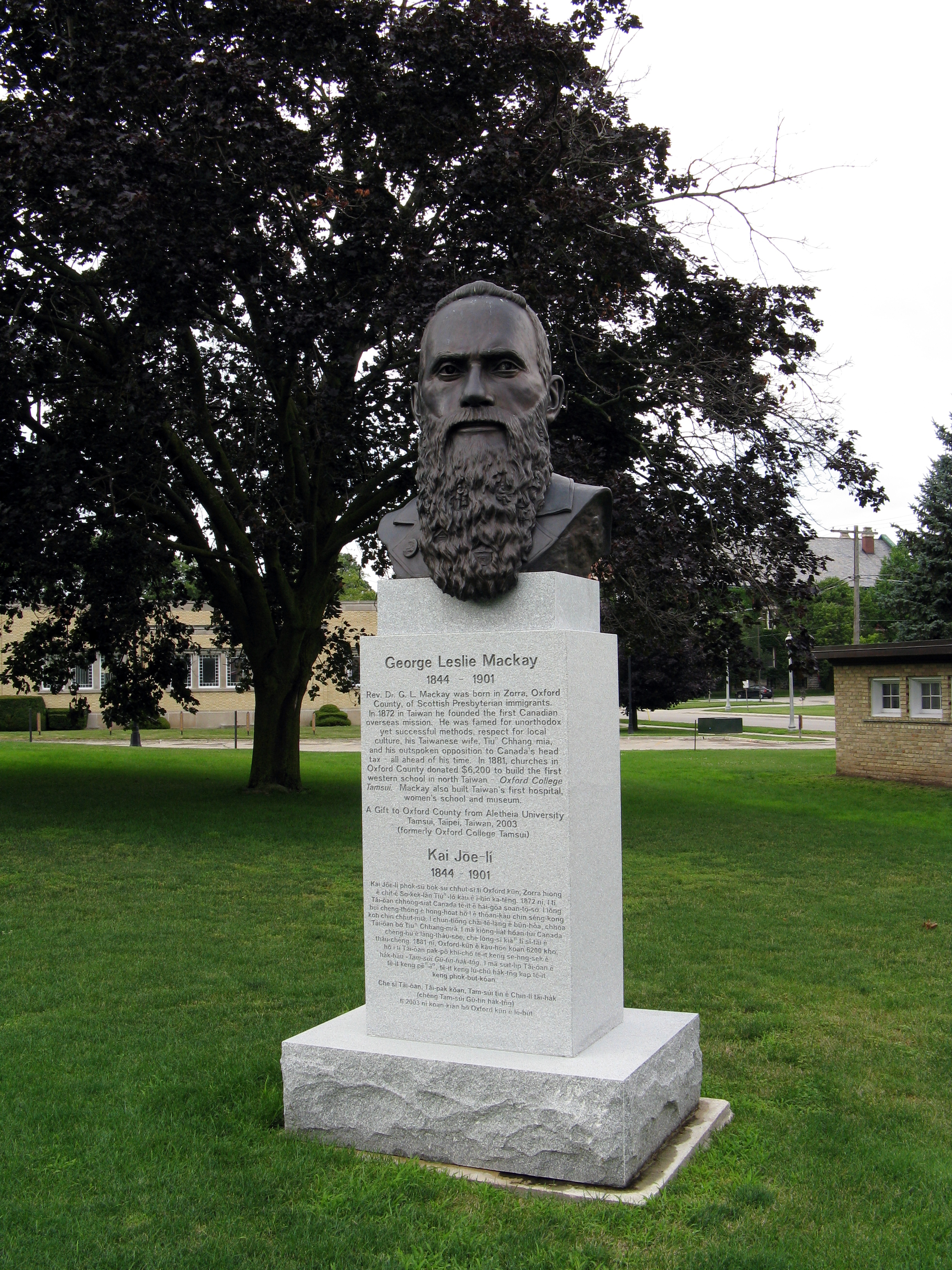
Mackay monument in Canada at Woodstock, Ontario

On 30 June 2004, a large bust statue of Mackay was dedicated outside the Oxford County offices in Woodstock, Ontario. The delegation from Taiwan in attendance included representatives from Aletheia University and the Presbyterian Church in Taiwan. The event was also attended by representatives of the Presbyterian Church in Canada, the United Church of Canada, local, regional, and national Canadian dignitaries, and a number of Mackay descendants from across North America. One of his grandchildren is Dr. John Ross Mackay.

In November 2006, a Canadian television documentary titled The Black Bearded Barbarian of Taiwan was aired. It was broadcast in both Mandarin and English on OMNI 2 as part of their Signature Series.

=== Performance art ===
==== Opera ====
Composer Gordon S.W. Chin and librettist Joyce Chiou set out in 2002 to create an opera whose subject was drawn from Taiwan's history. In 2008 Taiwan's government invested in the project: the world's first-ever Taiwanese grand opera, Mackay: The Black-Bearded Bible Man. Chin's opera drew inspiration from the events of the missionary's life and took more than five years to produce. Over a hundred singers and production crew were engaged for the project from Europe, Asia, and North America.

Mackay: The Black-Bearded Bible Man had its world premier on 27 November 2008 at Taiwan's National Theater and ran through 30 November. The large cast featured Thomas Meglioranza (baritone) as George Mackay, Chen Mei-Lin (soprano) as Mackay's wife Tiuⁿ Chhang-miâ, and Choi Seung-Jin (tenor) as Giâm Chheng-hoâ, Mackay's first disciple and follower in Taiwan. Chien Wen-Pin, a native of Taipei, conducted the National Symphony Orchestra (Taiwan). Lukas Hemleb directed the stage production.

==== Musical theatre ====
Kai the Barbarian: the George Leslie Mackay Story, a musical theatre piece by William Butt, was performed March 21–31, 2018 at Thistle Theatre in Embro, Ontario, Canada. The stage director was Edward Daranyi and music director was Daniel Van Winden. Embro, hometown of the author, is located in Zorra Township. where Mackay was born and raised. Cast and crew consisted of local volunteers working alongside professionals from Stratford, Ontario.

== See also ==
- J. Ross Mackay (born 1915), his grandson
- Thomas Barclay, English Presbyterian missionary to Taiwan
- James Mellon Menzies, Canadian Presbyterian missionary to Qing China
- Mackay Memorial Hospital
- Mackay Medical College
- Mackay Medicine, Nursing and Management College
- Aletheia University

== Published works ==
- Mackay, George L. (1896). Macdonald, James A. (ed.). From Far Formosa: the island, its people and missions. New York: F. H. Revell Co. OCLC 855518794.
- Mackay, George L. (1900) [1895]. Macdonald, James A. (ed.). From Far Formosa: the island, its people and missions. Edinburgh and London: Oliphant, Anderson and Ferrier. hdl:2027/miun.ajl0516.0001.001. OCLC 607730510.
