= Yu-Shan Theological College and Seminary =

Yu-Shan Theological College & Seminary (Chinese: 玉山神學院)
- Type: Private, seminary
- Established: 1946
- Location: No. 28, Section 1, Chinan Road, Chinan Village, Shoufeng Township, Hualien County, Republic of China (Taiwan)
- Campus: Suburban
- Website: www.yushanth.org.tw

Yu-Shan Theological College and Seminary (Chinese: 玉山神學院; lit. 'Mount Jade Seminary'), shortly Yushan Seminary, is a Protestant institution located in Hualien County, Taiwan. Since its establishment in 1946, Yushan Seminary has been the only theological school dedicated to Taiwanese indigenous peoples. It offers programs ranging from educational certificates to doctoral degrees. The school is affiliated with the Presbyterian Church of Taiwan and is a member of the Association for Theological Education in Southeast Asia.

== History ==
In 1946, Pastor Wen Rongchun, entrusted by missionary James Ira Dickson, established the "Taiwan Bible School" (台灣聖書學校) to cultivate talents for indigenous missionary work. The school borrowed the agricultural training center in Fushi Village, Xiulin Township, Hualien County for classrooms.

In 1949, the school moved to Xia Meilun aluminum company's employee dormitory and shared the building with the "Holy Light Handicraft Workshop" for classes. In the same year, the school was renamed "Taiwan Bible Academy" (台灣聖經學園).

In 1957, the school moved to the mountain clinic in Guanshan Township, Taitung County, and was renamed "Yushan Bible Academy (玉山聖經書院)."

In 1958, Lillian R. Dickson (wife of James Ira Dickson), the founder of the Mustard Seed Society, established a volunteer school for indigenous people in Hualien, providing training in agriculture, animal husbandry, carpentry, hairdressing, and Bible education. Many indigenous people who were enthusiastic about theology entered Yushan Theological Seminary after graduating from the volunteer school. This also meant that nearly half of the early indigenous preachers or pastors of the Presbyterian Church in Taiwan were graduates of the Mustard Seed Society's volunteer school.

In 1959, the school moved to its current location at Liyutan and was renamed "Yushan Theological Seminary" (玉山神學書院).

In 1977, the name was changed to "Yu-Shan Theological College and Seminary" (玉山神學院).

In 1993, the Research Institute of Theology was established.

On September 15 2022, the school held a thanksgiving service to mark the start of the new academic year and the inauguration of the 13th president, Pastor Walis Ukan of the Seediq tribe.

In 2024, the school hosted the annual conference of the Society of Asian Biblical Studies (SABS), focusing on biblical hermeneutics in indigenous perspectives. Scholars from over 17 countries participated, highlighting Yushan’s role in global indigenous theological education.

== Academic Programs ==
Yushan Seminary offers a range of programs:

- Undergraduate Degrees:
  - Bachelor of Arts in Religion, B.A.R.
- Graduate Degrees:
  - Master of Divinity (M.Div.)
  - Master of Theology (M.Th.)
  - Master of Arts, M.A.
  - Doctor of Ministry, D.Min.
- Extension Programs:
  - Lay theological education
  - Continuing education for pastors

There were 223 students and 12 teachers in the 2024 academic year.

== Indigenous Engagement ==
Yushan Seminary is deeply embedded in Taiwan indigenous communities:

- Students and faculty represent multiple indigenous groups (including Truku, Amis, Drekay, Paiwan, Bunun, Tayal)
- Worship services incorporate indigenous languages and rituals
- Hosts events like “Indigenous Month” and “Ethnic Worship Celebrations”
- Promotes indigenous biblical hermeneutics and theology.

The total population of Taiwanese indigenous peoples is approximately 460,000, of whom more than 300,000 are Christians. Graduates of Yushan Seminary account for about half of all indigenous Christian missionaries.

== Leadership ==
First president: Wen Rongchun (溫榮春, September 1946 - February 1949)

Acting president (August 2001 - July 2002) and Ninth-Eleventh president (August 2002 - July 2022): Rev. Pusin Tali (布興‧大立). He was also appointed Taiwan’s first ambassador-at-large for religious freedom in 2019.

Current (Twelfth) president: Walis Ukan (August 2022 - )

== Campus ==
The school is located at No. 28, Section 1, Chinan Road, Chinan Village, Shoufeng Township, Hualien County, Republic of China (Taiwan), near the scenic Liyu Lake and surround by mountains.

== See also ==
- Taiwanese indigenous peoples
- Presbyterian Church of Taiwan
- List of evangelical seminaries and theological colleges
