= Taiwan Seminary =

Presbyterian seminary in Taiwan

Coordinates: 25.1008°N 121.5418°E

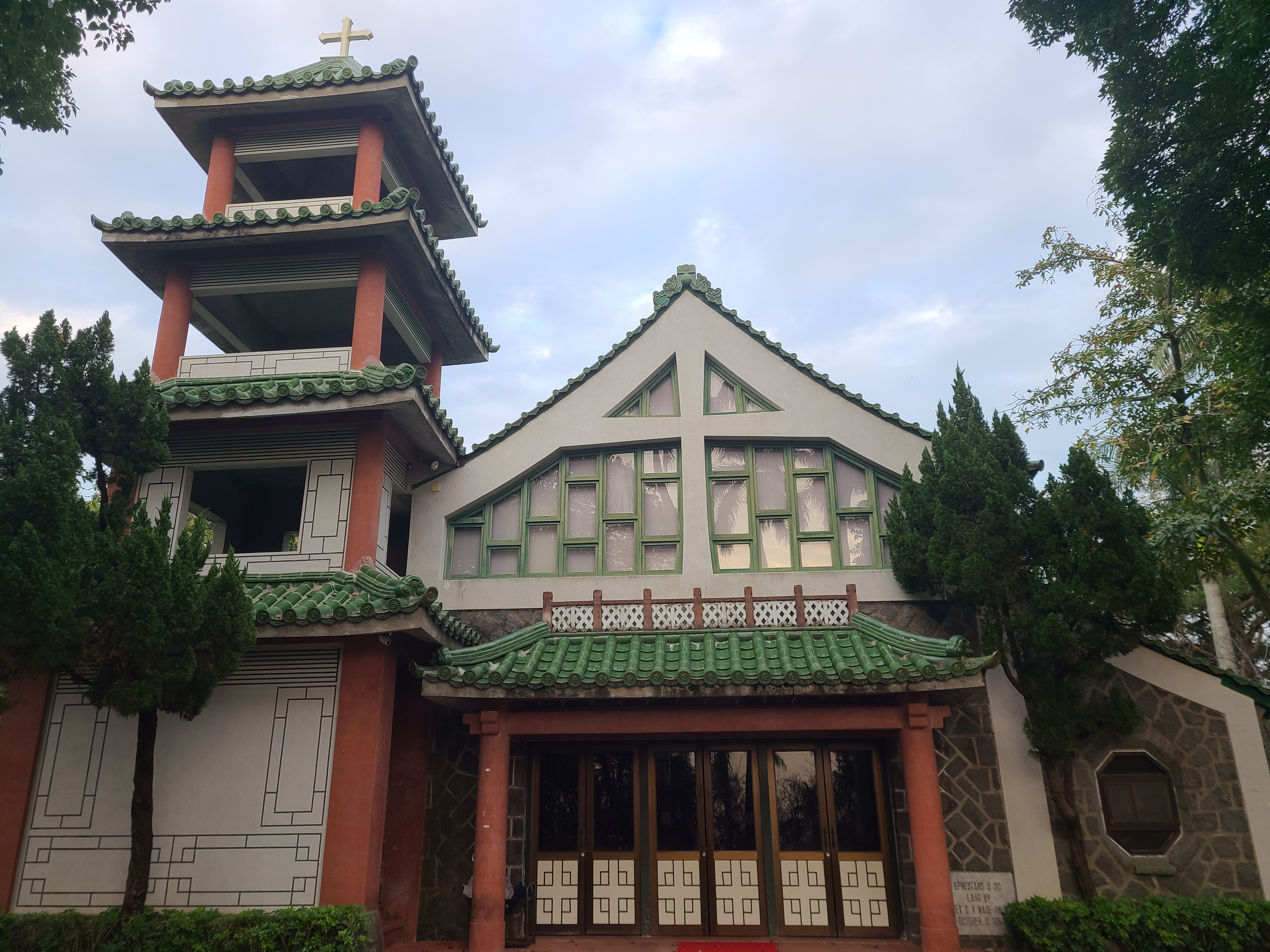
- Taiwan Seminary Chapel
- Other names: Taiwan Theological College and Seminary
- Motto: 'Faith in God, love towards humanity, compassion towards the land'「對上帝有信、對人有愛、對土地有情」
- Established: 1872
- Religious affiliation: Presbyterian Church in Taiwan
- President: Tsai Tzu-Lun
- Academic staff: 17
- Students: 229
- Location: 20, Lane 2, Sec. 2, Yang De Blvd., Shilin Taipei 111, Taiwan, Taipei, Taiwan

Taiwan Seminary or Taiwan Theological College and Seminary or Taiwan Graduate School of Theology, also known as 'Taishen' (Chinese: 台灣神學院; pinyin: Táiwān shénxuéyuàn, Taiwanese: Tâi-oân Sîn-ha̍k-ī) is a private Presbyterian educational institution in Taipei, Taiwan. It constitutes one of three seminaries of the Presbyterian Church of Taiwan, along with Tainan Theological College and Seminary (in Tainan) and Yushan Theological Seminary in Hualien.

== History ==
=== Pre-war ===
The Seminary was founded by George Leslie Mackay, a missionary teacher despatched to Taiwan by the Canadian Presbyterian Church. Teacher under Dr Mackay began in Tamsui in 1872, and was geared towards the formation of ministers. Initially Mackay taught a small group of students during his evangelistic itineration and he referred to the school as the "Peripatetic College" or "Itinerant College." By 1882 construction of the Seminary's first building had been completed. The building was named "Oxford College" after Mackay's hometown in Oxford County, Ontario. In 1901 the deanship of the Seminary was transferred to Rev. William Gauld.

Under new leadership the school moved its premises to Shuanglian, Taipei, in 1914. The Seminary was briefly closed during the Japanese occupation, and its premises were used by Japanese military from 1944 until 1945.

=== Post-war ===
After the war, Taishen was led by Rev. James Ira Dickson (孫雅各, 1900-1967) who was committed to improving the school’s infrastructure, standards for incoming students, and the granting of academic degrees. At the 7th Taiwan Presbyterian General Conference of 1954, the seminary trustees were authorized to sell the old school premises and purchase a piece of approximately sixty thousand square feet of land perched on the lower part of the Yangming Mountain as the new campus site. Upon the completion of the William Gauld Memorial Hall, currently the administrative building, and the male dormitory on September 21, 1956, the seminary was ready to relocate from Shuanglian to Lingtou and begin classes. During the following year, the Christian Education Department was added, followed by the Church Music Department. Evening seminars also started to be held.

=== Taiwan Graduate School of Theology ===
Taiwan Seminary was eventually accredited according to the 'Private School Rules' promulgated by the Governor's Office in 1992. In 2004, the Legislative Yuan revised the “Private Schools Law” to include a “Religious Training College” clause. In view of this new law, Taiwan Theological College and Seminary could allow graduates of Taishen to obtain a degree recognized by the Ministry of Education and also be able to create connections with other religious institutions and seminaries at home and abroad. Taishen then set out to begin discussions for registering the school with the Ministry of Education. In 2010, a “Taiwan Theological College and Seminary Consortium” was established to prepare for the process. On June 15, 2015, the “Taiwan Graduate School of Theology” was approved for accreditation and enrollment began under the new accredited school during the 2016 academic year.

In 2022, Taiwan Seminary celebrated its 150th anniversary, holding a series of lectures, commemorations, and other events.

== Academics ==
In addition to TGST's extension program, which offers courses to adult students off-campus, TGST offers several core, academic degrees. The main theological degree is the Master of Divinity. Students register in one of two departments: the Department of Christian Studies and the Department of Theological Studies. In addition the school has a Postgraduate Department that offers Master of Theology and Doctor of Philosophy degrees, as well as a Doctor of Ministry that provides doctoral training for those already in ministry. There are also Masters of Arts degrees offered in church music and counseling.

Students of the School are encouraged to engage with the broader Presbyterian tradition. TGST’s North American Presbyterian heritage endures through the institution of initiatives such as the annual Excellence in Preaching award, named in honor of the Presbyterian theologian and author Frederick Buechner.

Taiwan Seminary has two endowed, annual lectures: the Mackay Lectures and the Shuanglian Lectures. The Mackay lectures are invited academic lectures, and in recent years have included international figures like Brian Stanley, Luke Powery, David Ferguson, Brian Blount, Choon Leong Seow, and Michael Welker, as well as senior faculty including Sun Po-Lin and Lin Hong-Hsin. The Shunaglian lectures are directed more towards clergy and alumni and have featured discussions on topics like body theology, ecclesiology, or women in ministry. Taiwan Seminary has some partnerships with seminaries abroad, for instance with Knox College in Toronto and Union Presbyterian Seminary in Richmond, Virginia.

=== Library ===
The library of the Taiwan Theological College and Seminary grew from the holdings of the Oxford College, founded in 1882 (now a sister institution, Aletheia University). That original library began as a simple reading room for missionaries themselves. As more and more missionaries arrived, the collection rapidly grew; and since many missionaries left their books to the library when they departed, the collection steadily expanded. At that time, most of the library’s books were in English. Yet during the period of Japanese colonization, Japanese-language books were also added to the collection. Finally, with the arrival of the Nationalist Kuomintang party from China, Chinese books also started to enter the collection. Since English has become the standard for international academic publications, especially in the areas of Christian religion and philosophy, the majority of the library’s holdings are in English. And yet the recent boom in Chinese-language theological literature has allowed the library to increase its Chinese holdings, so that Chinese books now account for approximately 40% of the library’s collection. The library uses the Library of Congress classification system. The library has more than 95,000 volumes, including more 36,000 books in Chinese and more than 42,000 in other languages.

=== Research Centers ===
Taiwan Seminary has three research centers dedicated to history, theology, and intercultural studies. In addition to the Intercultural Studies Center, Taiwan Seminary is also home to a Center for the Study of Taiwanese Christian History, and the a Center for the Study of Christian Thought.

The Center for the Study of Christian Thought (CSCT) is chiefly dedicated to the history of Reformation thought and the Protestant tradition and hosts conferences on theology.

The Center for the Study of Taiwanese Christian History collects and preserves relevant information and data regarding Taiwan’s church history, with the twin purposes of further research and teaching. The collections held at the Center include documents and publications created by early Taiwanese churches and institutions of the Northern Synod of the Presbyterian Church in Taiwan, including: the Northern Synod, Taipei Presbytery, Taipei Central Presbytery, Seven Stars Presbytery, Hsinchu Presbytery, and the Central Eastern Presbytery. Beyond presbytery and institutional documents, the Center also collects reports from local congregations.

== Notable people ==
Taiwan Seminary faculty are widely known for contributions in the fields of history, theology, and Biblical studies. The school has famously included a series of missionaries on its faculty.
