= Aletheia University =

Private university

Coordinates: 25.176660°N 121.434621°E

- 真理大學
- Former names: Oxford College; Tamsui Institute of Industrial & Business Administration
- Motto: 虔誠、質實、勤勞、服務、科學、健康、前進(Pe̍h-ōe-jī: Khiân-sêng, chit-si̍t, khîn-lô, ho̍k-bū, kho-ha̍k, kiān-khong, chiân-chìn)
- Motto in English: Pious, solid, hard-working, serving, scientific, healthy, progressive
- Type: Private
- Established: 1882 (as Oxford College)
- Location: New Taipei City
- Website: www.au.edu.tw

Aletheia University
- Traditional Chinese: 真理大學
- Simplified Chinese: 真理大学
Transcriptions
Standard Mandarin
- Hanyu Pinyin: Zhēnlǐ Dàxué
Southern Min
- Hokkien POJ: Chin-lí Tāi-ha̍k

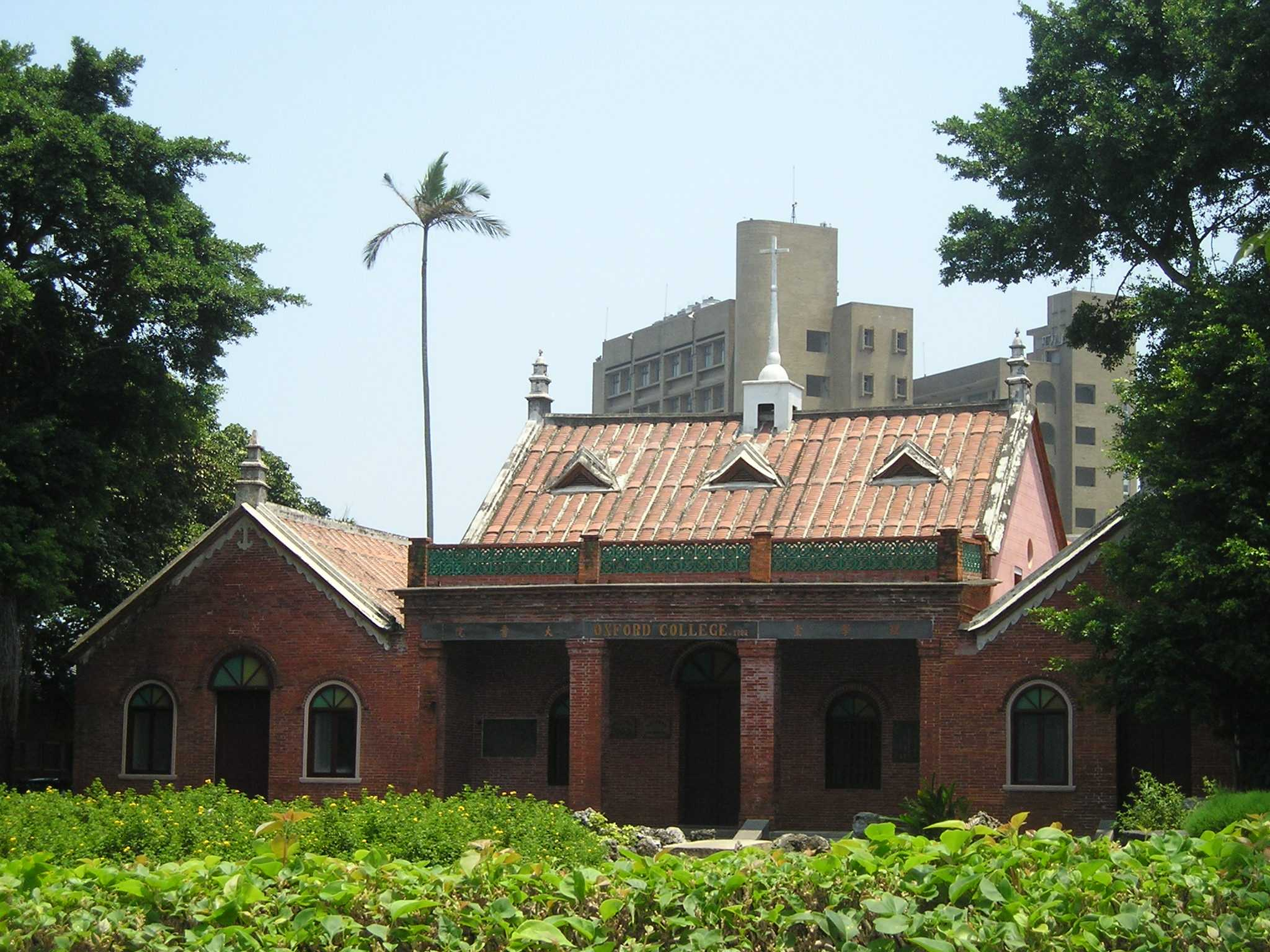
The former Oxford University College founded by Mackay is now part of Aletheia University, Tamsui.

Aletheia University (AU; Greek: ἀλήθεια, lit. 'truth'; Chinese: 真理大學; pinyin: Zhēnlǐ dàxué) is a private university in Tamsui, New Taipei City, Taiwan. Founded by Presbyterian minister George Leslie Mackay in 1882 as Oxford College, it is one of the oldest institutions of higher education in the country. It maintains affiliation with the Presbyterian Church in Taiwan.

== History ==
In 1872, Dr. George Leslie Mackay, a missionary from the Presbyterian Church in Canada, designed and supervised the construction of the original school building. He named it "Oxford College" as a gesture of thanks to the residents of Oxford County in Ontario, Canada, who had made financial donations. It was completed in 1882. The curriculum included courses in theology, Bible studies, sociology, logic, classical Chinese literature, Chinese history, natural sciences, and basic medicine, anatomy, and clinical practices. Oxford College was an early example of western-style institution and general education in Taiwan.

The Northern Synod of the Presbyterian Church in Taiwan was the founder of the later university, which the group planned in 1959 to establish at the location of Oxford College. In August 1965, the Ministry of Education gave approval for the Tamsui Institute of Industrial & Business Administration. In April 1971, its name was changed to Tamsui Oxford College.

In 1991, 18.8 hectares of land was purchased to create a branch school in Matou, Tainan county. The school received permission to become a four-year college called the Tamsui Oxford University College in August 1994. The Matou branch began accepting students, with an emphasis on two-year technical education, in February 1997.

In August 1999, the school was renamed Aletheia University, after the Greek word for truth. As of 2025, the university has 22 departments and offers nine vocational Bachelor's programs and eight Master's programs. They are organized into five colleges including Humanities, Finance and Economics, Management, "Tourism, Leisure, and Sports", and Information Sciences and Business Intelligence.

== Notable alumni ==
- Wu Chih-chung, ambassador and deputy minister of foreign affairs
- Kuo Kuo-wen, member of the Legislative Yuan
- Emerson Tsai, actor, television host and singer
- Queenie Tai, actress

== See also ==
- List of universities in Taiwan
- Taiwan Seminary
