= Chinese Baptist Convention =

Baptist Christian denomination in Taiwan

- Logo of the Chinese Baptist Convention
- Classification: Evangelical Christianity
- Theology: Baptist
- Polity: Congregationalist
- Associations: Asia Pacific Baptist Federation, Baptist World Alliance
- Region: Republic of China (Taiwan)
- Headquarters: Taipei
- Origin: 1954
- Congregations: 252
- Members: 24,019
- Seminaries: Taiwan Baptist Theological Seminary
- Official website: www.twbap.org.tw

The Chinese Baptist Convention (CBC; Chinese: 中華基督教浸信會聯會; pinyin: zhōnghuá jīdū jiào jìnxìn huì liánhuì; Wade–Giles: chung hua chi tu chiao chin hsin hui lien hui) is a Baptist Christian denomination in Taiwan and the territories administered by the Republic of China. It is affiliated with the Asia Pacific Baptist Federation and the Baptist World Alliance. The headquarters is in Taipei.

== History ==
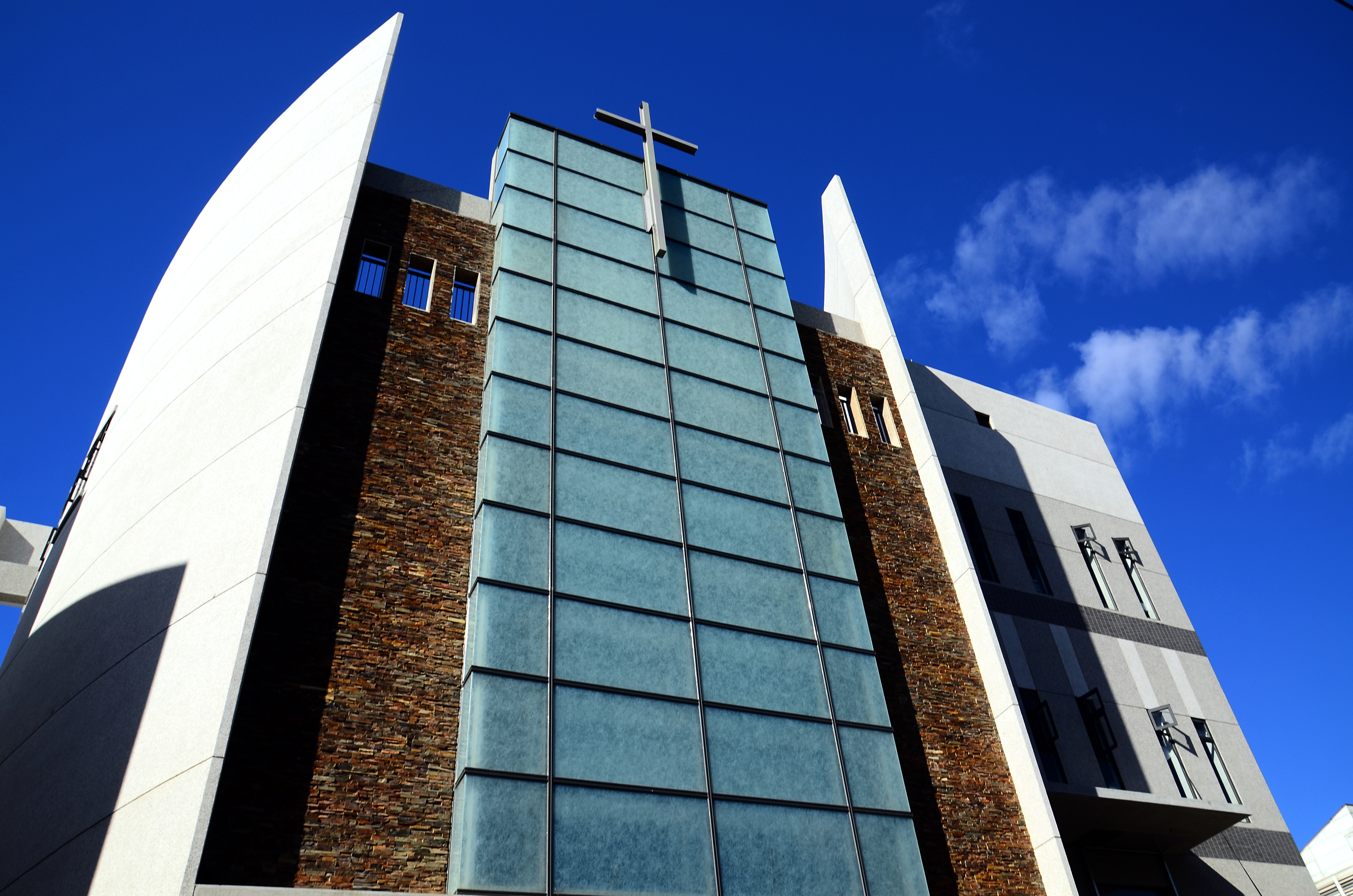
Hualien City Boai Baptist Church.

In October 1936, a resolution was passed during the centenary celebrations of the Baptist mission in China to engage in the extension of work to the frontier regions, which then included Taiwan which was a part of Japan. With the retrocession of Taiwan to China following the surrender of Japan in 1945, plans were made to expand the mission to Taiwan. A visit was made by a Shanghai missionary, Lila Florence Watson, in February 1948.

In 1948, Yang Mei Chai (楊美齋) from the National Baptist Convention of China was sent to Taiwan to establish a frontier mission in June of the same year. Yang was also appointed the head of the Taiwan district of the national convention. Bertha Smith of the American International Mission Board in Shantung arrived in Taiwan on October 19, 1948 and the first church was inaugurated on December 26 of the same year.

In the 1950s, the CBC saw an influx of missionaries and refugees from the mainland. This led to the rapid growth of the church particularly in the Mandarin language ministry with significant support from the International Mission Board in the United States. The first Taiwanese Hokkien service was conducted in at the Amoy Street Baptist Church (廈門街浸信會). In February 1957, the first Taiwanese congregation was established as the Mu Yi Church (慕義堂).

Work among the Hakkas began in 1958 in Miaoli and further work was planted in Pingtung. Work began with the aboriginal peoples of Taiwan as early as 1952 in Liouguei District, Kaohsiung with the establishment of the Liouguei Baptist Church (六龜浸信會). Work in languages apart from Mandarin was however generally slow due to the lack of standard materials and work among the aboriginal people was not significant until the first Ami pastor graduated from the Taiwan Baptist Theological Seminary in 1982.

From the period of 1948 to 1954, a total of 11 churches and 22 outreach points had been established by Baptist missionaries and workers. On July 5, 1954, the Taiwan Baptist Convention (台灣浸信會聯) was established. It was later renamed the Chinese Baptist Church, Taiwan Province Convention and the Chinese Baptist Church, Taiwan Convention before assuming its current name in 1972.

Similar to Baptist churches elsewhere, churches affiliated with the CBC are autonomous and self-governed and the CBC doesn't exercise any executive authority. The CBC's role is primarily in the coordination of work among the associated churches and the management of inter-church institutions.

According to a census published by the association in 2023, it claimed 252 churches and 24,019 members.

== Taiwan Baptist Theological Seminary ==
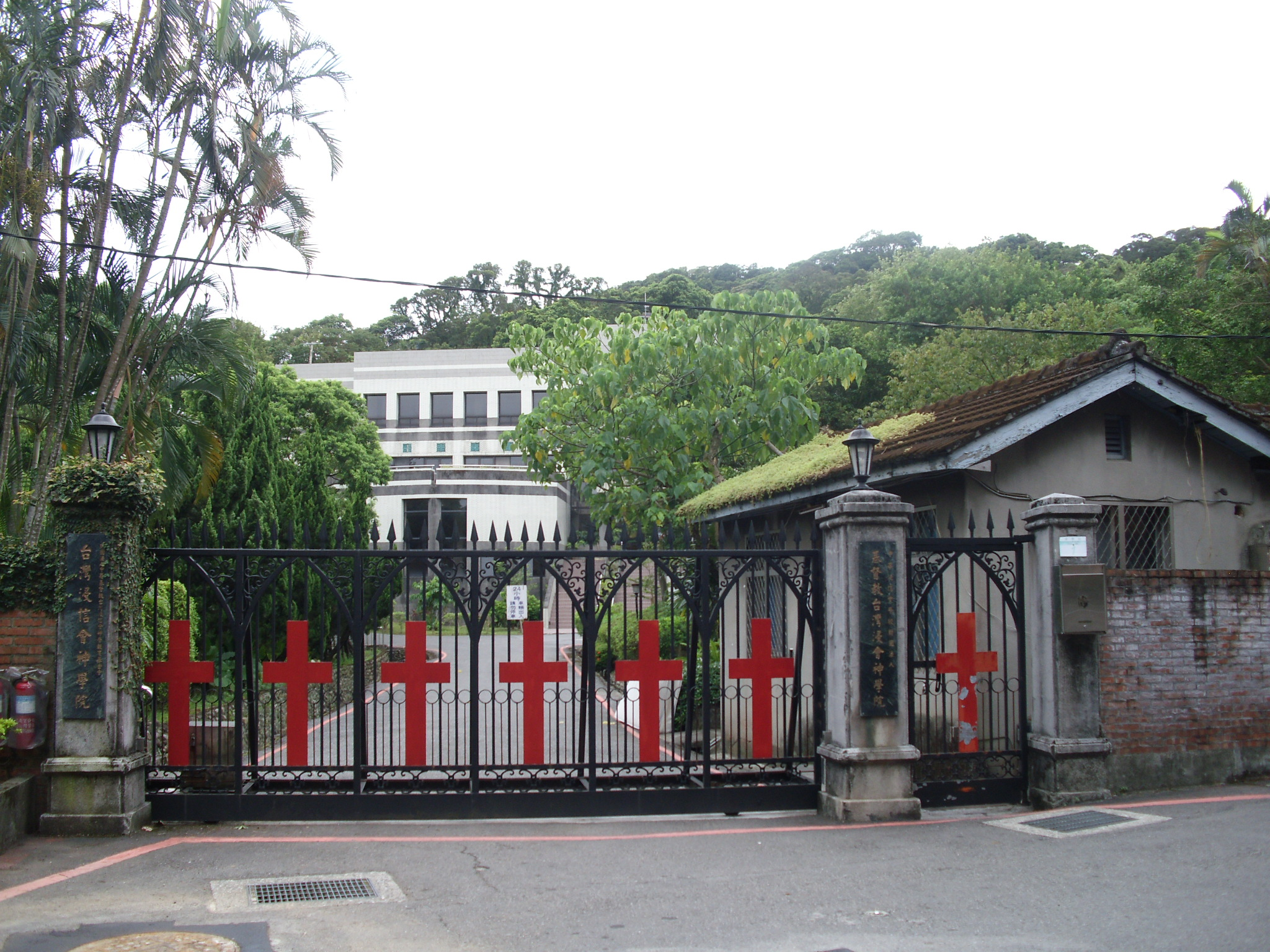
Taiwan Baptist Theological Seminary in Taipei.

The seminary was established in 1952 for the training of national workers. Until recently the seminary had faced problems from the authorities as it was an unrecognized institution and had faced accusations of awarding fraudulent academic degrees in the past. In 2005, the Legislative Yuan passed a resolution to provide for the framework of recognition of religious academic institutions and seminaries allowing the seminary to initiate the procedure of gaining full recognition from the authorities.

== Beliefs ==
The Convention has a Baptist confession of faith, and is a member of the Baptist World Alliance and the Asia Pacific Baptist Federation.

== See also ==
- Chow Lien-hwa
- Christianity in Taiwan
- Christianity in China
- Asia Pacific Baptist Federation
- Baptist World Alliance
