= Kao Chun-ming =

Taiwanese Presbyterian minister and activist

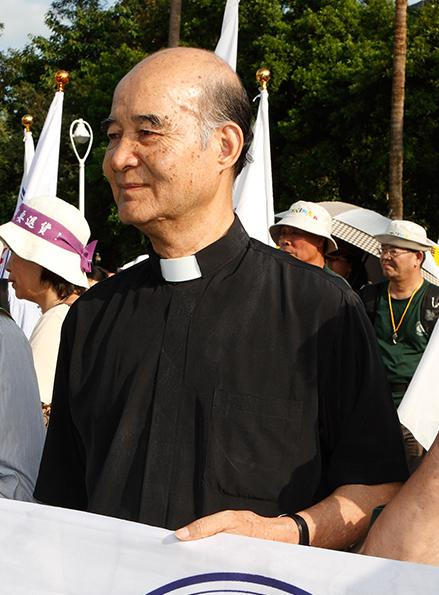
- Native name: 高俊明

Personal details
- Born: 6 June 1929 Tainan, Taiwan, Empire of Japan
- Died: 14 February 2019 (aged 89)
- Education: Tainan Theological College and Seminary; Selly Oak Colleges

Kao Chun-ming (Chinese: 高俊明; Pe̍h-ōe-jī: Ko Chùn-bêng; 6 June 1929 in Tainan – 14 February 2019) was a minister of the Presbyterian Church in Taiwan (PCT). He graduated from Tainan Theological College and Seminary, and then studied at Selly Oak Colleges in England. He was the General Secretary of the PCT from 1970 to 1989, during which period he became a political prisoner for assisting participants in the Kaohsiung Incident (1979), in particular Shih Ming-teh. For this he was sentenced for seven years in prison, and served his sentence from 1980 to 1984. While he was in prison, his wife Ruth Kao organized groups to help him and raised awareness in the worldwide Church about the human rights situation in Taiwan. After Chen Shui-bian was elected President in 2000, Kao Chun-ming was appointed a Senior Advisor to the Office of the President. In 2006 he supported the then-president Chen against his former comrade Shih, who led a movement for a forced resignation of Chen called ‘Million Voices Against Corruption, President Chen Must Go’.
