= Tainan Theological College and Seminary =

Presbyterian seminary in Taiwan

- 台南神學院
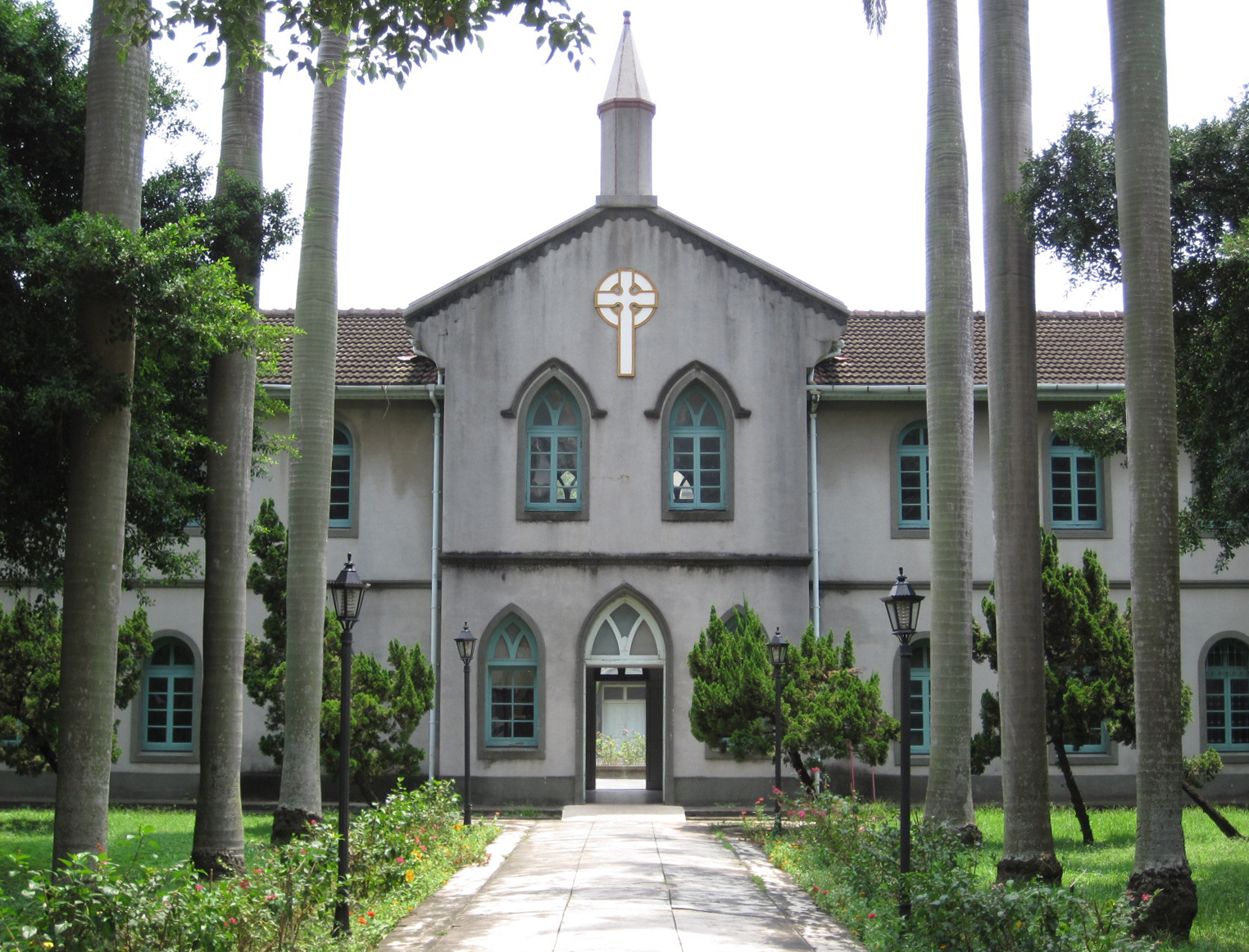
- The main college building, constructed in 1903
- Established: 1876
- Religious affiliation: Presbyterian
- Location: 117 Dongmen Road Section 1, Tainan, Taiwan; 22°59′19″N 120°12′50″E
- Website: http://www.ttcs.org.tw/

Tainan Theological College and Seminary (TTCS; Chinese: 台南神學院; pinyin: Táinán shénxué yuàn) is a private Presbyterian educational institution in Tainan, Taiwan. It is one of three Presbyterian Church in Taiwan (PCT) theological schools that trains students for ministry in the PCT, along with Taiwan Seminary and Central Taiwan Theological College and Seminary.

Tainan Seminary is one of several PCT institutions in Tainan, along with a middle school, girls' school, Chang-Jung Christian University, and Sin-Lau Hospital.

== History ==
Founded in 1876 in Taiwan Prefecture by Thomas Barclay, a missionary from Scotland, who served as its first principal until he retired in 1925. The institution was closed in 1940 under the Japanese Imperial government, but reopened in 1949 with Shoki Coe as its principal. In the modern period, under several principals (Shoki Coe, C.S. Song, and Loh I-to), Tainan Seminary has become famous for its contextual theology.

Tainan Theological College and Seminary as of early 2020 has twelve full-time faculty members. The school offers degrees in divinity (M.Div., D.Min.), theology, church music, and social work, as well as continuing education programs for clergy and lay members.

== Former principals ==
- Thomas Barclay (1875–1925)
- W. E. Montgomery (1925–1940)
- Shoki Coe (1949–1965), formerly the director of the Theological Education Fund of the World Council of Churches
- C. S. Song (1965–1970)
- Loh I-to (1995–2002), an honorary fellow of the Centre for the Study of Christianity in Asia, Trinity Theological College, Singapore

== Notable faculty/alumni ==
- Kao Chun-ming, presbyterian
- Wang Hsien-Chih (Chinese: 王憲治; pinyin: Wáng Xiànzhì; 1941–1996), Professor of Theology
