= Presbyterian Church in Taiwan =

Largest Protestant Christian denomination in Taiwan

- Tâi-oân Ki-tok Tiúⁿ-ló Kàu-hōe 台灣基督長老教會
- Abbreviation: PCT
- Classification: Mainline Protestant
- Orientation: Presbyterian
- Scripture: Protestant Bible
- Theology: Reformed
- Polity: Presbyterian
- Governance: General Assembly
- Moderator: Rev. Ti Sik-khim
- Associations: World Council of Churches; Christian Conference of Asia; National Council of Churches of Taiwan; World Communion of Reformed Churches; Council for World Mission
- Region: Taiwan
- Founder: James Laidlaw Maxwell; George Leslie Mackay
- Origin: 1865; Taiwan
- Congregations: 1,219
- Members: 238,372
- Ministers: 1,205
- Hospitals: 3
- Secondary schools: 3
- Tertiary institutions: 2
- Seminaries: 4
- Publications: Taiwan Church News
- Official website: www.pct.org.tw
- Slogan: 焚而不燬 "Burning, but not destroyed"

The Presbyterian Church in Taiwan (PCT; Chinese: 台灣基督長老教會; Pe̍h-ōe-jī: Tâi-oân Ki-tok Tiúⁿ-ló Kàu-hōe) is the largest Protestant Christian denomination based in Taiwan.

The PCT is a member of the World Council of Churches, and its flag features a "burning bush", which signifies the concept of burning yet not being destroyed.

== History ==
The Presbyterian Church in Taiwan was started in the 19th century by James Laidlaw Maxwell of the Presbyterian Church of England in Southern Taiwan, and George Leslie Mackay of the Presbyterian Church in Canada in Northern Taiwan.

In Taiwan, Presbyterians have historically been active in promoting the use of the local vernacular Taiwanese, both during the Japanese colonial period, as well as after the transfer of sovereignty to the Republic of China (ROC), during which the exclusive use of Mandarin was legally mandated.

Also, the church has historically been an active proponent of human rights and democracy in Taiwan, a tradition which began during the Japanese colonial period and extended into the "White Terror" period of the ROC.

=== Pre-1945 ===
When Maxwell and Mackay arrived in Taiwan, Taiwan was under the control of the Qing dynasty from the mainland of China. In the beginning, the Taiwanese mission works were not smooth, but the missionaries persevered and continued their works.

In 1895, as a result of Chinese defeat in the First Sino-Japanese War, Taiwan was taken over by Japan, and the Japanese colonial period started. The PCT continued their mission work during the Japanese colonial period and dedicated themselves to the human rights of the Taiwanese people under colonization.

The Presbyterian Church has been heavily involved in evangelization among the indigenous since the 1930s. Today, about 30 percent of the native Taiwanese belong to the denomination.

=== Post-1945 ===
After the end of World War II in 1945, the Kuomintang (KMT) party, which controlled the Chinese government at that time, took over Taiwan. However, after the loss in the Chinese Civil War, the KMT retreated to Taiwan in 1949. By then, the churches in Taiwan were starting to experience conflicts due to linguistic and cultural differences.

The most rapid church growth was experienced from 1955 to 1965 during the Double Church Movement. From 1978, the denomination was engaged in an extensive evangelization effort known as the "Ten plus One Movement", aimed at 10% increase of the communicant membership each year.

During the martial law period, the Church was monitored by KMT authorities. This came to light during Taiwan’s transitional justice process.

== Political involvement ==
=== Conflicts with the KMT government for WCC membership ===
The Kuomintang government forced the Presbyterian Church in Taiwan to withdraw from the World Council of Churches in 1970, as the WCC began supporting China's admission to the United Nations, and admitted Chinese religious organizations to its ranks. The WCC, which is more liberal and left-wing on many issues, was condemned by the KMT as a supporter of communism, thus standing on the same side with the Chinese Communist Party (CCP).

Therefore, the KMT strongly urged the PCT to withdraw from WCC membership, which the PCT rejected at first, but gave in later to political pressure. However, because of the PCT’s ongoing disobedience to the KMT government, the PCT was still condemned as disloyal to the country even after they left the WCC.

=== Three important statements ===
The fate of Taiwan dramatically changed in the 1970s because of the gradually global recognition of the People’s Republic of China (PRC), which was under the CCP's control. The KMT government in Taiwan felt extreme pressure, especially when the PRC replaced the ROC as the representative of China in the United Nations in 1971. Considering the global situation and diplomatic challenges, the PCT between 1971-1977 released three important documents in PCT history.

Led by then General Secretary Kao Chun-ming, the PCT released the Statement of Our National Fate by the Presbyterian Church in Taiwan in 1971, which asked the KMT government to give Taiwanese people the rights to decide their own future. Reverend Daniel Beeby was expelled from Taiwan in 1972 due to his support of Taiwan independence.

Following the confiscation of the church's Hoklo materials in 1975, the PCT published a second statement, which stressed the importance of religious freedom. The statement is called Our Appeal by the Presbyterian Church in Taiwan – Concerning the Bible, the Church and the Nation, in which the PCT proposed five (5) ways that the PCT could help the government in that time.

The PCT did not formally advocate for the Taiwan independence movement until a third statement was released in August 1977, A Declaration on Human Rights by the Presbyterian Church in Taiwan. It asked the KMT government to declare Taiwan as a novel and independent country. These three documents brought much tension between the PCT and the KMT government, but at the same time they also reflected the PCT’s deep involvement in Taiwanese society beyond the religious community.

=== Taiwanese democracy movement ===
Since the 1980s, the church formed strong ties with the Tangwai movement and Democratic Progressive Party (DPP). Although the PCT was never officially involved in the Taiwanese democracy movement by the name of the church, many of its members and clergy dedicated their lives to it.

Reverend Kao was one of the most prominent figures of the movement. He was imprisoned in 1979 for assisting the leader of the Meilidao movement, Shih Ming-teh. At the same time, Elder Lin Wen-cheng was also arrested because of her involvement during the process of Shih’s hiding from the KMT government. The Meilidao movement is considered one of the most important events in the history of the Taiwanese democracy movement.

=== After martial law ===
In 1987, the KMT government finally ended the 38-year-long martial law and Taiwanese society entered a time of democratization. Even after the democratization of Taiwan, the PCT is still deeply involved in social movements, including human rights and other issues, and continues to play a significant role in Taiwanese society.

=== Indigenous rights ===
The PCT has also been a consistent and conspicuous proponent of indigenous rights:

… over 64 percent [of Taiwanese aborigines] identify as Christian… [For decades, the PCT] has used its organizational strengths to mobilize its people for repeated campaigns, and has provided a continuing solid institutional base for most Aboriginal political initiatives …organizations like the Alliance of Taiwanese Aborigines – and even the DPP itself – have often fallen back on the Church as a ready-made resource. (Stainton 2002)

== Governance ==
In terms of governance, the PCT has a general assembly, and only one synod (the Northern Synod); the presbyteries connect directly to the general assembly. It has 23 presbyteries and four districts. In the Presbyterian Church in Taiwan, session is composed of the pastor and elders. Elders must have served two terms as deacon before becoming elders.

== Creeds ==
The church subscribes to:

- Apostles Creed
- Heidelberg Catechism
- Nicene Creed
- Westminster Confession of Faith

== Announcements & Declarations ==
- Statement of Our National Fate by the Presbyterian Church in Taiwan (12.29.1971)
- Our Appeal by the Presbyterian Church in Taiwan-Concerning the Bible, the Church and the Nation(11.18.1975)
- A Declaration on Human Rights by the Presbyterian Church in Taiwan (08.16.1977)
- Recommendations from the Presbyterian Church in Taiwan- Concerning the Present Situation (05.15.1990)
- The Presbyterian Church in Taiwan-A Public Statement on the Sovereignty of Taiwan (08.20.1991)

== Interchurch relations ==
The PCT is a member church of the World Council of Churches and the World Communion of Reformed Churches. It is also a member of the Council for World Mission through which it is linked in mission with 30 other churches around the world.

Immigrants from Taiwan to the United States and Canada have also started Taiwanese Hokkien churches which are closely related to the Presbyterian Church in Taiwan. While most of these churches are affiliated with the Presbyterian Church in the United States of America, the Presbyterian Church in Canada, and the United Church of Canada, the liturgy and church practices are rooted in the Taiwanese Presbyterian tradition, and the pulpits are usually filled by ministers trained in the PCT.

== Affiliated Institutions ==
The Presbyterian Church in Taiwan has a number of affiliated institutions.

=== Education ===
Universities and colleges include Aletheia University, Chang Jung Christian University, Mackay Medical College, and Mackay Junior College of Medicine, Nursing and Management.

The PCT has three theological institutions: the Taiwan Theological College and Seminary in Taipei (also known as Taiwan Graduate School of Theology), the Tainan Theological College and Seminary in Tainan, and the Yu-Shan Theological College and Seminary in Hualien. Secondary schools include the Tamkang Middle and High Schools and the related Suntek Elementary School in Tamsui, as well as the Changjung High School and Changjung Girls' Senior High School in Tainan.

=== Hospitals ===
The Mackay Memorial Hospital, Changhua Christian Hospital and Sin-Lau Hospital are affiliated with the Presbyterian Church in Taiwan.

=== Media ===
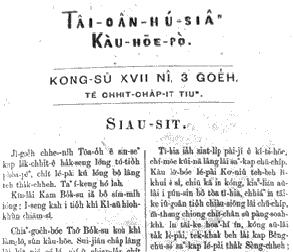
An issue of the Taiwan Church News, first published by Presbyterian missionaries in 1885. This was the first printed newspaper in Taiwan, and was written in Taiwanese, in a Latin alphabet.

In 1885, the PCT published the printed newspaper in Taiwanese history, the Taiwan Church News (which was first called Taiwan Prefecture City Church News).

In 2004, the PCT established News Eyes Television, which aims to serve the Christians in Taiwan and abroad. At the same time, News Eyes Television also visions to be an anchor in global mission works.

== See also ==
- Reformed churches
- History of Taiwan
