= Religion in Taiwan =

Religion in Taiwan by self-identified affiliation (Pew Research Center 2023)
1. Buddhism (28%)
2. No religion (27%)
3. Taoism (24%)
4. Christianity (7%)
5. Other religions (12%)
6. Don't know (2%)
Religion in Taiwan (2021 estimate)
1. Folk beliefs (Note: It is a syncretism between Taoism, Buddhism, philosophies such as Confucianism, elements of Shamanism and the veneration of spirits.) (27.9%)
2. No religion (23.9%)
3. Buddhism (19.8%)
4. Taoism (18.7%)
5. Protestantism (5.50%)
6. Yiguandao (2.20%)
7. Catholicism (1.40%)
8. Other religions (0.60%)

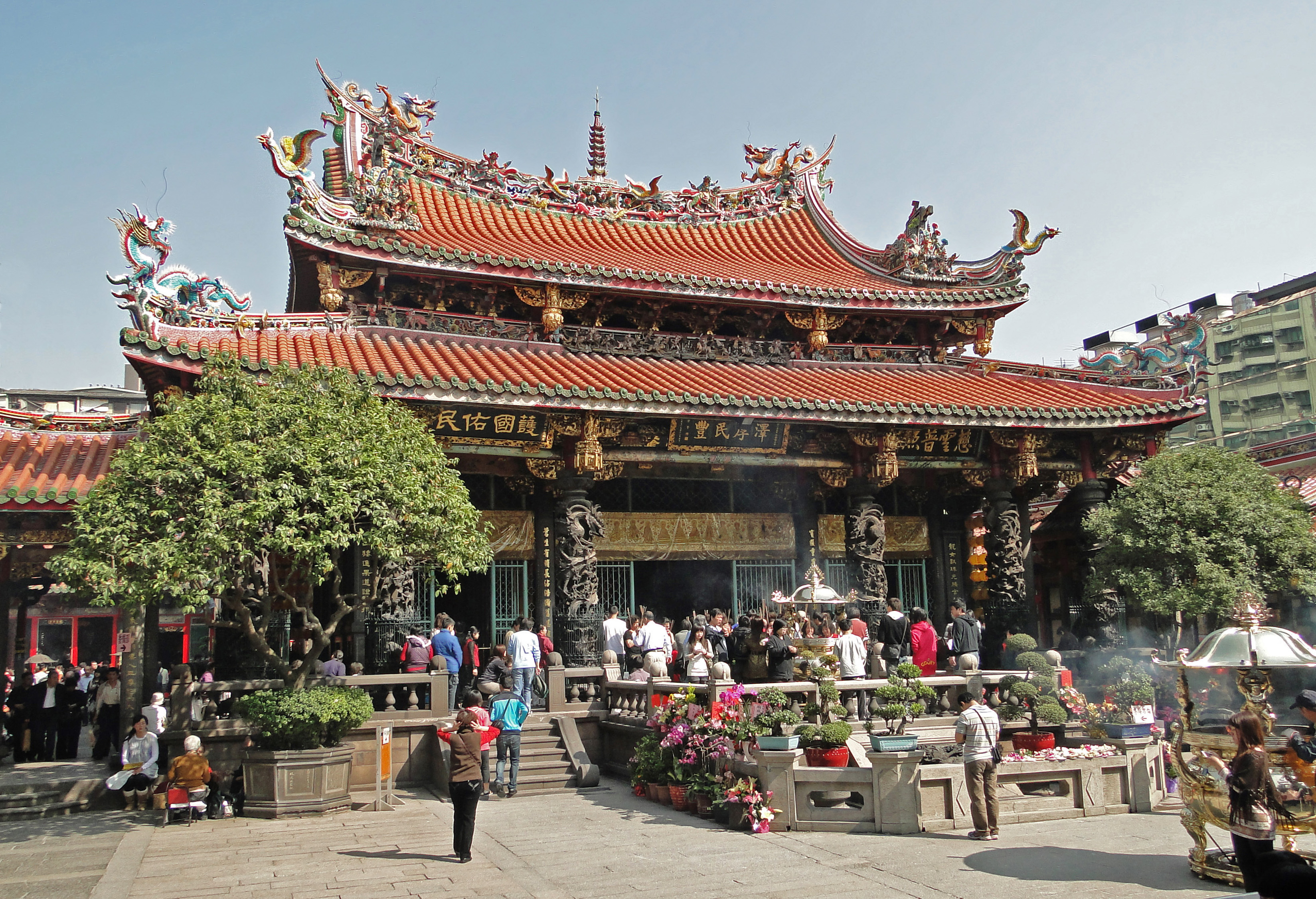
Mengjia Longshan Temple is a Chinese folk religion temple with both Buddhist and Taoist deities.

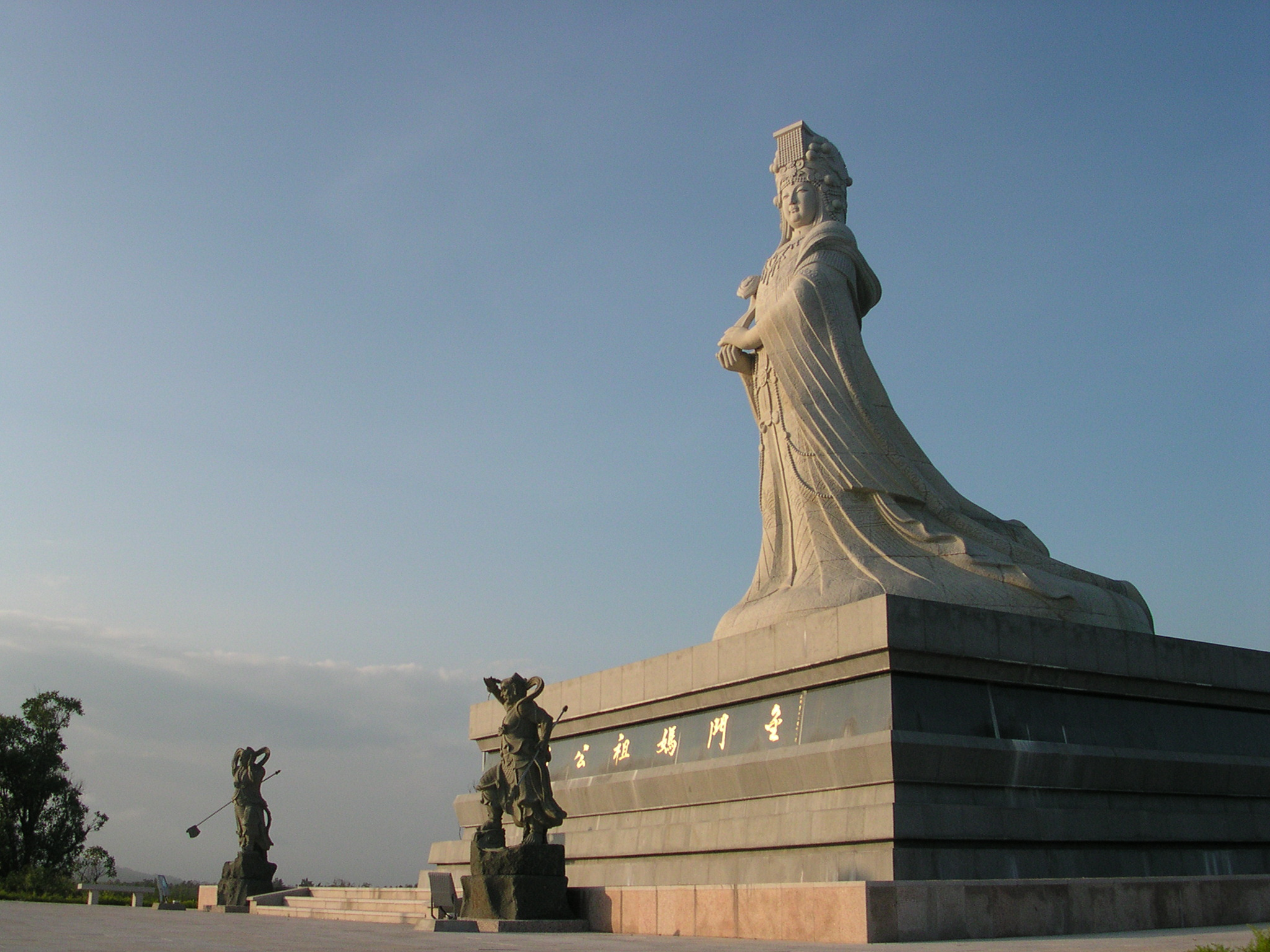
Statue of Mazu (Chinese sea goddess) in Kinmen.

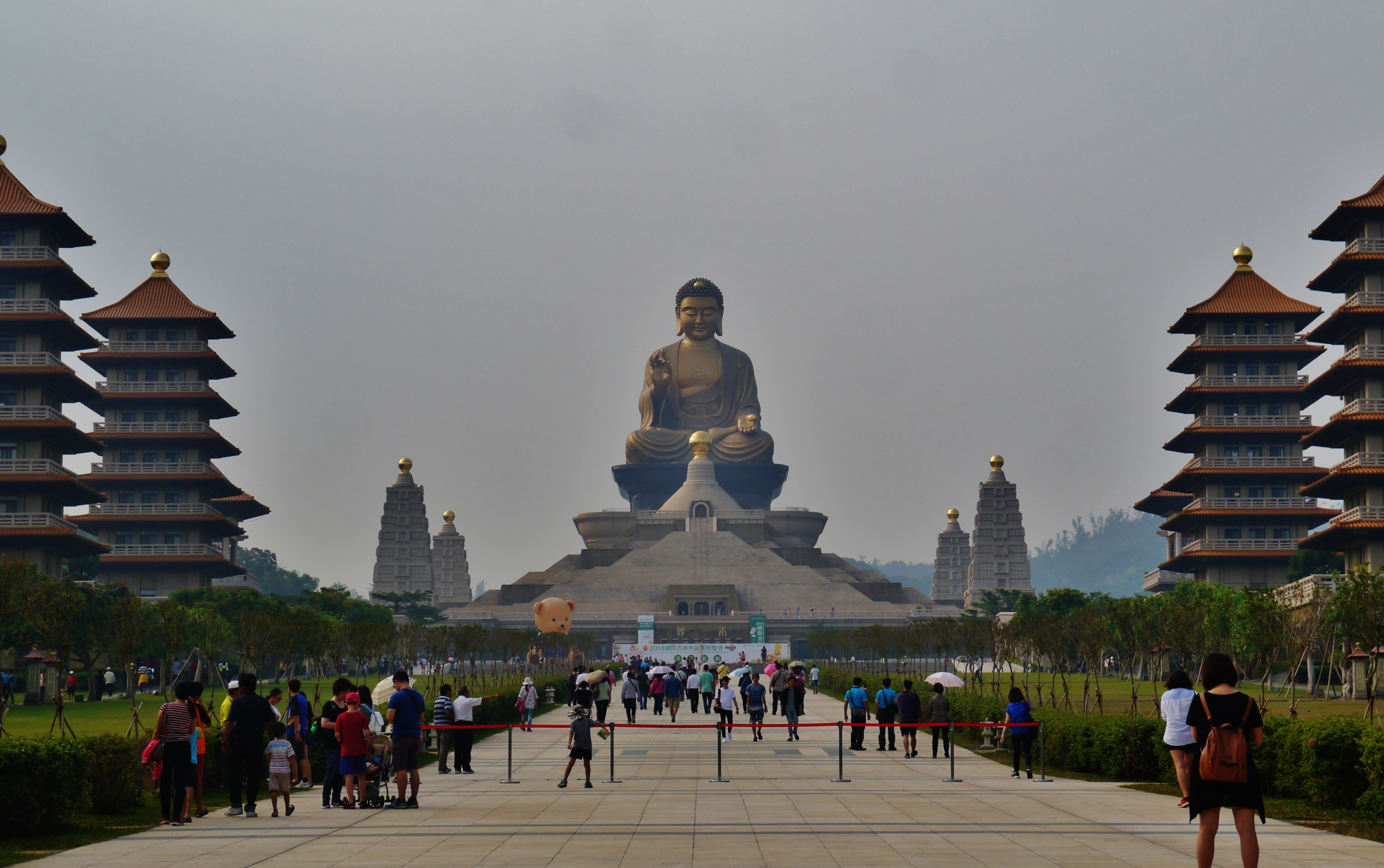
Main path at Fo Guang Shan Buddha Museum.

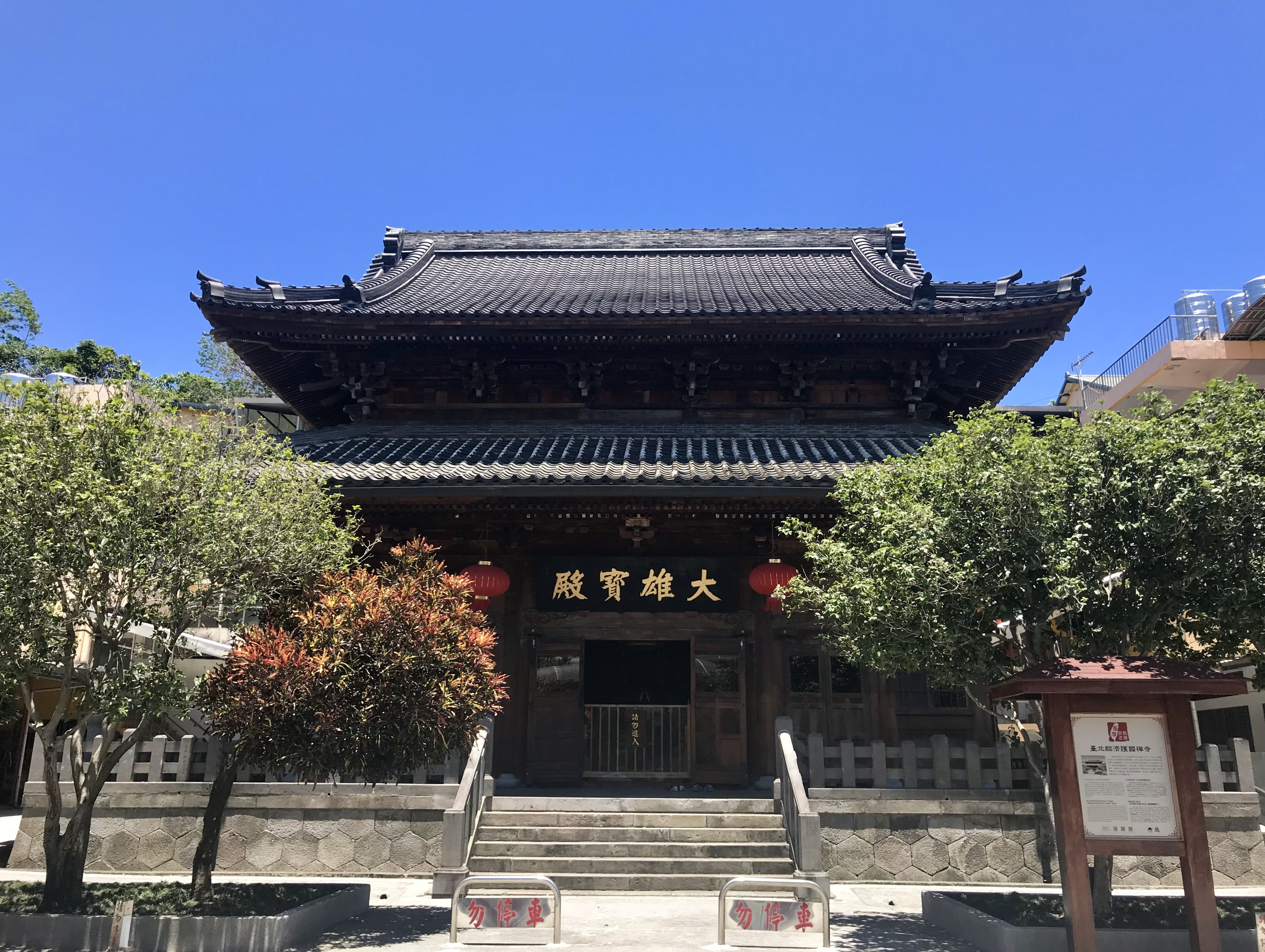
Linji Huguo Chan Temple is a Japanese Buddhist temple.

Religion in Taiwan is characterised by a diversity of religious beliefs and practices, predominantly those pertaining to the continued preservation of ancient Chinese culture and religion. Freedom of religion is enshrined in the constitution of the Republic of China (Taiwan). The majority of Taiwanese people practice a combination of Buddhism and Taoism often with a Confucian worldview, which is collectively termed as Chinese folk religion.

Many statistical analyses try to distinguish between Buddhism and Taoism in Taiwan, which, along with Confucianism, are rather aspects within broader "ancient Chinese religion". It is hard to make such distinction because various Taoist deities are worshipped alongside deities which originated in Buddhism, for instance Guanyin, in many temples across the country.

As of 2024, there were 15,206 temples and churches in Taiwan, including 9,794 Taoist and 2,273 Buddhist temples as well as 2,374 Protestant and 418 Catholic churches. In Taiwan's 36,000 square kilometers of land, there are more than 33,000 places for religious (believers) to worship and gather. Averaging almost one religious building (temple, church, etc.) for every square kilometer, Taiwan is considered to have the highest density of religious buildings, making it the "most religious" region in the area where Chinese is the majority language.

== History ==
Before the 17th century, the island of Taiwan was inhabited by indigenous peoples of Austronesian origin, as well as small settlements of Chinese and Japanese maritime traders and pirates. Taiwanese indigenous peoples traditionally practised animism. When the Dutch occupied parts of southern Taiwan in 1624, Dutch missionaries soon followed, introducing Protestantism to the indigenous communities. Following the arrival of the Spaniards in northern Taiwan two years later, Catholic missionaries from Spain also came to share their faith.

When the Han Chinese began to settle on the island and form the Taiwanese Chinese ethnic group, interfaith exchanges occurred, leading to two-way religious assimilation between the indigenous and Han communities. An example was the incorporation of Ali-zu, the Siraya god of fertility, into the Han pantheon of folk deities in some places around Taiwan.

=== 17th and 18th centuries ===
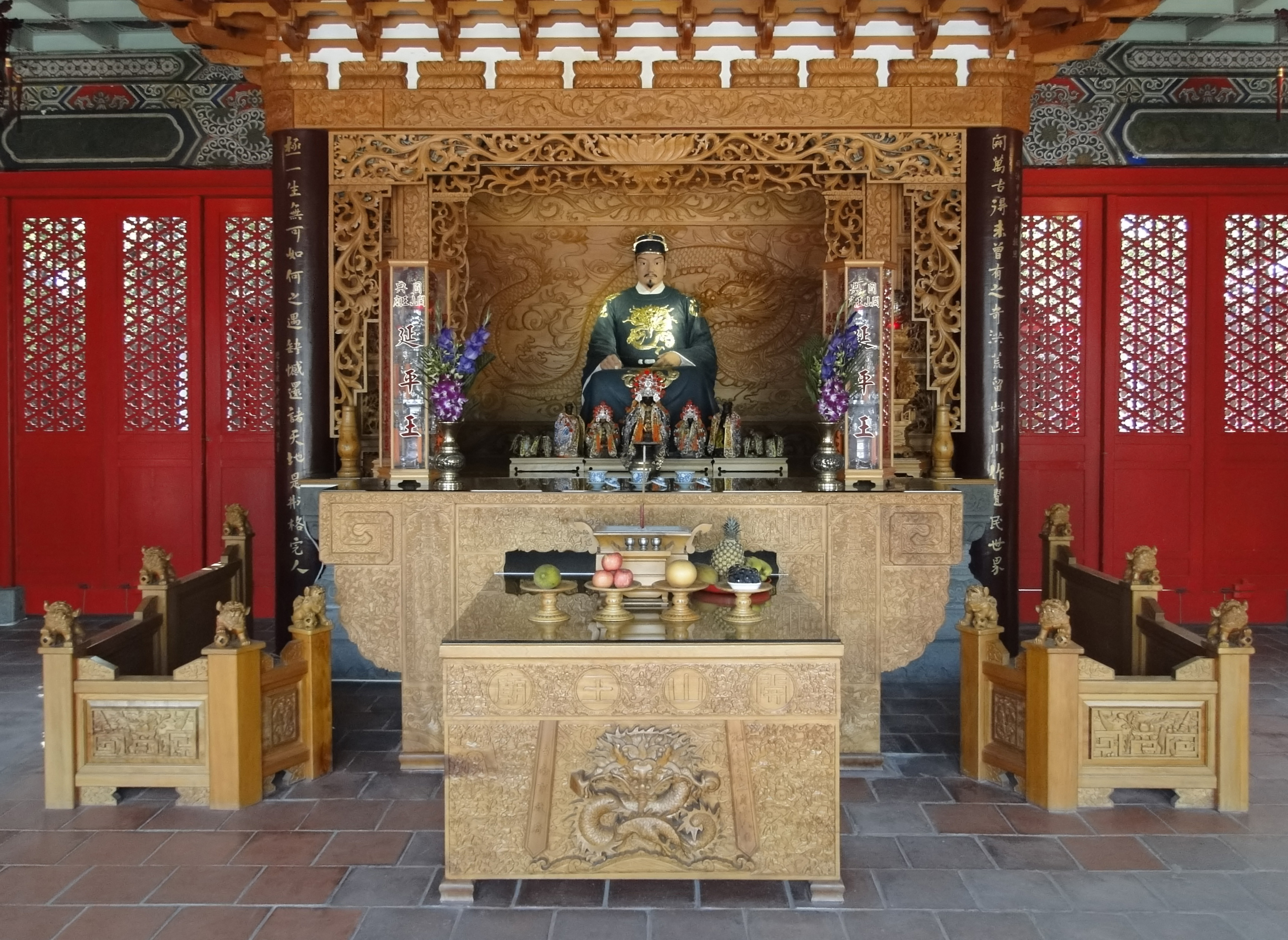
Main altar of the Shrine of Koxinga in Tainan.

A large influx of Han Chinese began in the 1660s with the transition of imperial power from the Ming dynasty to the Manchurian Qing dynasty. Many Ming loyalists fled to the south, including Zheng Chenggong alias Koxinga, a military warlord who fought against the Manchu dynasty. He sailed to Taiwan in 1661 with thousands of troops, and in a war with the Dutch, he defeated and drove out the Dutch military forces and established the Kingdom of Tungning, the first Chinese state on the island. Chinese settlers, mostly from Fujian and Guangdong, began to migrate to the island. The policy of migration to Taiwan was restrictive until 1788, even after the island came under the political control of the Qing in 1683.

Chinese migrants brought with them the Chinese traditional religions from their hometown, which served to integrate communities around the worship of Chinese Deities. As the settlers were mostly males, came from different areas, and at first not many people shared the same surnames and belonged to the same kins, ancestral shrines of kinship gods did not develop until the 1790s, when sufficient generations of families had established on the island.

The first settlers in Koxinga and Qing periods brought with them images or incense ashes from mainland temples, installed them in homes or temporary thatched huts, and later in proper temples, as economic circumstances permitted to build them. Prominent temples became the foci of religious, political and social life, often eclipsing Qing officials and state-sponsored temples in their influence.

There is little evidence that the doctrinal and initiatory religions of Buddhism and Taoism were active during this period. Taiwan, as a frontier land, was not attractive for Buddhist and Taoist religious leaders.

=== 19th century ===
During the mid-Qing dynasty, sects of popular Buddhism which the Japanese authorities would have later lumped together with the religions of fasting (zhāijiāo) because of their vegetarian precepts, began to send missionaries from the mainland to Taiwan. They were more successful in attracting converts than either pure Buddhism or Taoism. Japanese researches of the early colonial period identified zhaijiao sects as a line of the Linji school of Chan Buddhism, although contemporary scholars know that they were centered on a female creator deity, Wusheng Laomu, and identify them as branches of Luoism disguising as a form of Buddhism free of ordained clergy. Zhaijiao sects identify the sangha as the community of believers, not as a separate clergy.

Apart from zhaijiao Buddhist sects, other folk religious sects, that were mistakenly classified as Buddhist by the Japanese government, were active in Taiwan. The most prominent were the three religions of fasting: the Jinchuang, the Longhua, and Xiantiandao traditions (the latter was introduced to Taiwan in the mid-19th century).

=== 20th century—Japanese rule ===
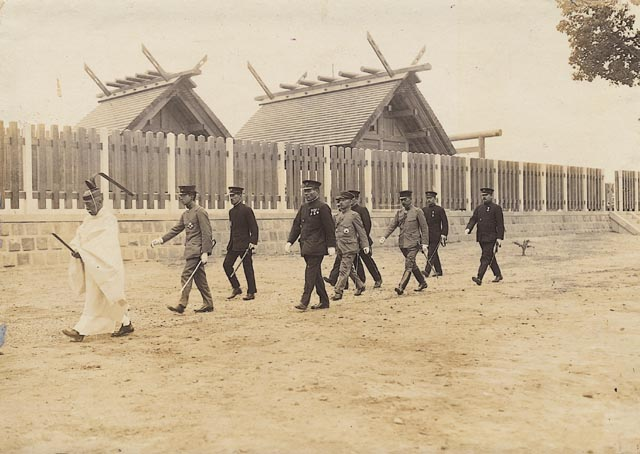
Prince Hirohito visits Tainan Shinto Shrine (1923).

In 1895, the Manchu government ceded Taiwan to Japan as part of the terms of surrender following the First Sino-Japanese War. During the fifty-one years of Japanese rule, governors enacted regulations to control the activities of "native religions". During a first period from 1895 to 1915, the Japanese adopted a laissez-faire policy towards native religions. During a second phase from 1915 to 1937, the government tried to vigorously regulate local religions. A third period, coinciding with the outbreak of hostilities between Japan and China, saw the Japanese government start a "Japanisation movement" (Japanese: 皇民化運動, Hepburn: kōminka undō) that included a "temple-restructuring movement" (寺廟整理運動, jibyō seiri undō).

During the Japanese period many indigenous groups were forced to practice Shintō, only a few (such as the Saisiyat people) were able to resist and maintain their traditions. Often this was done by convincing Japanese anthropologists to come to Taiwan and document religious traditions as legitimate cultural heritage however even the indigenous people allowed to keep some traditional ceremonies were still forced to pray at Shintō shrines.

Buddhism, as a shared heritage of China and Japan, received better treatment than Chinese folk religion and Taoism. Some Taiwanese Buddhist groups cooperated with the Japanese government, and Japanese Buddhist sects sent missionaries to Taiwan and even worked with zhaijiao Buddhist groups. The total number of Japanese Buddhist groups that were introduced to Taiwan could be categorized into 14 sects under 8 schools. However, given the profound differences between Chinese and Japanese Buddhist traditions (among others, Japanese priests marry, eat meat and drink wine, all of which Chinese monks abstain from), the "Japanisation" of Chinese Buddhism was resisted by Taiwanese Buddhist communities. During the same period, most Taiwanese Buddhist temples came to affiliate with one of four central temples, called "Four Holy Mountains" (台灣四大名山).

In 1915, Japanese religious policies in Taiwan changed after the "Xilai Hermitage incident". The hermitage was a zhaijiao Buddhist hall where the follower Yu Qingfang (余清芳) started an anti-Japanese rebellion, in which many other folk religious and Taoist sects took part. The Japanese government discovered the plot and Yu Qingfang was executed in a speedy trial together with ninety-four other followers.

After the incident, the Japanese government became suspicious of what it called Taiwan's "old religious customs" (kyūkan shūkyō). The government began to investigate, register and regulate local temples, and it created islandwide Buddhist religious associations—into which even zhaijiao Buddhist groups were enrolled—whose charters recommended loyalty to the government.

In 1937, after the Marco Polo Bridge Incident and the start of the Second Sino-Japanese War, Tokyo ordered the rapid acculturation of the peoples of Japan's colonies. This included an effort to disaccustom people from Chinese traditional religions and convert them into the nexus of State Shinto. Many Shinto shrines were established in Taiwan. Chinese family altars were replaced with kamidana and butsudan, and a Japanese calendar of religious festivals was introduced.

The subsequent "temples' restructuration movement" caused much consternation among the Han Taiwanese population and had far-reaching effects. Its inception can be traced back to the "Conference for Improving Popular Customs" held in 1936, that far from promoting a razing of temples discussed measures for a reform and standardisation of Taoist and folk temple practices.

The outbreak of open war between China and Japan in 1937 led to a proscription of practices and even stronger measures, as Japanese officials saw the religious culture centered around folk temples as the major obstacle to Japanisation. Consequently, some local officials began to close and to demolish temples, burning their images, confiscating their cash and real estates, a measure that they called "sending the gods to Heaven". In 1940, when a new governor-general took office, the "temples' restructuration movement" was halted.

The Japanese persecution of Taiwanese folk beliefs led to an increase in skepticism and loss of faith among the Taiwanese. As a result of this loss of faith in gods, Japanese police reported a general decline in public morals. The policies also resulted in the disappearance of the small Muslim community, until Islam was reintroduced by the Kuomintang with their retreat from mainland China to Taiwan after the end of Chinese Civil War in 1949.

Another effect of the Japanese colonisation on religious life in Taiwan was due to the modernisation of infrastructures. Before the 20th century the travel infrastructure of Taiwan was not very developed, and it was difficult for people to move from a part of the island to another. The Japanese quickly constructed a network of railroads connecting all regions of the island. In the field of religion, this promoted the rise in importance of some Buddhist, Taoist or folk temples as island-wide pilgrimage sites. During this time, some gods lost their local and sub-ethnic nature and became "pan-Taiwanese".

=== 1945 onwards—Republic of China rule ===
Religion of upbringing in Taiwan (Pew Research Center 2023)
1. Taoism (42%)
2. Buddhism (25%)
3. No religion (9%)
4. Christianity (5%)
5. Other religions (19%)

Tianyuanggong, a temple of Yiguandao in Tamsui, New Taipei.

In 1945, after the Second World War, the administration of Taiwan was handed over to the Republic of China through General Order No. 1. The People's Republic of China was established four years later in mainland China under the Chinese Communist Party.

In 1949, several religious leaders of mainland China including the 63rd Celestial Master of Taoism Zhang Enpu (張恩溥), and the 7th Changkya Khutukhtu, the spiritual head of Tibetan Buddhism in Inner Mongolia Lobsang Pelden Tenpe Dronme escaped to Taiwan after the Government of the Republic of China retreated to Taiwan after losing the Chinese Civil War. With Zhang Enpu the religious leadership and orthodoxy of Zhengyi Dao was brought to Taiwan. The lineage for the Celestial Master had since passed on to the 64th Celestial Master Zhang Yuanxian (張源先), who passed away in 2008. As the Republic of China government has yet to confer a new Celestial Master, there is no officially recognized 65th Celestial Master as of 2021.

The rapid economic growth of Taiwan since the 1970s and 1980s ("Taiwan Miracle") accompanied by a quick renewal of Chinese folk religion, challenging Max Weber's theories on secularisation and disenchantment, has led many scholars to investigate how folk religious culture, with its emphasis on values like loyalty, its social network of temples and gods' societies, may have contributed to the island's economic development. During the same period, folk religions developed ties with environmental causes. Chinese salvationist religions (such as earlier Xiantiandao) become increasingly popular in Taiwan after 1945, although some of them were illegal until the 1980s.

After the 1950s, and especially since the 1970s, there was a significant growth of Buddhism. Chinese Buddhism developed into distinctively new forms, with the foundation of organizations like the Tzu Chi, the Fo Guang Shan and the Dharma Drum Mountain, which follow the Humanistic Buddhism movement that was founded in mainland China during the early 20th century. Many highly realized Buddhist masters, such as Master Hsing Yun, Master Sheng-yen, Master Yin Shun, and others escaped from mainland China to Taiwan when the Government of the Republic of China retreated to Taiwan after losing the Chinese Civil War. They promoted Humanistic Buddhism reformist movement in Taiwan, which was pioneered by Master Taixu in mainland China. Tibetan Buddhism had also spread into the island. Since the 2000s, there has been an increasing cooperation between religious groups in Taiwan and mainland China which decreased tensions between them. Despite this, there are still tensions from past events, including Taiwan being removed from the United Nations by the People's Republic of China.

Adults raised with a religious identity different from their current one by Pew Research Center 2023
Religion	Religion of upbringing	Religion they now profess	Percent change
Religion	%	%	%
Taoism	42%	24%	▼ -18%
Buddhism	25%	28%	▲3%
No religion	9%	27%	▲18%
Christianity	5%	7%	▲2%
Other religions	19%	14%	▼ -5%
Population	100%	100%	

== Folk beliefs ==
Chinese traditional, popular or folk religion, or simply Chinese religion, also called Shenism, defines the collection of grassroots ethnic religious and spiritual experiences, disciplines, beliefs and practices of the Han Chinese. Another name of this complex of religions is Chinese Universism, coined by Jan Jakob Maria de Groot, and referring to Chinese religion's intrinsic metaphysical perspective.

It consists in the worship of the shen (神 "gods", "spirits", "awarenesses", "consciousnesses", "archetypes"; literally "expressions", the energies that generate things and make them thrive) which can be nature deities, city deities or tutelary deities of other human agglomerations, national deities, cultural heroes and demigods, ancestors and progenitors, deities of the kinship. Holy narratives regarding some of these gods are part of Chinese mythology.

Chinese folk religion in Taiwan is framed by the ritual ministry exerted by the Zhengyi Taoist clergy (sanju daoshi), independent orders of fashi (non-Taoist ritual masters), and tongji media. The Chinese folk religion of Taiwan has characteristic features, such as Wang Ye worship. Even though Falun Gong is banned in China, people in Taiwan are free to practise it.

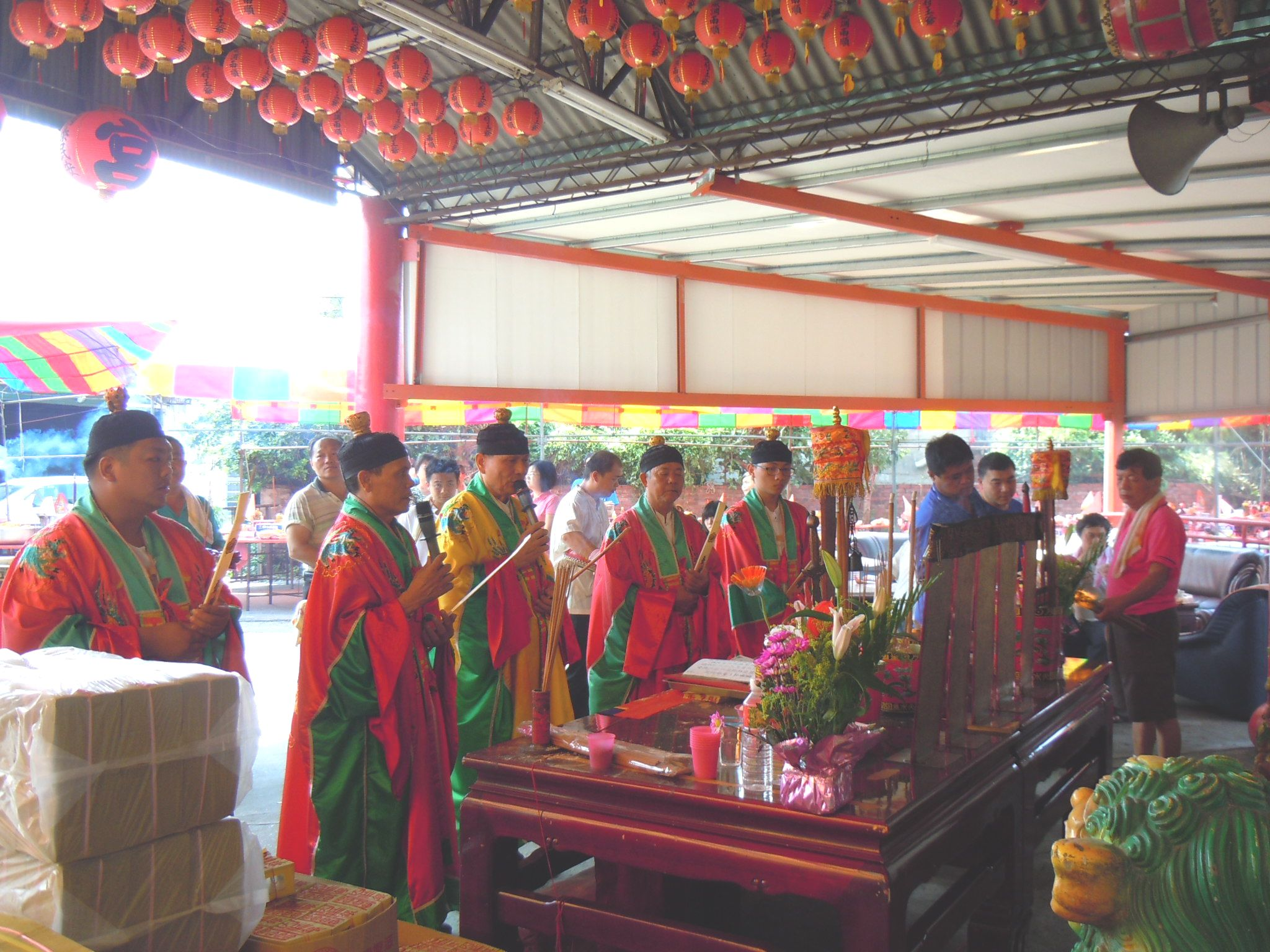
Folk Taoists officiating a ceremony in Taichung.

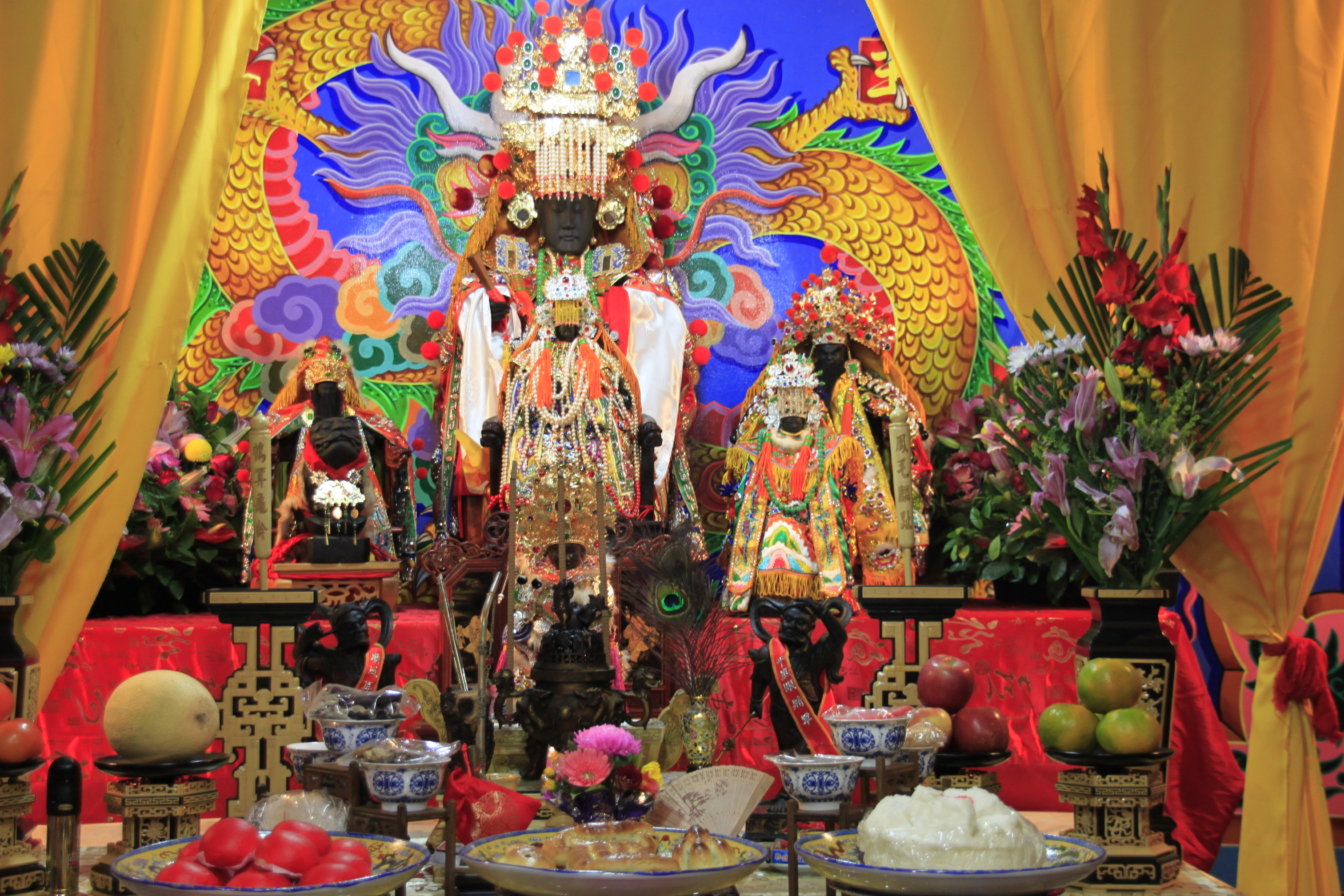
An altar dedicated to various gods at a temple in Tainan.

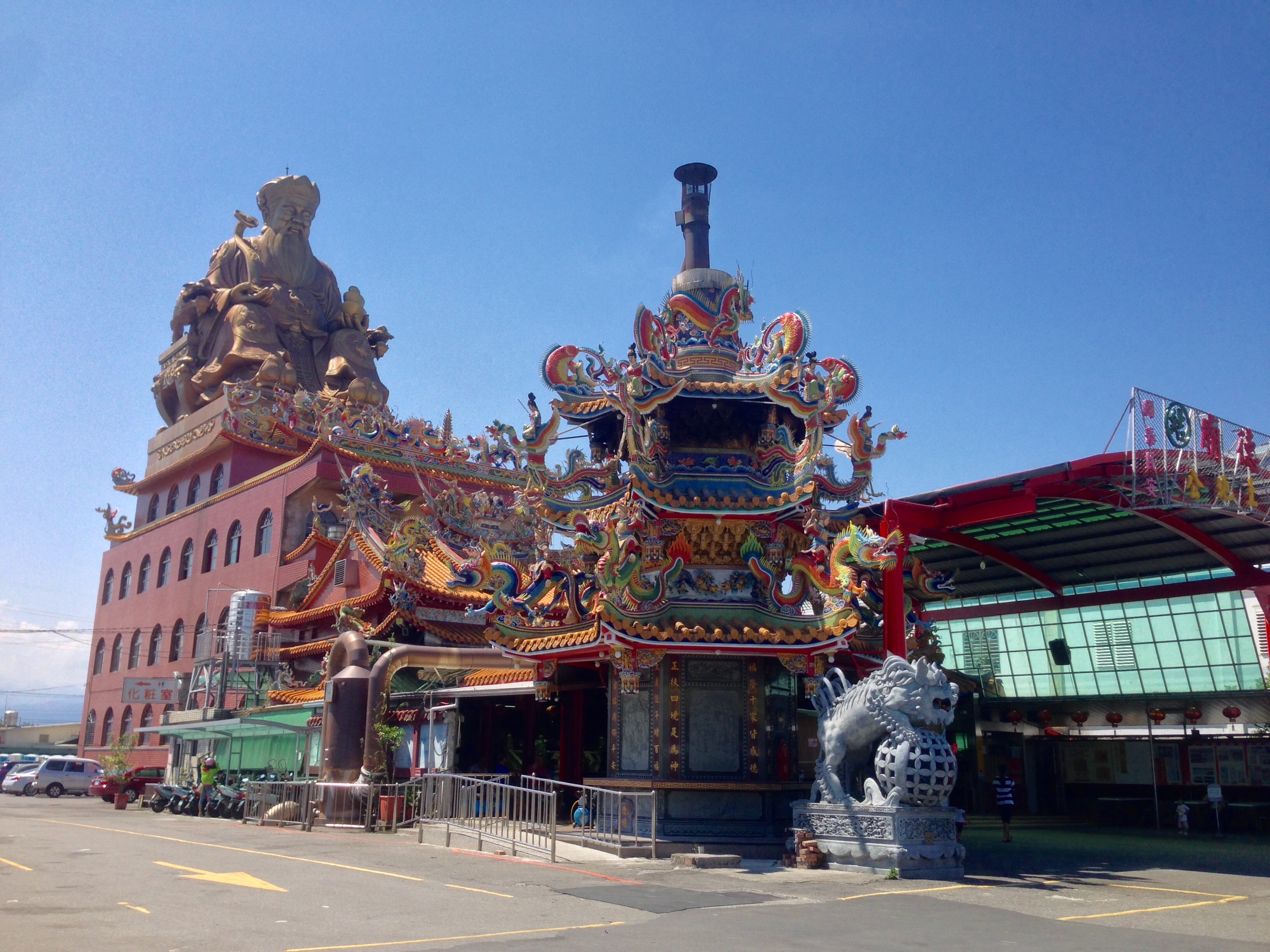
Temple of Fude in Wujie, Yilan.

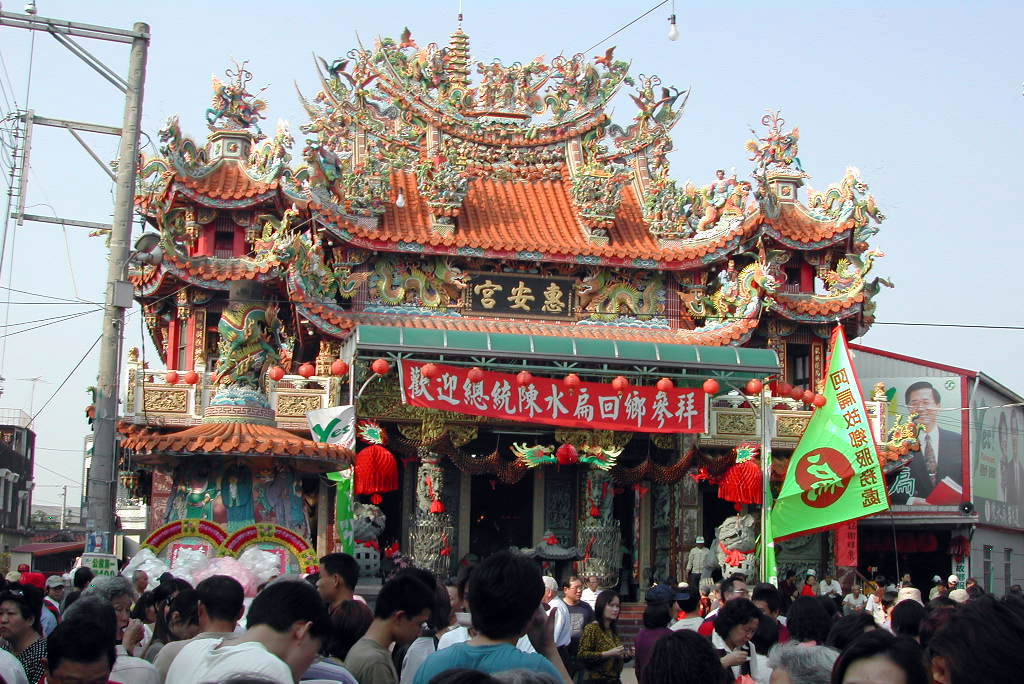
Hui'an Temple in Kuantien, Tainan. The festival welcomed politician Chen Shui-bian home after his 2004 re-election.

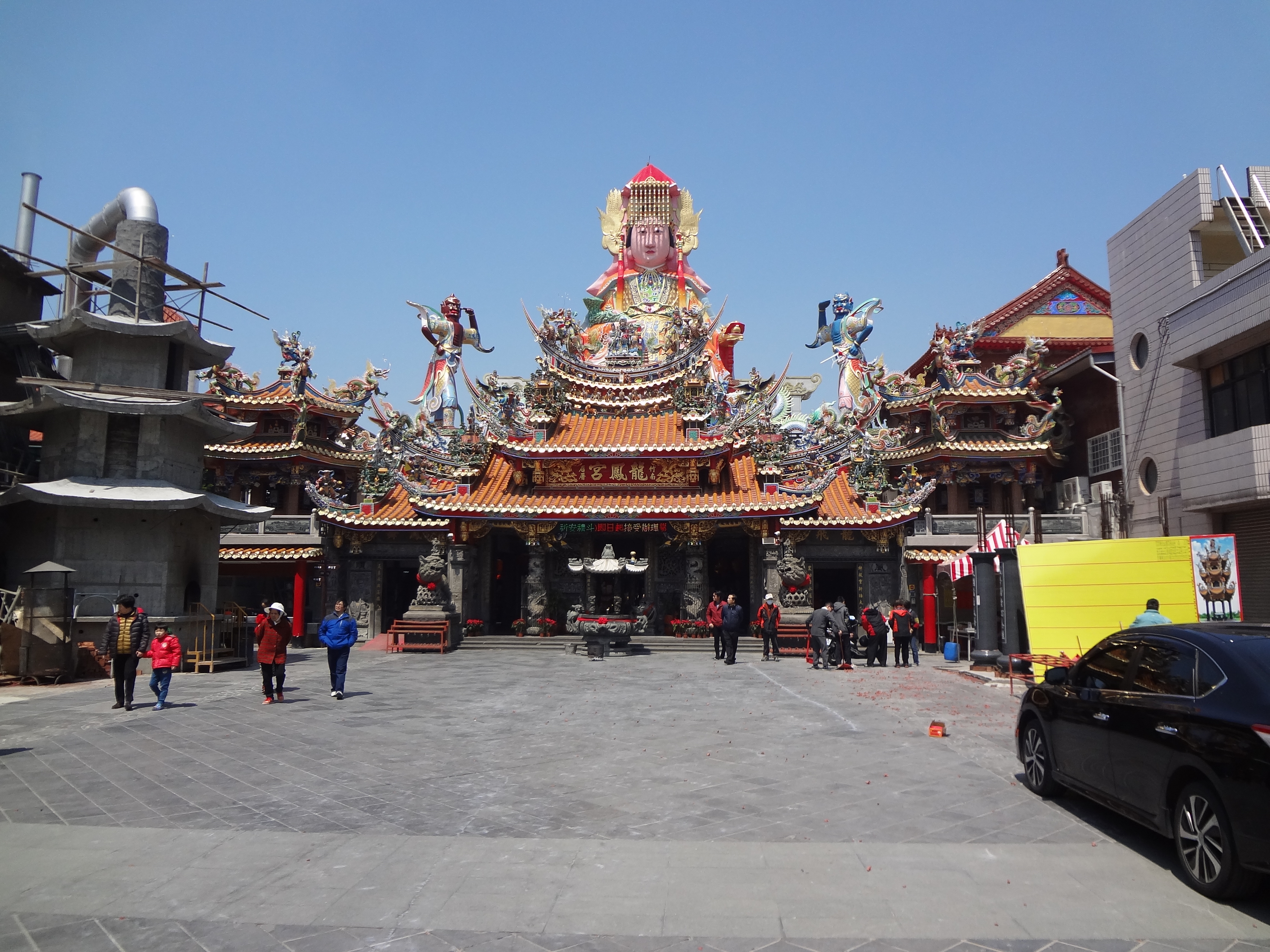
Hotsu Longfong Temple dedicated to Mazu in Miaoli.

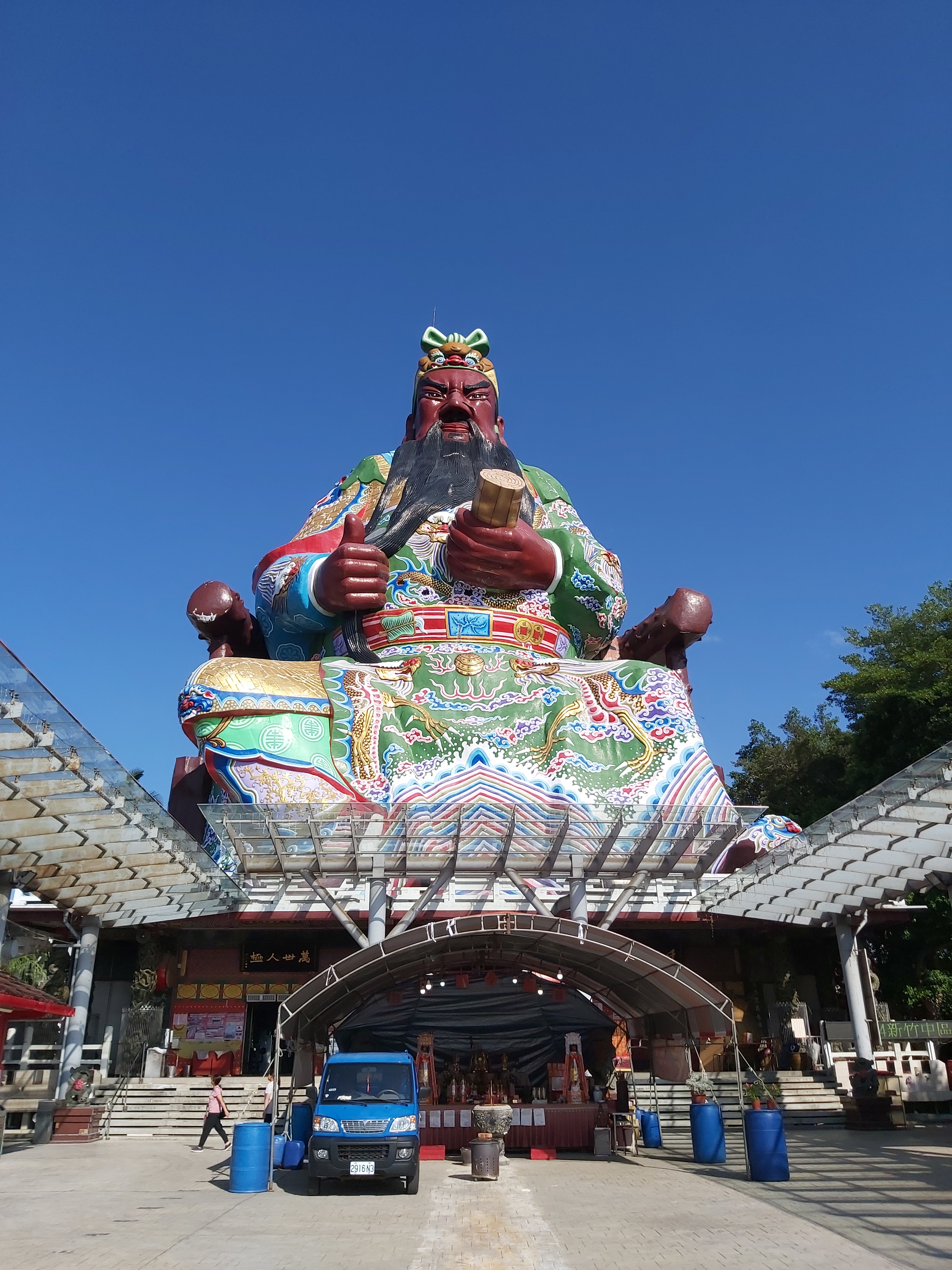
Temple of Guandi in Hsinchu.

=== Taoism and Confucianism ===
Taoism in Taiwan is almost entirely entwined with folk religion, as it is mostly of the Zhengyi school in which priests function as ritual ministers of local communities' cults. Taiwanese Taoism lacks a contemplative, ascetic and monastic tradition such as northern China's Quanzhen Taoism. The Celestial Masters, leaders of the Zhengyi school, have their seat on the island. Nowadays the office is split into at least three lines competing to head the Taoist community.

Politicians of all parties appear at Taoist temples during campaigns, using them for political gatherings. Despite this and the contention among sects for leadership, there is no unitary structure of authority overseeing all Taoists in Taiwan. According to the 2005 census, there were 7.6 million Taoists in Taiwan (33% of the population) in that year. As of 2015, there were 9,485 registered Taoist temples in Taiwan, constituting 78% of all registered temples.

Confucianism is present in Taiwan in the form of many associations and temples and shrines for the worship of Confucius and sages. In 2005, 0.7% of the population of Taiwan adhered to Xuanyuanism, which is a Confucian-based religion worshipping Huangdi as the symbol of God.

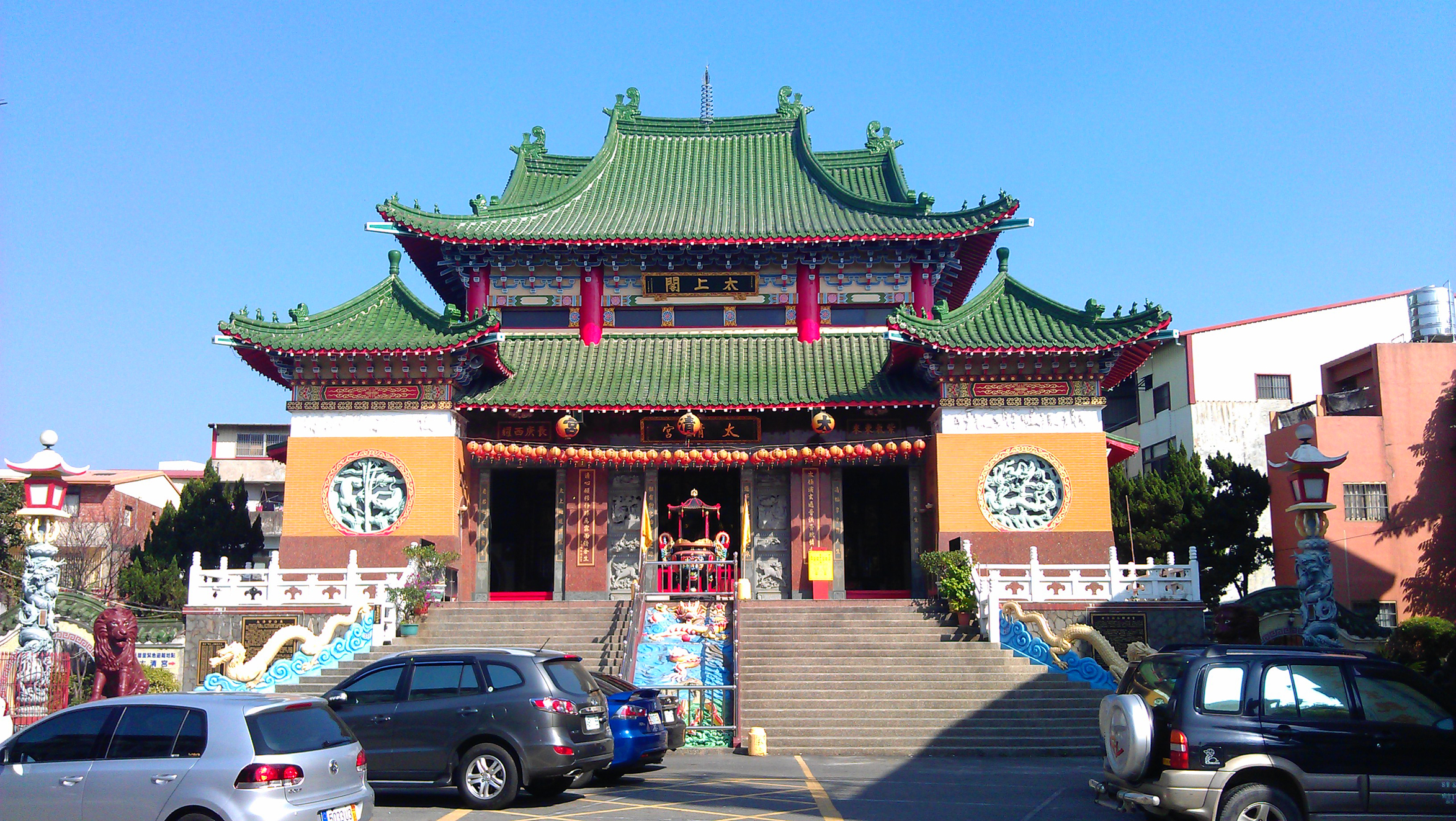
Temple of the Great Peace in Caotun, Nantou.

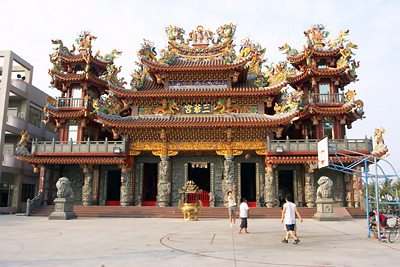
Sanye Temple in Bao-an, Tainan.

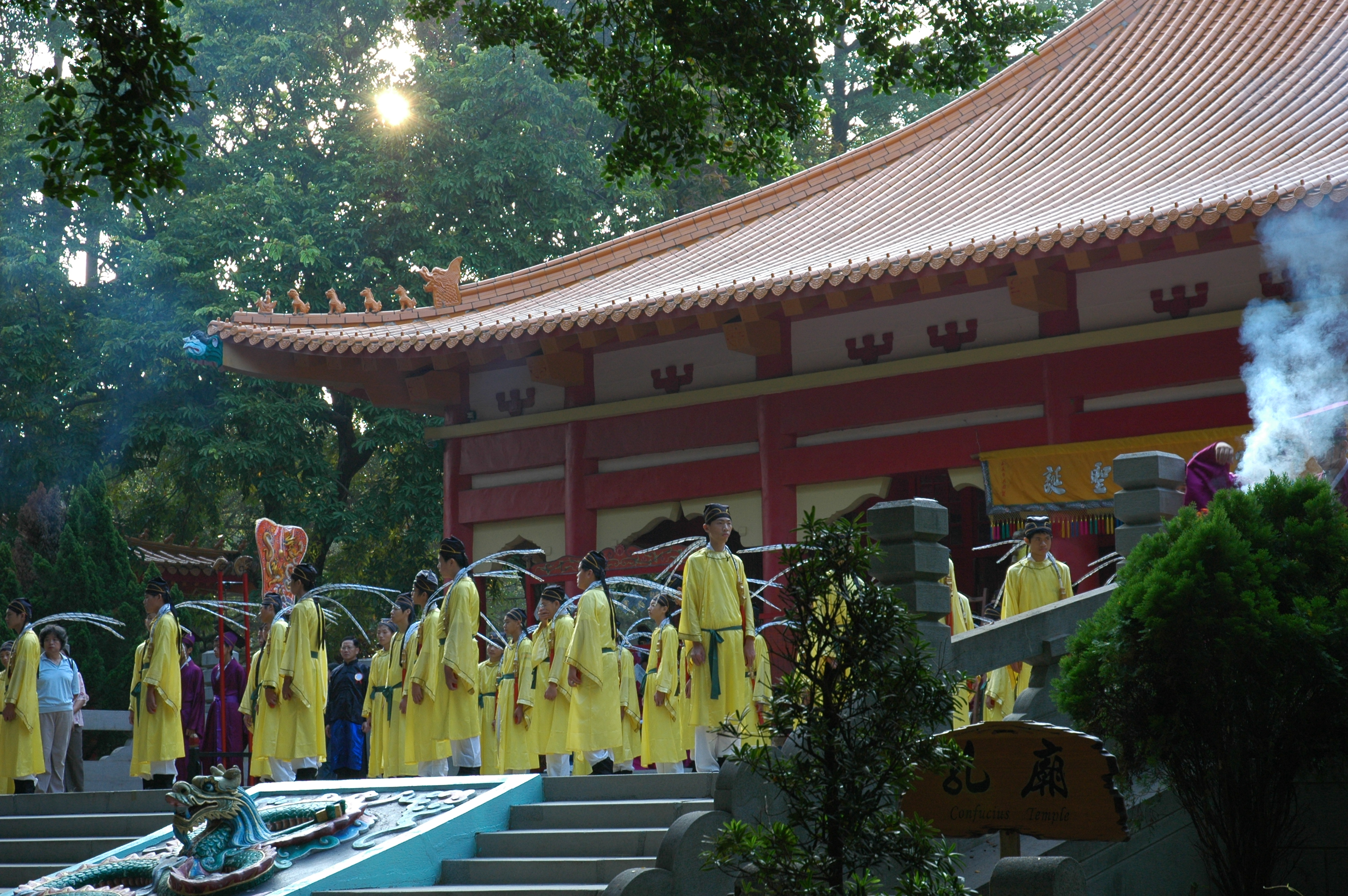
Ceremony at a Temple of Confucius in Chiayi.

=== Buddhism ===
Buddhism was introduced into Taiwan in the mid-Qing dynasty (18th century) through the zhaijiao popular sects. Several forms of Buddhism thrived in Taiwan ever since. During the Japanese occupation, Japanese schools of Buddhism (such as Shingon Buddhism, Jōdo Shinshū, Nichiren Shū) gained influence over many Taiwanese Buddhist temples as part of the Japanese policy of cultural assimilation.

Although many Buddhist communities affiliated with Japanese sects for protection, they largely retained Chinese Buddhist practices. For instance, the Japanisation of Chinese Buddhism, the introduction of clerical marriage and the practice of eating meat and drinking wine, was not as successful as in the Buddhist tradition of Japanese-occupied Korea.

Following the end of World War II and the establishment of the Republic of China on the island, many monks from mainland China moved to Taiwan, including Yin Shun (印順) who is generally considered to be the key figure who brought Humanistic Buddhism to Taiwan. They contributed significantly to the development of Chinese Buddhism on the island.

The Buddhist Association of the Republic of China remained the dominant Buddhist organization until the end of restrictions on religious activities in the 1980s. Today there are several large Humanistic Buddhist and Buddhist modernist organisations in Taiwan, including the Dharma Drum Mountain (Fǎgǔshān 法鼓山) founded by Sheng Yen (聖嚴), Buddha's Light International (Fóguāngshān 佛光山) founded by Hsing Yun (星雲), and the Tzu Chi Foundation (Cíjì jījīnhùi 慈濟基金會) founded by Cheng Yen (證嚴法師).

The zhaijiao Buddhist groups maintain an influence in society. In recent decades, also non-Chinese forms of Buddhism, such as Tibetan Buddhism and Soka Gakkai Nichiren Buddhism, have expanded in Taiwan. Adherence to Buddhism has grown significantly in Taiwan since the 1980s. From 800.000 in 1983 (4% of the population), the number of Buddhists expanded to 4.9 million in 1995 and subsequently to 8 million (35% of the population) in 2005.

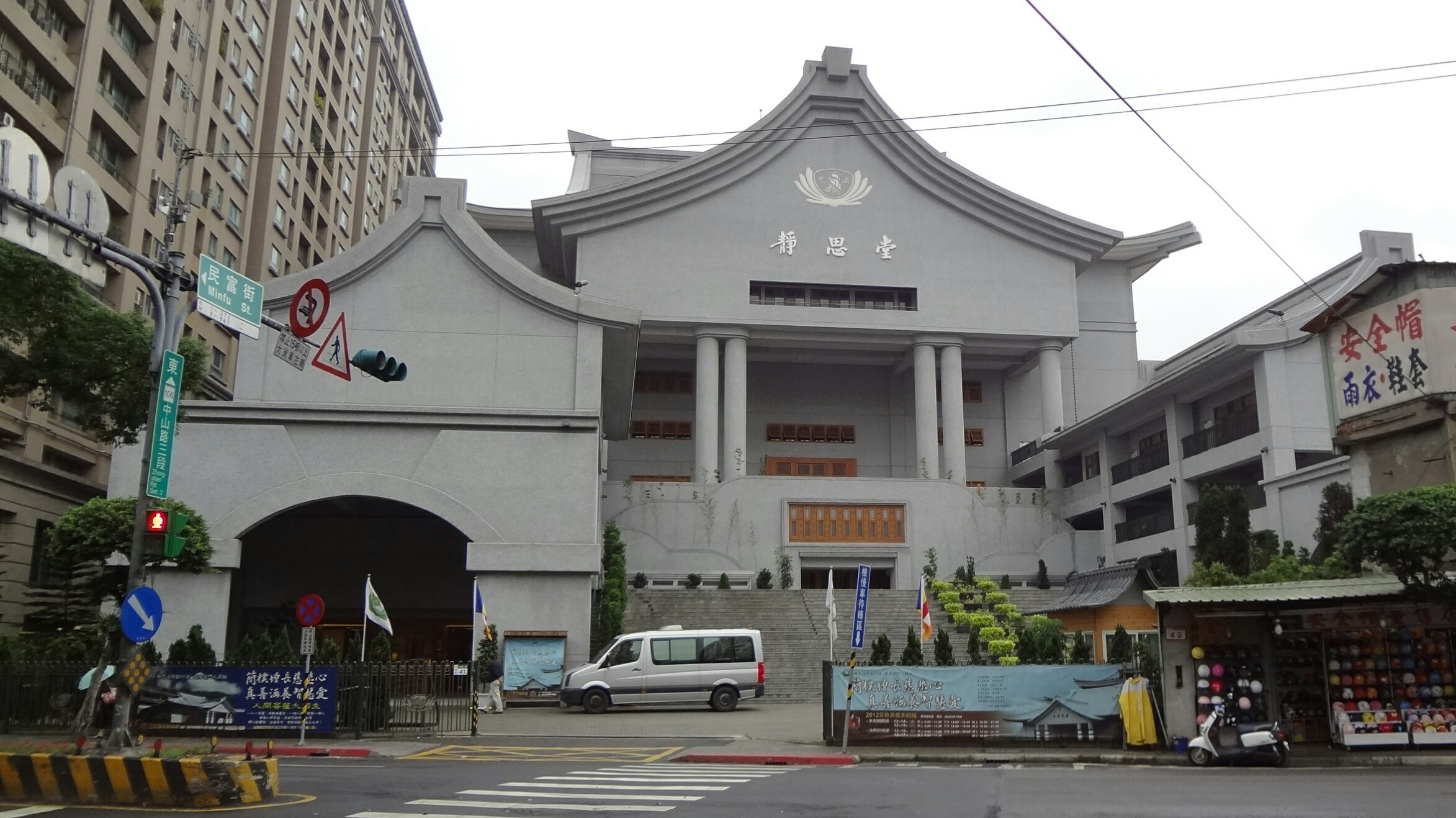
Shuang Ho Jing Temple of the Tzu Chi, in Zhonghe, New Taipei.

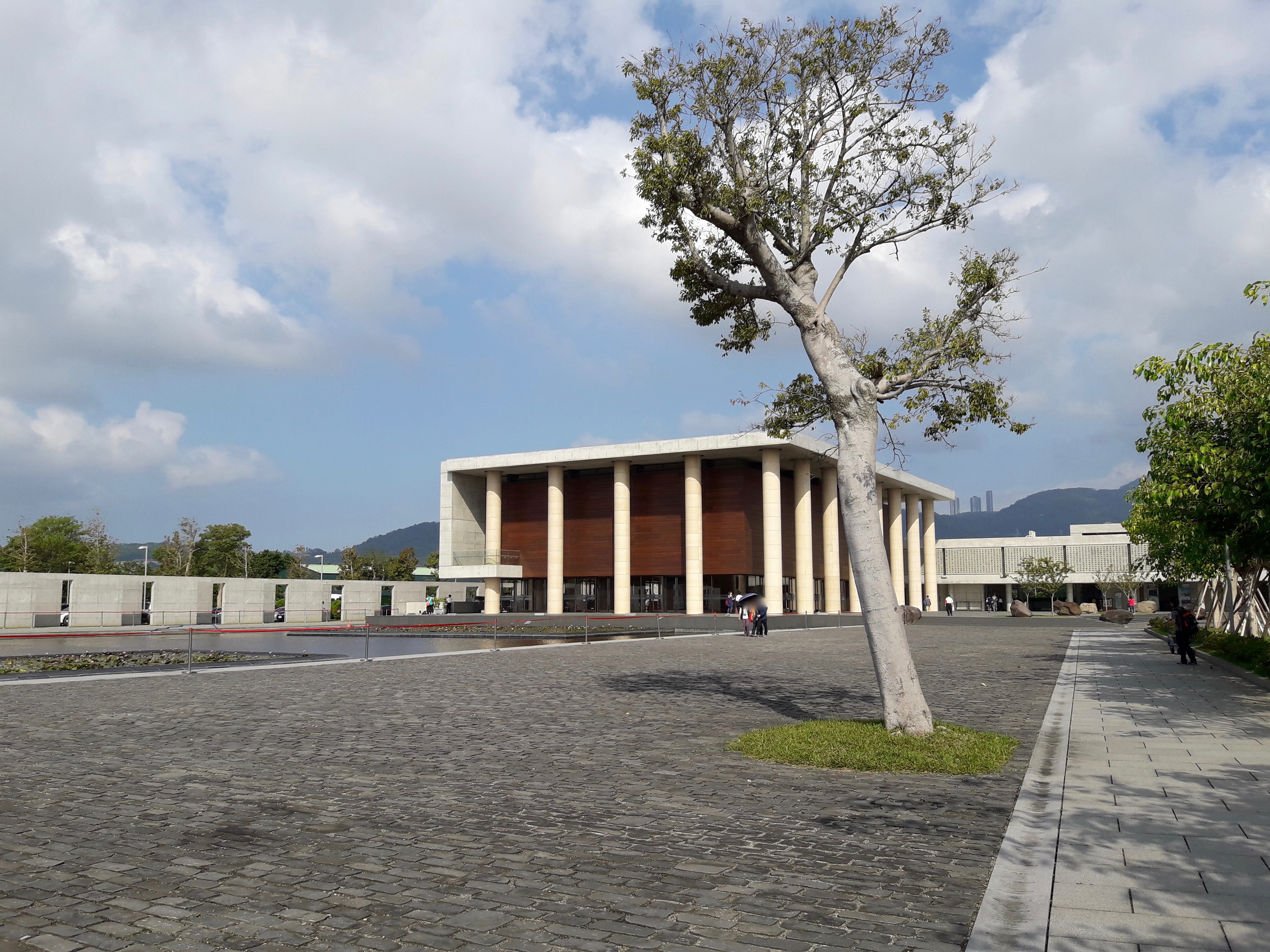
Nung Chan Monastery of Dharma Drum Mountain.

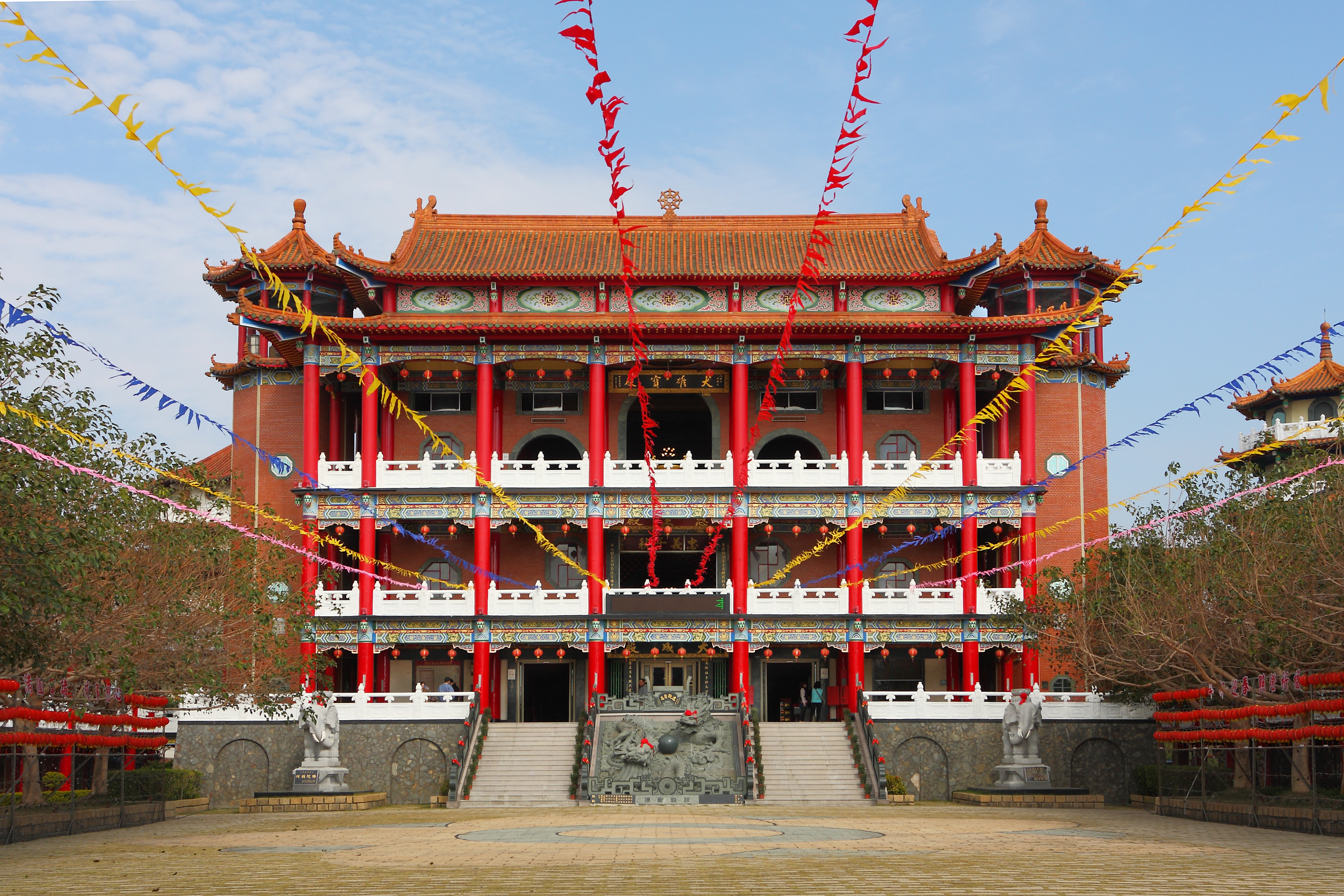
Temple of the Great Buddha in Changhua.

Chung Tai Chan Monastery in Puli, Nantou.

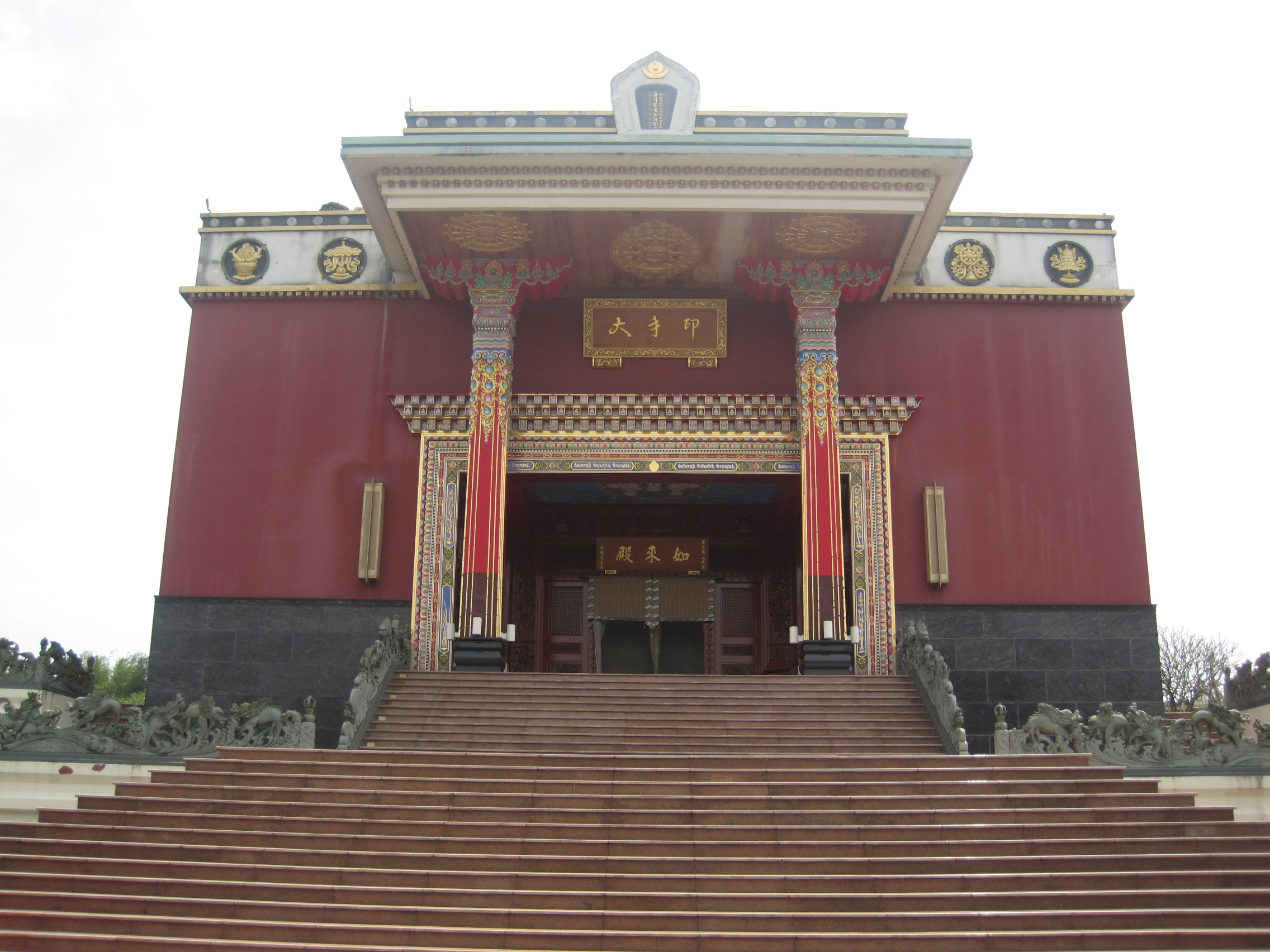
Karma Kagyu Temple, a temple of Tibetan Buddhism in Tainan.

=== Chinese salvationism ===
As of 2005, more than 10% of the population of Taiwan adhered to a variety of folk religious organisations of salvation. The largest of them is Yiguandao (with 3.5% of the population), followed by Tiandiism (whose two churches, the Holy Church of the Heavenly Virtue and the Lord of Universe Church, counted together constitute 2.2% of the island's population), Miledadao (an offshoot of Yiguandao accounting for 1.1%), Zailiism (0.8%) and Xuanyuanism (0.7%), and other minor movements including Precosmic Salvationism and Daiyiism. The three largest ones—Yiguandao, Tiandiism and Miledadao—and some others derive from the Xiantiandao tradition, making this the religious tradition of more than 7% of Taiwan's population. Other salvationisms with an important presence in Taiwan, though not documented in the 2005 official statistics, are Confucian Shenism (also called Luanism) and the recent Weixinism.

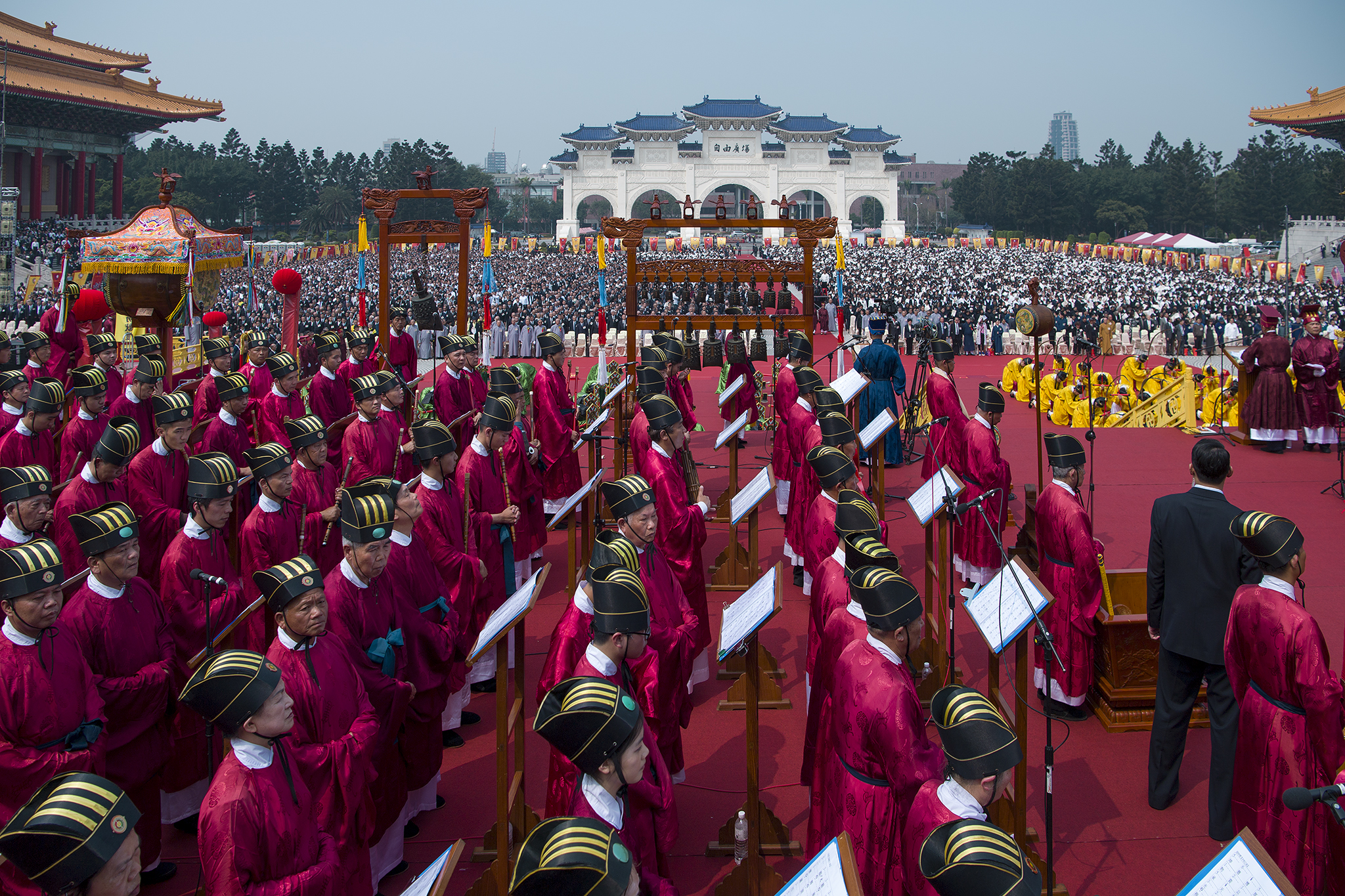
A Yiguandao-organised Confucian ceremony for the worship of gods and Heaven in March 2017. Yiguandao elders are those clad in grey robes.

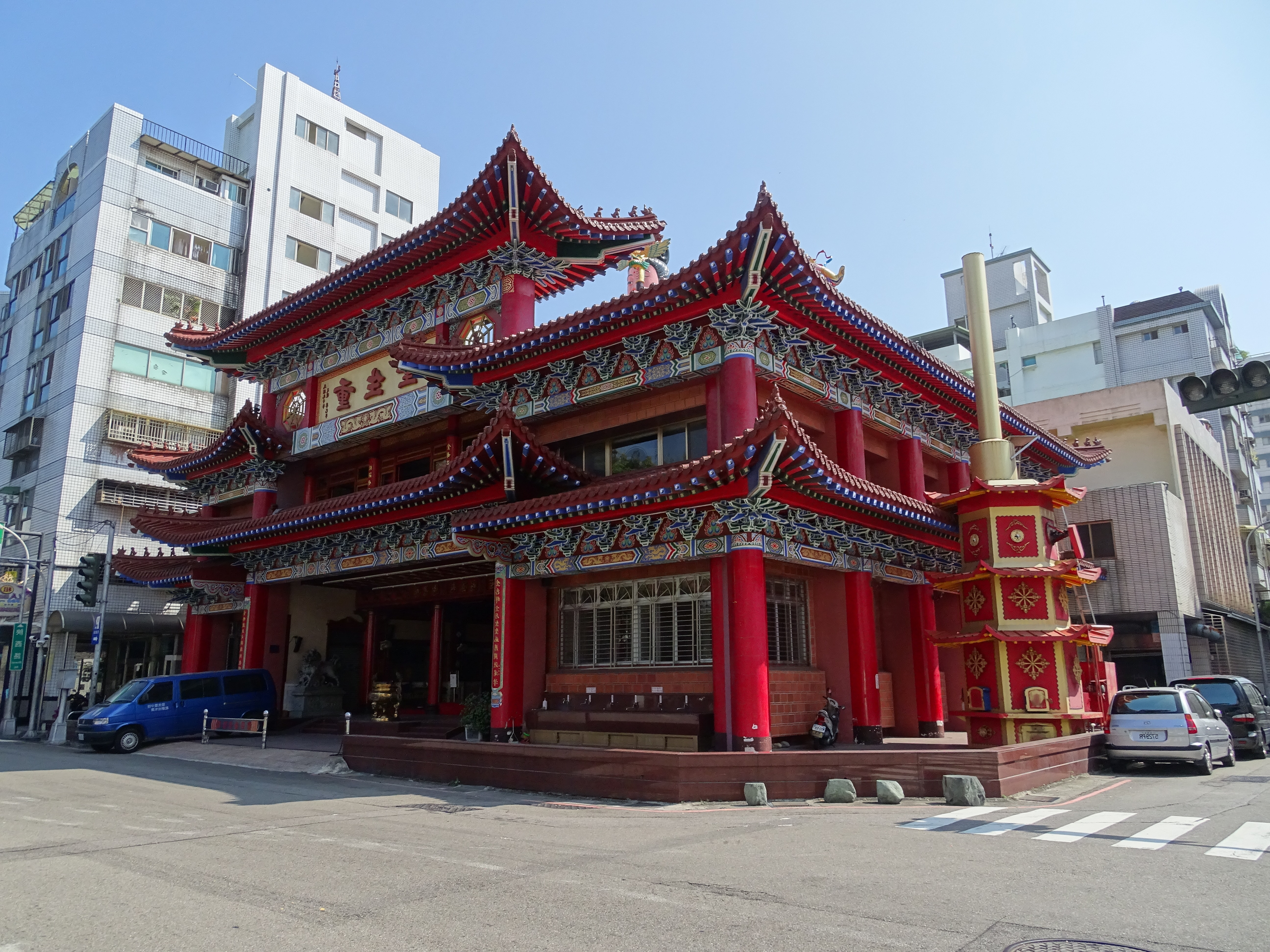
The Luanist Rebirth Church (重生堂 Chóngshēngtáng) in Taichung.

== Minor religions ==
=== Christianity ===
Christianity in Taiwan constituted 3.9% of the population, according to the census of 2005; Christians in Taiwan included approximately 600,000 Protestants, 300,000 Catholics and a small number of members of the Church of Jesus Christ of Latter-day Saints.

Estimates in 2020 suggested that the portion had risen to 4% or 6%.

Despite its minority status, many of the early Kuomintang political leaders of the Republic of China were Christians. Several Republic of China presidents have been Christians, including Sun Yat-sen who was a Congregationalist, Chiang Kai-shek and Chiang Ching-kuo who were Methodists, Lee Teng-hui is a member of the Presbyterian Church. The Presbyterian Church has strong ties with the Democratic Progressive Party since the 1980s.

Christianity in Taiwan has declined since the 1970s, after strong growth from 1950 to the 1960s.

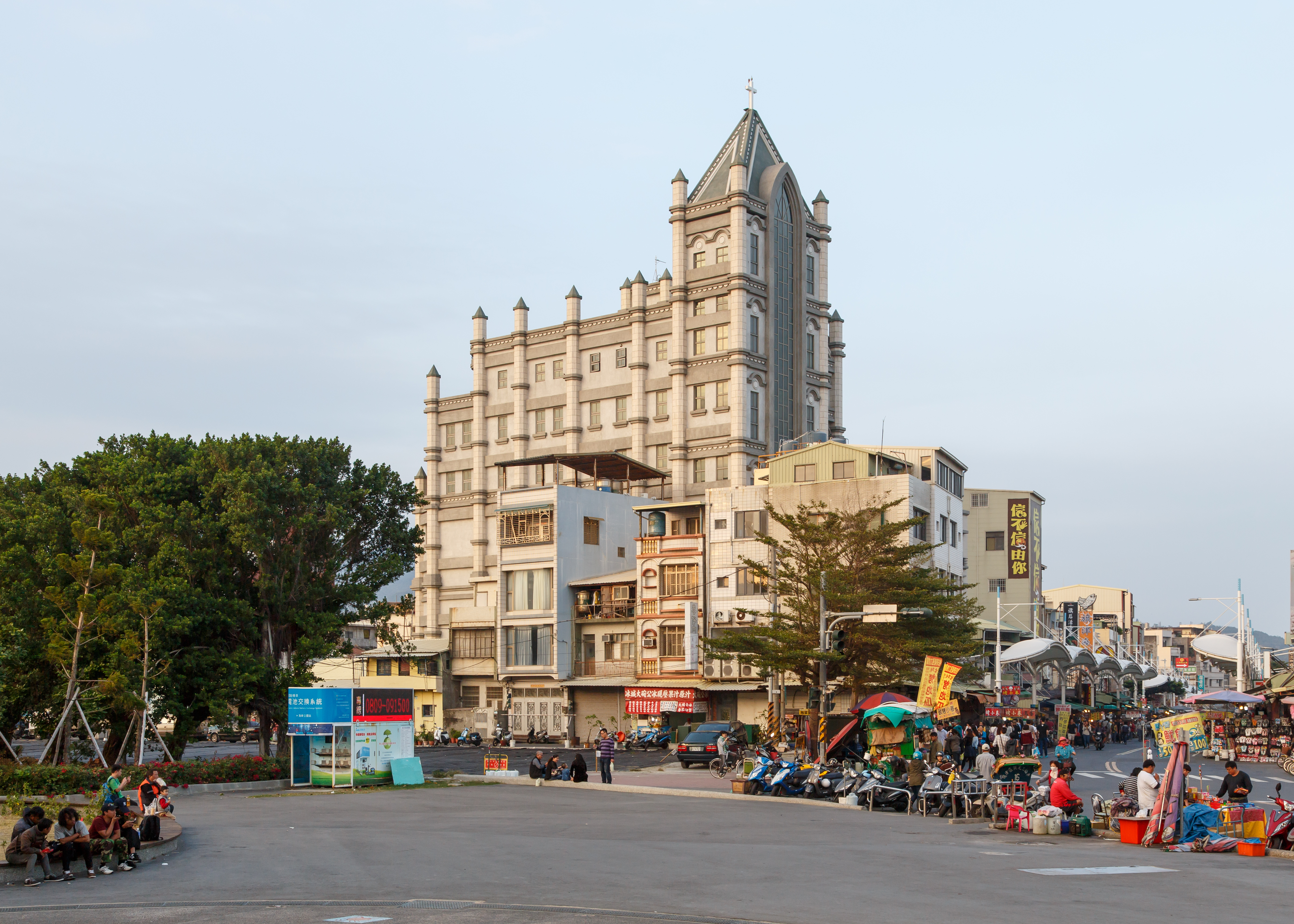
Cihou Presbyterian Church in Kaohsiung.

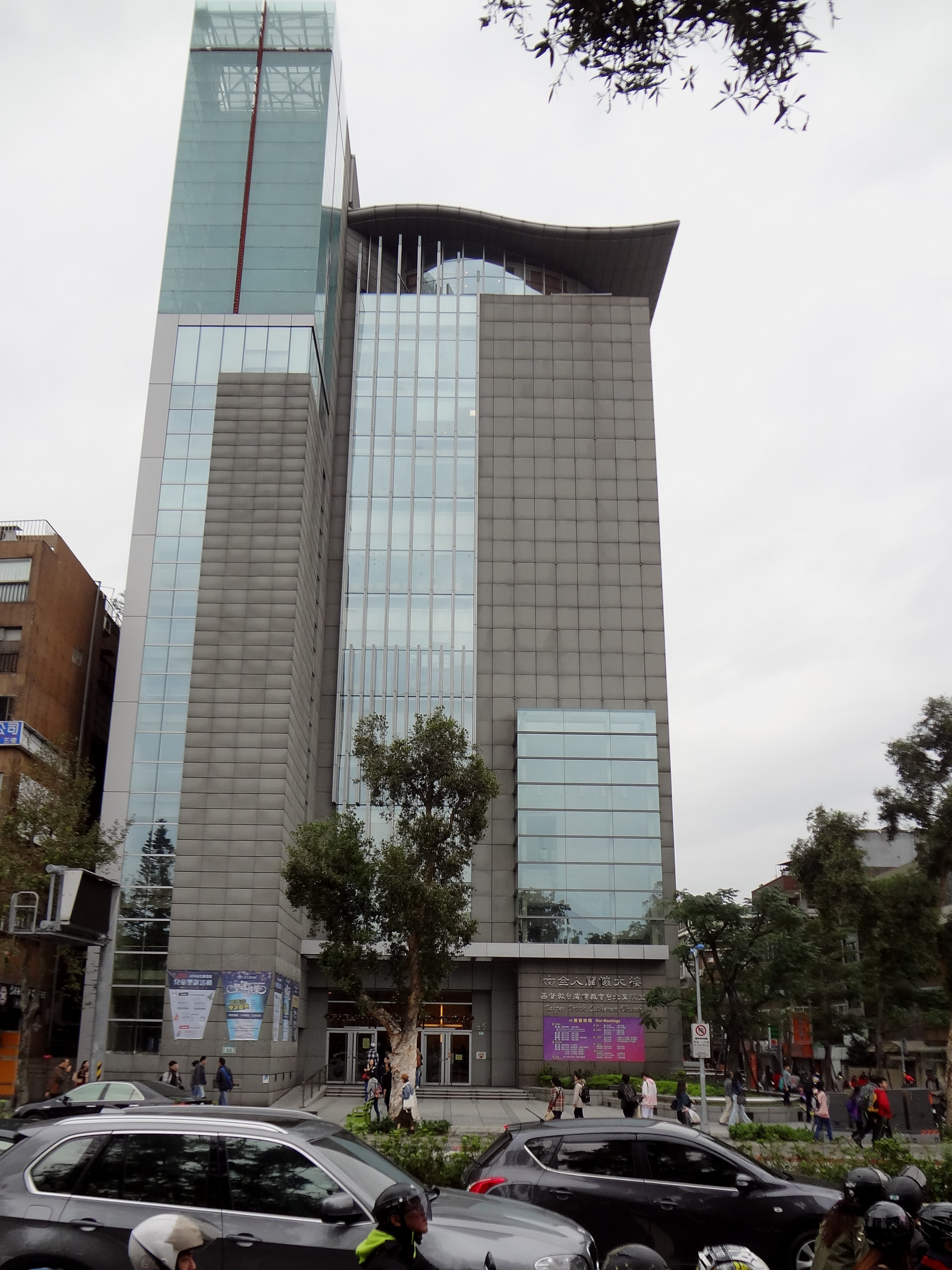
Truth Lutheran Church in Taipei.

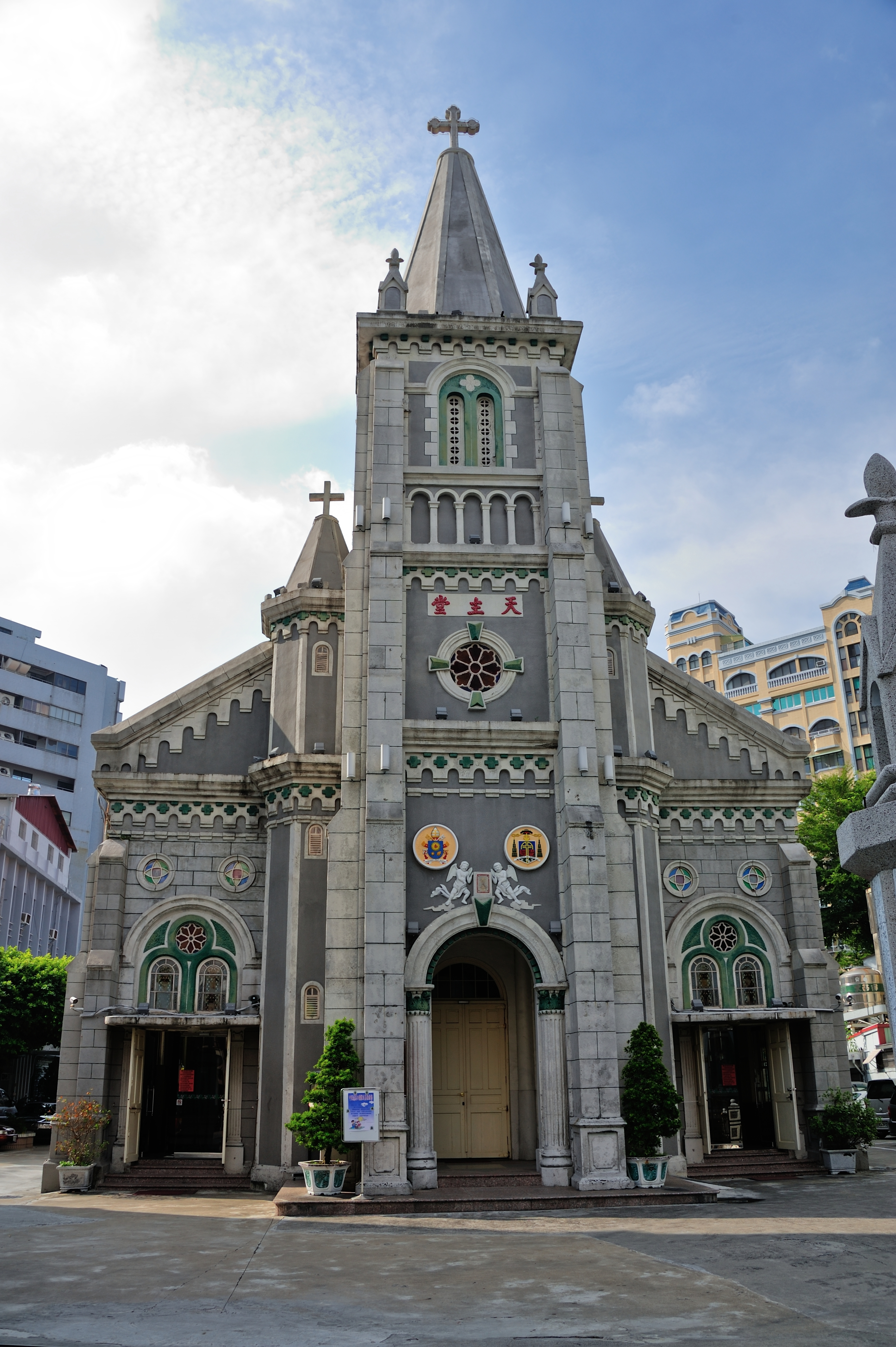
Holy Rosary Cathedral in Kaohsiung.

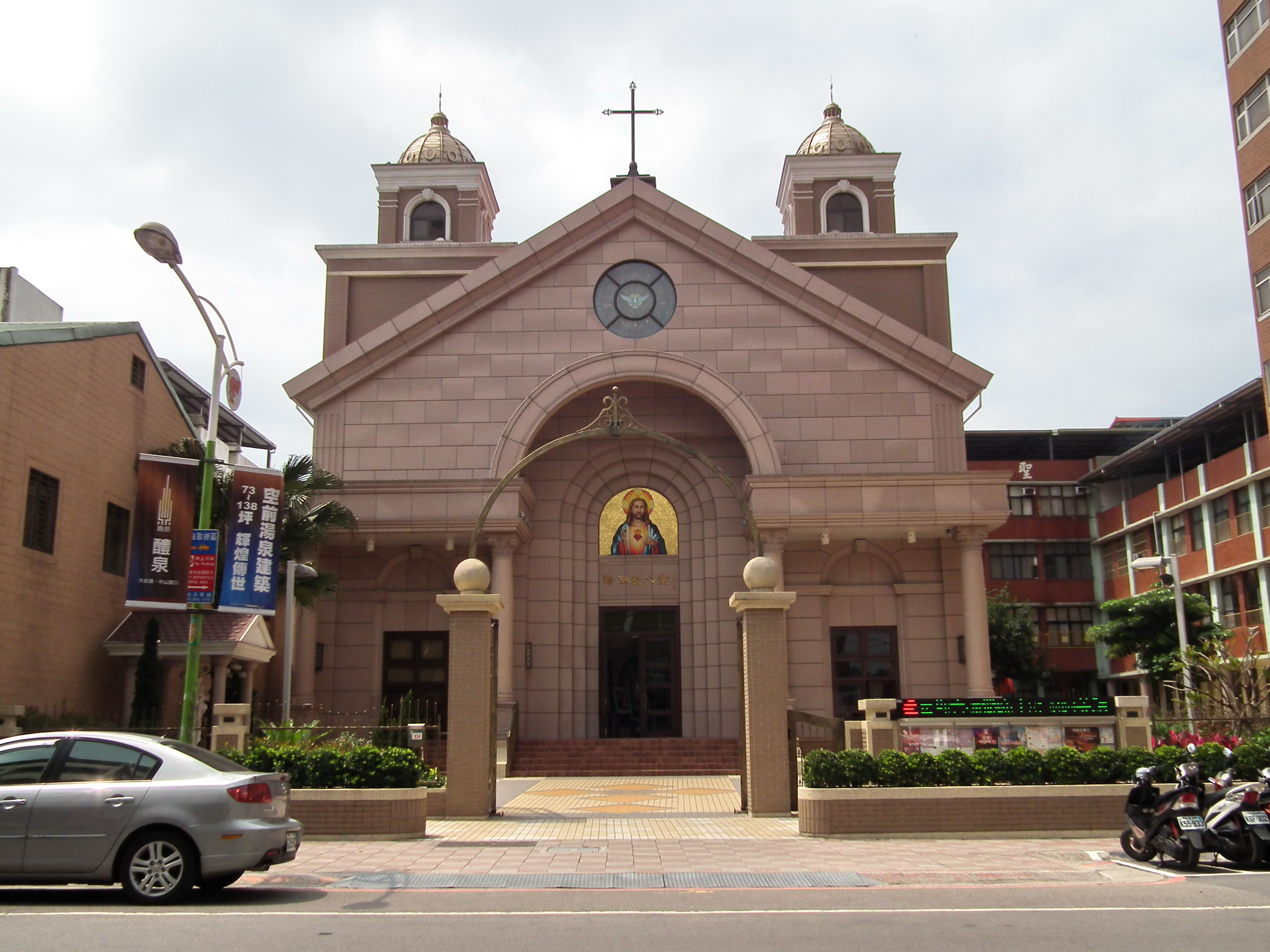
Sacred Heart of Jesus Catholic Church in Shulin, New Taipei.

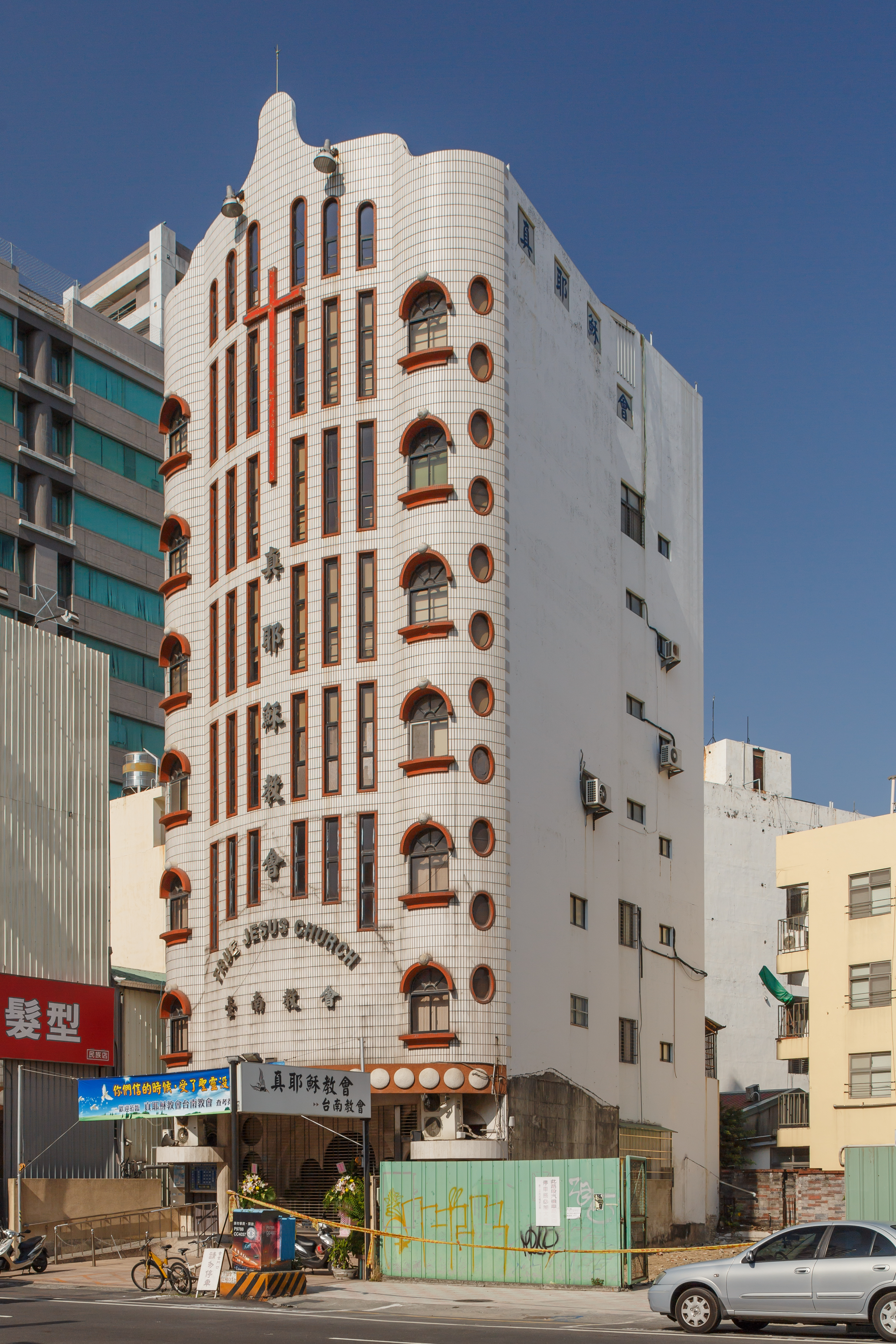
True Jesus Church in Tainan.

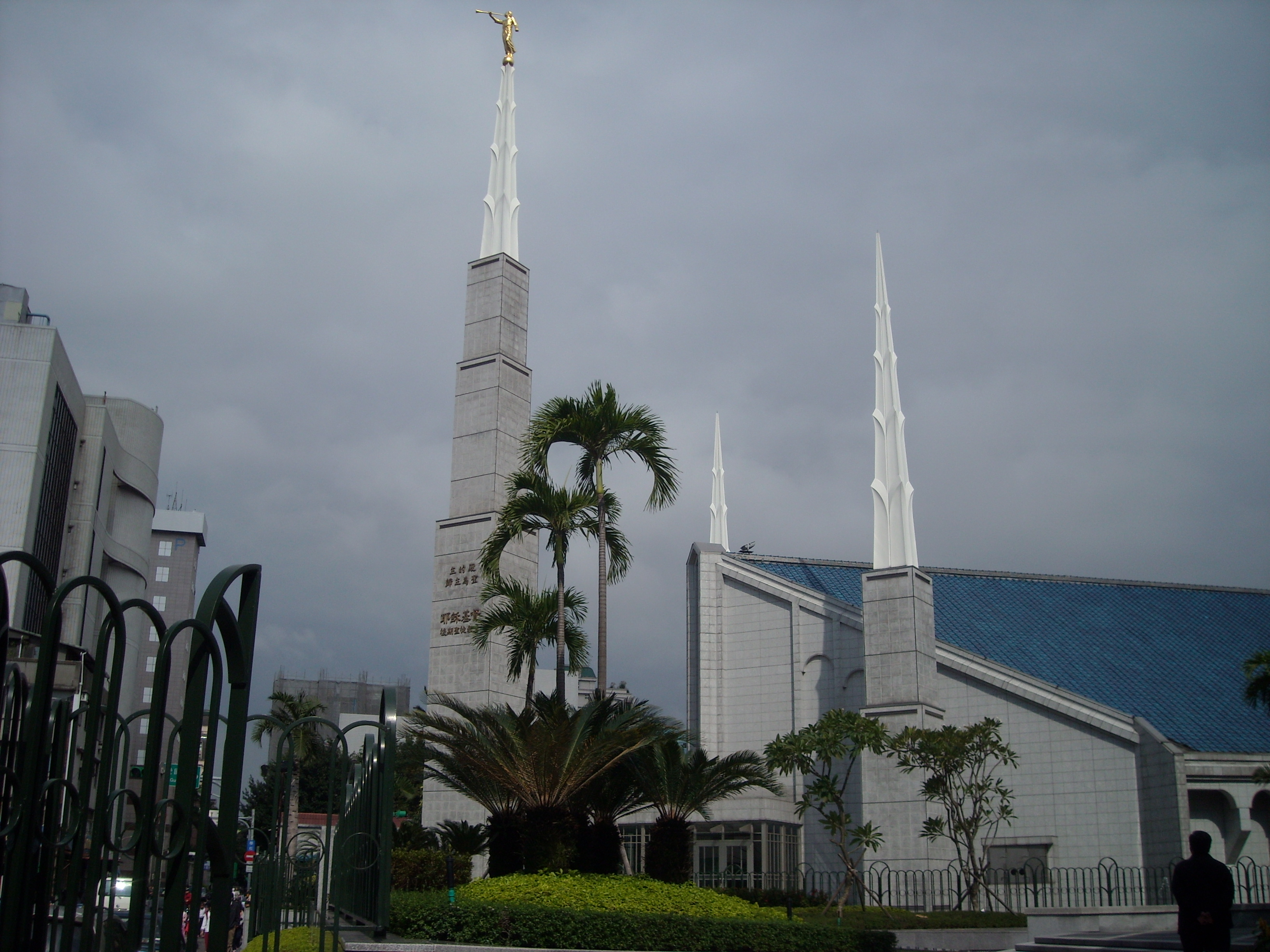
Taipei Taiwan Temple of the Church of Jesus Christ of Latter-day Saints.

=== Islam ===
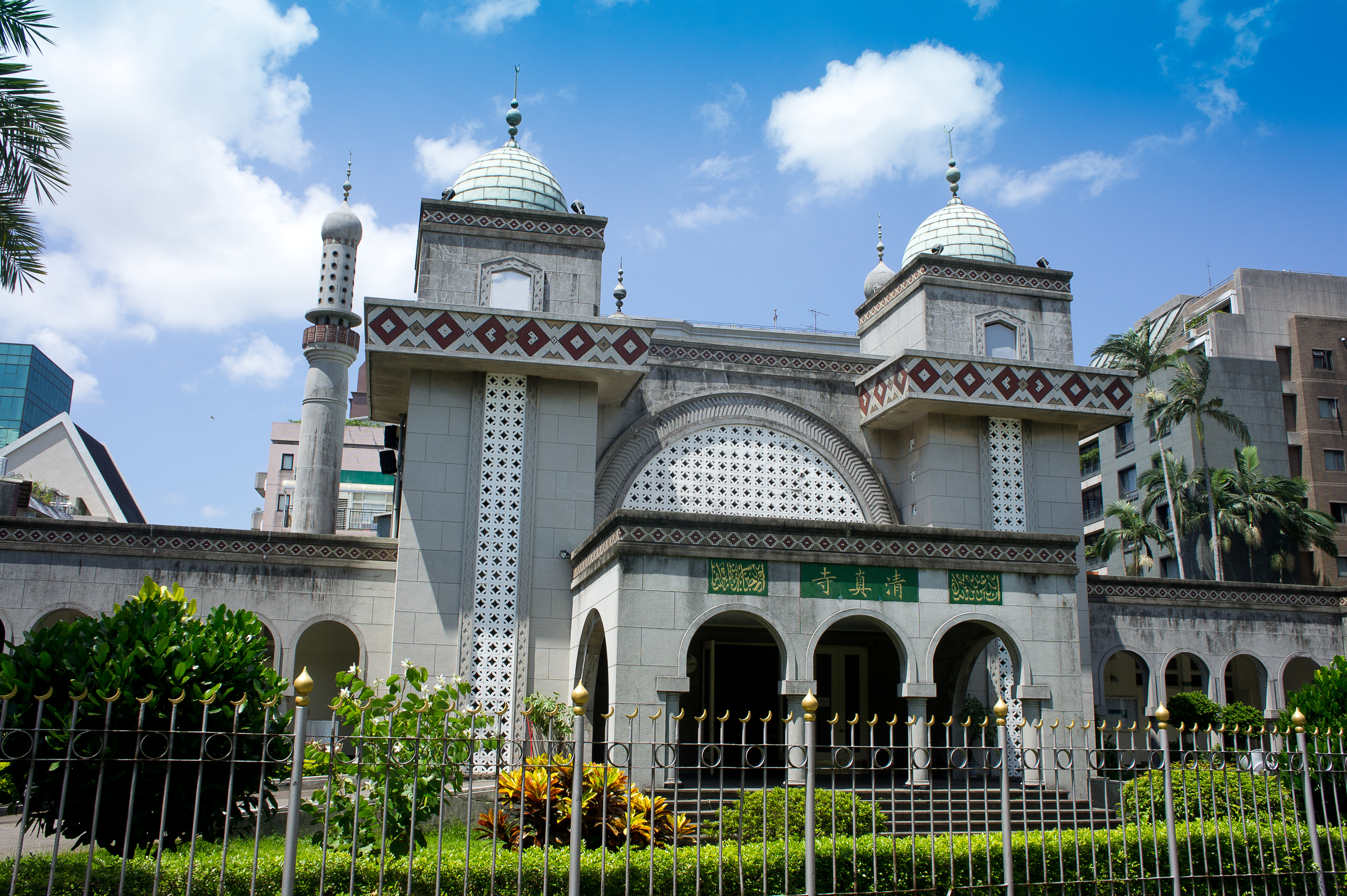
Taipei Grand Mosque in Daan, Taipei.

Though Islam originated in the Arabian Peninsula, it had spread eastward to China as early as the 7th century CE. Muslim merchants married local Chinese women, creating a new Chinese ethnic group called the Hui people. Islam first reached Taiwan in the 17th century when Muslim families from the southern China's coastal province of Fujian accompanied Koxinga on his invasion to oust the Dutch from Taiwan. Islam did not spread and their descendants became assimilated into the local Taiwanese society adopting the local customs and religions.

During the Chinese Civil War, some 20,000 Muslims, mostly soldiers and civil servants, fled mainland China with the Kuomintang to Taiwan. Since the 1980s, thousands of Muslims from Myanmar and Thailand, who are descendants of nationalist soldiers who fled Yunnan as a result of the communist takeover, have migrated to Taiwan in search of a better life. In more recent years, there has been a rise in Indonesian workers to Taiwan. According to the census of 2005, there were 58,000 Muslims in Taiwan in that year.

=== Baháʼí Faith ===
The history of the Baháʼí Faith (Chinese: 巴哈伊教; pinyin: Bāhāyījiào) in Taiwan began after the religion entered areas of China and nearby Japan. The first Baháʼís arrived in Taiwan in 1949 and the first of these to have become a Baháʼí was Jerome Chu (Chu Yao-lung) in 1945 while visiting the United States. By May 1955 there were eighteen Baháʼís in six localities across Taiwan. The first Local Spiritual Assembly in Taiwan was established in Tainan in 1956. With a growing number of Local Spiritual Assemblies (Taipei, Tainan, Hualien and Pingtung), the Taiwanese National Spiritual Assembly was established in 1967. In the 2005 official statistics on religion issued by the Department of Civil Affairs, the Baháʼís had 16,000 members and 13 Local Spiritual Assemblies.

=== Judaism ===
There has been a Jewish community in Taiwan since the 1950s. Since 2011, there has been a Chabad in Taipei.

=== Hinduism ===
There were 2,356 (0.01%) Hindus in Taiwan according to ARDA in 2020.

=== Shinto ===
Gaoshi Shrine was the first Shinto shrine rebuilt after World War II.

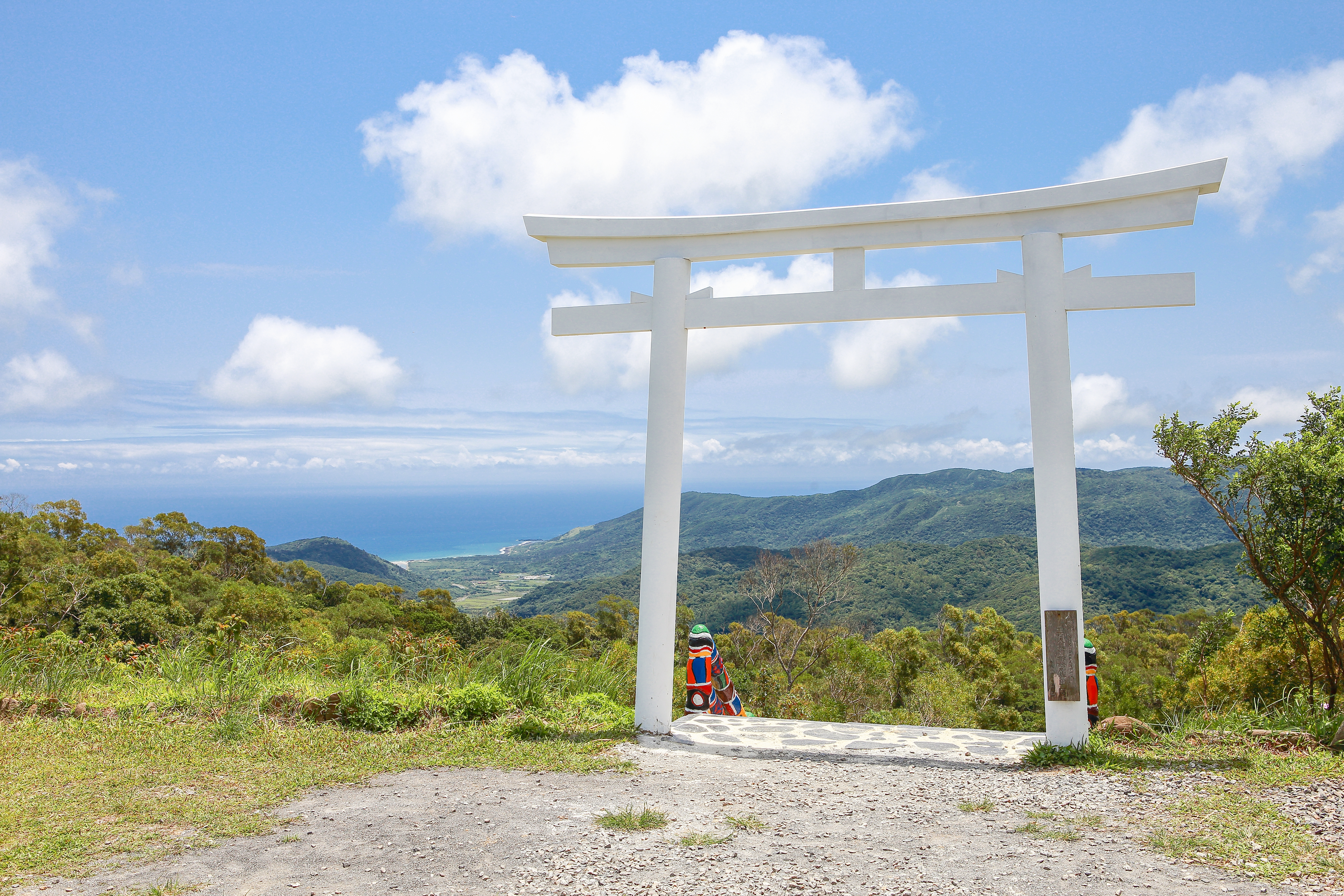
Gaoshi Shrine in Mudan, Pingtung.

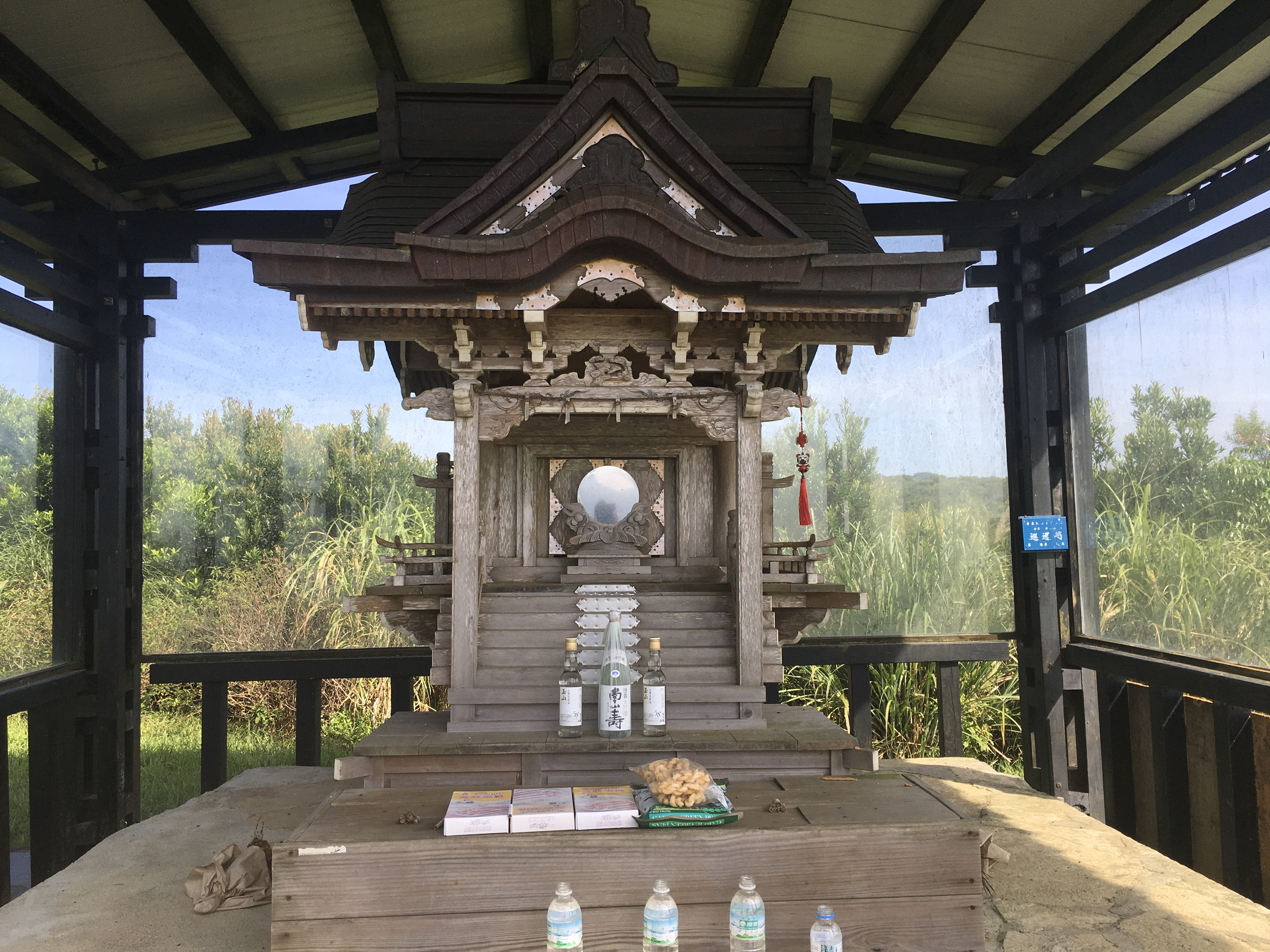
Hokora of Gaoshi Shrine.

== Census statistics ==
The table shows official statistics on religion issued by the Department of Civil Affairs, Ministry of the Interior ("MOI"), in 2005. The Taiwanese government recognizes 26 religions in Taiwan. The statistics are reported by the various religious organizations to the MOI:

Religion	Members	% of total population	Temples & churches
Buddhism (佛教)	8,086,000	35.1%	4,006
Taoism and folk religion (道教)	7,600,000	33.0%	18,274
Yiguandao (一貫道)	810,000	3.5%	3,260
Protestantism (基督新教)	605,000	2.6%	3,609
Catholic Church (羅馬天主教)	298,000	1.3%	1,151
Lord of Universe Church—Tiandiism (天帝教)	298,000	1.3%	50
Miledadao (彌勒大道)	250,000	1.1%	2,200
Holy Church of the Heavenly Virtue—Tiandiism (天德教)	200,000	0.9%	14
Zailiism/Liism (理教)	186,000	0.8%	138
Xuanyuanism (軒轅教)	152,700	0.7%	22
Islam (伊斯蘭教)	58,000	0.3%	7
Mormonism (耶穌基督後期聖徒教會)	51,090	0.2%	54
Tenriism (天理教)	35,000	0.2%	153
Church of Maitreya the King of the Universe (宇宙彌勒皇教)	35,000	0.2%	12
Haizidao (亥子道)	30,000	0.1%	55
Church of Scientology (山達基教會)	20,000	< 0.1%	7
Baháʼí Faith (巴哈伊教)	16,000	< 0.1%	13
Jehovah's Witnesses (耶和華見證人)	20,300	< 0.1%	177
True School of the Mysterious Gate (玄門真宗)	5,000	< 0.1%	5
Holy Church of the Middle Flower (中華聖教)	3,200	< 0.1%	7
Mahikari (真光教團)	1,000	< 0.1%	9
Precosmic Salvationism (先天救教)	1,000	< 0.1%	6
Yellow Middle (黃中)	1,000	< 0.1%	1
Dayiism (大易教)	1,000	< 0.1%	1
Total religious population	18,724,823	81.3%	33,223
Total population	23,036,087	100%	-

The figures for The Church of Jesus Christ of Latter-day Saints were not from the MOI, rather they were based on self-reported data from LDS Newsroom. The figures for Jehovah's Witnesses were not from the MOI and they were based on the Witnesses own 2007 Service Year Report. In the original report both of them were counted as part of Protestantism.

== Freedom of religion ==
Freedom of religion is enshrined in the constitution of the Republic of China (Taiwan), and ranked high at 9.2 on the Freedom Scale in 2018 according to the World Bank. In 2023, Taiwan scored 4 out of 4 under Freedom House's metric, "Are individuals free to practice and express their religious faith or nonbelief in public and private?".

== See also ==
- Chinese folk religion
- Chinese ancestral worship & Ancestral temples
- Baishatun Mazu Pilgrimage
- Qing Shan King Sacrificial Ceremony
- Wang Ye worship
- Four Great Mountains (Taiwan)
- Temples of Taichung
- List of Shinto shrines in Taiwan
- Religion in China
- Religion in Hong Kong
- Religion in Macau
- List of temples in Taiwan
- Taiwanese chicken-beheading rituals
