= Taiwanese chicken-beheading rituals =

Chicken-beheading rituals are a quasi-judicial ritual in Taiwanese culture that have acted as a dispute resolution mechanism for complicated and emotionally charged disputes that have not been settled in traditional courts or through private mediation. Chicken-beheading rituals have come to be associated with personal honesty in Taiwanese society and become more of a symbol of integrity than an actuality in contemporary Taiwan.

== History ==
Chicken-beheading rituals have historical roots in the legal traditions of China's Fujian province, where over 70% of Taiwanese citizens can trace their ancestry.

In feudal Fujianese society, individuals who were suspected of theft were taken before images of judges and forced to proclaim an oath of innocence. Someone hiding behind the judge image would then point at the defendant who would supposedly break down and confess if they were guilty.

Legal trials were also often conducted in the presence of images of deities as a way of forcing individuals to be honest. Temple managers even sometimes acted as judges themselves. These Fujianese trials have been embedded into Taiwanese culture and many other aspects of Fujianese tradition have also been transferred into Taiwanese chicken-beheading rituals, notably the use of oaths of innocence (賭咒; dǔzhòu) and use of local deities to encourage people to fear breaking their oaths.

In a broader sense, the history of chicken-beheading rituals represents the important role that religion plays in Taiwanese society; Taiwanese citizens turn to their local city deity to arbitrate when the Taiwanese legal system is insufficient.

The exact dates of the first instances of chicken-beheading rituals in Taiwan are unknown, yet the rituals were frequently practiced throughout the 19th century and were still common during the Japanese rule of Taiwan in the first half of the 20th century. However, the rate of chicken-beheading rituals declined as Taiwan rapidly modernised in the later half of the 20th century.

== Ritual ==
When private mediation has not worked and the Taiwanese legal system has been bypassed or failed to resolve a complicated dispute, chicken-beheading rituals have been used as a dispute resolution mechanism.

The actual chicken-beheading ritual involves two individuals at odds with one another over a dispute that may be personal or legal in nature. Both bring a chicken to their local temple which is often the temple of their local City God; the individuals then proclaims an oath of innocence while standing before their Deity.

An oath of innocence normally involves a brief description of where somebody lives, their age, a description of their version of the contested events and a statement proclaiming one's innocence and remonstrating that they are an honourable person. Finally the person will make a contingent curse upon themselves, promising that some kind of grave misfortune will happen to them or their families if they lied in their oath.

Chicken-beheading rituals can have a wide variety of ramifications, but generally help resolve the complicated disputes in question.

== Examples ==
Japanese legal academic Masuda Fukutaro recorded an example of successful dispute resolution through the ritual in Dongshan township, pre-World War Two, Taiwan, during Japanese rule. An individual, Wang Buren, borrowed 50 yuan from his friend, Chen Youyi, but did not return the money to Chen's widow after Chen died. Instead he asserted that he had already paid it. Chen's widow was told by the local court that as her husband had not kept a receipt of the loan, she could not bring the matter to court. She was distraught and so forced Wang to conduct a chicken-beheading ritual with her at the temple of the city god in Dongshan to determine who was telling the truth. Twenty days after proclaiming his oath of innocence, Wang was seen babbling and maniacally running through the streets, saying that he would be happy to give 100 yuan to Chen's widow to resolve the matter. In this way, the chicken-beheading ritual successfully forced the guilty party to admit his wrongdoing and thereby resolved the issue.

In another example, a wealthy man's home was robbed, and he blamed his assistant, who denied all knowledge of the crime. The assistant brought a white cockerel to the local city god in order to prove his innocence. During the ritual, he made it clear that he would be willing to suffer death if he was indeed guilty. Consequently, the real culprit feared so much for his life that he returned what he had stolen.

In both cases, the chicken-beheading ritual forced the guilty parties to confess and thus assisted in successfully resolving disputes.

== Symbolism ==
Taiwanese chicken-beheading rituals have often led to the resolution of disputes because of what they symbolise.

Taiwanese chicken-beheading rituals are deeply laden with symbolism. The chicken is considered a representation of the human that is beheading it. The implication of beheading the chicken is that the human would be willing to die or lose their integrity if their oath of innocence was false. In such a god fearing society, as Taiwan traditionally has been, the gravitas involved in symbolically killing yourself after proclaiming your honesty and innocence has a profound power in the cultural imagination of society.

The reasons for using chickens, as opposed to other animals, in this ritual are both symbolic and practical. Chickens symbolise the sun (陽) and positive forces of life and vitality in Chinese and Taiwanese culture. However, it is commonly understood that the main reason chickens were used is that chickens remained extremely cheap and plentiful in both Southern China and Taiwan. As such, ordinary people could not only easily decapitate a chicken without much hassle but also conveniently buy one from their local butcher.

== Politics ==
Due to their bloody nature, chicken-beheading rituals are rarely performed in modern Taiwan.

However, many politicians make oaths of innocence in local temples to boost their chances of getting elected. In spring 2001, Yen Ching-piao was accused of extortion and attempted murder. He made an oath proclaiming that he was a man of integrity and innocent of any wrongdoing in one of Taiwan's most renowned temples, the Zhenlan Gong. This asservation served to bolster his political capital as the dramatic display made his constituents believe that he was indeed an honest and good man.

Chicken-beheading rituals are occasionally referred to metaphorically in modern Taiwanese politics. When James Soong was accused of embezzling funds from his own Kuomintang (KMT) Party, he was depicted performing a chicken-beheading ritual to prove his innocence in a cartoon by the Liberty Times. This cartoon vehemently ridiculed Soong because he was a member of the Westernised elite and would not engage in such a traditional ritual. The cartoon also demonstrated how the image of a chicken being beheaded still resounded in the minds of the Taiwanese people.

In this way chicken-beheading rituals are used in an allegorical sense in modern Taiwan, mostly in the political sphere, and few chickens are actually beheaded. The honour and sincerity that has been historically attached to chicken-beheading rituals remains a potent force in Taiwanese society.

== See also ==
- City God (China)
- Chinese folk religion
- Religion in Taiwan
- Religious symbolism
- History of law in Taiwan
- History of Taiwan
- Politics of the Republic of China
- Rituals
- Taiwanese tea culture

== Footnotes ==
=== References ===
- Overmyer, D. L., ed. (2003). Religion in China Today. The China Quarterly Special Issues New Series. Vol. 3. Cambridge: Cambridge University Press.
- De Groot, J. M. G. (1964). The Religious System of China: its ancient forms, evolution, history and present aspect, manners, customs and social institutions connected therewith. Vol. I. Amsterdam: Literature House. ISBN 1314345567.
- Jordan, D. K.; Morris, A. D.; Moskowitz, M. L., eds. (2004). The Minor Arts of Daily Life: Popular Culture in Taiwan. Hawai’i: University of Hawai’i Press. ISBN 0824828003.
- Ma, Laurence J. C.; Cartier, Carolyn L. (2003). The Chinese Diaspora: Space, Place, Mobility and Identity. Maryland: Rowman & Littlefield. ISBN 074251756X.
- Katz, P. R. (2009). Divine Justice: Religion and the Development of Chinese Legal Culture. New York: Academia Sinica. ISBN 978-0415574334.
