= Zaili teaching =

Zailiism
- 在理教
- Type: Chinese salvationist religion
- Founder: Yang Zai
- Origin: 17th century Tianjin
- Members: 1948: 15 million
- Other names: Liism, Gate of the Principle (理门 Lǐmén), White-Clad Way (白衣道), Octagon Way (八方道)
- Official website: http://www.liism.org/

Zailiism (Chinese: 在理教; pinyin: Zàilǐjiào; trans. "Way of the Abiding Principle" (Note: Zai li means "abiding principle", "staying in principle", "staying in truth", "remaining faithful to the universal truth"; "jiao" means a "teaching" or "transmission".)) or Liism (理教; Lǐjiào; "transmission of the principle"), also known as the Báiyīdào (白衣道; "White-Clad Way") or Bāfāngdào (八方道; "Octagonal Way"), is a Chinese folk religious sect of north China, founded in the 17th century by Yang Zai. It claims a Taoist identity and is centered on the worship of Guanyin as the incarnation of the principle of the universe, the "Only God of the Unlimited" (无极只神; Wújí Zhīshén).

== History ==
=== Yang Zai's life ===
Zailiism was founded during the waning years of the Ming dynasty by Yang Zai (1621–1754; alias Yang Chengqing or Yang Rulai), a holder of the jinshi degree from Jimo, Shandong. Although anxious to take up an official position, Yang remained in Jimo to care for his aged mother. After her death he became a religious leader, and there are different accounts about how this happened. Some sources attribute this to a vision or encounter with Guanyin.

He certainly migrated to the mountains of Ji County in Tianjin. Here he remained for ten years in meditation in the Lanshui Cave, he purified himself and formulated his philosophical teachings revolving around the Eight Proscriptions (ba jie). At the age of eighty he took ten disciples, who were sent in different directions to spread the teaching. Yang, thanks to his techniques of meditation and refinement, reputedly died at the age of 133.

=== 18th century: Yin Ruo leadership ===
The religion was formally established in Tianjin, and by the mid 18th century it had spread throughout north China. Mass following was founded on the work of Yin Ruo (1729–1806; alias Yin Laifeng and Yin Zhongshan), the second great patriarch in the history of the sect. In 1766, Yin founded the first common house (gong suo) in the suburbs of Tianjin; common houses became the basic and characteristic organisation units of Zailiism. They are both temples and meeting houses, and early common houses were rooms in private homes and village temples. By the early republican period some of them had evolved into elaborate complexes of buildings and courtyards.

Common houses were run by two layers of leadership: ritual and administrative. The ritual ministers were the dangjia, celibate men who engaged in a strict self-cultivation regimen. In Tianjin every common house had a single dangjia, who more than parish priests were holy men and moral exemplars, who led few yearly rituals of the sect. The administrative counterpart was the "manager" (chengbanren), a lay who cared for the daily activities of the common house.

=== 19th and 20th century ===
The spread of Zailiism did not go unnoticed, and in the 19th century Qing dynasty officials carried out various investigations to verify the orthodoxy of the sect, always concluding that it was orthodox and contributed to the economy and morality of the population. Some officials advised the throne not only to recognise the sect, but even to encourage it to counter the growing influence of Christianity.

In 1891, Zaili lodges led an uprising on Mongolian territories of Rehe, in a climate of Han Chinese discontent with privileges of the Mongol nobility and the Catholic Church. Although the uprising was crushed, the tensions festered and reemerged within the Boxer Rebellion at the turn of the century.

The sect grew rapidly in the last years of the Qing dynasty and in the early republic. Zaili adherents operated a large number of lodges and took over some disrepaired temples of other religions. By the late 19th century it had already established a strong presence in Manchuria, and by the early 20th century it started to exhibit a national character. It even spread among ethnic Chinese in Russia. By the 1920s the sect had an established presence in all major cities of China, and when Jiangsu province outlawed it in 1929, influential leaders of Beijing, Tianjin and Shanghai appealed to the national government to have the ban lifted. In August 1929 the Ministry of the Interior gave explicit approval to Zailiism.

=== Contemporary developments ===
Zailiism returned active in China's Hebei province since the late 1990s. It also has 186,000 members in Taiwan, corresponding to 0.8% of the total population. There is a Chinese United Church of Liism (simplified Chinese: 中华理教总会; traditional Chinese: 中華理教總會; pinyin: Zhōnghuá Lǐjiào Zǒnghuì) and other smaller bodies.

== Philanthropy ==
The most characteristic element of Zailiism is the emphasis on physical purity and abstinence from addictive substances. Zailiism spread as members founded charities and campaigned for abstinence from alcohol, tobacco, and opium, and offering cures for the addicts. Zaili followers developed drug rehabilitation centres using herbal medicines and self-cultivation techniques (zhengshen), which were said to fully cure two hundred addicts per year.

Zaili members also founded the "China's General Association for the Prevention of Alcohol and Tobacco According to the Righteously Good Teachings" (中華全國理善勸戒煙酒總會; Zhōnghuá quánguó lǐ shàn quàn jièyān jiǔ zǒng huì), that was recognized by the Yuan Shikai government in June 1913.

== See also ==
New religious movement

- Taoism

== Sources ==
- Palmer, D. A. (2011). "Chinese Redemptive Societies and Salvationist Religion: Historical Phenomenon or Sociological Category?" (PDF). Journal of Chinese Ritual, Theatre and Folklore. 172: 21–72.
- Yang, Mayfair Mei-hui (2008). Chinese Religiosities: Afflictions of Modernity and State Formation (PDF). University of California Press.
- Goossaert, Vincent; Palmer, David (2011). The Religious Question in Modern China. University of Chicago Press. ISBN 0226304167.
- Tertitski, Konstantin (2007). "Zailijiao in Russia: A Chinese Syncretic Religion in Diaspora". International Sinological Symposium. 4. Taipei: Fu Jen Catholic University: 414–443.
- Dubois, Thomas David (2005). The Sacred Village: Social Change and Religious Life in Rural North China (PDF). University of Hawaii Press. ISBN 0824828372. Archived from the original (PDF) on 2016-02-14.
- Yeh, Wen-hsin (2000). Becoming Chinese: Passages to Modernity and Beyond. University of California Press. ISBN 0520222180.
