= Zhongshan Min =

Chinese (Min) dialect

- 中山闽语 / 中山閩語
- Native to: China
- Region: Zhongshan, Guangdong
- Native speakers: 140,000 (2005)
- Language family: Sino-Tibetan: Sinitic; Chinese; Min; Coastal Min; Eastern Min and Southern Min; Zhongshan Min
- Early forms: Proto-Sino-Tibetan: Old Chinese (Note: Min is believed to have split from Old Chinese, rather than Middle Chinese like other varieties of Chinese.); Proto-Min

Language codes
- ISO 639-3: None (mis)
- Glottolog: zhon1238 Zhongshan Min

Min dialect islands in Zhongshan: (1) Longdu, (2) Nanlang, (3) Sanxiang

Zhongshan Min (simplified Chinese: 中山闽语; traditional Chinese: 中山閩語), known as Cunhua (村话; 村話) by its speakers, are three Min Chinese dialect islands in the Zhongshan region of the southern Chinese province of Guangdong. The Zhongshan Min people settled in the region from Fujian Province as early as the Northern Song dynasty period (1023–1031). The three dialects are:

- Longdu dialect, spoken mainly in Shaxi and Dachong in the west of the prefecture,
- Nanlang dialect or Dongxiang dialect, spoken mainly in Nanlang and Zhangjiabian in the east, and
- Sanxiang dialect, spoken in Sanxiang in the south.

According to Nicholas Bodman, the Longdu and Nanlang dialects belong to the Eastern Min group, while the Sanxiang dialect belongs to Southern Min. All three have been heavily influenced by the Shiqi dialect, the local variety of Yue Chinese.

As the dialect with the most speakers, the Longdu dialect may be taken as the representative dialect of Zhongshan Min.

== Sources ==
- Bodman, Nicholas C. (1982). "The Namlong Dialect, a Northern Min Outlier in Zhongshan Xian and the Influence of Cantonese on its Lexicon and Phonology" (PDF). Tsing Hua Journal of Chinese Studies. 14 (1): 1–19. Archived from the original (PDF) on 2020-02-03.
- Bodman, Nicholas C. (1985). "The Reflexes of Initial Nasals in Proto-Southern Min-Hingua". In Acson, Veneeta; Leed, Richard L. (eds.). For Gordon H. Fairbanks. Oceanic Linguistics Special Publications. Vol. 20. University of Hawaii Press. pp. 2–20. ISBN 978-0-8248-0992-8. JSTOR 20006706.
- Gao, Ran (2002). 中山閩語的聲調與閩、粵語聲調的關係 [The tones of Zhongshan Min and the relationship between Min and Yue tones]. In Ting, Pang-hsin; Chang, Song-hing (eds.). 閩語研究及其與周邊方言的關係 [The Study of Min Dialects and Its Relationship with Other Peripheral Dialects] (in Chinese). Hong Kong: Chinese University Press. pp. 115–126. ISBN 9789622019966. OCLC 50568616.
- Editorial Board of the Gazetteer of Zhongshan City, ed. (2012). 方言 [Topolects]. 中山市志 1979–2005 [Gazetteer of Zhongshan City 1979–2005] (in Chinese). Guangzhou: Guangdong People's Publishing House. pp. 1522–1559.

== See also ==
- List of Chinese dialects § Min
