= Zhanjiang dialect =

Chinese dialect mostly spoken in the city of Zhanjiang

Zhanjiang
- 湛江話
- Native to: China
- Region: Mainly in Zhanjiang, southwestern Guangdong province.
- Language family: Sino-Tibetan: Sinitic; Chinese; Min; Coastal Min; Southern Min?; Qiong–Lei; Leizhou Min; Zhanjiang
- Early forms: Proto-Sino-Tibetan: Old Chinese (Note: Min is believed to have split from Old Chinese, rather than Middle Chinese like other varieties of Chinese.); Proto-Min

Language codes
- ISO 639-3: –
- Glottolog: None
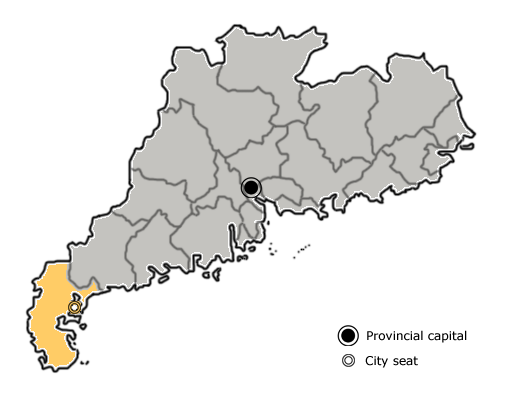
- Zhanjiang dialect

The Zhanjiang dialect is a dialect mostly spoken in Zhanjiang in Guangdong, China. It is a sub-dialect of Leizhou Min.

== See also ==
- Varieties of Chinese
