= Longdu dialect =

Eastern Min Chinese dialect in Guangdong

- 隆都話
- Native to: China
- Region: Dachong and Shaxi, Guangdong, Hawaii, US-Canada Chinatowns
- Language family: Sino-Tibetan: Sinitic; Chinese; Min; Coastal Min; Eastern Min; (Zhongshan Min); Longdu dialect
- Early forms: Proto-Sino-Tibetan: Old Chinese (Note: Min is believed to have split from Old Chinese, rather than Middle Chinese like other varieties of Chinese.); Proto-Min

Language codes
- ISO 639-3: None (mis)
- Glottolog: long1252
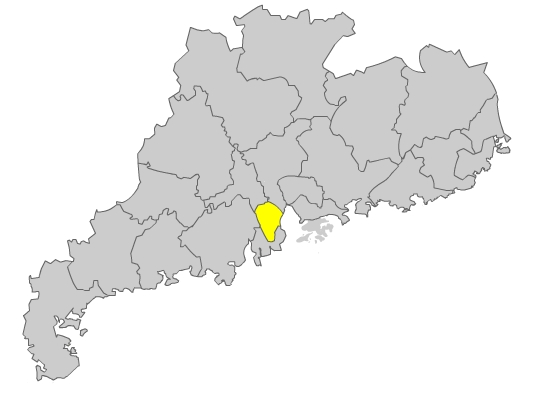
- Location of Zhongshan 中山 within Guangdong 广东 Province, China

The Longdu dialect is a variety of the Eastern Min branch of Chinese originating from the towns of Dachong and Shaxi in Zhongshan in the Pearl River Delta of Guangdong. The two regions Shaxi and Dachong are together informally known as the Longdu region to locals and those overseas. There are more than 40 villages in the region and they are held together by their shared dialect, which may be classified as endangered due to its deterioration in status and rapidly decreasing popularity even within the Longdu region. Despite its proximity, the Longdu dialect is not very closely related to the surrounding dialects in the region, which belong to the Yue group. As such, Longdu forms a "dialect island" of Min speakers. It is one of three enclaves of Min in Zhongshan, the others being Sanxiang and Nanlang.

== Vocabulary ==
According to Søren Egerod, who published an extensive study of the dialect based on fieldwork conducted in 1949, the vocabulary consists of three layers:

- a pre-Tang colloquial layer, which seems to be related to the Fuzhou dialect,
- a Tang-period colloquial layer, which seems to be related to various Southern Min varieties, and
- a layer of literary readings based on the Shiqi dialect, the local Yue variety.

== Distribution ==
The Longdu dialect is the mother tongue of many overseas Chinese. Its native speakers generally understand Cantonese, but not vice versa. According to the Language Documentation Training Center at the University of Hawaiʻi at Mānoa: "A lot of children do not speak the language in their daily lives. The population of speakers is diminishing." This is generally ascribed to the emigration of speakers from the Longdu region to other countries, and due to the lack of inter-generational transmission. Only Mandarin is taught to children at school, due to its status as the official national language. In contrast, in the home, parents and grandparents teach the children only Cantonese, given that the Longdu region is within Zhongshan, Guangdong, and that Cantonese is generally viewed as the lingua franca of Guangdong.

== See also ==
- List of Chinese dialects
