= Sanxiang dialect =

Southern Min dialect island in Sanxiang

Sanxiang
- 三乡话 / 三乡闽语
- Sa^{1}hiu^{1} / Sahiu
- Native to: China
- Region: Mainly in Sanxiang, southern Guangdong province.
- Native speakers: about 30,000
- Language family: Sino-Tibetan: Sinitic; Chinese; Min; Coastal Min; Southern Min; (Zhongshan Min); Sanxiang
- Early forms: Proto-Sino-Tibetan: Old Chinese (Note: Min is believed to have split from Old Chinese, rather than Middle Chinese like other varieties of Chinese.); Proto-Min
- Writing system: Chinese characters

Language codes
- ISO 639-3: None (mis)
- Glottolog: sanx1234
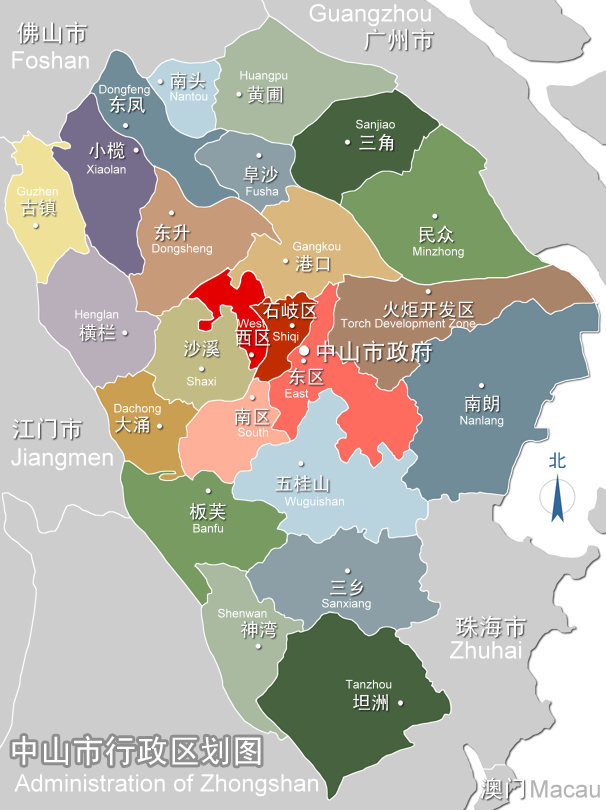
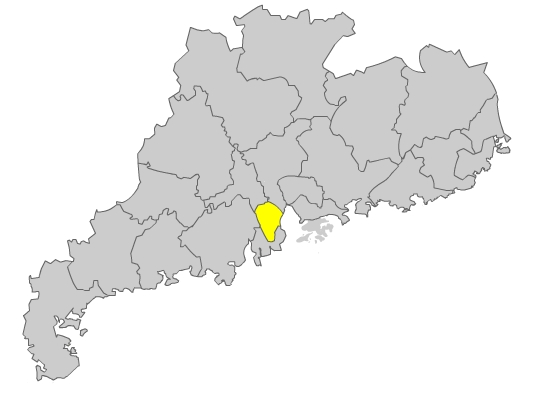
- Location of Sanxiang Town (三乡镇) within Zhongshan City (中山市), where Sanxiang dialect is spoken.

Sanxiang (Cantonese Jyutping: saam1hoeng1, in the language itself sa^{1} hiu^{1} [sa˧.hiu˧]) is a Min variety of Southern Min Chinese mostly spoken in Sanxiang in Zhongshan in the Pearl River Delta of Guangdong, China. Despite its close proximity, Sanxiang is not related to the surrounding dialects in the region, which belong to the Yue group, and thus forms a "dialect island" of Min speakers. It is one of three enclaves of Min in Zhongshan, the others being Longdu and Nanlang.

As Zhongshan Min (including Sanxiang) is surrounded by Cantonese, it gradually leads to the development of bilingualism among the people. As such, Cantonese influence can be found to some degrees in phonetics, vocabulary, and grammar. Vocabulary influence is the most significant, followed by phonetics, and the least influential being on the grammar.

== Variants ==
Not much differences are observed among villages in Sanxiang other than slight differences in pronunciation except for the divergent variant in Dabu (大布村). Most differences are observed in rimes and some vocabulary. For example, Zhangzhou final -ɛ as in the word 茶 is pronounced /tai/ in Sanxiang but /teə/ in Dabu. Same can be said for 坐 Sanxiang /tsai/; Dabu /tseə/. Any instances of -au in Sanxiang, becomes -ɔ in Dabu, including those cognate with Zhangzhou -o, such as in the words: 鹅学讲. Southern Min -ua remains in Sanxiang but becomes -oɔ after velar and labial initials or -iɔ elsewhere. 山 is /sua/ in Sanxiang but /siɔ/ in Dabu; likewise 歌 is /kua/ in Sanxiang but /koɔ/ in Dabu.

== Phonology ==
=== Initials ===
Sanxiang dialect has 18 initials.

		Bilabial	Alveolar		Velar	Glottal
		Bilabial	plain	sibilant	Velar	Glottal
Nasal		/m/ 梅孟目	/n/ 女南宁		/ŋ/ 牙外严	
Plosive/ Affricate	plain	/p/ 巴步白	/t/ 刀茶张	/ts/ 周展杂	/k/ 歌家计	/ʔ/ 安鸭沃
Plosive/ Affricate	aspirated	/pʰ/ 破片仆	/tʰ/ 涂谈沉	/tsʰ/ 千唱七	/kʰ/ 快欠曲	
Plosive/ Affricate	voiced	/b/ 买棉灭		/g/ (Note: Observed in Yagang Village (鸦岗村), now merged with Gangquan Village (岗泉村) since 2001.) (Note: In Pinglan (平岚村), [g] is a variant of [ŋ] which appears irregularly, such as "鹅" [gau⁵⁵], "牙" [gai⁵⁵], "吴" [go⁵⁵], etc.)		
Fricative	unvoiced	/f/ 费芳法		/s/ 山身赎		/h/ 海坑兄
Fricative	voiced			/z/ 认热日		
Lateral			/l/ 漏绿入			

=== Rimes ===
Sanxiang dialect has 69 rimes as observed in Wushi (乌石村).

Nucleus		-a-			-e-			-ɐ-		-o-		-ɔ-	-i-	-u-		-ai-	-au-		-ɐi-		-ɐu-		-oi-		-ou-	-ui-	-iu-	∅-
Medial		∅-	i-	u-	∅-	i-	u-	∅-	i-	∅-	i-	∅-	∅-	∅-	ø-	∅-	∅-	i-	∅-	u-	∅-	i-	∅-	u-	∅-	∅-	∅-	∅-
Coda	-∅	a 炒衫	ia 倚兄	ua 歌山	e 鞋买					o 河罗		ɔ 步楚	i 比许	u 素鱼		ai 巴千	au 左刀	iau 消条	ɐi 西桂	uɐi 惠	ɐu 沟愁	iɐu 舅由	oi 采帅	uoi 快卫	ou 某侯	ui 推算	iu 秋唱	
Coda	-ʔ	aʔ 答纳	iaʔ 食笛	uaʔ 辣热			ueʔ 刮月			oʔ 洛获	ioʔ 碧脚		iʔ 接			aiʔ 白客	auʔ 作学										iuʔ 尺石	
Coda	-m	am 南感			em 甜念	iem 险欠		ɐm 森审	iɐm 壬				im 渐心															m̩ 唔
Coda	-n	an 单阵		uan 弯幻				ɐn 恨论	iɐn 忍因	on 干汉			in 棉片	un 船云														
Coda	-ŋ	aŋ 冬梦		uaŋ 宏		ieŋ 承清		ɐŋ 崩冰		oŋ 江风	ioŋ 常龙				øuŋ 弓用													ŋ̍ 五
Coda	-p	ap 杂鸽			ep 帖	iep 竹十		ɐp 集习	iɐp 十涩				ip 业入															
Coda	-t	at 察法						ɐt 匹吉					it 灭节	ut 活出														
Coda	-k	ak 缚沃		uak 或		iek 则息		ɐk 突北		ok 各国	iok 削鹿				øuk 熟育													

Sanxiang dialect has 82 rimes as observed in Pinglan (平岚村), now split into modern day 平岚东村 and 平南村.

Nucleus		-a-			-e-			-ɐ-			-o-			-ɔ-		-i-	-u-	-ai-		-au-		-iu-	∅-
Medial		∅-	i-	u-	∅-	i-	u-	∅-	i-	u-	∅-	i-	u-	∅-	u-	∅-	∅-	∅-	u-	∅-	i-	∅-	∅-
Coda	-∅	a 饱	ia 野	ua 我	e 买						o 河			ɔ 补		i 米	u 浮	ai 来	uai 怀	au 炮	iau 数	iu 秋	
Coda	-ʔ	aʔ 拍	iaʔ 食	uaʔ 割			ueʔ 月				oʔ 阁	ioʔ 约				iʔ 篾		aiʔ 百		auʔ 落		iuʔ 石	
Coda	-j							ɐi 祭	iɐi 芮	uɐi 惠	oi 彩	ioi 锐	uoi 皮				ui 雷						
Coda	-w							ɐu 亩	iɐu 休		ou 毛												
Coda	-m	am 男	iam 签		em 甜			ɐm 森	iɐm 壬							im 林							m̩ 唔
Coda	-n	an 班		uan 弯				ɐn 文	iɐn 因	uɐn 军			uon 反	ɔn 汉		in 尘	un 本						
Coda	-ŋ	aŋ 房		uaŋ 宏	eŋ 凌	ieŋ 顶		ɐŋ 更			oŋ 风	ioŋ 肿		ɔŋ 帮	uɔŋ 往								ŋ̍ 五
Coda	-p	ap 纳	iap 劫		ep 贴	iep 汁		ɐp 集	iɐp 涩							ip 急							
Coda	-t	at 法						ɐt 术	iɐt 逸	uɐt 猾			uot 罚			it 笔	ut 末						
Coda	-k	ak 北		uak 或	ek 息	iek 劈		ɐk 适			ok 木	iok 育		ɔk 莫	uɔk 获								

A few rimes have only one character, such as: iɐi 芮, ioi 锐, uaŋ 宏, uak 或, m̩ 唔, etc.

=== Tones ===
Similar to Hokkien, Sanxiang dialect has 7 tones.

Tones	dark 阴				light 阳			
Tones	level 平	rising 上	departing 去	entering 入	level 平	rising 上	departing 去	entering 入
No.	1	2	3	4	5	6	7	8
Tone contour	˧ (33)	˩˧ (13)	˨˩˧ (213)	˨˩ (21)	˥ (55)	-	˩ (11)	˥˧ (53)
Example Hanzi	歌贪刀单	左底水讲	算唱庆送	杀结七竹	茶蛇甜团	(Note: Ancient voiced initial consonants in the rising tone (阳上) whether fully voiced (全浊上) or sonorant (次浊上), have inconsistently merged as the 上 tone [˩˧] (13) tone (such as “舵柱倍武” etc.); or became the 阴平 tone [˧] (33) tone (such as “杜坐五” etc.); while a few became the 阳去 tone [˩] (11) tone, such as “蚁” [hia˩].)	步话办漏	热滑绝十
Special Examples (Note: Some characters with 上 tone (mainly voiced 浊上), and 去 tone (mainly 阴去) is now pronounced with the 阴平 tone [˧] (33) in Sanxiang. There are no observable patterns. Some are believed to be the result of Cantonese 阴去 having the value [˧] (33). For more information, see the phonoligical features section below.)	户坐五雨 (Note: From historic 阳上 tone.) 事义外配 (Note: From historic 阳去 tone.)	舵柱倍舅武					蚁 农 (Note: From historic 阳平 tone.)	

Special examples note:

==== Tone Sandhi ====
Tone sandhi in Sanxiang applies in words with two or more characters. The following syllables are unaffected by tone sandhi:

- Function words
- Personal pronouns
- Demonstrative pronouns
- Negative adverbs
- Syllable before a vocal pause

Tones	dark 阴				light 阳			
Tones	level 平	rising 上	departing 去	entering 入	level 平	rising 上	departing 去	entering 入
Original Tone	˧ (33)	˩˧ (13)	˨˩˧ (213)	˨˩ (21)	˥ (55)	-	˩ (11)	˥˧ (53)
Resulting Tone	˧ (33)	˩ (11) (Note: Tone sandhi does not happen if 上声 tone is followed by 阳去. Example: 好事 /hɔ¹³.su¹¹/)	˧ (33)		˨˩ (21)	-	˧ (33)	˨ (2)
Example Words	生姜、 猪母、 妖怪、 花托、 葾头、 秦树、 骰目	炒惹、 草纸、 狗窦、 手骨、 马棚、 好事、 伙食	称星、 孝子、 厝契、 蒜汁、 算盘、 告示、 放学	插棋、 结茧、 竹扫、 竹壳、 栗萝、 八万、 竹窘	齐心、 人手、 鱼刺、 鱼骨、 油麻、 牛特、 鱼目		大声、 饭碗、 豆酱、 面铃、 大头、 豆鼓、 润月	学生、 石盾、 白菜、 目汁、 目皮、 墨现、 自鹤

=== Phonological features ===
Phonological features of the Sanxiang Dialect features several influence from nearby Yue languages and Hakka languages.

Compared to other Southern Min languages, the distinction of nasal vowels are lost in Sanxiang. Compare Hokkien 沙; sua with 山; suann and 油; iû with 羊; iûnn which are both /sua˧/ and /iu˥/ respectively in Sanxiang. Similarly, Leizhou dialect and Hainan dialect also lost nasal vowel distinction. As such, there are 7 rimes which resulted from the loss of nasal coda: -a (蓝担敢衫), -ai (前千还), -ia (听领命), -ua (山炭肝散), -i (钱变天扇), -iu (量梁想上), -ui (问村门砖)

Minimal pairs of nasalized rimes
Rime	-a		-ua		-ia		-iu		-i		-ui		-ai	
Word	纱	衫	沙	山	野	影	受	想	比	扁	围	黄	家	更
Sanxiang	sa	sa	sua	sua	ia	ia	siu	siu	pi	pi	ui	ui	kai	kai
Leizhou	sa	sa	sua	sua	ie	o	siu	sio	pi	pieŋ	ui	ui	ke	ke
Zhangzhou	sɛ	sã	sua	suã	ia	iã	siu	siɔ̃	pi	pĩ	ui	uĩ	kɛ	kɛ̃
Xiamen	sa	sã	sua	suã	ia	iã	siu	siũ	pi	pĩ	ui	ŋ̍	ke	kĩ

Some ancient voiced initial consonants in the rising tone (浊上) are now pronounced as either 阴平 tone or 上声 tone in Sanxiang. This pronunciation is very similar to that of Sanxiang Hakka. An explanation for 浊上, a significant portion of which are colloquial (白读) words, has not yet been found. In the Zhongshan dialect, there are few examples of ancient voiced initial consonants in the rising tone that are now pronounced as 阴平 tone, but examples that are pronounced in the 上声 tone are very easy to find. Unlike in Mandarin, this pattern does not correspond to whether the initial is fully voiced (全浊上) or sonorant (次浊上).

By comparison, in Zhangzhou, Fuzhou, and other Min dialects, this overall pronunciation pattern is generally absent, except for a few words with ancient voiced sonorant initials (次浊) that are read as 上声 tone today. In most cases, it corresponds to the 阳去 tone.

Word	买	咬	坐	近	断	杜	舅	柱	社
Sanxiang	be	ka	t͡sai	kin	tui	tu	kʰiɐu	t͡sʰi	sia
Sanxiang	阴平						上声		
Sanxiang Hakka	mai	ŋau	t͡sʰo	kʰiun	tʰon	tʰu	kʰiɛu	t͡sʰu	sia
Sanxiang Hakka	阴平					去声	阴平	上声	
Zhangzhou	be	ka	t͡se	kin	tuĩ	tɔ	ku	tʰiau	sia
Zhangzhou	上声	阳去							
Fuzhou	mɛ	kɑ	suɑi	køyŋ	tuɑŋ	tou	kiɛu	tʰiɛu	siɑ
Fuzhou	上声	阳去							
Wenzhou	ma	ŋuɔ	zo	dʑaŋ	daŋ	døy	dʑau	dzɿ	zei
Wenzhou	阳上								

==== Min features ====
Middle Chinese initial "非敷奉" are pronounced as either [p] or [pʰ] on Sanxiang's colloquial reading (白读).

Rime set	非		敷	奉			
Word	分	粪	蜂	肥	妇	浮	缚
Sanxiang	pun	pun	pʰaŋ	pui	pu	pʰu	pak
Xiamen	pun	pun	pʰaŋ	pui	pu	pʰu	pak
Fuzhou	puoŋ	puoŋ	pʰuŋ	puoi	pou	pʰu	puoʔ
Longdu	puɵn	pun	pʰoŋ	puɵi	pu	pʰu	pɔk

Middle Chinese initial "知撤澄" are pronounced as either [t] or [tʰ] on Sanxiang's colloquial reading (白读), a trait uniquely shared by other Min languages.

Rime set	知		撤	澄			
Word	猪	张	拆	茶	绸	沉	郑
Sanxiang	tu	tiu	tʰiaʔ	tai	tiu	tʰim	tai
Xiamen	ti	tiũ	tʰiaʔ	tai	tiu	tʰim	tĩ
Fuzhou	ty	tuoŋ	tʰiɑʔ	ta	tieu	tʰɛiŋ	tɑŋ
Longdu	ti	tiɔŋ	tʰ-	ta	tiu	tʰɐm	tɐŋ

Similar to other Southern Min languages, some Middle Chinese initial 日、疑、云 are pronounced as [h] on Sanxiang's colloquial reading (白读), a trait not shared by other Zhongshan Min (Longdu dialect and Nanlang dialect) which are part of Eastern Min.

Rime set	日		疑			云			
Word	箬	耳	蚁	鱼	瓦	云	园	熊	雨
Sanxiang	hioʔ	hi	hia	hi	hia	hun	hui	him	hɔ
Zhangzhou	hioʔ	hĩ	hia	hi	hia	hun	huĩ	hiɪŋ	hɔ
Fuzhou	nuoʔ	ŋɛi	ŋiɛ	ŋy	ŋuɑ	huŋ	huoŋ	hyŋ	huɔ
Longdu	nɵʔ	ŋi	ŋiɛ	ŋi	ŋa	un	fɔn	hoŋ	fuɔ

==== Unique features ====
One unique feature of Zhongshan Min, including Sanxiang dialect, is the presence of the consonant /f/ which is absent in much of the Min languages, likely to be of Cantonese borrowing. In Cantonese and Hakka, these /f/ result from rounded vowels. However, this pattern is not as consistent in Sanxiang. The Middle Chinese 三十六字母 (36 initials) correspondence of the initial 非敷奉溪晓匣 in the literary reading (文读) of Sanxiang dialect is as follows:

Irregular occurrence of Sanxiang /f/ in comparison with Middle Chinese initial set
Initial set	非			敷			奉		溪			晓				匣	
Word	肺	法	方	芳	费	翻	负	凡	庆	去	科	希	灰	徽	忽	寒	户
Sanxiang	hui	fat̚	foŋ	foŋ	fɐi	fan	hu	fan	hɐŋ	hi	fo	hi	fui	fɐi	fɐt̚	hɔn	fu
Longdu	hui/fui	fat̚	fɔŋ	fɔŋ	fɐi	fan	hu	fan	hɐŋ	kʰi	fɔ	hi	hui	fɐi	uɐt̚	hɔn	fu
Cantonese	fɐi̯	faːt̚	fɔːŋ	fɔːŋ	fɐi̯	faːn	fuː	faːn	hɪŋ	hɵy̯	fɔː	hei̯	fuːi̯	fɐi̯	fɐt̚	hɔːn	wuː
Hakka	fui	fat̚	fɔŋ	fɔŋ	fui	fan	fu	fan	hin	hi	fo		foi	fui			fu
Xiamen	hui	huat̚	hɔŋ	hɔŋ	hui	huan	hu	huan	kʰiɪŋ	kʰi	kʰo	hi	hue	hui	hut̚	han	hɔ

Another uniquely Sanxiang feature is the presence of the rime -ai and -au on some characters which corresponds to the Middle Chinese rimes 麻二 and 歌三 on the rime group (攝). Sanxiang -ai and -au usually corresponds to Zhangzhou Hokkien rimes -ɛ and -o.

Sanxiang open rime diphthongization
Rime set	果			假				
Word	左	婆	坐	巴	茶	家	虾	牙
Sanxiang	t͡sau	pau	t͡sai	pai	tai	kai	hai	ŋai
Zhangzhou	t͡so	po	t͡se	pa	tɛ	kɛ	hɛ	ɡɛ
Cantonese	t͡sɔː	pʰɔː	t͡sʰɔː	paː	t͡sʰaː	kaː	haː	ŋaː

This pattern with Zhangzhou dialect would continue on rimes with glottal stop -ʔ and on Zhangzhou's nasalized rimes.

Word	星	郑	白	客	作	恶	学
Sanxiang	t͡sʰai	tai	paiʔ	kʰaiʔ	t͡sauʔ	auʔ	auʔ
Zhangzhou	t͡sʰɛ̃	tɛ̃	pɛʔ	kʰɛʔ	t͡soʔ	oʔ	oʔ

Sometimes, some words can have irregular changes, such as 千 [t͡sʰai˧]

==== Cantonese Influence ====
Sanxiang's Cantonese influence can be seen in the occurrence of the vowel /ɐ/.

Minimal pairs of the vowel /a/ and /ɐ/
/a/ vs /ɐ/	-i		-u		-m		-p		-n		-t	
Word	拜	闭	高	沟	三	心	杂	集	慢	敏	札	质
Sanxiang	pai	pɐi	kau	kɐu	sam	sɐm	t͡sap̚	t͡sɐp̚	man	mɐn	t͡sat̚	t͡sɐt̚
Cantonese	paːi̯	pɐi̯	kou̯	kʰɐu̯	saːm	sɐm	t͡saːp̚	t͡saːp̚	maːn	mɐn	t͡saːt̚	t͡sɐt̚
Xiamen	pai	pi	kau	kau	sam	sim	t͡sap̚	t͡sip̚	ban	bin	t͡sat̚	t͡sit̚

In Wushi (乌石村), there are unique rimes øuŋ and øuk corresponding to Cantonese ʊŋ and ʊk or Taishanese ɵŋ and ɵk.

Rime	-øuŋ				-øuk		
Word	钟	弓	穷	用	熟	育	郁
Wushi	t͡søuŋ	køuŋ	køuŋ	øuŋ	søuk̚	øuk̚	øuk̚
Pinglan		kioŋ	kioŋ		siok̚	iok̚	
Taishanese	t͡sɵŋ	kɵŋ	kʰɵŋ	jɵŋ	sɵk̚	jɵk̚	
Cantonese	t͡sʊŋ	kʊŋ	kʰʊŋ	jʊŋ	sʊk̚	jʊk̚	jʊk̚

== Grammar ==
=== Pronoun ===
==== Personal pronouns ====
Personal pronoun in Sanxiang dialect is similar to Teochew dialect. Plural forms of pronouns are achieved by suffixing -侬. Like other Southern Min languages, there is a distinction between an inclusive and exclusive we.

Personal Pronouns in Sanxiang
	Singular		Plural		
1st person	我	ua¹³	Inclusive	咱侬	lan¹³⁻¹¹ naŋ⁵⁵
1st person	我	ua¹³	Exclusive	我侬	ua¹³⁻¹¹ naŋ⁵⁵
2nd person	汝	li¹³	汝侬		li¹³⁻¹¹ naŋ⁵⁵
3rd person	伊	i³³	伊侬		i³³ naŋ⁵⁵

Sanxiang has the reflexive pronoun 家己 /ka³³ ki¹¹/ similar to Southern Min.

Dual pronouns can be achieved by suffixing 两侬 /nɐu³³ naŋ⁵⁵/ onto singular pronouns similar to Hokkien, equivalent to 俩 in Mandarin. Example: 伊两侬 /i³³ nɐu³³ naŋ⁵⁵/ (他俩; they both).

==== Possessive pronouns ====
The possessives are consistently expressed by suffixing 嘅 /ɐi⁵⁵/ after a subject. Example: 阿李嘅大佬 (小李的哥哥; Little Li’s older brother), 侬嘅事干 (别人的事儿; someone else’s business).

==== Demonstrative pronouns ====
Unlike other Southern Min languages, Sanxiang makes a three-way distinction between the demonstratives, namely the proximals and the distals with the addition of further distal. The basic determiners are 喺 /hɐi¹³/ "this" and 许 /hu¹³/ "that", and for further distances 许头 /hu¹³⁻¹¹ tʰau⁵⁵/. They require at least a classifier and can be optionally preceded by a numeral.

Sanxiang Demonstratives
		Proximal		Distal		Further	
General	Singular	喺个	hɐi¹³ kɐi⁵⁵	许个	hu¹³ kɐi⁵⁵	许头阿个	hu¹³ tʰau⁵⁵⁻²¹ ɔ³³ kɐi⁵⁵
General	Collective	喺兮	hɐi¹³ ai⁵⁵	许兮	hu¹³ ai⁵⁵	许头一囝	hu¹³ tʰau⁵⁵⁻²¹ it²¹⁻³³ kia¹³
Spatial		喺兮	hɐi¹³ ai⁵⁵	许兮	hu¹³ ai⁵⁵	许头	hu¹³ tʰau⁵⁵
Spatial		喺片地	hɐi¹³ pʰan²¹³⁻³³ tɐi¹¹	许片地	hu¹³ pʰan²¹³⁻³³ tɐi¹¹	许头	hu¹³ tʰau⁵⁵
Temporal		喺阵时	hɐi¹³ t͡sin¹¹⁻³³ si⁵⁵	许阵时	hu¹³ t͡sin¹¹⁻³³ si⁵⁵		

==== Interrogative pronouns ====
Zhongshan Min retains the usage of "底", adding it before certain pronouns to express interrogative:

Sanxiang Interrogative Pronouns
who / whom		底侬	te¹³⁻¹¹ naŋ⁵⁵
which	singular	底个	te¹³⁻¹¹ kɐi⁵⁵
which	collective	底兮	te¹³⁻¹¹ ai⁵⁵
where		底	te¹³
when		乜时候	
what		乜儗	
what (kind of) + noun		怎形	
how many; how much		几	kui¹³

=== Numeral ===
Across all Min languages, there are two pronunciations for 一 and 二 across dialects. When used for denoting quantities in Sanxiang, the pronunciation 一 /tit̚²¹/ and 两 /nɐu³³/ are used. The contrast between the two pronunciations (numeral vs quantity) can be seen in the following example:

Rime	Numeral		Quantity	
Word	第一	第二	一斗	两张
Sanxiang	tai³³ it̚²¹	tai³³ zi¹¹	tit̚²¹⁻³³ tau¹³	nɐu³³ tiu³³
Zhangzhou	te²²⁻²¹ it̚³²	te²²⁻²¹ d͡zi²²	t͡sit̚¹²¹⁻²¹ tau⁵³	nɔ̃²²⁻²¹ tiɔ̃⁴⁴
Fuzhou	tɛ²⁴²⁻⁵³ ɛiʔ²⁴	tɛ²⁴²⁻⁵³ nˡɛi²⁴²	suoʔ⁵⁻³³ (t-)lau³³	l̃aŋ²⁴²⁻⁵⁵ (t-)nuoŋ⁵⁵

Generally, 一 /it̚²¹/ and 二 /zi¹¹/ are used for:

- Ordinal number: 第一, 第二
- Counting tens or less: 二十四, 十一

While 一 /tit̚²¹/ and 两 /nɐu³³/ are used for:

- Denoting amount/ quantity: 一斗, 两张
- Counting larger than tens: 两百, 一万

Aside from that, Sanxiang has additional pronunciations of 一 /iɐk̚²¹/ and 二 /ŋi¹¹/ as the surrounding Shiqi (石岐) or Xiafang (下方) Cantonese. Same can be said about the origin for the literary pronunciation (文读) of 四.

Sanxiang Numeral
Numeral		1 一	2 二	3 三	4 四	5 五	6 六	7 七	8 八	9 九	10 十
Sanxiang	文	it̚²¹	zi¹¹	sam³³	si¹¹	ŋ̍³³	lok̚⁵³	t͡sʰat̚²¹	pat̚²¹	kau¹¹	siɐp̚⁵³
Sanxiang	白	iɐk̚²¹	ŋi¹¹	sa³³	si²¹³	ŋɔ¹¹	lak̚⁵³	t͡sʰit̚²¹	paiʔ²¹	kau¹³	t͡siep̚⁵³
Zhangzhou	文	it̚³²	d͡zi²²	sam⁴⁴	su²¹	ŋɔ̃⁵³	liɔk̚¹²¹	t͡sʰit̚³²	pat̚³²	kiu⁵³	sip̚¹²¹
Zhangzhou	白	t͡sit̚¹²¹	d͡zi²²	sã⁴⁴	si²¹	ɡɔ²²	lak̚¹²¹	t͡sʰit̚³²	peʔ³²	kau⁵³	t͡sap̚¹²¹
Fuzhou	文	ɛiʔ²⁴	nˡɛi²⁴²	saŋ⁵⁵	søy²¹³	ŋu³³	l̃øyʔ⁵	t͡sʰɛiʔ²⁴	paiʔ²⁴	kieu³³	sɛiʔ⁵
Fuzhou	白	suoʔ⁵	nɑ²⁴²	saŋ⁵⁵	sɛi²¹³	ŋou²⁴²	l̃øyʔ⁵	t͡sʰɛiʔ²⁴	paiʔ²⁴	kau³³	sɛiʔ⁵

Approximate numbers are mostly expressed with 零 /leŋ⁵⁵/, such as: 十零个 (十几个; a dozen or so), 百零侬 (百来人; a hundred or so people), 三十零个猪 (三十多只猪; thirty or so pigs).

The word 一 /tit̚²¹/ can usually be omitted in the following cases:

- Before 百、千、万......: 一百(千、万......)几十 is said as 百(千、万......)几十. As is common in Sinitc languages, the next quantifier can also be omitted. For example, 一百一十, 一百几十, and 一万七千 can simply be said as 百一, 一百几十, and 万七. However this only applies to round numbers. 一百一十四 must be said fully as /tit̚²¹ paiʔ²¹ it̚²¹ t͡siep̚⁵³ si²¹³/.
- Before classifiers (量词): It can usually be omitted unless the amount is emphasized, similar to Yue and Hakka. For example: 借我管书 (借我一本书吧; lend me a book); 伊食噤条鱼 (他吃了一条鱼; he ate a fish).

English	Mandarin	Zhangzhou	Sanxiang	Cantonese	Meixian
Give me a book	给我一本书	予我一本册	放本书我	畀本书我	分本书𠊎
Tell him	跟他说一声	讲一声予伊听	讲声伊听	讲声佢听	讲声佢听

=== Verb ===
Like other Sinitic languages, Sanxiang is an aspect heavy, analytic language.

==== Aspect ====
Aspect	Sanxiang	Zhangzhou	Cantonese	Mandarin	Type
Progressive	紧 /kin¹¹/	哩 /li⁴⁴/	喺度 /hɐi̯³⁵ tou̯²²/	正(在)	Prefix
Continuous	紧 /kin¹¹/	咧 /lɛʔ³²/	紧 /kɐn³⁵/	着	Suffix
Perfective	噤/直 /kɐm²¹³; tit²¹/	矣 /a²¹/	咗 /t͡sɔː³⁵/	了	Suffix
Experiential	过 /kuoi²¹³/	过 /kue²¹/	过 /kʷɔː³³/	过	Suffix
Delimitative	下 /ai¹¹/	一下 /t͡sit̚¹²¹⁻²¹ ɛ²²/	一下 /jɐt̚⁵ haː¹/	一下	Suffix
Continuative	也 /ia¹¹/	犹(佫) /iau⁵³⁻⁴⁴ koʔ³²/	重 /t͡sʰʊŋ¹³/	还	Prefix
Inchoative	浮/开 /pʰu¹¹; kʰui¹¹/		起(…)嚟 /hei̯³⁵ lɐi̯²¹/	起(…)来	Suffix

The word 紧 /kin¹¹/ has two functions in Sanxiang:

- It marks progressive aspect if prefixed on verbs. Progressive aspect indicates an action or change that is in progress.

伊 眯 紧 去 眠床 睇 书。
i³³ mi³³ kin¹¹⁻³³ hi²¹³⁻³³ {bin⁵⁵⁻²¹ t͡sʰou⁵⁵} tʰɐi¹³⁻¹¹ t͡su³³.
3SG sleep PROG {go to} bed see book
'He is lying in bed reading a book.'

(cf. Mandarin Chinese: 他正躺在床上看书。)

- Unlike other Zhongshan Min, it can mark continuous aspect if prefixed on verbs. Continuous aspect indicates an action or state that is maintained.

门喙 徛 紧 两 个 侬。
{mui⁵⁵⁻²¹ t͡sʰui²¹³} kʰia³³ kin¹¹⁻³³ nɐu³³ kɐi⁵⁵⁻²¹ naŋ⁵⁵.
doorway stand CONT two CL person
'Two people are standing at the door.'

(cf. Mandarin Chinese: 门口站着两个人。)

Perfective aspect is marked by 噤 /kɐm²¹³/ or 直 /tit²¹/. Both are interchangeable. They indicate that the action is in a completed state, and have little to do with the time the action occurred.

汝 交 直/噤 钱 未 啊？
li¹³ kau³³ {kɐm²¹³/tit²¹} t͡sʰi⁵⁵ boi¹¹ a.
2SG pay PFV money NEG MOD
'Have you paid the money?'

(cf. Mandarin Chinese: 你交了钱没有？)

噤 /kɐm²¹³/ or 直 /tit²¹/ can also be used after adjectives to indicate the completion of a change in quality or state. In such sentences, the adjective's function is similar to that of a verb:

我 件 衫 旧 噤。
ua¹³ kin¹¹⁻³³ sa³³ ku¹¹⁻³³ kɐm²¹³.
1SG CL shirt old PFV
'My shirt is old.'

(cf. Mandarin Chinese: 我这件衣服旧了。)

Experiential aspect works the same as Mandarin, Hokkien, and Cantonese:

我 食 过 蕉只 同 荔枝。
ua¹³ t͡siaʔ⁵³⁻² kuoi²¹³⁻³³ {t͡siu³³ t͡si¹³} taŋ⁵⁵ {lai¹¹ ki³³.}
1SG eat EXP banana and lychee
'We've eaten bananas and lychees.'

(cf. Mandarin Chinese: 我们吃过香蕉和荔枝。)

Delimitative aspect can be expressed by suffixing 下 /ai¹¹/:

汝侬 估 下 灯。
{li¹³⁻¹¹ naŋ⁵⁵} kɔ¹³⁻¹¹ ai¹¹⁻³³ tieŋ³³.
2PL guess DEL lantern
'Try to guess the lantern riddle.'

(cf. Mandarin Chinese: 你们猜一猜灯谜。)

Continuative aspect is indicated with 也 /ia¹¹/, the only one to do so amongst other Zhongshan Min. It represent actions that are still happening, similar to Mandarin 还:

鼎 也 有 饭 抑 无？
tia¹³ ia¹¹ u¹¹ pui¹¹ aʔ⁵³⁻² mɐu⁵⁵.
pot inside EXIST rice or NEG
'Is there still any rice left in the pot?'

(cf. Mandarin Chinese: 锅里还有饭没有？)

A unique trait of Sanxiang, like other Zhongshan Min, is the inchoative aspect. It is done by suffixing 浮 or 开:

伊 一 哭 浮/开 就 唔 停 啦。
i³³ tit̚²¹⁻³³ kʰau²¹³⁻³³ {pʰu¹¹/kʰui¹¹} t͡sɐu³³ m̩¹¹ tʰieŋ⁵⁵⁻²¹ la³³.
3SG once cry INCH then NEG stop MOD
'Once he/she starts to cry, he/she doesn't stop.'

(cf. Mandarin Chinese: 她一哭起来就没完没了。)

Some aspects requires a special syntax, such as the iterative aspect: A + 下 + A + 下

讲下讲下， 伊两侬 拍浮交 (上来)。
{kou¹³⁻¹¹ ai¹¹⁻³³ kou¹³⁻¹¹ ai¹¹⁻³³,} {i³³ nɐu³³ naŋ⁵⁵} {pʰaʔ²¹ pʰu¹¹⁻³³ kau³³} {(tsiu¹¹⁻³³ lai⁵⁵)}.
speak-ITER 3DU fight-INCH (INCH)
'While talking over and over again, they started fighting.'

(cf. Mandarin Chinese: 谈着说着，他俩打起架来。)

==== Non-monosyllabic verbs ====
For non monosyllabic verbs, if the verb consist of verb-noun complement, then any complements are to be put directly after the verb and before the noun:

內底 开紧会。
{lɐi¹¹⁻³³ te¹³⁻¹¹} {kʰui¹¹⁻³³ kin¹¹⁻³³ ui³³}.
inside {hold a meeting-CONT}
'A meeting is taking place inside.'

(cf. Mandarin Chinese: 里面正在开会。)

伊 食 噤 饭。
i³³ t͡siaʔ⁵³⁻² kɐm²¹³⁻³³ pui¹¹.
3SG eat PFV rice
'He ate rice.'

(cf. Mandarin Chinese: 他吃了饭。)

伊 食 开 烟 唔 食 唔得。
i³³ t͡siaʔ⁵³⁻² kʰui¹¹ in³³ m̩¹¹ t͡siaʔ⁵³⁻² {m̩¹¹ tit̚²¹}.
3SG eat INCH cigarette NEG eat {won't do}
'He can't stop smoking once he starts.'

(cf. Mandarin Chinese: 里面正在开会。)

==== Other Complements ====
Type	Sanxiang	Zhangzhou	Cantonese	Mandarin	Note
Gnomic	有 /u¹¹/	有 /u²²/	有 /jɐu̯¹³/	(Note: Mandarin typically has no gnomic, the use of 有 for such cases is uncommon.)	Prefix, emphasizes an action has been done.
Resultative	到 /tau¹³/	著 /tioʔ¹²¹/	到 /tou̯³⁵/	到	Suffix, indicates successful completion of an action.
Exhaustion	澈 /tʰɐiʔ²¹/	了了 /liau⁵³⁻⁴⁴ liau⁵³/ (Note: Also less commonly 澈澈 in Hokkien.)	嗮 /saːi̯³³/	光(光) (Note: Also 光了 in Mandarin.)	Suffix, indicates exhaustion of verbs resulting in nothing left.
Priority	就先 /t͡sɐu³³ sai³³/	先 /siɪŋ⁴⁴/	先 /siːn⁵⁵/	先 (Note: Unlike other languages, 先 is a prefix in Mandarin.)	Equivalent to 先 in Mandarin.

Similar to Cantonese and Hokkien, Sanxiang dialect can convey gnomic aspect. This is done by prefixing verbs with 有 /u¹¹/:

我 有 买 火水。
ua¹³ u¹¹⁻³³ be³³ {hoi¹³⁻¹¹ tsui¹³.}
1SG GNO buy kerosene
'I bought kerosene.'

(cf. Mandarin Chinese: 我买了煤油。)

The negative of gnomic is achieved by 无 /mɐu⁵⁵/:

伊 无 转 学堂。
i³³ mɐu⁵⁵⁻²¹ t͡sin¹³⁻¹¹ {auʔ⁵³⁻² tou⁵⁵}.
3SG GNO-NEG go school
'He didn't go to school.'

(cf. Mandarin Chinese: 他没去上学。)

Sanxiang, similar to Cantonese and Mandarin, uses 到 to indicate a successful completion of an action:

我 收 到 汝 嘅 信。
ua¹³ siu³³ tau¹³⁻¹¹ li¹³ ɐi⁵⁵⁻²¹ sin²¹³.
1SG receive RES 2SG POSS letter
'I received your letter.'

(cf. Mandarin Chinese: 我收到你的信。)

Similar to Cantonese, the inability to achieve a successful completion of an action is indicated with 唔到 /m̩¹¹ tau¹³/:

囥 紧 伫 底？ 我 揾 唔 到。
kʰɐu¹¹⁻³³ kin¹¹⁻³³ tu³³ te¹³? ua¹³ uɐn¹³⁻¹¹ m̩¹¹ tau¹³.
hide CONT in where 1SG search NEG RES
'Where is it hidden? I can't find it.'

(cf. Mandarin Chinese: 藏着在哪里？我找不到。)

Sanxiang can indicate exhaustion with the suffix 澈(澈), denoting that there are no objects left upon completion of the action:

食 澈 配， 唔好 隔暝。
t͡siaʔ⁵³⁻² tʰɐiʔ²¹⁻³³ pʰui³³ {m¹¹ hɐu¹³⁻¹¹} {kaiʔ²¹⁻³³ mɐi⁵⁵.}
eat completely dish NEG-IMP overnight
'Eat all the food, don't leave it overnight.'

(cf. Mandarin Chinese: 把菜吃光，别留隔夜。)

伊侬 将 鸡汤 都 饮 澈澈。
{i³³ naŋ⁵⁵} t͡siɔŋ³³ {ke³³ tʰou³³} tɔ³³ ŋim¹³⁻¹¹ {tʰɐiʔ²¹⁻³³ tʰɐiʔ²¹.}
3PL PREP {chicken soup} all drink completely
'They ate all the chicken soup completely.'

(cf. Mandarin Chinese: 他们把鸡汤都喝光了。)

It can also be used in certain expression such as 多谢澈 /to³³ t͡sia²¹³⁻³³ tʰɐiʔ²¹/ (非常感谢; Thank you very much!).

In Sanxiang, 就先 /t͡sɐu³³ sai³³/ or 做先 /t͡sɐu²¹³⁻³³ sai³³/ has multiple functions:

- Indicates that an action occurs before the related action

我 已经 食 噤 一 碗 就先 啦。
ua¹³ {i¹³⁻¹¹ kieŋ³³} t͡siaʔ⁵³⁻² kɐm²¹³⁻³³ tit̚²¹⁻³³ ua¹³⁻¹¹ {t͡sɐu³³ sai³³} la³³.
1SG already eat PFV one bowl first MOD
'I have already eaten a bowl.'

(cf. Mandarin Chinese: 我已经先吃了一碗了。)

- Indicates that a certain situation should be addressed temporarily, and other matters should be discussed later.

我 都 要 食 转 一 碗 做先。
ua¹³ tɔ³³ iu³³ t͡siaʔ⁵³⁻² t͡sin¹³⁻¹¹ tit̚²¹⁻³³ ua¹³⁻¹¹ {t͡sɐu²¹³⁻³³ sai³³}.
1SG always need eat up one bowl first
'I need to eat a bowl first.'

(cf. Mandarin Chinese: 我都要先吃上一碗。)

- Indicates that a certain situation needs to be clarified first, and other matters should be discussed later.

讲 清楚 是 底侬 拍 底侬 做先。
kou¹³ {t͡sʰieŋ³³ t͡sʰɔ¹³⁻¹¹} si¹¹⁻³³ {te¹³⁻¹¹ naŋ⁵⁵} pʰaʔ²¹⁻³³ {te¹³⁻¹¹ naŋ⁵⁵} {t͡sɐu²¹³⁻³³ sai³³.}
say clear COP who hit who first
'Make it clear who hit whom first.'

(cf. Mandarin Chinese: 说明白是谁打谁呀。)

The usage of 得 differ amongst the Zhongshan Min languages:

Function	Mandarin	Zhangjiabian	Nanlang	Longdu	Sanxiang	Example (Nanlang)
Connect verb with degree of complement	得	得	得 tit̚⁵	得 tit̚⁵	得 tit̚²¹	许个查某囝生得貌貌貌貌。
Expressing ability (interrogative)	能	得	得 tit̚⁵	得 tit̚⁵	得 tit̚²¹	伊捌得抑(是)唔捌得？
Expressing ability	行	会	得 tit̚⁵	得 tit̚⁵	得 tit̚²¹	写字计数伊都得。
Expressing possibility (Complements required)	可能	得/好	得 tit̚⁵	好 hou²⁴	来 lai⁵⁵	先下有得做，无得食。
Expressing authorization	可以	得	得 tit̚⁵	?	?	你早晏来都得。

In Sanxiang, the usage of 得 is as follows:

- Connecting verbs with a degree complement:

许个 查某囝 生 得 貌貌貌貌。
{hu¹³ kɐi⁵⁵⁻²¹} {t͡sam³³ mou¹³⁻¹¹ kia¹³} sai³³ tit²¹⁻³³ {mau³³ mau³³ mau³³ mau³³.}
that girl look is {extremely beautiful}
'That girl is extremely beautiful.'

(cf. Mandarin Chinese: 那个女孩儿长得特別漂亮。)

- Less commonly, it can used as a verb suffix without complements, indicating ability:

伊 捌 得 抑是 唔 捌 得？
i³³ pit²¹⁻³³ tit²¹⁻³³ {a³³ si¹¹⁻³³} m̩¹¹ pit²¹⁻³³ tit²¹.
he know can or NEG know can
'Can he recognize him?'

(cf. Mandarin Chinese: 他认不认得？)

- In Sanxing, such verb suffix indicating ability can be used to end sentences:

写字 算数 记账， 伊 都 做 得。
{sia¹³⁻¹¹ t͡si¹¹⁻³³} {sui²¹³⁻³³ siau²¹³⁻³³} {ki²¹³⁻³³ t͡sioŋ²¹³⁻³³,} i³³ tɔ³³ t͡sɐu²¹³⁻³³ tit²¹.
writing arithmetic bookkeeping she all do can
'Writing, arithmetic, and bookkeeping, she's good at all of them.'

(cf. Mandarin Chinese: 写字算数记账，她都行。)

While Sanxiang shares the same gnomic "有" function with Min and Yue, it has an additional syntax 有来 + Verb to affirm the existence of an action, similar to Cantonese "有得":

早阵时 有来 做 无来 食。
{t͡sa¹³⁻¹¹ t͡sin¹¹⁻³³ si⁵⁵⁻²¹} {u¹¹⁻³³ lai⁵⁵⁻²¹} t͡sɐu²¹³⁻³³ {mɐu⁵⁵⁻²¹ lai⁵⁵⁻²¹} t͡siaʔ⁵³.
past EXIST do NEG-EXIST eat
'In the past, there was something to do, but nothing to eat.'

(cf. Mandarin Chinese: 过去有的做，没的吃。)

=== Negation ===
Sanxiang has multiple negations:

Sanxiang	Zhangzhou	Cantonese	Mandarin	Note
唔 /m̩¹¹/	毋 /m̩²²/	唔 /m̩²¹/	不	Can be placed after verbs if followed by adjective.
无 /mɐu⁵⁵/	无 /bo¹³/	冇 /mou̯¹³/	没	
唔好 /m̩¹¹ hɐu¹³/	莫 /mãi²¹/	唔好 /m̩²¹ hou̯³⁵/	别	Interchangeable with the contracted form 孬 /mɐu¹³/.
未 /boi¹¹/	未 /bue²²/	未 /mei̯²²/	没 (Note: Mandarin has no specific word to convey the meaning of "not yet". 没、没有、不曾 can all convey the meaning. The usage of 未 is uncommon in Mandarin.)	Interchangeable with both 唔曾 /m¹¹ t͡sieŋ⁵⁵/ and 未曾 /boi¹¹ t͡sieŋ⁵⁵/.

唔 is used like how it is in Cantonese, similar to Mandarin 不.

我 唔 睇 大戏， 我 睇 电视。
ua¹³ m¹¹ tʰɐi¹³⁻¹¹ {tua¹¹⁻³³ kʰui²¹³,} ua¹³ tʰɐi¹³⁻¹¹ {tin¹¹⁻³³ si³³}.
1SG NEG see {Cantonese Opera} 1SG see television
'I don't watch Cantonese opera, I want to watch television.'

(cf. Mandarin Chinese: 我不看粤剧，我想看电视。)

唔 can be placed after verbs if followed by adjective which directly complements the verb.

听 唔 清楚 就 唔好 讲。
tʰia³³ m¹¹ {t͡sʰieŋ³³ t͡sʰɔ¹³⁻¹¹} t͡sɐu³³ {m¹¹ hɐu¹³⁻¹¹} kou¹³.
listen NEG clear then NEG-IMP say
'Don't say (a thing) if you don't hear it clearly.'

(cf. Mandarin Chinese: 没听清楚就别说。)

Another negative in Sanxiang is 无, used similarly to Cantonese 冇 and Mandarin 没.

无 食 过 就 食 加 一囝。
mɐu⁵⁵⁻²¹ t͡siaʔ⁵³⁻² kuoi²¹³⁻³³ t͡sɐu³³ t͡siaʔ⁵³⁻² ka³³ {tit̚²¹⁻³³ kia¹³.}
NEG eat EXP then eat more {a bit}
'If you haven't eaten it, eat a little more.'

(cf. Mandarin Chinese: 没吃过就多吃一点儿吧。)

Negative imperative is expressed with 唔好 similar to Cantonese.

唔好 帮 伊 讲。
{m¹¹ hɐu¹³⁻¹¹} pɔŋ⁵⁵⁻²¹ i³³ kou¹³.
NEG-IMP help 1SG speak
'Don't help him speak.'

(cf. Mandarin Chinese: 别帮他说话。)

孬 /mɐu¹³/ is a contraction of 唔好 /m̩¹¹⁻³³ hɐu¹³/, and both are interchangeable.

听 唔 清楚 就 孬 讲。
tʰia³³ m¹¹ {t͡sʰieŋ³³ t͡sʰɔ¹³⁻¹¹} t͡sɐu³³ mɐu¹³ kou¹³.
listen NEG clear then NEG-IMP say
'Don't say (a thing) if you don't hear it clearly.'

(cf. Mandarin Chinese: 没听清楚就别说。)

未 is used similarly to how it is used in Cantonese and Hokkien, conveying the meaning "not yet".

天 未 光 伊 就 出 噤 去。
tʰi³³ boi¹¹ kui³³ i³³ t͡sɐu³³ t͡sʰut²¹⁻³³ kɐm²¹³ hi²¹³.
sky NEG-SEM bright 3SG already {go out} PFV AND
'He even went out before dawn.'

(cf. Mandarin Chinese: 天没亮他就出门了。)

“唔曾” and “未曾” are both used interchangeably in Zhongshan Min dialect. Like “未”, they are placed at the end of a sentence to form an interrogative sentence.

汝 去 过 北京 唔曾 /未 /未曾？
li¹³ hi²¹³⁻³³ kuoi²¹³⁻³³ {pak²¹⁻³³ kieŋ³³} {m¹¹ t͡sieŋ⁵⁵} /boi¹¹ {/boi¹¹ t͡sieŋ⁵⁵}.
2SG go EXP Beijing NEG-SEM /NEG-SEM /NEG-SEM
'Have you been to Beijing?'

(cf. Mandarin Chinese: 你去过北京吗？)

Negation comparison with other dialects:

English	Mandarin	Zhangzhou	Sanxiang	Catonese
Are you going or not?	你去还是不去呀？	汝去抑是毋去？	汝去抑是唔去？	你去定係唔去？
He didn't hear clearly and started talking nonsense.	他没听清楚就乱说	伊无听清楚着乌白讲	伊无听清楚就乱讲	佢冇听清楚就乱讲
Take it, don't put it down	拿着，别放下来	提咧，莫下落来	挈紧，唔好安落来	𫽋紧，唔好放低嚟
He has never eaten lychee	他没吃过荔枝	伊未食过荔枝	伊未食过荔枝	佢未食过荔枝

=== Syntax ===
Sanxiang, like other Zhongshan Min, has the multifunctional word 放 which functions similarly to Hokkien 予.

Function	English	Mandarin	Zhangzhou	Sanxiang	Cantonese
Verb	To let	让	予 hɔ²²	放 paŋ²¹³	等 tɐŋ³⁵
Verb	To give	给	予 hɔ²²	放 paŋ²¹³	畀 pei̯³⁵
Particle	Passive voice	被/叫/给	予 hɔ²²	放 paŋ²¹³	畀 pei̯³⁵
Particle	Dative marker	给	予 hɔ²²	放 paŋ²¹³	畀 pei̯³⁵

Example sentences:

English	Mandarin	Zhangzhou	Sanxiang	Catonese
Let her watch Cantonese opera	让她看粤剧	予伊看粤剧	放伊睇大戏	等佢睇大戏
Give them some money	给他们一些钱	予伊人一寡钱	放伊侬囝钱	畀佢哋啲钱
The fish was eaten by a cat	鱼被猫吃了	鱼予猫食矣	条鱼放猫儿食噤	条鱼畀猫食咗
I buy bitter melon for you	我给你买苦瓜	我买苦瓜予汝	我买菩督放汝	我买苦瓜畀你

==== Passive construction ====
The passive voice structure in Zhongshan Min dialect is the same as in Mandarin and Hokkien. It is introduced by the preposition "放".

㾪 肴 放 我 食 澈。
san¹³⁻¹¹ gɐu⁵⁵ paŋ²¹³⁻³³ ua¹³ t͡siaʔ⁵³⁻² tʰɐi²¹³.
thin meat PASS 1SG eat completely
'The lean meat was completely eaten by me.'

(cf. Mandarin Chinese: 瘦肉叫我吃光了)

The agent must appear and cannot be omitted, similar to Hokkien and Teochew.

伊 细佬 放 伊侬 呃 噤。
i³³ {sɐi²¹³⁻³³ lau¹³} paŋ²¹³⁻³³ {i³³ naŋ⁵⁵} ŋak²¹⁻³³ kɐm²¹³.
3SG {younger brother} PASS 3PL deceive PFV
'His younger brother was tricked (by someone).'

(cf. Mandarin Chinese: 他弟弟让人给骗了)

==== Disposal construction ====
Disposal construction (处置式) or more commonly known as bǎ construction allows a normally SVO sentence in a Sinitic language to form an SOV structure. In Zhongshan Min, including Sanxiang, this construction is introduced by the word 将 /t͡siɔŋ³³/ similar to Cantonese and Hakka. While this word exists in Mandarin and Hokkien, the more commonly used and default counterpart would be 把 in Mandarin and 共 /ka²²/ in Hokkien.

汝 将 伊 请 来。
li¹³ t͡siɔŋ³³ i³³ t͡sʰia¹³⁻¹¹ lai⁵⁵.
2SG PREP 3SG invite AND
'You invite him here.'

(cf. Mandarin Chinese: 你把他请来)

将 个 石头牯 擗 落 水 兮。
t͡siɔŋ³³ kɐi⁵⁵⁻²¹ {t͡siuʔ⁵³⁻² tʰau⁵⁵⁻²¹ kɔ¹³} pʰiek⁵³⁻² lɔk⁵³⁻² t͡sui¹³⁻¹¹ ai⁵⁵.
PREP CL stone throw ILL water inside
'Throw the stone into the water.'

(cf. Mandarin Chinese: 把石头扔进水里)

The word 将 can be omitted. However, the word referring to the object of disposal is placed after the verb, followed by 伊 to reiterate the object of disposal, the syntax is as follows: Verb + Object + 伊

食 澈 兮 配 伊 啦！
t͡siaʔ⁵³⁻² tʰɐi²¹³⁻³³ ai⁵⁵⁻²¹ pʰui³³ i³³ la³³!
eat completely CL dish 3SG IMP
'Eat all the dishes!'

(cf. Mandarin Chinese: 把这些菜吃光吧！)

抹 虔诚 张 床 伊 啦！
muaʔ⁵³⁻² {kʰin¹¹⁻³³ seŋ¹¹⁻³³} tiu³³ t͡sʰau⁵⁵ i³³ la³³!
wipe clean CL table 3SG IMP
'Wipe the table clean!'

(cf. Mandarin Chinese: 把桌子抹干净吧！)

Alternatively, the object (the recipient of the action) can be placed at the beginning of the sentence, followed by the verb and then a singular (third-person) pronoun "伊" to reiterate the object: Object + Verb + 伊

事干 做 澈 伊 啦！
{si³³ kɔn²¹³⁻³³} t͡sɐu²¹³⁻³³ tʰɐi²¹³⁻³³ i³³ la³³!
matter do completely 3SG IMP
'Finish the work!'

(cf. Mandarin Chinese: 把事儿干完吧！)

间 厝 扫 虔诚 伊 啦！
kan³³ t͡sʰu²¹³ sau²¹³⁻³³ {kʰin¹¹⁻³³ seŋ¹¹⁻³³} i³³ la³³!
CL house sweep clean 3SG IMP
'Sweep the house clean!'

(cf. Mandarin Chinese: 把屋子扫干净吧！)

Disposal construction comparison with other dialects:

English	Mandarin	Zhangzhou	Sanxiang	Catonese
You invite him here	你把他请来	汝共伊请来	汝将伊请来	你将佢请来
Drink up the soup!	把汤喝完吧	汤啉予伊澈澈	汤饮澈伊啦	汤饮晒佢啦

The structure of Fujian Min dialect is slightly different. "予伊" means "to give it", which is different from Zhongshan Min dialect and Guangzhou dialect.

==== Double object construction ====
The most common format for double-object sentences in Zhongshan Min is that the inanimate (direct) object comes first, followed by the person (indirect) object, which is the opposite of the Mandarin usage.

放 一 个 银钱 伊！
paŋ²¹³⁻³³ tit̚²¹⁻³³ kɐi⁵⁵⁻²¹ {ŋin⁵⁵⁻²¹ t͡sʰi⁵⁵} i³³!
give one CL money 3SG
'Give him a yuan!'

(cf. Mandarin Chinese: 给他一块钱！)

借 管 书 我！
t͡siuʔ²¹⁻³³ kua¹³⁻¹¹ t͡su³³ ua¹³!
lend CL book 1SG
'Lend me a book!'

(cf. Mandarin Chinese: 借我一本书吧！)

Additionally, the prepositions 去 can be added between the inanimate and person objects.

放 个 银钱 去 伊！
paŋ²¹³⁻³³ kɐi⁵⁵⁻²¹ {ŋin⁵⁵⁻²¹ t͡sʰi⁵⁵} hi²¹³⁻³³ i³³!
give CL money to 3SG
'Give him a yuan!'

借 管 书 去 我！
t͡siuʔ²¹⁻³³ kua¹³⁻¹¹ t͡su³³ hi²¹³⁻³³ ua¹³!
lend CL book to 1SG
'Lend me a book!'

This syntax where object referring to a person is placed after the object referring to a thing is a typical sentence pattern in Yue and Hakka. It is not seen in Mandarin or Hokkien.

English	Mandarin	Zhangzhou	Sanxiang	Cantonese	Meixian
Give me a hoe	给我一把锄头	予我一支锄头	放(一)把锄头我	畀(一)把锄头我	分(一)把锄头𠊎
Lend him a book	借他一本书	借伊一本册	借(一)本书伊	借(一)本书佢	借(一)本书佢

==== Yes–no questions ====
Yes–no questions in Sanxiang dialect can be formed in two ways. The first is by using the A-not-A construction:

汝 有 无 行 遘到 车站？
li¹³ u¹¹⁻³³ mɐu⁵⁵⁻²¹ kia⁵⁵⁻²¹ {kau²¹³⁻³³ tau²¹³⁻³³} {t͡sʰia³³ t͡sam¹¹}?
2SG GNO NEG go arrive station
'Have you arrived at the station?'

(cf. Mandarin Chinese: 你走到车站了吗？)

Similar to other Sinitic languages, Sanxiang lack a direct way of saying "yes" or "no". Instead, the question above must be answered by saying either "有" (yes) or "无" (no) in accordance to the main verb and negation used.

In addition, the conjunction 抑(是) /a³³ si¹¹/ "or" can be inserted between the two options:

你 得 来 抑(是) 唔 得？
li¹³ tit²¹ lai⁵⁵⁻²¹ {a³³ (si¹¹⁻³³)} m¹¹ tit²¹?
2SG can come or NEG can
'Are you able to come or not?'

(cf. Mandarin Chinese: 你来得了来不了？)

Another way is by putting the negation at the end of a sentence, similar to Hokkien:

汝 去 过 北京 未？
li¹³ hi²¹³⁻³³ kuoi²¹³⁻³³ {pak²¹⁻³³ kieŋ³³} boi¹¹?
2SG go EXP Beijing NEG-SEM
'Have you been to Beijing?'

(cf. Mandarin Chinese: 你去过北京吗？)

==== Comparison ====
===== Equal Construction =====
Equal construction in Zhongshan Min follows the syntax: A + preposition "with" + B + 一样 + adjective. There are three prepositions that can be used, namely: 伨 /tʰin³³/, 同 /taŋ⁵⁵/, 跟 /kin³³/.

细佬 跟 大佬 一样 悬。
{sɐi²¹³⁻³³ lau¹³} kin³³ {tua²¹³⁻³³ lau¹³} {tit̚²¹⁻³³ iu¹¹⁻³³} kui⁵⁵.
{younger brother} with {older brother} same tall
'Younger brother is as tall as older brother.'

(cf. Mandarin Chinese: 弟弟与哥哥一样高。)

Comparisons can be done even with the lack of a second noun.

伊两侬 一样 肥。
{i³³ nɐu³³ naŋ⁵⁵} {tit̚²¹⁻³³ iu¹¹⁻³³} pui⁵⁵.
3DU same fat
'They both are as fat as each other.'

(cf. Mandarin Chinese: 他俩一样胖。)

===== Comparative Construction =====
There are two ways to achieve comparative construction. The more commonly used syntax, similar to Cantonese and Teochew, is: A + adjective + 过 /kuoi²¹³/ + B.

广州 热 过 北京。
{kɔŋ¹³⁻¹¹ t͡siu¹³} zuaʔ⁵³⁻² kuoi²¹³⁻³³ {pak²¹⁻³³ kieŋ³³}.
Guangzhou hot than Beijing
'Guangzhou is hotter than Beijing.'

(cf. Mandarin Chinese: 广州比北京热。)

Another syntax, similar to Mandarin, is: A + 比 /pi¹³/ + B + adjective.

细佬 比 大佬 悬。
{sɐi²¹³⁻³³ lau¹³} pi¹³⁻¹¹ {tua²¹³⁻³³ lau¹³} kui⁵⁵.
{younger brother} {compared to} {older brother} tall
'Younger brother is taller than older brother.'

(cf. Mandarin Chinese: 弟弟比哥哥高。)

The above syntax can be intensified with another adjective, such as 也 /ia¹¹/.

明光 比 今旦 也 好。
{meŋ⁵⁵⁻²¹ kui³³} pi¹³⁻¹¹ {kin³³ nua¹¹} ia¹¹⁻³³ hɐu¹³.
tomorrow compare today {even more} good
'Tomorrow will be better than today.'

(cf. Mandarin Chinese: 明天比今天更好。)

Comparisons compared with other dialects:

English	Mandarin	Zhangzhou	Sanxiang	Catonese	Meixian
He is as tall as me	他跟我一样儿高	伊佮我平(平)悬	伊同我一样悬	佢同我一样(咁)高	佢同𠊎平平高
He is taller than me	他比我高	伊比我较悬	伊悬过我	佢高过我	佢比𠊎过高/佢高过𠊎

== Vocabulary ==
Some words are similar to other Min languages.

English	Cantonese	Sanxiang	Xiamen	Fuzhou	Mandarin
Person	人	侬	侬	侬	人
Person	jɐn²¹	naŋ⁵⁵	laŋ²⁴	nˡøyŋ⁵³	rén
Tall	高	悬	悬	悬	高
Tall	kou̯⁵⁵	kui⁵⁵	kuãi²⁴	kɛiŋ⁵³	gāo
Hard	硬	橂	橂	橂	硬
Hard	ŋaːŋ²²	tɐi¹¹	tiɪŋ²²	taiŋ²⁴²	yìng
To Eat	食	食	食	食	吃
To Eat	sɪk̚²	t͡siaʔ⁵³	t͡siaʔ⁴	sieʔ⁵	chī
Wok	镬	鼎	鼎	鼎	锅
Wok	wɔːk̚²	tia¹³	tiã⁵³	tiaŋ³³	guō
House	屋	厝	厝	厝	房子
House	ʊk̚⁵	t͡sʰu²¹³	t͡sʰu²¹	t͡sʰuɔ²¹³	fángzi
Sun	热头	日头	日头	日头	太阳
Sun	jiːt̚² tʰɐu̯²¹⁻³⁵	zit̚⁵³⁻² tʰɐu⁵⁵	lit̚⁴⁻³² tʰau²⁴	nˡiʔ⁵⁻³³ tʰau⁵³	tàiyáng
Star	星	天星	星	天星	星星
Star	sɪŋ⁵⁵	tʰi³³ sɐi³³	t͡sʰĩ⁴⁴	tʰieŋ⁵⁵ (s-)niŋ⁵⁵	xīngxīng
Eye	眼	目珠	目珠	目珠	眼睛
Eye	ŋaːn¹³	mak̚⁵³⁻² t͡siu³³	bak̚⁴⁻³² t͡siu⁴⁴	mɛiʔ⁵⁻⁵⁵ t͡sieu⁵⁵	yǎnjing
Mouth	嘴	喙	喙	喙	嘴
Mouth	t͡sɵy̯³⁵	t͡sʰui²¹³	t͡sʰui²¹	t͡sʰui²¹³	zuǐ
Foot	脚	骹	骹	骹	脚
Foot	kœːk̚³	kʰa³³	kʰa⁴⁴	kʰa⁵⁵	jiǎo
Leaf	叶	箬	箬	箬	叶子
Leaf	jiːp̚²	hioʔ⁵³	hioʔ⁴	nˡuoʔ⁵	yèzi
Rice plant	禾	粙	粙仔	粙	稻子
Rice plant	wɔː²¹	tiu³³	tiu²²⁻²¹ a⁵³	tiɛu²⁴²	dàozi
Soil	泥	涂	涂	涂	土
Soil	nɐi̯²¹	tʰu⁵⁵	tʰɔ²⁴	tʰu⁵³	tú

Like other Southern Min languages, some bisyllabic compounds are inverted in comparison to Mandarin and Cantonese.

English	Cantonese	Sanxiang	Xiamen	Fuzhou	Mandarin
Throat	喉咙	咙喉	咙喉	喉咙	喉咙
Throat	hɐu̯²¹ lʊŋ²¹	laŋ⁵⁵⁻²¹ ɐu⁵⁵	nã²⁴⁻²² au²⁴	ho⁵³⁻³³ l̃øyŋ⁵³	hóulóng
Typhoon	台风	风台	风台	风台	台风
Typhoon	tʰɔːi̯²¹ fʊŋ⁵⁵	hoŋ³³ tʰai³³	hɔŋ⁴⁴⁻²² tʰai⁴⁴	huŋ⁵⁵ (tʰ-)nai⁵⁵	táifēng

Some words came from Cantonese influence.

English	Cantonese	Sanxiang	Xiamen	Fuzhou	Mandarin
Nose	鼻哥	鼻哥	鼻	鼻	鼻子
Nose	pei̯²² kɔː⁵⁵	pi¹¹⁻³³ kau³³	pʰĩ²²	pʰɛi²¹³	bízi
To Look	睇	睇	看	看	看
To Look	tʰɐi̯³⁵	tʰɐi¹³	kʰuã²¹	kʰɑŋ²¹³	kàn
Bottle	樽	樽	矸仔	瓶瓶	瓶子
Bottle	t͡sɵn⁵⁵	tsɐn³³	kan⁴⁴⁻²² a⁵³	piŋ⁵³⁻³³ piŋ⁵³	píngzi
Child	细佬哥	细佬哥	囡仔	儿囝	小孩
Child	sɐi̯³³ lou̯³⁵ kɔː⁵⁵	sɐi²¹³⁻³³ lau¹³⁻¹¹ ko³³	ɡin⁵³⁻⁴⁴ a⁵³	nˡie²⁴²⁻⁵³ (k-)iaŋ³³	xiǎohái
Kitchen	厨房	厨房	灶骹	灶前	厨房
Kitchen	t͡sʰyː²¹ fɔːŋ²¹⁻³⁵	tu⁵⁵⁻²¹ paŋ³³	t͡sau²¹⁻⁵³ kʰa⁴⁴	t͡sau²¹³⁻⁵⁵ (s-)lɛiŋ⁵³	chúfáng
Kerosene	火水	火水	涂油	洋油	煤油
Kerosene	fɔː³⁵ sɵy̯³⁵	hoi¹³⁻¹¹ tsui¹³	tʰɔ²⁴⁻²² iu²⁴	yoŋ⁵³⁻³³ (Ø-)ŋieu⁵³	méiyóu
Bicycle	单车	单车	跤踏车	跤踏车	自行车
Bicycle	taːn⁵⁵ t͡sʰɛː⁵⁵	tan³³ t͡sʰia³³	kʰa⁴⁴⁻²² ta(ʔ)⁴⁻²¹ t͡sʰia⁴⁴	kʰa⁵⁵ (t-)laʔ⁵⁻⁵⁵ t͡sʰia⁵⁵	zìxíngchē
Monkey	马骝	马骝	猴	猴	猴子
Monkey	maː¹³ lɐu̯²¹⁻⁵⁵	mɐi¹³⁻¹¹ lau⁵⁵	hɔ²⁴	kau⁵³	hóuzi
Glutinous Rice	糯米	糯米	秫米	秫米	糯米
Glutinous Rice	nɔː²² mɐi̯¹³	nɐu¹¹⁻³³ mi¹³	t͡sut̚⁴⁻³² bi⁵³	suʔ⁵⁻³³ mi³³	nuòmǐ

Some words are made by combining Cantonese and Southern Min words.

English	Cantonese	Sanxiang	Xiamen	Fuzhou	Mandarin
Sleeve	(衫)袖	衫䘼	手(䘼)	手䘼	袖子
Sleeve	saːm⁵⁵ t͡sɐu̯²	sa³³ hui¹³	t͡sʰiu⁵³⁻⁴⁴ ŋ̍⁵³	t͡sʰieu³³⁻³⁵ uoŋ³³	xiùzi
To bathe	沖(涼)	洗涼	(洗)身躯	洗汤	洗澡
To bathe	t͡sʰʊŋ⁵⁵ lœːŋ²¹	se¹³⁻¹¹ liu⁵⁵	sue⁵³⁻⁴⁴ sin⁴⁴⁻²² kʰu⁴⁴	sɛ³³⁻²¹ (tʰ-)louŋ⁵⁵	xǐzǎo

Some words are uniquely Sanxiang.

English	Cantonese	Sanxiang	Xiamen	Fuzhou	Mandarin
Banana	香蕉	蕉只	弓蕉	芭蕉	香蕉
Banana	hœːŋ⁵⁵ t͡siːu̯⁵⁵	t͡siu³³ t͡si¹³	kiɪŋ⁴⁴⁻²² t͡sio⁴⁴	pa⁵⁵ (t͡s-)ʒieu⁵⁵	xiāngjiāo
Ear	耳仔	耳朶	耳仔	耳囝	耳朵
Ear	jiː¹³ t͡sɐi̯³⁵	hi¹¹⁻³³ ŋu⁵⁵	hi²²⁻²¹ a⁵³	ŋi²⁴²⁻⁵³ (k-)iaŋ³³	ěrduo
Neck	颈	当颈	颔颈	脰骨	脖子
Neck	kɛːŋ³⁵	taŋ³³ kin³³	am²²⁻²¹ kun⁵³	tau²⁴²⁻⁵³ (k-)ɑuʔ²⁴	bózi
Toilet	厕所	糞厝	屎礐	粪坑厝	厕所
Toilet	t͡sʰiː³³ sɔː³⁵	pun²¹³⁻³³ t͡sʰu²¹³	sai⁵³⁻⁴⁴ hak̚⁴	puŋ²¹³⁻²¹ (kʰ-)ŋaŋ⁵⁵⁻⁵³ (t͡sʰ-)ʒuɔ²¹³	cèsuǒ
Firefly	萤火虫	火蝇火	火金蛄	蓝尾星	萤火虫
Firefly	jɪŋ²¹ fɔː³⁵ t͡sʰʊŋ²¹	hoi¹³⁻¹¹ sin⁵⁵⁻²¹ hoi¹³	he⁵³⁻⁴⁴ kim⁴⁴⁻²² kɔ⁴⁴	l̃aŋ⁵³⁻²¹ mui³³⁻²¹ (s-)liŋ⁵⁵	yínghuǒchóng

=== Literary and colloquial readings ===
Like in other Min languages, Sanxiang words can have a literary (文读) and colloquial reading (白读). Generally, the colloquial reading of a rime is closer to Hokkien whereas the literary reading of rimes is closer to Cantonese. As an example 笔 has the colloquial reading of /pit̚²¹/ whereas the literary reading would be /pɐt̚⁵³/.

English	Cantonese	Sanxiang	Xiamen	Fuzhou	Hanzi
Pencil	jyːn²¹ pɐt̚⁵	in³³ pit̚²¹	iɛn²⁴⁻²² pit̚³²	yoŋ⁵³⁻²¹ (p-)mɛiʔ²⁴	铅笔
Chalk	fɐn³⁵ pɐt̚⁵	fɐn¹³⁻¹¹ pɐt̚⁵³	hun⁵³⁻⁴⁴ pit̚³²		粉笔

=== Time Phrases ===
English	Cantonese	Sanxiang	Xiamen	Fuzhou	Mandarin
Morning	上昼	上旰	早起	上昼	上午
Morning	sœːŋ²² t͡sɐu̯³³	tsiu¹¹⁻³³ kua²¹³	t͡sa⁵³⁻⁴⁴ kʰi⁵³	suoŋ²⁴²⁻⁵³ (t-)nɑu²¹³	shàngwǔ
Noon	晏昼	日昼	日昼	中昼	中午
Noon	aːn³³ t͡sɐu̯³³	zit̚⁵³⁻² tɐu²¹³	lit̚⁴⁻³² tau²¹	touŋ⁵⁵⁻⁵³ (t-)nɑu²¹³	zhōngwǔ
Afternoon	下昼	下旰	下晡	下昼	下午
Afternoon	haː²² t͡sɐu̯³³	e¹¹⁻³³ kua²¹³	e²²⁻²¹ pɔ⁴⁴	a²⁴²⁻⁵³ (t-)lɑu²¹³	xiàwǔ
Night	夜晚黑	暝昏	暝昏	暝晡	晚上
Night	jɛː²² maːn¹³ haːk̚⁵	mɐi⁵⁵⁻²¹ hui³³	mĩ²⁴⁻²² hŋ̍⁴⁴	maŋ⁵³⁻⁵⁵ (p-)muo⁵⁵	wǎnshang

=== Family Terms ===
English	Cantonese	Sanxiang	Xiamen	Fuzhou	Mandarin
Son	仔	??囝	囝	囝	儿子
Son	t͡sɐi̯³⁵	sem³³ me⁵⁵⁻²¹ kia¹³	kiã⁵³	kiaŋ³³	érzi
Daughter	女	查某囝	查某囝	诸娘囝	女儿
Daughter	nɵy̯¹³	t͡sam³³ mou¹³⁻¹¹ kia¹³	t͡sa⁴⁴⁻²² bɔ⁵³⁻⁴⁴ kiã⁵³	t͡sy⁵⁵⁻⁵³ nˡøyŋ⁵³⁻³³ (k-)ŋiaŋ³³	nǚ'ér
Husband	老公	老翁	翁	老公	丈夫
Husband	lou̯¹³ kʊŋ⁵⁵	lau¹¹⁻³³ aŋ³³	aŋ⁴⁴	l̃a²⁴²⁻⁵⁵ (k-)uŋ⁵⁵	zhàngfu
Wife	老婆	老婆	某	老妈	妻子
Wife	lou̯¹³ pʰɔː²¹	lau¹¹⁻³³ pau⁵⁵	bɔ⁵³	l̃au²⁴²⁻⁵³ ma³³	qīzi

== Sources ==
- 张, 振兴 (1987). "广东省中山市三乡闽语" (PDF). 《语言文字论集》 (1): 35–43.
- 陳, 小楓 (1996). "中山間語語音概說" (PDF). 中山大学学报: 社会科学版 (1): 235–249.
- Bodman, Nicholas C. (1988). "Two Divergent Southern Min Dialects of the Sanxiang District, Zhongshan, Guangdong" (PDF). 《中央研究院歷史語言研究所集刊》. 59 (2): 401–423.
- 高, 然 (1999). "中山三乡闽语词汇特征". 语言与方言论稿: 226–242.
- 陈, 小枫 (1990). "中山闽方言探源". In 李, 新魁; 傅, 雨贤 (eds.). 语言文字论集. 语言文字论集 中山大学中文系本书编委会. 广东人民出版社. pp. 180–202. ISBN 7-218-00207-2.
- 陈, 小枫; 陈, 淑环 (2003). "粤方言对中山闽语语法系统的影响概述". In 詹, 伯慧 (ed.). 第八届国际粤方言研讨会论文集. 国际粤方言研讨会论文集. 中国社会科学出版社. pp. 593–608. ISBN 7-5004-4202-5.
- 高, 然 (2017). "中山闽语语法概述". In 高, 然 (ed.). 语言与方言论稿. 语言与方言论稿 第二辑. 北京/西安:世界图书出版公司. pp. 221–241. ISBN 978-7-5192-3293-1.
