= Min Chinese =

Primary branch of Sinitic spoken in southern China and Taiwan

Min
- 閩 / 闽
- Geographic distribution: China, Taiwan, and Southeast Asia
- Ethnicity: Min
- Native speakers: 75 million (2012)
- Linguistic classification: Sino-Tibetan: Sinitic; Chinese (Note: Min is believed to have split from Old Chinese, rather than Middle Chinese like other varieties of Chinese.); Min
- Proto-language: Proto-Min
- Subdivisions: Coastal Min: Eastern Min, Hainanese, Leizhou Min, Pu-Xian Min, Southern Min; Inland Min: Central Min, Northern Min, Shao-Jiang Min

Language codes
- ISO 639-6: mclr
- Glottolog: minn1248
- Linguasphere: 79-AAA-h
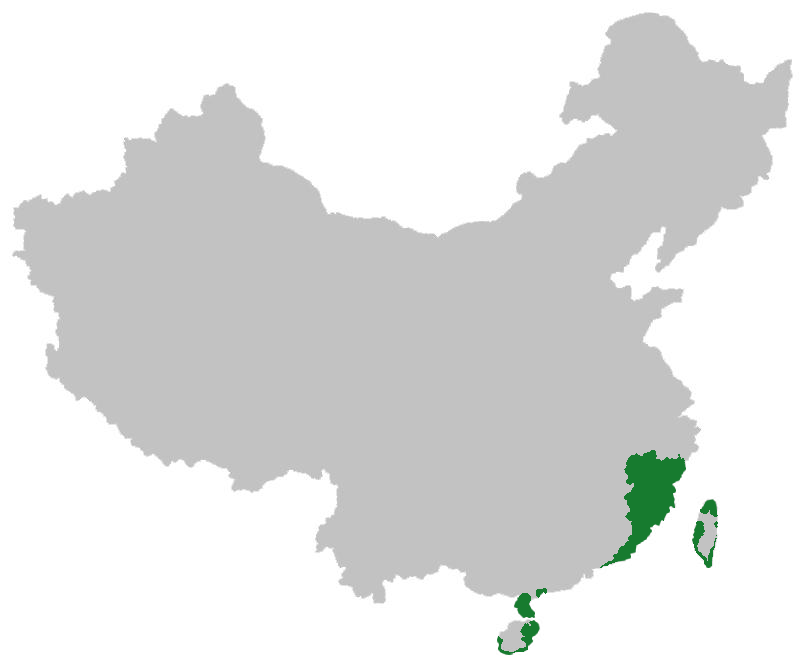
- Distribution of Min languages in China and Taiwan

Min Chinese
- Traditional Chinese: 閩語
- Simplified Chinese: 闽语
Transcriptions
Standard Mandarin
- Hanyu Pinyin: Mǐn Yǔ
- Wade–Giles: Min^{3} Yü^{3}
Yue: Cantonese
- Yale Romanization: Máhnyúh
Southern Min
- Hokkien POJ: Bân-gú / Bân-gír / Bân-gí
- Teochew Peng'im: Mang7 ghe2
Eastern Min
- Fuzhou BUC: Mìng ngṳ̄
Pu-Xian Min
- Hinghwa BUC: Máng-gṳ̂
Northern Min
- Jian'ou Romanized: Mâing-ngṳ̌

Min (Note: simplified Chinese: 闽语; traditional Chinese: 閩語; pinyin: Mǐnyǔ; Pe̍h-ōe-jī: Bân-gú / Bân-gír / Bân-gí; BUC: Mìng-ngṳ̄) is a diverse group of Sinitic languages with about 75 million native speakers. These languages are spoken in China in a region centered on modern Fujian Province, stretching from Southern Zhejiang to Eastern Guangdong, as well as on Hainan Island and the neighbouring Leizhou Peninsula. Min varieties are also spoken in Taiwan, and by a large international diaspora, particularly in Southeast Asia. The name Min is shared with the Min River in Fujian, and is also the abbreviated name of Fujian Province. The Min languages are not mutually intelligible with one another or with other varieties of Chinese.

The most widely spoken variety of Min outside of China is Hokkien, a variety of Southern Min that has its origin in Southern Fujian. Amoy Hokkien is the prestige dialect of Hokkien in Fujian, while a majority of Taiwanese people speak a dialect called Taiwanese Hokkien or simply Taiwanese. The majority of Chinese Singaporeans, Chinese Malaysians, Chinese Filipinos, Chinese Indonesians, Chinese Thais, and Chinese Cambodians are of Southern Min-speaking background (particularly Hokkien and Teochew), although some of these communities are shifting to national or regional languages. Communities speaking Eastern Min, Pu-Xian Min, Haklau Min, Leizhou Min, and Hainanese can also be found in parts of the Chinese diaspora, such as in Malaysia, Singapore, and Indonesia.

While other branches of Chinese descend from Middle Chinese of the Sui and Tang dynasties, the Min languages have retained some features of Old Chinese lost in other branches. The Min languages are also believed to have a linguistic substrate from the languages of the inhabitants of the region before its sinicization.

== History ==
The Min homeland of Fujian was opened to Han Chinese settlement by the defeat of the Minyue state by the armies of Emperor Wu of Han in 110 BC. The area features rugged mountainous terrain, with short rivers that flow into the South China Sea. Most subsequent migration from north to south China passed through the valleys of the Xiang and Gan rivers to the west, so that Min varieties have experienced less northern influence than other southern groups. As a result, whereas most varieties of Chinese can be treated as derived from Middle Chinese, the language that is described by rhyme dictionaries such as the Qieyun (601 AD), Min varieties contain traces of older distinctions. Linguists estimate that the oldest layers of the Min dialects diverged from the rest of Chinese around the time of the Han dynasty. However, significant waves of migration from the North China Plain occurred:

- The Upheaval of the Five Barbarians during the Jin dynasty, particularly the Disaster of Yongjia in 311 AD, caused a tide of immigration to the south.
- In 669, Chen Zheng and his son Chen Yuanguang from Gushi County in Henan set up a regional administration in Fujian to suppress an insurrection by the She people.
- Wang Chao was appointed governor of Fujian in 893, near the end of the Tang dynasty, and brought tens of thousands of troops from Henan. In 909, following the fall of the Tang dynasty, his son Wang Shenzhi founded the Min Kingdom, one of the Ten Kingdoms in the Five Dynasties and Ten Kingdoms period.

Jerry Norman identifies four main layers in the vocabulary of modern Min varieties:

1. A non-Chinese substratum from the original languages of Minyue, which Norman and Mei Tsu-lin hypothesize were Austroasiatic.
2. The earliest Chinese layer, brought to Fujian by settlers from Zhejiang to the north during the Han dynasty (compare Eastern Han Chinese).
3. A layer from the Northern and Southern dynasties period, which is largely consistent with the phonology of the Qieyun dictionary (Early Middle Chinese).
4. A literary layer based on the koiné of Chang'an, the capital of the Tang dynasty (Late Middle Chinese).

Laurent Sagart (2008) disagrees with Norman and Mei Tsu-lin's analysis of an Austroasiatic substratum in Min. The hypothesis proposed by Jerry Norman and Mei Tsu-lin arguing for an Austroasiatic homeland along the middle Yangtze has been largely abandoned in most circles and left unsupported by the majority of Austroasiatic specialists. Rather, recent movements of analyzing archeological evidence, posit an Austronesian layer, rather than an Austroasiatic one.

== Geographic location and subgrouping ==
Min dialect groups according to the Language Atlas of China: Shao-Jiang Northern Central / Eastern Pu-Xian Southern / Leizhou Hainan

Min languages by number of native speakers (as of 2004)
1. Hokkien (41.6%)
2. Teochew (incl. Haklau) (19.5%)
3. Eastern Min (13.9%)
4. Hainanese (9.40%)
5. Leizhou Min (6.20%)
6. Pu-Xian Min (3.50%)
7. Northern Min (3.50%)
8. Shao-Jiang Min (1.20%)
9. Central Min (0.90%)
10. Datian Min (0.30%)

Min is usually described as one of seven or ten groups of varieties of Chinese but has greater dialectal diversity than any of the other groups. The varieties used in neighbouring counties, and in the mountains of western Fujian even in adjacent villages, are often mutually unintelligible.

Early classifications, such as those of Li Fang-Kuei in 1937 and Yuan Jiahua in 1960, divided Min into Northern and Southern subgroups. However, in a 1963 report on a survey of Fujian, Pan Maoding and colleagues argued that the primary split was between inland and coastal groups. A key discriminator between the two groups is a group of words that have a lateral initial /l/ in coastal varieties, and a voiceless fricative /s/ or /ʃ/ in inland varieties, contrasting with another group having /l/ in both areas. Norman reconstructs these initials in Proto-Min as voiceless and voiced laterals that merged in coastal varieties.

=== Coastal Min ===
The coastal varieties have the vast majority of speakers, and have spread from their homeland in Fujian and eastern Guangdong to the islands of Taiwan and Hainan, to other coastal areas of southern China, and to Southeast Asia. Pan and colleagues divided them into three groups:

- Eastern Min (Min Dong), centered around the city of Fuzhou, the capital of Fujian province, with Fuzhou dialect as the prestige form, also including the Fuqing dialect, etc.
  - The Longdu and Nanlang dialect of Zhongshan Min in Guangdong province
- Pu-Xian Min is spoken in the city of Putian and the county of Xianyou County. Li Rulong and Chen Zhangtai examined 214 words, finding 62% shared with Quanzhou dialect (Southern Min) and 39% shared with Fuzhou dialect (Eastern Min), and concluded that Pu-Xian was more closely related to Southern Min.
- Southern Min (Min Nan) originates from the south of Fujian and the eastern corner of Guangdong.
  - In popular usage, Southern Min usually refers to dialects of the Quanzhang type, which originated in southern Fujian (around Quanzhou, Zhangzhou and Xiamen) and spread to Southeast Asia, particularly Singapore, Malaysia, the Philippines, Indonesia, Brunei, Myanmar, Cambodia, Thailand, and Southern Vietnam, where they are known as Hokkien, and Taiwan, where they are known as Taiwanese.
  - The dialects of the Teoswa / Chaoshan region of eastern Guangdong, including Teochew and Swatow dialects, have difficult mutual intelligibility with the Amoy dialect of Hokkien. Teochew varieties are the most commonly spoken by Thai Chinese and Chinese Cambodians, and second-most common among Hoa Vietnamese.
  - Zhenan Min of Cangnan County in southern Zhejiang is also of this type.
  - Haklau Min (Hai Lok Hong / Hailufeng) spoken in eastern Guangdong to the west of Teoswa (Chaoshan Min).
  - Datian Min of Datian County in Sanming, Fujian
  - Potentially, also the Sanxiang dialect of Zhongshan Min in Guangdong province

The Language Atlas of China (1987) distinguished two further groups, which had previously been included in Southern Min:

- Leizhou Min, spoken on the Leizhou Peninsula in southwestern Guangdong.
- Hainanese, spoken on the island of Hainan. These dialects feature drastic changes to initial consonants, including a series of implosive consonants, that have been attributed to contact with the Tai–Kadai languages spoken on the island.

Coastal varieties feature some uniquely Min vocabulary, including pronouns and negatives. All but the Hainan dialects have complex tone sandhi systems.

=== Inland Min ===
Although they have far fewer speakers, the inland varieties show much greater variation than the coastal ones. Pan and colleagues divided the inland varieties into two groups:

- Northern Min (Min Bei) is spoken in Nanping prefecture in Fujian, with Jian'ou dialect taken as typical.
- Central Min (Min Zhong), spoken in Sanming prefecture.

The Language Atlas of China (1987) included a further group:

- Shao-Jiang Min, spoken in the northwestern Fujian counties of Shaowu and Jiangle, were classified as Hakka by Pan and his associates. However, Jerry Norman suggested that they were inland varieties of Min that had been subject to heavy Gan or Hakka influence.

Although coastal varieties can be derived from a proto-language with four series of stops or affricates at each point of articulation (e.g. /t/, /tʰ/, /d/, and /dʱ/), inland varieties contain traces of two further series, which Norman termed "softened stops" due to their reflexes in some varieties. Inland varieties use pronouns and negatives cognate with those in Hakka and Yue. Inland varieties have little or no tone sandhi.

== Vocabulary ==
Most Min vocabulary corresponds directly to cognates in other Chinese varieties, but there are also a significant number of distinctively Min words that may be traced back to proto-Min. In some cases a semantic shift has occurred in Min or the rest of Chinese:

- *tiaŋ^{B} 鼎 "wok". The Min form preserves the original meaning "cooking pot", but in other Chinese varieties this word (MC tengX > dǐng) has become specialized to refer to ancient ceremonial tripods.
- *dzhən^{A} "rice field". In Min, this form has displaced the common Chinese term tián 田. Many scholars identify the Min word with chéng 塍 (MC zying) "raised path between fields", but Norman argues that it is cognate with céng 層 (MC dzong) "additional layer or floor", reflecting the terraced fields commonly found in Fujian.
- *tšhio^{C} 厝 "house". Norman argues that the Min word is cognate with shù 戍 (MC syuH) "to guard".
- *tshyi^{C} 喙 "mouth". In Min this form has displaced the common Chinese term kǒu 口. It is believed to be cognate with huì 喙 (MC xjwojH) "beak, bill, snout; to pant".

Norman and Mei Tsu-lin have suggested an Austroasiatic origin for some Min words:

- *-dəŋ^{A} "shaman" may be compared with Vietnamese đồng (/ɗoŋ^{2}/) "to shamanize, to communicate with spirits" and Mon doŋ "to dance (as if) under demonic possession".
- *kiɑn^{B} 囝 "son" appears to be related to Vietnamese con (/kɔn/) and Mon kon "child".

However, Norman and Mei Tsu-lin's suggestion is rejected by Laurent Sagart (2008), with some linguists arguing that the Austroasiatic predecessor of the modern Vietnamese language originated in the mountainous region in Central Laos and Vietnam, rather than in the region north of the Red River delta.

In other cases, the origin of the Min word is obscure. Such words include:

- *khau^{A} 骹 "foot"
- *-tsiɑm^{B} 䭕 "insipid"
- *dzyŋ^{C} 𧚔 "to wear"

== Writing system ==
When using Chinese characters to write a non-Mandarin form, a common practice is to use characters that correspond etymologically to the words being represented, and for words with no evident etymology, to either invent new characters or borrow characters for their sound or meaning. Written Cantonese has carried this process out to the farthest extent of any non-Mandarin variety, to the extent that pure Cantonese vernacular can be unambiguously written using Chinese characters. Contrary to common assumptions, a vernacular written in this fashion is not generally comprehensible to a Mandarin reader, due to significant differences in grammar and vocabulary and the necessary use of a large number of non-Mandarin characters.

For most Min varieties, a similar process has not taken place. For Hokkien, competing systems exist. Given that Min combines the Chinese of several different periods and contains some non-Chinese substrate vocabulary, an author literate in Mandarin (or even Classical Chinese) may have trouble finding the appropriate Chinese characters for some Min vocabulary. In the case of Taiwanese, there are also indigenous words borrowed from Formosan languages (particularly for place names), as well as a substantial number of loan words from Japanese. The Min (Hokkien, Teochew, Hainanese, Luichow, Hinghwa, Hokchew, Hokchia, Haklau / Hai Lok Hong) spoken in Singapore, Malaysia, and Indonesia has borrowed heavily from Malay (or Indonesian for Indonesia) and, to a lesser extent, from Singaporean or Malaysian English and other languages. Meanwhile, the Hokkien spoken in the Philippines has also borrowed a few terms from Spanish, Tagalog (Filipino), and English over the recent centuries. In Kelantan Peranakan Hokkien, spoken in Kelantan state of Malaysia to Pattani province of Thailand, a mix of Southern Thai and Kelantan Malay is also used with the local Kelantan Hokkien of Peranakans and Chinese Malaysians in Northern Malaya. The result is that adapting Chinese characters to write Min requires a substantial effort to choose characters for a significant portion of the vocabulary.

Other approaches to writing Min rely on romanization or phonetic systems such as Taiwanese Phonetic Symbols or historically during Japanese rule over Taiwan, Taiwanese kana was also used for Taiwanese Hokkien in some Taiwanese-Japanese dictionaries made during that time. Since 1987, Taiwanese Hangul also exists for Taiwanese Hokkien. Some Min speakers use the Church Romanization (simplified Chinese: 教会罗马字; traditional Chinese: 教會羅馬字; pinyin: Jiàohuì Luómǎzì; Pe̍h-ōe-jī: Kàu-hoē Lô-má-jī). For Hokkien the romanization is called Pe̍h-ōe-jī (POJ). For Fuzhounese it is called Foochow Romanized (Bàng-uâ-cê, BUC). For the Putian dialect it is called Hinghwa Romanized (Hing-hua̍ Báⁿ-uā-ci̍). For the Jian'ou dialect it is called Kienning Colloquial Romanized (Gṳ̿ing-nǎing Lô̤-mǎ-cī). For Hainanese it is called Bǽh-oe-tu (BOT). These systems were developed by British, Irish, Danish, and American Protestant Christian missionaries over the course of the 19th century. In 2006, Tâi-lô (Tâi-uân Lô-má-jī Phing-im Hong-àn) which was derived from Pe̍h-ōe-jī (POJ) was officially promoted by Taiwan's Ministry of Education (MOE). Some publications use mixed writing, with mostly Chinese characters but using the Latin alphabet to represent words that cannot easily be represented by Chinese characters. In Taiwan, a mix of Chinese characters and Latin letters written in Pe̍h-ōe-jī (POJ) or Tâi-lô has recently been practiced. In Singapore, Malaysia, the Philippines, and Indonesia, some also occasionally write Hokkien and/or Teochew using Latin letters via ad-hoc means using the writer's knowledge of the local mainstream orthography they grew up being literate in, such as Singaporean or Malaysian English orthography (descended from British English), Malay orthography / Indonesian orthography, Mandarin Pinyin for those in Singapore, Malaysia, and Indonesia, then Philippine English orthography (descended from American English), Filipino orthography, Mandarin Pinyin, and sometimes Spanish orthography (for older writings), for those in the Philippines.

== See also ==
- Chinese in New York City
