= Haklau Min =

Variety of Southern Min

Haklau
- Hai Lok Hong, Hailufeng
- 學佬話／福佬話 Hok-láu-ōe 海陸豐話 Hái-lio̍k-hong-ōe
- Region: Mainly in Shanwei, eastern Guangdong province.
- Native speakers: 2.65 million (2021)
- Language family: Sino-Tibetan: Sinitic; Chinese; Min; Coastal Min; Southern Min; (disputed); Haklau
- Early forms: Proto-Sino-Tibetan: Old Chinese (Note: Min is believed to have split from Old Chinese, rather than Middle Chinese like other varieties of Chinese.); Proto-Min

Language codes
- ISO 639-3: None (mis)
- ISO 639-6: hife
- Glottolog: None
- Linguasphere: 79-AAA-jik (Haifeng); 79-AAA-jij (Lufeng)
- Haklau Min in Shanwei

Haklau Min
- Traditional Chinese: 海陸豐話
- Simplified Chinese: 海陆丰话
Transcriptions
Standard Mandarin
- Hanyu Pinyin: Hǎilùfēng huà
Yue: Cantonese
- Jyutping: hoi^{2} luk^{6} fung^{1} waa^{6}
Southern Min
- Hokkien POJ: Hái-lio̍k-hong-ōa / Hái-lio̍k-hong-ōe
- Teochew Peng'im: hai^{2} lêg^{8} hong^{1} uê^{7}

Alternative Chinese name
- Traditional Chinese: 學佬話／福佬話
- Simplified Chinese: 学佬话／福佬话
Transcriptions
Southern Min
- Hokkien POJ: Ha̍k-láu-ōe
- Teochew Peng'im: hak^{8} lao^{2} uê^{7}

Second alternative Chinese name
- Traditional Chinese: 海豐話
- Simplified Chinese: 海丰话
Transcriptions
Standard Mandarin
- Hanyu Pinyin: Hǎifēng huà
Yue: Cantonese
- Jyutping: hoi^{2} fung^{1} waa^{6}
Southern Min
- Hokkien POJ: Hái-hong-ōe
- Teochew Peng'im: hai^{2} hong^{1} uê^{7}

Haklau, Hai Lok Hong or Hailufeng, is a variety of Southern Min spoken in Shanwei, Guangdong province, China. While it is related to Teochew and Hokkien, its exact classification in relation to them is disputed.

== Etymology ==
The word Haklau (學佬 Ha̍k-láu, also written as 福佬) is the Southern Min pronunciation of Hoklo, originally a Hakka exonym for the Southern Min speakers, including Hoklo and Teochew people. Although originally it was perceived as a derogatory term, the Southern Min speakers in Shanwei self-identify as Haklau and distinguish themselves from Teochew people and Hokkien people. Overseas Hailufeng people still do not like this appellation.

Historically, the region of Hailufeng was not a part of Chaozhou prefecture (潮州府, the region currently known as Teo-Swa or Chaoshan), but was included in the primarily Hakka-speaking Huizhou prefecture (惠州府). Modern Huizhou city (particularly the Huidong County) also has a Haklau-speaking minority.

The word Hai Lok Hong (海陸豐 Hái-lio̍k-hong) is a portmanteau of Hai Hong (海豐, Mandarin Haifeng) and Lok Hong (陸豐, Mandarin Lufeng), where it is mainly spoken. The character 陸 has multiple pronunciations in Southern Min: the reading le̍k is vernacular, it is common in Teochew, but rarely used in Hokkien and Haklau itself; the reading lio̍k (Hokkien, Haklau) or lo̍k (Teochew) is literary and commonly used in Hokkien and Haklau, but not Teochew, yet its Teochew rendering is the source of English Hai Lok Hong.

== Classification ==
The Language Atlas of China classifies Hai Lok Hong as part of Teochew. Other classifications pinpoint the phonological features of Hai Lok Hong that are not found in Teochew, but instead are typical for Chiangchew Hokkien. These features include:

- the final /-i/ in characters like 魚 hî 'fish', 語 gí 'language', and the final /-u/ in 自 chū 'self', 事 sū 'matter', as in Chiangchew Hokkien. Northern Teochew has /-ɯ/ in these words, while Southern Teochew (the Teoyeo dialect) has them with /-u/.
- the final /-uĩ/ in words like 門 mûi 'door; gate', 光 kuiⁿ 'light'. Teochew has them with /-ɯŋ/ or /-uŋ/.
- the finals /-e/ (坐 chě 'to sit', 短 té 'short'), /-eʔ/ (節 cheh 'festival', 截 che̍h 'to cut') and /-ei/ (雞 kei 'chicken', 街 kei 'street'), as in rural southern dialects of Hokkien (such as Zhangpu, Yunxiao, or Chawan), corresponding to Teochew /-o/, /-oiʔ/ and /-oi/. Conservative Northern Hokkien dialects have these words with /-ə/, /-əeʔ/, and /-əe/ respectively.
- the preservation of the codas /-n/ and /-t/ (as in 民 mîn 'people; nation' and 骨 kut 'bone'), which are merged with /-ŋ/ and /-k/ in most dialects of Teochew.

Still, Hai Lok Hong also has features typical for Teochew, but not Hokkien, such as:

- the preservation of 8 tones, pronounced similarly to Northern Teochew. Most dialects of Hokkien only have 7 citation tones.
- the final /-uaŋ/ in 況 khuàng 'situation', 亡 buâng 'to perish', which has merged with /-oŋ/ in Hokkien.
- less extensive denasalization: Hai Lok Hong and Teochew differentiate between 逆 nge̍k 'to go against' and 玉 ge̍k 'jade', or 宜 ngî 'suitable' and 疑 gî 'doubt', while in Hokkien, these pairs are merged (ge̍k and gî respectively).

Lexically, Hai Lok Hong also shares some traits with Teochew: 個 kâi '(possessive particle)', 愛 àiⁿ 'to want', 睇 théi 'to see' — compare Hokkien 兮 --ê, 卜 beh and 看 khòaⁿ.
