= Nanlang dialect =

Eastern Min dialect of Guangdong, China

Nanlang
- 南蓢話
- Namlong
- Native to: China
- Region: Mainly in Nanlang, southern Guangdong province.
- Language family: Sino-Tibetan: Sinitic; Chinese; Min; Coastal Min; Eastern Min; (Zhongshan Min); Nanlang
- Early forms: Proto-Sino-Tibetan: Old Chinese (Note: Min is believed to have split from Old Chinese, rather than Middle Chinese like other varieties of Chinese.); Proto-Min

Language codes
- ISO 639-3: None (mis)
- Glottolog: nanl1234
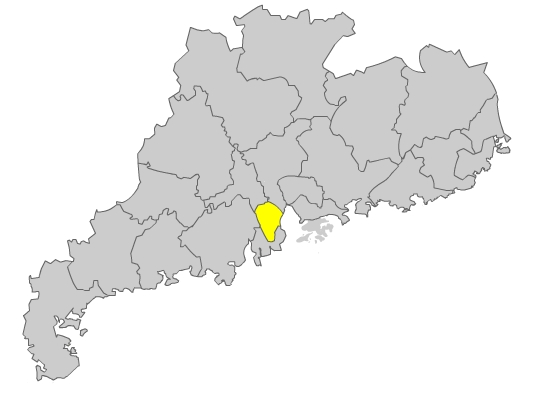
- Nanlang dialect, at the eastern edge of Zhongshan City

The Nanlang dialect is a variant of the Eastern Min Chinese predominantly spoken in Nanlang a town within Zhongshan in the Pearl River Delta of Guangdong, China. Despite its close proximity, Nanlang is not very closely related to the surrounding dialects in the region, which belong to the Yue group. As such, Nanlang forms a "dialect island" of Min speakers. It is one of three enclaves of Min in Zhongshan, the others being Longdu and Sanxiang.
