= Southern Min =

Branch of the Min Chinese languages

- Minnan; 閩南語; 闽南语; Bàn-lâm-gú/Bân-lâm-gí
- Geographic distribution: China, Taiwan, and Southeast Asia
- Ethnicity: Hoklo; Teochew
- Speakers: L1: 34 million (2020–2022); L2: 12 million (2020); Total: 46 million (2020–2022)
- Linguistic classification: Sino-Tibetan: Sinitic; Chinese; Min; Coastal Min; Southern Min
- Early forms: Proto-Sino-Tibetan: Old Chinese (Note: Min is believed to have split from Old Chinese, rather than Middle Chinese like other varieties of Chinese.); Proto-Min
- Subdivisions: Hokkien; Teochew; Zhenan; Datian; Sanxiang; Haklau

Language codes
- ISO 639-3: nan
- Glottolog: minn1241
- Linguasphere: 79-AAA-j
- Southern Min in mainland China and Taiwan

- Subgroups of Southern Min in mainland China and Taiwan

Southern Min
- Traditional Chinese: 閩南語
- Simplified Chinese: 闽南语
- Literal meaning: "Language of Southern Min [Fujian]"
Transcriptions
Standard Mandarin
- Hanyu Pinyin: Mǐnnányǔ
- Wade–Giles: Min^{3}-nan^{2} yü^{3}
- IPA: [mìnnǎn ỳ]
Gan
- Romanization: Mîn-lōm-ngî
Hakka
- Romanization: Mîn-nàm-ngî
Yue: Cantonese
- Yale Romanization: Máhnnàahm yúh
- Jyutping: Man5 naam4 jyu5
Southern Min
- Hokkien POJ: Bân-lâm-gí/Bân-lâm-gú
Eastern Min
- Fuzhou BUC: Mìng-nàng-ngṳ̄
Northern Min
- Jian'ou Romanized: Mâing-nâng-ngṳ̌

Southern Min (simplified Chinese: 闽南语; traditional Chinese: 閩南語; pinyin: Mǐnnányǔ; Pe̍h-ōe-jī: Bân-lâm-gí/gú; lit. 'Southern Min language'), Minnan (Mandarin pronunciation: [mìn.nǎn]) or Banlam (Min Nan Chinese pronunciation: [bàn.lǎm]) is a group of linguistically similar and historically related Chinese languages that form a branch of Min Chinese spoken in Fujian (especially the Minnan region), most of Taiwan (many citizens are descendants of settlers from Fujian), Eastern Guangdong, Hainan, and Southern Zhejiang. Southern Min dialects are also spoken by descendants of emigrants from these areas in diaspora, most notably in Southeast Asia, such as Singapore, Malaysia, the Philippines, Indonesia, Brunei, Southern Thailand, Myanmar, Cambodia, Southern and Central Vietnam, as well as major cities in the United States, including in San Francisco, in Los Angeles and in New York City. Minnan is the most widely-spoken branch of Min, with approximately 34 million native speakers as of 2025.

The most widely spoken Southern Min language is Hokkien, which includes Taiwanese. Other varieties of Southern Min have significant differences from Hokkien, some having limited mutual intelligibility with it, others almost none. Teochew, Longyan, and Zhenan are said to have general mutual intelligibility with Hokkien, sharing similar phonology and vocabulary to a large extent. On the other hand, variants such as Datian, Zhongshan, and Qiong-Lei have historical linguistic roots with Hokkien, but are significantly divergent from it in terms of phonology and vocabulary, and thus have almost no mutual intelligibility with Hokkien. Linguists tend to classify them as separate languages.

== Geographic distribution ==
=== China ===
Southern Min dialects are spoken in southern Fujian, specifically in the cities of Xiamen, Quanzhou, Zhangzhou, and much of Longyan, hence the name. In addition, varieties of Southern Min are spoken in several southeastern counties of Wenzhou in Zhejiang, the Zhoushan archipelago off Ningbo in Zhejiang, the town of Sanxiang at the southern periphery of Zhongshan in Guangdong, parts of Huizhou and Shanwei in Guangdong and in the Chaoshan (Teo-swa) region in Guangdong.

The variant spoken in Leizhou, Guangdong as well as that in Hainan is classified as Hainanese and is not mutually intelligible with mainstream Southern Min or Teochew. Hainanese is classified in some schemes as part of Southern Min and in other schemes as separate; among the latter, Hou combined Hainanese with Leizhou Min in a Qiong–Lei subgroup within Min, distinct from Southern Min. Some have even considered this distinction to be at the same level as the Coastal Min – Inland Min distinction.

Puxian Min was originally based on the Quanzhou dialect, but over time became heavily influenced by Eastern Min, eventually losing intelligibility with Southern Min. It is thus categorised into its own branch alongside Southern Min and Eastern Min.

=== Taiwan ===
The Southern Min dialects spoken in Taiwan, collectively known as Taiwanese, is a first language for most of the Hoklo people, the main ethnic group of Taiwan. The correspondence between language and ethnicity is not absolute, as some Hoklo Taiwanese people have very limited proficiency in Taiwanese while some non-Hoklo Taiwanese people (including Hakkas and Indigenous) speak Taiwanese Southern Min fluently.

=== Southeast Asia ===
There are many Southern Min speakers among overseas Chinese in Southeast Asia. Many ethnic Chinese immigrants to the region were Hoklo from southern Fujian and brought the language to what is now present-day Malaysia and Singapore (formerly British Malaya, the Straits Settlements, and British Borneo), Indonesia (the former Dutch East Indies), the Philippines (former Spanish East Indies and later, US -Philippine Islands), Brunei (former part of British Borneo), Southern Thailand, Myanmar (British Burma), Cambodia (former French Cambodia of French Indochina), Southern Vietnam (former French Cochinchina of French Indochina) and Central Vietnam (former French Annam of French Indochina). In general, Southern Min from southern Fujian is known as Hokkien, Hokkienese, Fukien, or Fookien in Southeast Asia and is mostly mutually intelligible with Hokkien spoken elsewhere. Many Southeast Asian ethnic Chinese also originated in the Chaoshan region of Guangdong and speak Teochew, the variant of Southern Min from that region, particularly Thailand, Cambodia, Southern Vietnam, Malaysia, Singapore, Indonesia, etc.

In the Philippines, Philippine Hokkien is reportedly the native or heritage language of up to 98.7% of the Chinese Filipino community, who refer to it as "Lannang" (Lán-nâng-ōe; lit. 'our people's language').

Southern Min speakers form the majority of Chinese in Singapore, with Hokkien being the largest group and the second largest being Teochew. Despite the similarities, the two groups are rarely viewed together as "Southern Min".

== Classification and varieties ==
There are two or three major divisions of Southern Min, depending on the criteria for Leizhou and Hainanese inclusion:

- Southern Min
  - Hokkien under the Quanzhang division (泉漳片)
  - Teochew, Swatow, Jieyang, Haklau Min under the Chaoshan division (潮汕片)
  - Leizhou and Hainanese dialects under the Qiong-Lei division (瓊雷片).

More recently, Kwok (2018: 157) has proposed an alternative classification, with a divergent Northern branch that includes Quanzhou dialect but not Zhangzhou dialect, as shown below:

- Southern Min
  - Northern
    - Cangnan
    - Quanzhou, Zihu, Lukang
  - Central-Southern
    - Central
      - Zhangzhou
      - Longyan, Datian
    - Southern
      - Guangdong
        - ? Haifeng
        - Jieyang, Chaoyang
      - Hainan
        - Leizhou
        - Haikou

=== Hokkien ===
Hokkien is the most widely spoken form of Southern Min, including Amoy dialect and Taiwanese. Both of these developed as a combination of Quanzhou and Zhangzhou speech. Varieties in South-East Asia include: Singaporean Hokkien, Southern Peninsular Malaysian Hokkien, and Philippine Hokkien (which are closer to Quanzhou Hokkien), and Penang Hokkien and Medan Hokkien (which are closer to Zhangzhou Hokkien).

=== Teochew ===
Teochew is a closely related to Hokkien, with several variants spoken across the Chaoshan region. Some also consider Haklau Min to be part of Teochew. Despite the close relationship, Teochew and Hokkien are different enough in both pronunciation and vocabulary that mutual intelligibility is difficult.

=== Other varieties ===
Zhenan Min, a dialect island in Zhejiang province, is closely related to Quanzhou Hokkien.

Haklau Min, spoken around Shanwei and Haifeng, differs markedly from neighbouring Teochew and may represent a later migration from Zhangzhou. Linguistically, it lies between Teochew and Amoy.

Datian Min, spoken in Datian County in Fujian province, has been influenced by other Min varieties.

Sanxiang Min is spoken in a dialect island in Guangdong province.

== Phonology ==
Southern Min has one of the most diverse phonologies of Chinese varieties, with more consonants than Mandarin or Cantonese. Vowels, on the other hand, are more-or-less similar to those of Mandarin. In general, Southern Min dialects have five to six tones, and tone sandhi is extensive. There are minor variations within Hokkien, and the Teochew system differs somewhat more.

Southern Min's nasal finals consist of /m/, /n/, /ŋ/, and /~/.

=== Sino-Xenic comparisons ===
Southern Min can trace its origins through the Tang dynasty, and it also has roots from earlier periods. Hokkien people call themselves "Tang people", (Tn̂g-lâng 唐人/唐儂) which is synonymous to "Chinese people". Because of the widespread influence of the Tang culture during the Great Tang dynasty, there are today still many Southern Min pronunciations of words shared by the Sino-xenic pronunciations of Vietnamese, Korean and Japanese languages.

English	Han characters	Mandarin Chinese	Hokkien	Teochew	Cantonese	Korean	Vietnamese	Japanese (on'yomi)
book	冊	cè	chhek/chhiak/chheh	cêh4	caak3	chaek (책)	sách	saku/satsu/shaku (さく/さつ/しゃく)
bridge	橋	qiáo	kiâu/kiô	giê5/gio5	kiu4	gyo (교)	kiều	kyō (きょう)
dangerous	危險	wēixiǎn / wéixiǎn	guî-hiám	guîn5/nguín5 hiem2	ngai4 him2	wiheom (위험)	nguy hiểm	kiken (きけん)
embassy	大使館	dàshǐguǎn	tāi-sài-koán	dai6 sái2 guêng2	daai6 si3 gun2	daesagwan (대사관)	đại sứ quán	taishikan (たいしかん)
flag	旗	qí	kî	kî5	kei4	gi (기)	kì	ki (き)
insurance	保險	bǎoxiǎn	pó-hiám	bó2-hiém	bou2 him2	boheom (보험)	bảo hiểm	hoken (ほけん)
news	新聞	xīnwén	sin-bûn	sing1 bhung6	san1 man4	shinmun (신문)	tân văn	shinbun (しんぶん)
student	學生	xuéshēng	ha̍k-seng/ha̍k-sng	hak8 sêng1	hok6 saang1	haksaeng (학생)	học sinh	gakusei (がくせい)
university	大學	dàxué	tāi-ha̍k/tōa-o̍h	dai6 hag8/dua7 oh8	daai6 hok6	daehak (대학)	đại học	daigaku (だいがく)

== Writing systems ==
Both Hokkien and Teochew have romanized writing systems and also respective Chinese characters. In mainland China, it is known as Bân-lâm-bûn (閩南文), while in Taiwan, written Hokkien is known as Tâi-bûn (台文). Chinese characters are known in China and Taiwan as Hàn-jī (漢字). In Malaysia and Singapore, they are known as Tn̂g-lâng-jī (唐儂字 / 唐人字). In the Philippines, they are known as Lán-nâng-lī (咱儂字 / 咱人字) or Hàn-bûn-lī (漢文字).

The use of Chinese characters to write Hokkien remained largely unsystematic in the Ming and Qing dynasties, when characters were used to transcribe colloquial Southern Min speech in opera scripts, folk stories, and regional texts. Among the earliest extant vernacular Southern Min texts using Chinese characters is the Tale of the Lychee Mirror (traditional Chinese: 荔鏡記; simplified Chinese: 荔镜记; pinyin: Lì Jìng Jì; Pe̍h-ōe-jī: Nāi-kèng-kì / Lē-kèng-kì), written in a mix of Hokkien and Teochew. Its earliest extant manuscript dates from 1566.

Concurrently, Hokkien interaction with Dominican missionaries based in the Philippines led to the translation of Spanish doctrinal literature into Hokkien in Roman script. Early 19th century Protestant missionaries, mostly from Britain and originally based in Malacca, developed a different set of romanization schemes independently. This started with the works of Walter Henry Medhurst, later refined by Samuel Wells Williams and Elihu Doty, and culminated with the script Pe̍h-ōe-jī (POJ) as promulgated by John Van Nest Talmage, traditionally regarded as the founder of POJ. After the Treaty of Nanking was signed in 1842, the center of the writing and publishing of church literature in Southern Min shifted to Amoy, cementing its status as the de facto standard for Southern Min. When Thomas Barclay produced the first printed newspaper in Taiwan, the Taiwan Prefectural City Church News, it showed the establishment of a strong tradition of literacy in Hokkien POJ. The success of POJ resulted in its adaptation into Pe̍h-ūe-jī for Teochew in 1875.

Under Japanese rule, POJ was suppressed and then outlawed, with Taiwanese kana becoming the dominant script for Taiwanese Hokkien, although its role in daily life was much reduced. Although after World War II, the Kuomintang initially had a liberal attitude towards Southern Min, the use of POJ was put under ever increasing restrictions, leading to an outright prohibition in the 1970s.

With the lifting of martial law and Taiwan's democratization in the late 1980s and 1990s, the use of Taiwanese Hokkien increased, and various new romanizations were devised. In 2006, the Ministry of Education of Taiwan officially selected one orthography, often known as Tâi-Lô, for pedagogical use in the school system. The following year, it released the first list of Taiwanese Southern Min Recommended Characters, with subsequent lists providing further standardization of the Chinese characters used.

== History ==
The Min homeland of Fujian was opened to Han Chinese settlement by the defeat of the Minyue state by the armies of Emperor Wu of Han in 110 BC. The area features rugged mountainous terrain, with short rivers that flow into the South China Sea. Most subsequent migration from north to south China passed through the valleys of the Xiang and Gan rivers to the west, so that Min varieties have experienced less northern influence than other southern groups. As a result, whereas most varieties of Chinese can be treated as derived from Middle Chinese, the language described by rhyme dictionaries such as the Qieyun (601 AD), Min varieties contain traces of older distinctions. Linguists estimate that the oldest layers of Min dialects diverged from the rest of Chinese around the time of the Han dynasty. However, significant waves of migration from the North China Plain occurred. These include:

- The Uprising of the Five Barbarians during the Jin dynasty, particularly the Disaster of Yongjia in 311 AD, caused a tide of immigration to the south.
- In 669, Chen Zheng and his son Chen Yuanguang from Gushi County in Henan set up a regional administration in Fujian to suppress an insurrection by the She people.
- Wang Chao, also from Gushi, moved south to Fujian and was appointed its governor in 893, near the end of the Tang dynasty, and brought tens of thousands of troops from Henan. In 909, following the fall of the Tang dynasty, his younger brother Wang Shenzhi founded the Min Kingdom, one of the Ten Kingdoms in the Five Dynasties and Ten Kingdoms period.

Jerry Norman identifies four main layers in the vocabulary of modern Min varieties:

1. A non-Chinese substratum from the original languages of Minyue, which Norman and Mei Tsu-lin believe were Austroasiatic.
2. The earliest Chinese layer, brought to Fujian by settlers from Zhejiang to the north during the Han dynasty.
3. A layer from the Northern and Southern Dynasties period, which is largely consistent with the phonology of the Qieyun dictionary.
4. A literary layer based on the koiné of Chang'an, the capital of the Tang dynasty.

== See also ==
- Chinese in Singapore
- Languages of China
- Languages of Taiwan
- Languages of Thailand
- Malaysian Chinese
- Protection of the Varieties of Chinese

== Sources ==
- Baxter, William H.; Sagart, Laurent (2014), Old Chinese: A New Reconstruction, Oxford University Press, ISBN 978-0-19-994537-5.
- Norman, Jerry; Mei, Tsu-lin (1976), "The Austroasiatics in Ancient South China: Some Lexical Evidence" (PDF), Monumenta Serica, 32: 274–301, doi:10.1080/02549948.1976.11731121, JSTOR 40726203.
- Norman, Jerry (1988), Chinese, Cambridge: Cambridge University Press, ISBN 978-0-521-29653-3.
- Norman, Jerry (1991), "The Mǐn dialects in historical perspective", in Wang, William S.-Y. (ed.), Languages and Dialects of China, Journal of Chinese Linguistics Monograph Series, vol. 3, Chinese University Press, pp. 325–360, JSTOR 23827042, OCLC 600555701.
- Ting, Pang-Hsin (1983), "Derivation time of colloquial Min from Archaic Chinese", Bulletin of the Institute of History and Philology, 54 (4): 1–14.
- Yan, Margaret Mian (2006), Introduction to Chinese Dialectology, LINCOM Europa, ISBN 978-3-89586-629-6.
