= Nanlang Subdistrict =

Nanlang 南朗街道 Namlong
- Subdistrict
- Nanlang is labeled "7" on this map of Zhongshan

- Location in Guangdong
- Coordinates: 22°29′55″N 113°31′52″E
- Country: People's Republic of China
- Province: Guangdong
- Prefecture-level city: Zhongshan

Population (2020)
  - Total: 101,589
- Time zone: UTC+8 (China Standard)

Nanlang (Chinese: 南朗街道; pinyin: Nánlǎng Jiēdào), alternatively romanized as Namlong, is a subdistrict situated at the eastern periphery of the city of Zhongshan in Guangdong Province, China. The subdistrict has a population 38,000 permanent residents and a total area of 206 km^{2} (80 sq mi). Nanlang has administrative jurisdiction over the village of Cuiheng, the birthplace of Sun Yat-sen.

== Administration ==
Nanlang is directly administered by the prefectural city of Zhongshan.

== Transportation ==
The subdistrict has a station on the Guangzhou–Zhuhai Intercity Mass Rapid Transit.

== See also ==
- Nanlang dialect
