= Tan Goan-kong =

Tang Chinese general and official

Chen Yuanguang
- 陳元光
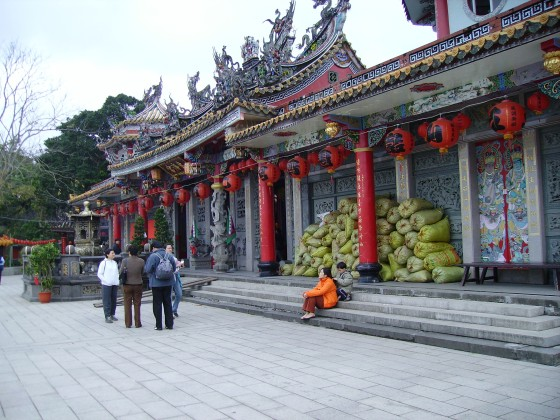
- The Zhishanyan Huijigong Temple in Taipei, Taiwan. This temple is dedicated to the "Sacred Prince, Developer of Zhangzhou," Chen Yuanguang

Personal details
- Born: 657 Gushi County, Henan
- Died: 711

Chinese name
- Traditional Chinese: 陳元光
- Simplified Chinese: 陈元光
Transcriptions
Standard Mandarin
- Hanyu Pinyin: Chén Yuánguāng
Southern Min
- Hokkien POJ: Tân Goân-kong

Chen Yuanguang (Chinese: 陳元光; pinyin: Chén Yuánguāng; Pe̍h-ōe-jī: Tân Goân-kong; 657–711), courtesy name Tingju (Chinese: 廷炬; pinyin: Tíngjù), pseudonym Longhu (龍湖; Lónghú), was a Tang dynasty general and official. He was from Gushi County, Henan. The people of Zhangzhou, Fujian, along with the descendants of immigrants from Zhangzhou to Taiwan, Singapore, Indonesia, and Malaysia, all refer to him as the "Sacred Duke, Founder of Zhangzhou" (開漳聖王; Kāi Zhāng shèngwáng; Khai Chiang Sèng-ông).

== Joining the army ==
At the age of 13, he accompanied his father Chen Zheng (simplified Chinese: 陈政; traditional Chinese: 陳政; pinyin: Chén Zhèng), commander of the Southern China military expeditionary force, on a march to Fujian, for the purpose of setting up a regional administration. In April of the second year of the Emperor Gaozong of Tang (677), Chen Zheng died in the line of duty, Chen Yuanguang took over his father's duties, and led the troops in place of his father. At this time, the emperor granted him the title "General of the left guard, and jade bell defender of the county seat". He then proceeded to quell uprisings by local ruffians such as Chen Qian (simplified Chinese: 陈谦; traditional Chinese: 陳謙; pinyin: Chén Qiān) of Guangdong, as well as Miao Zicheng (Chinese: 苗自成) and Lei Wanxing (simplified Chinese: 雷万兴; traditional Chinese: 雷萬興; pinyin: Léi Wànxīng), both of whom were leaders of a bandit gang named the "savage colleagues". As a result, the southern Fujian region was pacified, and Chen Yuanguang was promoted to the rank of senior magistrate of upright character, and granted the title of commander of the Southern China military expeditionary force.

== Settling Zhangzhou ==
The Zhangzhou of Chen Yuanguang's time was a place where dozens of various ethnic tribes, known in records by the name "She", were mixed together with ethnic Han peoples. Chen Yuanguang believed that courtesy trumped the use of military force as a tactic for winning over the local people. In order to strengthen his authority, he submitted an application to the emperor to grant prefecture status to the areas between Zhangzhou and Quanzhou. In the second year of the Emperor Ruizong of Tang (686), Wu Zetian approved the application, and issued a decree which granted permission for the creation of the state of Zhangzhou. Zhangzhou was to have jurisdiction over Zhangpu and Huaien Counties. Wu Zetian also ordered that Chen Yuanguang be given the position of chief magistrate of Zhangzhou, as well as commissioner of Zhangpu County.

== Pacifying Fujian ==
After this, Chen Yuanguang established order among the various hamlets, built fortresses, trained troops, and pacified the border areas. As a result, the entire area, from Quanzhou in the north to Chaozhou in the south, and from Ganzhou in the west to the islands in the Taiwan Strait, became stable and prosperous. He then introduced advanced farming and production techniques to the area, and oversaw the planting of economically sound crops such as rice, flax, sugarcane, bananas, litchis, longan and flowers.

On November 5, in the second year of the second reign of the Emperor Ruizong of Tang (711), the children of Miao Zicheng and Lei Wanxing staged a rebellion in Chaozhou, then hid in the high mountains. After Chen Yuanguang heard the news, he led a troop of light cavalry to defend against the rebels. He fought the whole day long, but was killed by the sword of the enemy general, whose name was Lan Fenggao (simplified Chinese: 蓝奉高; traditional Chinese: 藍奉高; pinyin: Lán Fènggāo). The people of Zhangzhou were devastated. To them, it was as if a parent had died. Chen Yuanguang was buried at Daqiyuan. Later on, his remains were moved to Zhangzhou.

== Respect and admiration from his descendants ==
Chen Yuanguang's efforts at developing the regions near Zhangzhou and Chaozhou, received praise from numerous succeeding emperors. In the first year of the Emperor Xuanzong of Tang (712), the emperor granted Chen Yuanguang the title of "the great general, and defender of the leopard scabbard". He also gave him the title of "Marquis of Zhangzhou, the serene, loyal, resolute, and beneficent". Later he also gave him the title "Marquis of the Ying River", and ordered a great shrine built in his honor. The Emperor Huizong of Song donated a horizontal inscription which read, "Temple of Awesome Kindness" (simplified Chinese: 威惠庙; traditional Chinese: 威惠廟; pinyin: wēi huì miào). The Emperor Xiaozong of Song granted Chen Yuanguang the title "Defender Prince of Guangdong and brilliant spirit who accommodates brightness and ferocity". In the Ming dynasty, his title was again changed, this time to "Marquis of brightness and ferocity". The people of the Zhangzhou region call him the "Sacred Duke, Founder of Zhangzhou." Temples dedicated to him have proliferated in Fujian, Taiwan and Southeast Asia. There are more than 100 "Sacred Duke Temples" (simplified Chinese: 圣王庙; traditional Chinese: 聖王廟; pinyin: shèng wáng miào) in Zhangpu County alone. There are also more than 100 temples dedicated to Kai Zhang Sheng Wang in Taiwan. Many people continue to worship at the temples dedicated to him, especially by the Tan (Chen) clans from Hokkien origin worldwide. In recent years, the Zhangzhou municipal government commemorated Chen Yuanguang by naming one of its main city streets Yuanguang North Road.

== Temples dedicated to Kai Zhang Sheng Wang ==
- Chih Shan Yen Hui Chi Temple in Shilin District, Taipei, Taiwan
- Shengwang Temple in Changhua City, Changhua County Taiwan
- Yong'an Temple in Mailiao, Yunlin County, Taiwan
- Eng Chuan Tong Tan Kongsi, Penang, Malaysia
- Po Chiak Keng (Tan Si Chong Su), Singapore

== Bibliography ==
- 彭友智, 非常道: 道教諸神不為人知的故事
