= Shaxi, Zhongshan =

Shaxi 沙溪镇
- Town
- Shaxi is labeled '13' on this map of Zhongshan

- Location within Guangdong
- Coordinates: 22°30′32″N 113°19′17″E
- Country: People's Republic of China
- Province: Guangdong
- Prefecture-level city: Zhongshan
- Time zone: UTC+8 (China Standard)

Shaxi (simplified Chinese: 沙溪镇; traditional Chinese: 沙溪鎮; pinyin: Shāxī Zhèn) is a town under the administration of the prefecture-level city of Zhongshan in Guangdong Province, China, located to the west of downtown Zhongshan. The township covers an area of 55 km^{2} (21 sq mi) and had a population of 223,625 in 2020, including 100,000 migrant workers. It is administered by 15 neighborhoods and one community committee (社区).

The town is the ancestral hometown for about 70,000 overseas Chinese in such organizations as the Hook Sin Tong. The Town speaks a unique language called the Longdu dialect.

In 2002, the GDP of Shaxi reached RMB 2.1 billion and foreign exchange earnings topped RMB 147 million. It is one of the leading manufacturing centers of casual clothing in the world producing blue jeans and shirts. Each year it holds one of the world's largest trade shows for casual wear, the Chinese International Casual Wear Trade Show (中国休闲服装博览会).

In 2002, it was designated as "China's Most Famous Town for Casual Wear" by the Chinese Textile Industry Association and Chinese Garment Association. There are currently 710 clothing manufacturers in the town, employing approximately 43,000 workers. In 2002, the township produced over 200 million garments, earning RMB 6.3 billion in sales and US$123 million in foreign currency.

The sweatshop conditions of the Lifeng Clothes Factory (丽锋服饰制衣有限公司) in Shaxi while producing Vigaze Jeans, a company based in Istanbul, were featured in the 2005 documentary China Blue.
