= Leizhou Min =

Min Chinese dialect of China

- Leizhounese
- [lɔi˩ uɛ˨˦]
- Pronunciation: [lɔi˩ uɛ˨˦] (Lei city dialect)
- Native to: China, overseas communities
- Region: Leizhou Peninsula in southwestern Guangdong
- Native speakers: around 2.8 million in China (2004)
- Language family: Sino-Tibetan: Sinitic; Chinese; Min; Coastal Min; Southern Min?; Qiong–Lei; Leizhou Min
- Early forms: Proto-Sino-Tibetan: Old Chinese (Note: Min is believed to have split from Old Chinese, rather than Middle Chinese like other varieties of Chinese.); Proto-Min
- Dialects: Zhanjiang

Language codes
- ISO 639-3: luh
- Glottolog: leiz1236
- Linguasphere: 79-AAA-jj
- Leizhou Min

Leizhou or Luichew Min (simplified Chinese: 雷州话; traditional Chinese: 雷州話; pinyin: Léizhōuhuà, [lěɪʈʂóʊ xwâ]) is a branch of Min Chinese spoken in Leizhou city, Xuwen County, Mazhang District, most parts of Suixi County and also spoken inside of the linguistically diverse Xiashan District. In the classification of Yuan Jiahua, it was included in the Southern Min group, though it has low intelligibility with other Southern Min varieties. In the classification of Li Rong, used by the Language Atlas of China, it was treated as a separate Min subgroup. Hou Jingyi combined it with Hainanese in a Qiong–Lei (琼雷) group.

== Phonology ==
Leizhou Min has 17 initials, 47 rimes and 8 tones.

=== Initials ===
			Bilabial	Alveolar	Velar	Glottal
Nasal			m 魔	n 娜	ŋ 俄	
Plosive	voiced		b 磨			
Plosive	voiceless	unaspirated	p 波	t 刀	k 哥	
Plosive	voiceless	aspirated	pʰ 坡	tʰ 駝	kʰ 戈	
Fricative	voiced			z 尿		
Fricative	voiceless			s 所		h 何
Affricate	voiceless	unaspirated		t͡s 槽		
Affricate	voiceless	aspirated		t͡sʰ 切		
Lateral approximant				l 羅		
zero consonant			zero consonant 窩			

The phoneme given here as /b/ is described by Li and Thompson instead as /v/.

=== Rimes ===
	i 濟	u 敷
a 爸	ia 兵	ua 瓜
ɛ 馬	iɛ 爺	uɛ 妹
ɔ 波	iɔ 漿	
ai 派		uai 蒯
au 包	iau 彪	
ɛu 嘔	iu 休	
ɔi 矮		ui 拉
m̩ 唔		
am 耽	iam 添	
em 冚	im 音	
ŋ̍ 嗯	iŋ 興	uŋ 尊
aŋ 班	iaŋ 江	uaŋ 完
eŋ 冰	ieŋ 填	
ɔŋ 磅	iɔŋ 永	
ap 合	iap 臘	
ep 鑷	ip 立	
	ik 集	uk 郁
ak 達	iak 燭	uak 括
ek 德	iek 即	uek 國
ɔk 鐸	iɔk 略	

=== Tones ===
Leizhou has six tones, which are reduced to two in checked syllables.

Tone chart of the Leizhou dialect
Tone number	Tone name	Tone contour	Description
1	yin ping (陰平)	˨˦ (24)	rising
2	yin shang (陰上)	˦˨ (42)	falling (high falling)
3	yin qu (陰去)	˨˩ (21)	bottom (low falling)
4	yin ru (陰入)	˥̚ (5)	high checked
5	yang ping (陽平)	˨ (2)	low
6	yang shang (陽上)	˧ (3)	mid
7	yang qu (陽去)	˥ (5)	high
8	yang ru (陽入)	˩̚ (1)	low checked

== See also ==
- Taiwanese Hokkien
- Teochew dialect
- List of Chinese dialects
