= Sanxiang =

Sanxiang 三乡镇
- Town
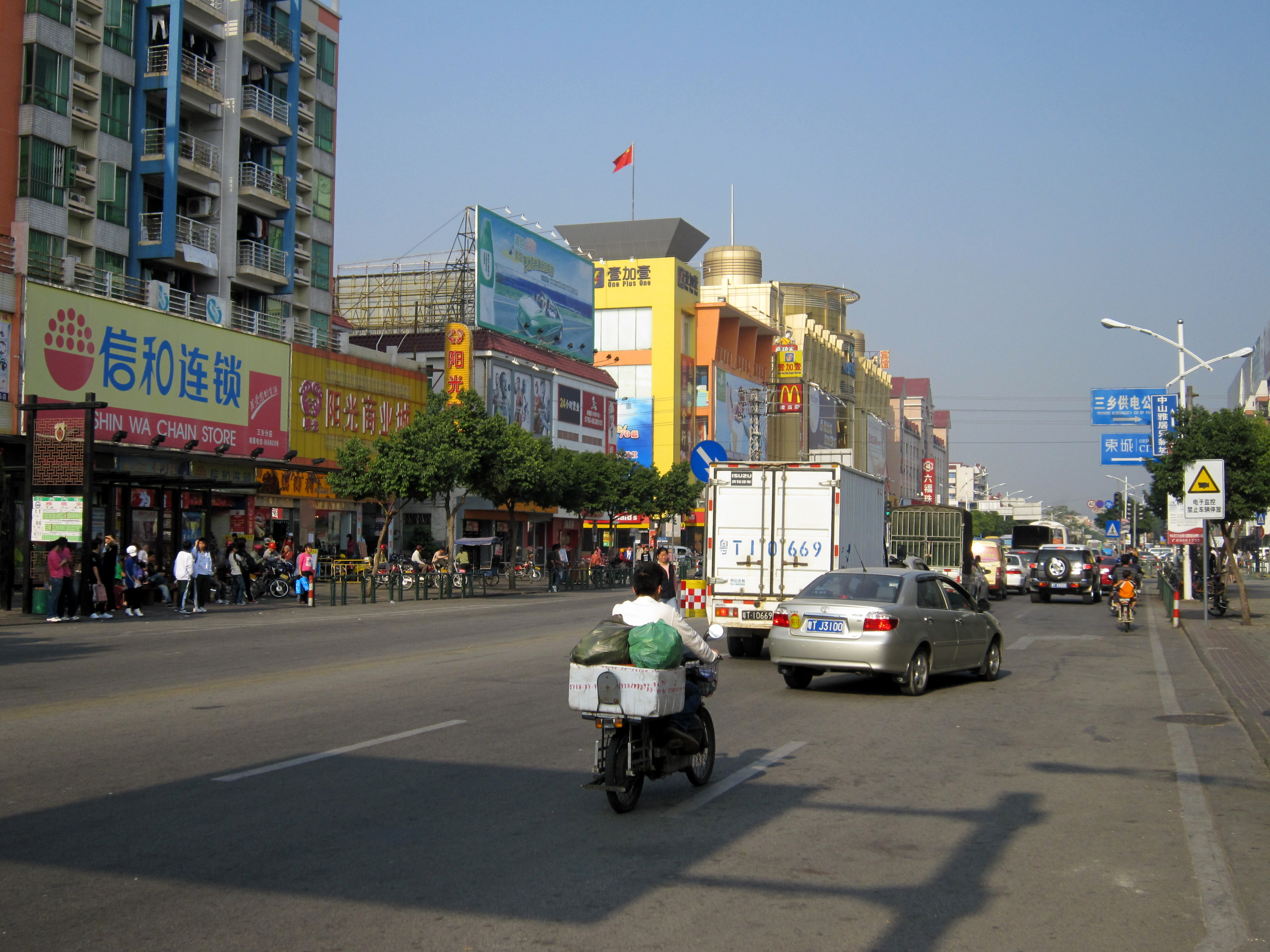
- Sanxiang town center, 2010

- Sanxiang is labeled '8' on this map of Zhongshan

- Location within Guangdong
- Coordinates: 22°21′28″N 113°26′30″E
- Country: People's Republic of China
- Province: Guangdong
- Prefecture-level city: Zhongshan
- Time zone: UTC+8 (China Standard)

Sanxiang (simplified Chinese: 三乡镇; traditional Chinese: 三鄉鎮; pinyin: Sānxiāng Zhèn; Cantonese: Sāamhēung Jan) is a town situated at the southern periphery of the city of Zhongshan, Guangdong province. In 2020 census, the population of Sanxiang was 200,165. The total area of the town is 96 square kilometres (37 sq mi). Sanxiang is much closer to Zhuhai than central Zhongshan.

== Economics ==
=== Primary industries ===
- Injection moulding, toolmaking, imaging supplies

== Culture ==
Sanxiang is one of the less busy parts of Zhongshan. It is a little known oasis of weekend homes for Hong Kong and Macau residents and a retirement haven for people from all over China.

== Notable individuals ==
- Zheng Junli
- Zheng Guanying (鄭觀應/郑观应)

== See also ==
- Sanxiang dialect
