= Dachong =

Dachong 大涌镇
- Town
- Dachong is labelled '12' in this map of Zhongshan

- Location in Guangdong
- Coordinates: 22°27′55″N 113°18′01″E
- Country: People's Republic of China
- Province: Guangdong
- Prefecture-level city: Zhongshan

Area
  - Total: 45.5 km^{2} (17.6 sq mi)

Population (2020)
  - Total: 99,763
  - Density: 2,190/km^{2} (5,680/sq mi)
- Time zone: UTC+8 (China Standard)
- Area code: 0760

Dachong (simplified Chinese: 大涌镇; traditional Chinese: 大涌鎮; pinyin: Dàchóng zhèn; Jyutping: Daai^{6}chung^{1} zan^{3}) is a town under the direct administration of the prefecture-level city of Zhongshan, in the Pearl River Delta region of Guangdong province, China.

== Location ==
It is situated at the southwest periphery of the city of Zhongshan and the eastern (left) bank of the Xi River. The town has an area of about 45.5 km^{2} (17.6 sq mi). At the 2020 census, it had a population of 99,763. It is reported there are about 10,000 Hong Kongers, people from Macau as well as overseas Chinese living here.

== History ==
Dachong was once known as Longdu (Chinese: 隆都; pinyin: Lóngdū; Jyutping: Lung^{4}dou^{1}) in the Qing Dynasty. It is known that when villages were built since the Yuan Dynasty (14th century) and situated next to a river or stream which flowed towards the ancient sea of Shiqi, the region then was named after the river stream. The central region of the town was hilly, and the highest peak, Zhuoqishan (卓旗山), is 164m high. Flat land is located at the south and the north, and rivers flow at the east and the west region.

== Economy ==
As for other towns in Zhongshan, agriculture is the main primary industry found in Dachong Town. Major agricultural outputs include rice, vegetables, fruits and cane sugar.

The production of mahogany furniture in Dachong can be traced back to the late 1970s when several carpenters started a workshop, producing broaching machines. Indeed, the early development of the mahogany furniture industry was driven by the carpenters from Zhejiang Province, who were experienced in making mahogany furniture. After the development for 20 years, the family-run furniture workshops in early years have become one of the pillar industries in Dachong. Currently there are a total of 496 enterprises engaging in the production of mahogany furniture in the town. Over a hundred specialized outlets on both sides of two main roads have formed an eye-catching avenue in the town. In 2001, the outputs of mahogany furniture reached RMB 598 million, accounting for nearly a quarter of the total industrial outputs of the whole town.

Controlling 60 percent of the national production of mahogany furniture in 2002, Dachong was dubbed the "Specialized Town of Mahogany Furniture Production of China" by China National Furniture Association in April 2003. Its mahogany furniture has earned this small town a reputation at home and abroad for its Guangdong-style that is competitive nationwide, even in Zhejiang and Jiangsu Provinces, that are the origins of mahogany furniture. The export earnings of US$4.3 million in 2002 show that Dachong furniture is also popular worldwide, with large markets in the US, Japan, Canada and Russia.

In order to consolidate its leading position in the production of mahogany furniture, producers in Dachong are restlessly upgrading their products and improving production techniques in recent years. In 2001, a technological development centre was established to develop and apply technology to the production of mahogany furniture. For example, the water-soluble paint, jointly developed by the centre and Xi'an Jiaotong University through a project involving investment of RMB 380000, aiming at reducing the production cost, and enabling the products to be more environmental friendly. The computerized drying system developed through a partnership with Guangzhou Institute of Energy Conservation of the Chinese Academy of Science, also makes the mahogany furniture more durable. Besides, under the quality control of the guild over all the mahogany furniture made in Dachong, products meeting the standards set by the town government are certified. To further develop the mahogany furniture industry, Dachong should put greater effort in registering design, image promotion and developing own brands that are not adequate currently.
