= Chen Zheng (Tang dynasty) =

Tang Chinese general

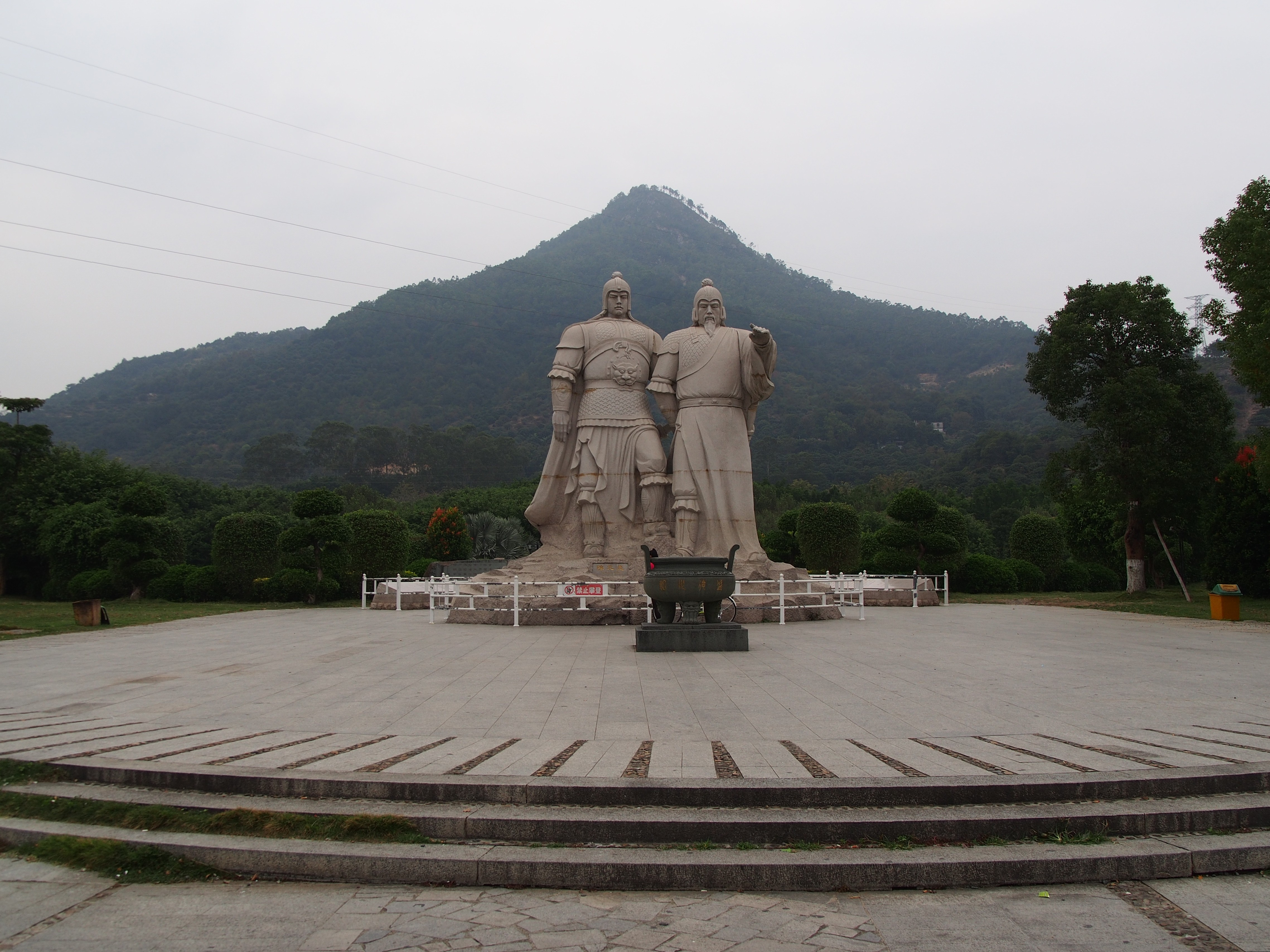
A statue of Chen Zheng and Chen Yuanguang

Chen Zheng (traditional Chinese: 陳政; simplified Chinese: 陈政; pinyin: Chén Zhèng; Pe̍h-ōe-jī: Tân Chèng; 616–677) courtesy name Yimin (Chinese: 一民; pinyin: Yīmín), pseudonym Suxuan (simplified Chinese: 素轩; traditional Chinese: 素軒; pinyin: Sùxuān), was a Tang dynasty general from Gushi County in Henan, China.

Chen Zheng was the son of Tang general Chen Ke (陳克) and the father of Chen Yuanguang. Together with son Chen Yuanguang, he was responsible for opening up and developing the city of Zhangzhou. His father was Chen Kegeng (陳克耕).
