= Datian Min =

Southern Min Chinese dialect

- 大田闽语 / 大田话
- Native to: Southern China
- Region: Datian County, Sanming Prefecture, Fujian
- Native speakers: 250,000 (2012)
- Language family: Sino-Tibetan: Sinitic; Chinese; Min; Coastal Min; Southern Min; Datian Min
- Early forms: Proto-Sino-Tibetan: Old Chinese (Note: Min is believed to have split from Old Chinese, rather than Middle Chinese like other varieties of Chinese.); Proto-Min
- Writing system: Chinese characters, Peh-oe-ji

Language codes
- ISO 639-3: None (mis)
- Glottolog: dati1239
- Linguasphere: 79-AAA-ja
- Datian Min

Datian Min (simplified Chinese: 大田闽语; traditional Chinese: 大田閩語; pinyin: Dàtián Mǐnyǔ; Pe̍h-ōe-jī: Tōa-chhân bân-gú) or Datian dialect (simplified Chinese: 大田话; traditional Chinese: 大田話; pinyin: Dàtiánhuà 'Datian speech') is a Southern Min language spoken in Datian County, Sanming City, Fujian Province, China. It has been influenced by other Min languages, including Central Min, Eastern Min, Northern Min and Puxian Min.

Datian Min developed from Hokkien, a dialect of Southern Min. Before the year 1535, this area belonged to four counties: Youxi, Dehua, Yong'an and Zhangping. Hokkien was spoken in Dehua and Zhangping, while Yong'an and Youxi spoke Central Min and Eastern Min respectively. Datian County was set up and affiliated to Yanping Fu (延平府, modern Nanping) which spoke Northern Min in 1535. Language contact occurred in the later days. The county changed affiliate to Yongchun Zhou (永春州, modern Yongchun County, spoke Hokkien dialect) in 1734, then to Yong'an Division (永安专区, modern Sanming Prefecture, spoke Central Min) in 1949. The administrative here changed so frequently that the differences between Datian Min and Hokkien dialect became more and more obvious.

Datian Min has little intelligibility with other varieties of Southern Min, and is sometimes classified as a separate branch of Min. Some Chinese scholars call it Min dialects transition area (闽方言过渡区).
