= Houlu dialect =

Datian Min Chinese dialect

- 后路话 / 後路話
- Native to: China
- Region: northwestern Datian and surrounding areas in Fujian
- Native speakers: 150,000 (2002)
- Language family: Sino-Tibetan: Sinitic; Chinese; Min; Coastal Min; Southern Min (disputed); Datian Min (disputed); Houlu dialect
- Early forms: Proto-Sino-Tibetan: Old Chinese (Note: Min is believed to have split from Old Chinese, rather than Middle Chinese like other varieties of Chinese.); Proto-Min

Language codes
- ISO 639-3: –
- Glottolog: None

The Houlu dialect (simplified Chinese: 后路话; traditional Chinese: 後路話; pinyin: Hòulùhuà) is a dialect of Datian Min, which is often classified as a part of the Southern Min group of varieties of Chinese. It is spoken in northwestern Datian County, southwestern Youxi County, and several townships in Yong'an City and Sha County in the center of Fujian Province. In Youxi County, it is known as the Xinqiao dialect (新桥话; 新橋話; Xīnqiáohuà). It mixes several Min languages nearby such as Northern Min, Central Min, Eastern Min, and Hokkien. The main area where Houlu is spoken is northern Datian including Guangping, Jianshe, Qitao, Wenjiang, and Meishan, covering 22.45% of the population of Datian. The variety spoken in Guangping can be regarded as the representative. Although Houlu includes some features of Min Zhong and other Min languages, it is still not mutually intelligible with other Min Nan dialects.

== Phonology ==
In the Houlu dialect, there are 18 initials (not including the null initial), 41 rimes and 7 tones.

=== Initials ===
p 崩	pʰ 棚	b 茅	
t 东 / 東	tʰ 通	n 篮 / 籃	l 老
ts 宗	tsʰ 充	s 商	
tɕ 正	tɕʰ 车 / 車	ɕ 城	ʑ 央
k 工	kʰ 空	g 牙	x 丰 / 豐

=== Rimes ===
a 亚 / 亞	e 台	ø 因	ə 翁	ɯ 郭	o 窝 / 窩	ɔ 盒	i 衣	u 乌 / 烏	y 于			
ai 备 / 備	aɯ 宝 / 寶	ia 夜	ie 役	iə 用	iɯ 腰	io 要	iɔ 优 / 優	ua 拖	ue 坏 / 壞	uə 恩	ui 妹	yø 水
aŋ 办 / 辦	ɔuŋ 堂	iɔŋ 羊	uaŋ 毯	uŋ 般	ŋ̍ 黄 / 黃							
ã 坎	ẽ 哀	ə̃ 担 / 擔	ĩ 见 / 見	ỹ 桥 / 橋	aĩ 边 / 邊	iã 院	iə̃ 岩	uĩ 门 / 門				
aʔ 肉	ɔʔ 北	ieʔ 笔 / 筆										

=== Tones ===
Tone name	dark level 陰平 / 阴平	light level 陽平 / 阳平	dark rising 陰上 / 阴上	light rising 陽上 / 阳上	dark departing 陰去 / 阴去	dark entering 陰入 / 阴入	light entering 陽入 / 阳入
Tone contour	˧ (33)	˨˦ (24)	˦˨ (42)	˥ (55)	˨˩ (21)	˨˩ (21)	˧ (33)

== Sources ==
- Datian County Local Chronicles Editorial Board, ed. (1996). Datian Xianzhi 大田县志 [Datian Annals] (in Chinese). Vol. 33: 方言. Beijing: Zhonghua Book Company. ISBN 7-101-01536-0.
- Sanming City Local Chronicles Editorial Board, ed. (2002). Sanming Shizhi 三明市志 [Sanming Annals] (in Chinese). Vol. 53: 方言. Beijing: Fangzhi Chubanshe. ISBN 7-80122-619-4.
- Mei, Tsu-lin (1970), "Tones and prosody in Middle Chinese and the origin of the rising tone", Harvard Journal of Asiatic Studies, 30: 86–110, doi:10.2307/2718766, JSTOR 2718766
- Pulleyblank, Edwin G. (1984), Middle Chinese: A study in Historical Phonology, Vancouver: University of British Columbia Press, ISBN 978-0-7748-0192-8
