= Shaxian dialect =

Central Min Chinese dialect of Fujian, China

- 沙縣事
- Pronunciation: [sa˦˦ sɪ̃˦˦ sai˨˦]
- Native to: Southern China
- Region: Sha County, Sanming, Fujian
- Language family: Sino-Tibetan: Sinitic; Chinese; Min; Inland Min; Central Min; Shaxian dialect
- Early forms: Proto-Sino-Tibetan: Old Chinese (Note: Min is believed to have split from Old Chinese, rather than Middle Chinese like other varieties of Chinese.); Proto-Min

Language codes
- ISO 639-3: –
- Glottolog: None
- Linguasphere: 79-AAA-hba

Shaxian dialect (Central Min: 沙縣事, Mandarin Chinese: 沙縣話) is a dialect of Central Min Chinese spoken in Sha County, Sanming in Western Fujian Province of China.

== Phonology ==
Shaxian dialect has 17 initials, 36 rimes and 6 tones.

=== Initials ===
		Bilabial		Alveolar		Postalveolar		Velar	
		Voiceless	Voiced	Voiceless	Voiced	Voiceless	Voiced	Voiceless	Voiced
Nasal			(m) 罵慢		(n) 鈴南				(ŋ) 雅眼
Stop	Tenuis	p 布婆	b 母毛	t 東大				k 哥間	g 蟻額
Stop	Aspirated	pʰ 普抱		tʰ 通頭				kʰ 溪欠	
Affricate	Tenuis			ʦ 酒曹		ʧ 朱足			
Affricate	Aspirated			ʦʰ 秋春		ʧʰ 出穿			
Fricative				s 心沙		ʃ 水船		x 好興	
Lateral					l 納力				
Zero consonant		zero consonant 影黃							

Notes:

1. /tʃ/, /tʃʰ/, /ʃ/ only connected with round mouth rimes (撮口呼韻母);
2. /b/, /l/, /g/ cannot be connected with nasal vowel rimes;
3. /m/, /n/, /ŋ/ only connected with nasal vowel rimes.

=== Rimes ===
ɯ / ɤ 資 / 子	i / e 西 / 死
u / o 故 / 古	y / ø 居 / 舉
iu / io 抽 / 丑	ui / ue 追 / 嘴
yɯ / yɤ 威 / 偉	o / ɔ 波 / 保
io / iɔ 腰 / 約	e / ɛ 排/八
ye / yɛ 吹 / 血	a 家
ia 遮	ua 瓜
ya 蟻	ai 猜
uai 乖	au 交
iau 曉	ŋ̍ 光
aŋ 講	uaŋ 望
ɛiŋ 心	iɛiŋ 英
yɛiŋ 永	ɔuŋ 風
œyŋ 鍾	iŋ 廠
ĩ / ẽ 仙 / 險	uĩ / uẽ 翻/粉
yĩ / yẽ 根 / 卷	ɔ̃ 爭
iɔ̃ 驚	ɔ̃i 燈

Some rimes come in pairs in the above table, and they are closely related with the tones: the one to the left only exist in dark level (陰平), light level (陽平), light rising (陽上) and departing (去聲); while the other only exist in dark rising (陰上) and entering (入聲). It can be compared with close and open rimes of Fuzhou dialect, Eastern Min.

=== Tones ===
No.	1	2	3	4	5	6
Tone name	dark level 陰平	light level 陽平	dark rising 陰上	light rising 陽上	departing 去聲	entering 入聲
Tone contour	˧ 33	˧˩ 31	˨˩˨ 21	˥˧ 53	˨˦ 24	˨˩˨ 212
Example Hanzi	詩	南	始	是	四	失

The entering tones in Sanming dialect don't have any entering tone coda (入聲韻尾) such as /-ʔ/, /-p̚/, /-t̚/ and /-k̚/. It's quite different from many other Chinese dialects.

=== Tone sandhi ===
Shaxian dialect has extremely extensive tone sandhi rules: in an utterance, only the last syllable pronounced is not affected by the rules.

The two-syllable tonal sandhi rules are shown in the table below (the rows give the first syllable's original citation tone, while the columns give the citation tone of the second syllable):

	dark level 33	light level 31	dark rising 21	light rising 53	departing 24	entering 212
dark level 33	44					
light level 31	33					
dark rising 21	55					
light rising 53	dark rising (21)					
departing 24	dark rising (21)			44		dark rising (21)
entering 212	4					

Some rimes may change their pronunciation because they are closely related with the tones (see above).
