= Yong'an (disambiguation) =

Yong'an is a county-level city in Fujian, China.

Yongan may also refer to:

== Locations ==
- Yong'an District, in Kaohsiung, Taiwan
- Yong'an Temple, temples in Beijing and on Taiwan
- Yongan Market Station, a Taipei Metro station in Taipei, Taiwan
- Yong'an Brook, the upper stretch of the Jiao River, Zhejiang, China
- Historical name or Mengshan County, Guangxi, China

=== Subdistricts in People's Republic of China ===
- Yong'an Subdistrict, Jiamusi, in Qianjin District, Jiamusi, Heilongjiang
- Yong'an, Wuhan, in Caidian District, Wuhan, Hubei
- Yong'an, Xianning, in Xian'an District, Xianning, Hubei
- Yong'an, Xuzhou, in Quanshan District, Xuzhou, Jiangsu
- Yong'an, Zibo, in Zhoucun District, Zibo, Shandong

=== Towns in People's Republic of China ===
- Yong'an, Anhui, in Suzhou, Anhui
- Yong'an, Dianjiang County, in Dianjiang County, Chongqing
- Yong'an, Fengjie County, in Fengjie County, Chongqing
- Yong'an, Guangdong, in Zhaoqing, Guangdong
- Yong'an, Guangxi, in Bobai County, Guangxi
- Yong'an, Fenggang County, in Fenggang County, Guizhou
- Yong'an, Xishui County, Guizhou, in Xishui County, Guizhou
- Yong'an, Jidong County, in Jidong County, Heilongjiang
- Yong'an, Suihua, in Suihua, Heilongjiang
- Yong'an, Liuyang, in Liuyang, Changsha, Hunan
- Yong'an, Inner Mongolia, in Tuquan County, Inner Mongolia
- Yong'an, Dashiqiao, in Dashiqiao, Liaoning
- Yong'an, Dongying, in Dongying, Shandong
- Yong'an, Hunyuan County, in Hunyuan County, Shanxi
- Yong'an, Fenxi County, in Fenxi County, Shanxi
- Yong'an, Chengdu, in Chengdu, Sichuan
- Yong'an, Zigong, in Zigong, Sichuan
- Yong'an, Zhongjiang County, in Zhongjiang County, Sichuan
- Yong'an, Beichuan County, in Beichuan Qiang Autonomous County, Sichuan
- Yong'an, Neijiang, in Neijiang, Sichuan
- Yong'an, Nanchong, in Nanchong, Sichuan
- Yong'an, Tongjiang County, in Tongjiang County, Sichuan

=== Townships in People's Republic of China ===
- Yong'an Township, Yongfu County, in Yongfu County, Guangxi
- Yong'an Township, Du'an County, in Du'an Yao Autonomous County, Guangxi
- Yong'an Township, Guizhou, in Songtao Miao Autonomous County, Guizhou
- Yong'an Township, Heilongjiang, in Jixian County, Heilongjiang
- Yong'an Township, Jiangxi, in Jiujiang, Jiangxi
- Yong'an Township, Jilin, in Nong'an County, Jilin
- Yong'an Township, Shandong, in Zaozhuang, Shandong
- Yong'an Township, Sichuan, in Puge County, Sichuan
- Yong'an Township, Zhejiang, in Rui'an, Zhejiang

== Historical eras ==
- Yong'an (258–264), era name used by Sun Xiu, emperor of Eastern Wu
- Yong'an (304), era name used by Emperor Hui of Jin
- Yong'an (401–412), era name used by Juqu Mengxun, king of Northern Liang
- Yong'an (528–530), era name used by Emperor Xiaozhuang of Northern Wei
- Yong'an (1098–1100), era name used by Emperor Chongzong of Western Xia

== See also ==
- Yong'an dialect of Central Min (also known as Min Zhong)
- Wing On, a Hong Kong department store, also operated in Shanghai
  - Wing On House, a building in Central, Hong Kong
  - Wing On Bank, a defunct Hong Kong bank
