= Min Chinese speakers =

Min
閩民系

Total population
- Approximately 115,000,000

Regions with significant populations
- China, Southeast Asia

Languages
- Min Chinese

Religion
- Chinese folk religion

Related ethnic groups
- Other Han Chinese, Ancient Minyue people

Min-speaking peoples (simplified Chinese: 闽民系; traditional Chinese: 閩民系; pinyin: Mǐn mínxì) are a major subgroup of ethnic Han Chinese people, speaking Min Chinese languages. They mainly live or trace roots from Fujian, Hainan, Southern Zhejiang and Guangdong province's Leizhou and Chaoshan regions.

The Min Chinese are a strongly diasporic community, with emphasis on entrepreneurship through communal guanxi-based networks. Today, they play a significant role in the economies of Greater China and Southeast Asia, and are heavily represented in business and commercial sectors. In the Chinese diaspora, they form the majority of people in Taiwan and the majority of Han Chinese in Southeast Asian countries, like Thailand, Cambodia, Myanmar, Malaysia, Singapore, and the Philippines. The first two countries have majority Teochew-speaking Chinese minorities, whereas the last four house Hokkien-speaking Chinese minorities. Min-speaking enclaves are also significant among Chinese communities in the United States, the United Kingdom, Canada and Australia. In recent decades, Min-speaking Chinese have established communities across Asia, Europe, Africa and South America.

== Subgroups ==
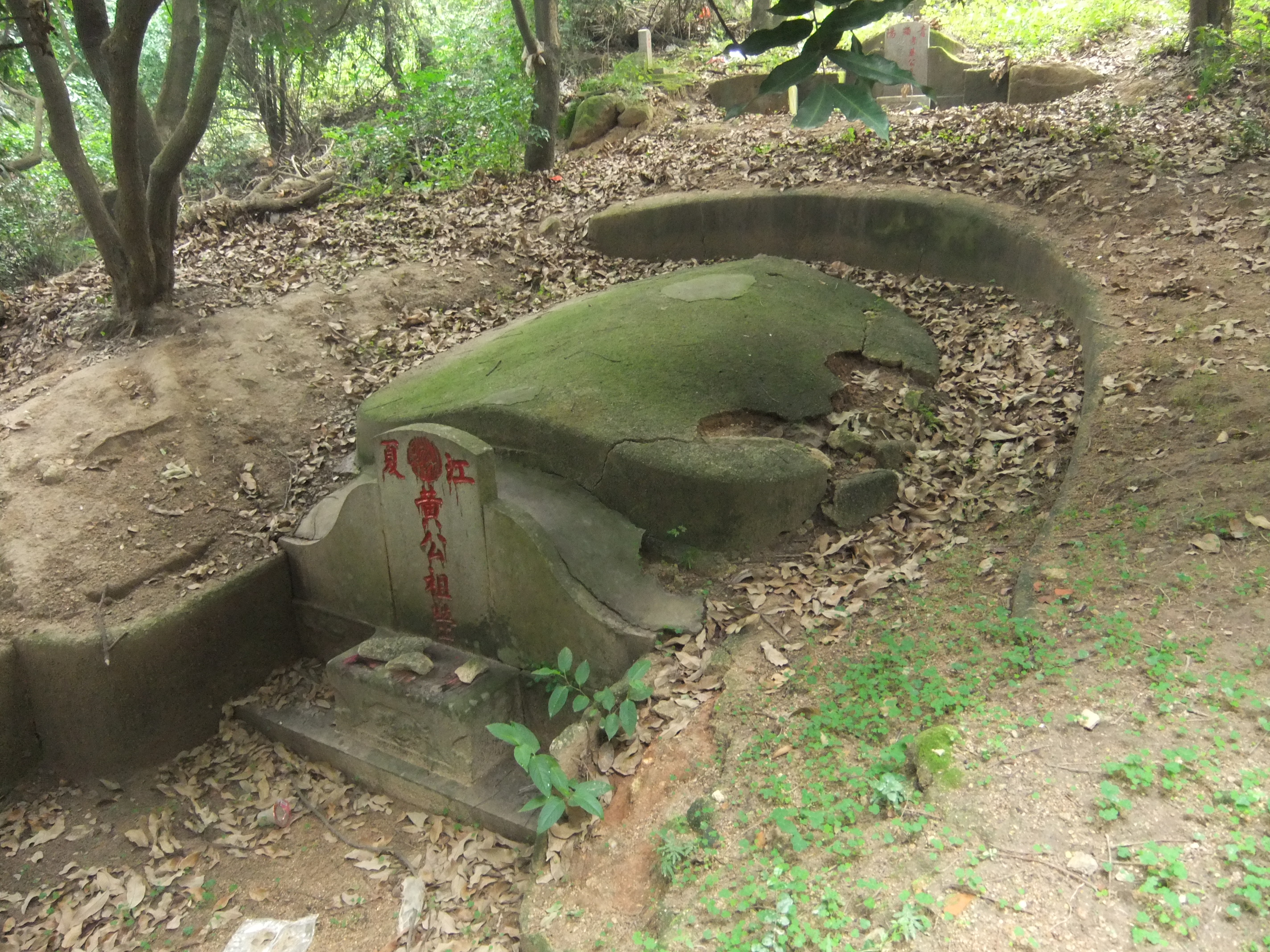
A turtle-back tomb surrounded by a horseshoe-shaped or Ω-shaped ridge, the traditional burial style of Southern Fujian.

=== China ===
==== Fujian ====
- Fuzhou people 福州人 (Eastern Min)
- Minbei people 閩北人 (Northern Min, Central Min and Shao-Jiang Min)
- Putian people 莆田人 (Pu-Xian Min)
- Hokkien people 閩南人 (Hokkien Southern Min)

==== Guangdong ====
- Teochew people 潮州人 (Teo-Swa Southern Min)
- Hailufeng people 海陸豐人 (Southern Min)
- Leizhou people 雷州人 (Qiong–Lei Min)
- Zhongshan Min people 中山閩人 (Zhongshan Min)

==== Zhejiang ====
- Zhenan people 浙南閩人 (Southern Min)

==== Hainan ====
- Hainanese people 海南人 (Qiong–Lei Min)

=== Taiwan ===
- Hoklo Taiwanese (Hokkien Southern Min)

=== Japan ===
- Chinese Japanese people from the Min-speaking area

=== Ryukyu ===
- Thirty-six families from Min

=== Philippines ===
- Hokkien Chinese Filipinos (Hokkien Southern Min)

=== Brunei ===
- Hokkien Chinese Bruneians (Hokkien Southern Min)

=== Malaysia ===
- Hokkien Malaysian Chinese (Hokkien Southern Min)
- Teochew Malaysian Chinese (Teo-Swa Southern Min)
- Hainanese Malaysian Chinese (Qiong–Lei Min)
- Foochow Malaysian Chinese (Eastern Min)
- Hockchia Malaysian Chinese (Eastern Min)

=== Singapore ===
- Hokkien Chinese Singaporeans (Hokkien Southern Min)
- Teochew Chinese Singaporeans (Teo-Swa Southern Min)
- Hainanese Chinese Singaporeans (Qiong–Lei Min)
- Henghua Chinese Singaporeans (Pu-Xian Min)

=== Indonesia ===
- Hokkien Chinese Indonesians (Hokkien Southern Min)
- Teochew Chinese Indonesians (Teo-Swa Southern Min)
- Hainanese Chinese Indonesians (Qiong–Lei Min)
- Luichew Chinese Indonesians (Qiong–Lei Min)
- Hinghwa Chinese Indonesians (Pu-Xian Min)
- Hokcia Chinese Indonesians (Eastern Min)

=== Myanmar ===
- Hokkien Chinese Burmese (Hokkien Southern Min)

=== Thailand ===
- Teochew Thai Chinese (Teo-Swa Southern Min)
- Hainanese Thai Chinese (Qiong–Lei Min)
- Hokkien Thai Chinese (Hokkien Southern Min)

=== Cambodia ===
- Teochew Chinese Cambodians (Teo-Swa Southern Min)
- Hainanese Chinese Cambodians (Qiong–Lei Min)
- Hokkien Chinese Cambodians (Hokkien Southern Min)

=== Vietnam ===
- Teochew Hoa people (Teo-Swa Southern Min)
- Hokkien Hoa people (Hokkien Southern Min)
- Hainanese Hoa people (Qiong–Lei Min)

=== Madagascar ===
- Hokkien Sinoa (Hokkien Southern Min)

== Culture ==
=== Trade and Industry ===
Migratory trading lies at the crux of Min Chinese society. Traditionally, Confucian culture looked down upon commerce, placing it at the bottom of the Four Occupations. Nevertheless, the infertile, mountainous landscape of Fujian and surrounding areas, coupled by easy access to the open ocean, compelled many Min-speaking Chinese to seek survival based on trade. By contrast to other groups, notably the Shanxi merchants, where mercantilism was rooted in a select merchant class closely tied to the Imperial Government, the merchants of Fujian were for most of their history peripheral to the centres of power. This allowed Min-speaking Chinese to carve out a cultural niche in entrepreneurship, risk-taking and diasporic migration that would pass down and sustain among the community throughout generations. By the time of the Ming Dynasty, Min-speaking communities became increasingly valued by the government as shipbuilders, navigators, and maritime merchants, and often utilised as envoys to Southeast Asia and Japan for trading and diplomacy purposes. For example, the Thirty-six families from Min were influential in the development of Confucian culture in the Ryukyu Islands. Today, the influence of entrepreneurship on Min Chinese culture is remarkable. From the towering tycoons of Shanghai, Hong Kong, Singapore and Bangkok to humble shopkeepers that range through areas as diverse as New York and Algiers, the contribution of Min-speaking Chinese to the modern economy is momentous.

Although Min-speaking Chinese groups make up only 2% of the total Chinese population, they have contributed to the economic scene of Greater China far more significantly than their numbers may suggest. During the colonial era, the Canton System of trade was heavily monopolized by merchants of Min Chinese ancestry, with Puankhequa and Howqua, both of Southern Min descent, becoming some of the wealthiest men in China in their time. These Min-speaking merchants would become inseparable to the economic fabric of Canton, even as they assimilated themselves into the Cantonese majority. Min communities have also tapped heavily into real estate markets across China, owning as much as 60 percent of properties across various second- and third-tier cities in inland China and contributing to the vitality and prosperity of local townships. Recently, Chinese of Min origin have gained considerable presence in technological sectors, as represented by tycoons such as Ma Huateng, Zhang Yiming and Wang Xing. Remittances from the overseas Min diaspora have also contributed to the political scene in China, funding Sun Yat-sen's Tongmenghui and the 1911 Xinhai Revolution, and were also important to boosting the economy of China as a whole and Fujian province on an individual scale. While the economic dominance and occasional business practices of Min Chinese entrepreneurs have generated some controversy, the community is by and large respected as an integral part of the Chinese economic framework.

Besides China, Min-speaking communities also hold substantial economic clout over the countries of Southeast Asia. Since the Ming Dynasty, Chinese merchants from Fujian and surrounding areas have created an elaborate, relational-based network across the South China Sea that would pave the wave for future Chinese economic dominance over the region, particularly following waves of xiananyang (lit. "down the South Seas") migration sparked by conflict and poverty in China. Today, the Chinese, particularly those of Min descent, would dominate commerce at every level of southeast Asian society. Unlike in China, where shared culture between the Min and local populations allowed for easier assimilation into their host communities, in Southeast Asia, Min-speaking migrants often maintained a degree of cultural distinction, creating tight-knit, self-sustaining enclaves that preserved their dialects, customs, and commercial practices. Their success hinged on a delicate balance, to forge strong economic and personal networks with indigenous populations while simultaneously retaining enough internal cohesion to protect their interests across generations. Over time, these communities expanded their influence beyond small trading posts into major urban centers, establishing powerful business conglomerates that would dominate sectors ranging from retail and shipping to banking and real estate. The legacy of this commercial dominance remains visible today, with many of Southeast Asia's largest family-run enterprises and wealthiest tycoons tracing their roots back to these early Min-speaking settlers.

Beyond China and Southeast Asia, Min-speaking Chinese communities have established significant diasporas across the Western world, including North America, Europe, and Oceania. In the United States, Min-speaking immigrants have formed enclaves in Chinatowns, such as Little Fuzhou in New York. These communities often revolve around family associations and regional networks, facilitating mutual support and business opportunities. Despite facing challenges such as language barriers and legal hurdles, many have found success in sectors like hospitality, construction, and retail. In recent decades, the Fujianese diaspora has played a pivotal role in China's economic engagement with Africa. While still dominated by large-scale, state-led infrastructure projects, the backbone of Chinese investment comes from small and medium-sized enterprises (SMEs), primarily driven by Min-speaking entrepreneurs who leverage tight-nit, clan-based networks to fill niches overlooked by larger corporations.

== See also ==
- Chinese people
- Han Chinese
- Min Chinese
