= Yong'an dialect =

Central Min Chinese dialect

- 永安事
- Pronunciation: [uã˧ um˧ sia˧˥]
- Native to: Southern China
- Region: Yong'an, Sanming, Fujian
- Language family: Sino-Tibetan: Sinitic; Chinese; Min; Inland Min; Central Min; Yong'an dialect
- Early forms: Proto-Sino-Tibetan: Old Chinese (Note: Min is believed to have split from Old Chinese, rather than Middle Chinese like other varieties of Chinese.); Proto-Min

Language codes
- ISO 639-3: –
- Glottolog: None
- Linguasphere: 79-AAA-hbc

The Yong'an dialect (Central Min: 永安事, Mandarin Chinese: 永安話) is a Central Min dialect spoken in Yong'an, Sanming in Western Fujian Province, China.

== Phonology ==
The Yong'an dialect has 17 initials, 41 rimes and 6 tones.

=== Initials ===
The initials of the Yong'an dialect are:

	Bilabial	Dental	Palato-alveolar	Velar	Glottal
Nasal / Approximant	m	n ~ l		ŋ	
Plosive	p pʰ	t tʰ		k kʰ	ʔ
Affricate		ts tsʰ	tʃ tʃʰ		
Fricative		s	ʃ		h

- The initials [n] and [l] occur in free variation.
- /m, ŋ/ can also be heard as voiced plosives [b, ɡ] in free variation.
- Palato-alveolar sounds /tʃ, tʃʰ, ʃ/ can also be heard as alveolo-palatal sounds [tɕ, tɕʰ, ɕ] in free variation among speakers.

=== Rimes ===
The Yong'an dialect has a rich set of oral and nasal vowels, but allows only -m and -ŋ as a final consonant.

	Open syllable		Nasal coda	Nasal vowel coda
Open mouth	ɹ̩ i a ɔ o ø e ɯ	aɯ ɔu	m am ɔm ãŋ ẽĩŋ	ã õ
Even mouth	i ia iɔ iø ie iɯ	iau	iam iẽĩŋ	ĩ iã iõ
Closed mouth	u uɔ ue ui		um uẽĩŋ	uã
Round mouth	y ya ye yi		ym yẽĩŋ	

=== Tones ===
The tones are:

	Middle Chinese tone			
	level	rising	departing	entering
upper	53	21	35	13
lower	32	43	35	(> lower rising)

=== Tone sandhi ===
The Yong'an dialect has extremely extensive tone sandhi rules: in an utterance, only the last syllable pronounced is not affected by the rules. The two-syllable tonal sandhi rules are shown in the table below:

Tone sandhi of first syllable
Original citation tone	Tone sandhi
upper level	lower level
lower level	remain unchanged
upper rising	lower level
lower rising	upper rising
departing	remain unchanged
entering	high level (55)

== Sources ==
- Norman, Jerry (1974). "The Initials of Proto-Min". Journal of Chinese Linguistics. 2 (1): 27–36. JSTOR 23749809.
- Zhou, Changji 周长楫; Lin, Baoqing 林宝卿 (1992). Yong'an Shi difangzhi bianweihui 永安市地方志编委会 (ed.). Yǒng'ān fāngyán 永安方言 [Yong'an Dialect] (in Chinese). Xiamen: Xiamen daxue chubanshe.
- Yong'an Shi difangzhi bianzuan weiyuanhui 永安市地方志编纂委员会 (1994). Yǒng'ān Shì zhì 永安市志 [Chorography of Yong'an City] (in Chinese). Vol. 36. Beijing Shi: Zhonghua shuju. ISBN 7-101-01280-9. Archived from the original on 2018-04-06.
