= Sanming dialect =

Central Min Chinese dialect

Sanming
- 三明事
- Pronunciation: [sɔ̃ ˥˥˧ mã˦˩ ʃia˧]
- Native to: Southern China
- Region: Sanming, Fujian
- Language family: Sino-Tibetan: Sinitic; Chinese; Min; Inland Min; Central Min; Sanming
- Early forms: Proto-Sino-Tibetan: Old Chinese (Note: Min is believed to have split from Old Chinese, rather than Middle Chinese like other varieties of Chinese.); Proto-Min

Language codes
- ISO 639-3: –
- Glottolog: None
- Linguasphere: 79-AAA-hbb

The Sanming dialect (Central Min: 三明事, Mandarin Chinese: 三明話) is a dialect of Central Min spoken in urban areas of Sanming, a prefecture-level city in Western Fujian Province, China.

== Phonology ==
The Sanming dialect has 18 initials, 37 rimes and 6 tones.

=== Initials ===
| | | Bilabial | Alveolar | Postalveolar | Velar |
|---|---|---|---|---|---|
| Nasal | | m | n | | ŋ |
| Stop | Tenuis | p | t | | k |
| Stop | Aspirated | pʰ | tʰ | | kʰ |
| Affricate | Tenuis | | ts | tʃ | |
| Affricate | Aspirated | | tsʰ | tʃʰ | |
| Fricative | | | s | ʃ | x |
| Glide | | | l | | |

- Initials /m, ŋ/ may also be heard as prenasal [mb, ŋɡ] in free variation. When the two initials are followed by non-nasalized rimes, they can be heard as voiced plosives [b, ɡ].
- Palato-alveolar sounds /tʃ, tʃʰ, ʃ/ can also be heard as alveolo-palatal sounds [tɕ, tɕʰ, ɕ] in free variation among speakers.

=== Rimes ===
| | Open syllable | | Nasal coda | Nasal vowel coda |
|---|---|---|---|---|
| Open mouth | ɹ̩ ɛ ɒ a ɯ ø | aɯ au | am aiŋ m̩ | ã ɔ̃ |
| Even mouth | i iɛ iɒ ia iɯ | iau | iam iaiŋ | iã iɔ̃ ɛ̃ |
| Closed mouth | u uɛ ui o | | ŋ̍ | uã |
| Round mouth | y yi yɛ yo | | yaiŋ | yã yɛ̃ |

=== Tones ===
| No. | 1 | 2 | 3 | 4 | 5 | 6 |
| Tone name | dark level 陰平 | light level 陽平 | dark rising 陰上 | light rising 陽上 | departing 去聲 | entering 入聲 |
| Tone contour | ˥˥˧ 553 | ˦˩ 41 | ˨˩ 21 | ˨˩˧ 213 | ˧ 33 | ˩˨ 12 |

The entering tones in the Sanming dialect do not have any entering tone coda (入聲韻尾) such as /-ʔ/, /-p̚/, /-t̚/ and /-k̚/. This feature is quite different from many other Chinese dialects.
