= Putian dialect =

Pu–Xian Min Chinese dialect

Putian
- Pó-chéng-uā / 莆田話
- Pronunciation: [pʰɔu˩˩ lɛŋ˩˧ ua˩˩]
- Native to: Southern China
- Region: Putian, Fujian
- Language family: Sino-Tibetan: Sinitic; Chinese; Min; Coastal Min; Pu–Xian Min; Putian
- Early forms: Proto-Sino-Tibetan: Old Chinese (Note: Min is thought to have split from Old Chinese, rather than Middle Chinese like other varieties of Chinese.); Proto-Min

Language codes
- ISO 639-3: –
- Glottolog: puti1238
- Linguasphere: 79-AAA-idb

Putian dialect
- Traditional Chinese: 莆田話
- Simplified Chinese: 莆田话
Transcriptions
Standard Mandarin
- Hanyu Pinyin: Pútiánhuà
Pu-Xian Min
- Hinghwa BUC: Pó-chéng-uā ([pʰɔu˩˩ lɛŋ˩˧ ua˩˩])

The Putian dialect (Pu–Xian Min: Pó-chéng-uā / 莆田話; [pʰɔu˩˩ lɛŋ˩˧ ua˩˩]) is a dialect of Pu–Xian Min Chinese spoken in urban area of Putian, which is a prefecture-level city in the southeast coast of Fujian province.

== Phonology ==
The Putian dialect has 15 initials, 40 rimes and 7 tones.

=== Initials ===
		Bilabial	Alveolar		Lateral	Velar	Glottal
Nasal		/m/ 麻	/n/ 拿			/ŋ/ 雅	
Plosive/ Affricate	Unaspirated	/p/ 巴	/t/ 打	/ts/ 渣		/k/ 家	/ʔ/ 烏
Plosive/ Affricate	Aspirated	/pʰ/ 彭	/tʰ/ 他	/tsʰ/ 査		/kʰ/ 卡	
Fricative		/β/*			/ɬ/ 沙	/ɣ/*	/h/ 下
Approximant					/l/ 拉		

=== Rimes ===
	Open syllable		Nasal Coda /-ŋ/	Glottal Coda /-ʔ/
open mouth	a 鴉	au 拗	aŋ 江	aʔ 壓
open mouth	ɒ 奥		ɒŋ 王	ɒʔ 屋
open mouth	o 科	ɔu 烏	ɔŋ 温	ɔʔ 熨
open mouth	e 裔	ai 愛	ɛŋ 煙	ɛʔ 黑
open mouth	ø 改		œŋ 熊	œʔ 郁
open mouth			ŋ 伓	
even teeth	i 衣	iu 油	iŋ 引	iʔ 益
even teeth	ia 夜	iau 要	iaŋ 鹽	iaʔ 葉
closed mouth	u 夫	ui 位	uŋ 廣	
closed mouth	ua 画	uai 歪	uaŋ 碗	uaʔ 活
round mouth	y 余		yŋ 恩	yʔ 役
round mouth	yɒ 安		yɒŋ 羊	yɒʔ 藥

=== Tones ===
No.	1	2	3	4	5	6	7
Tones	dark level 陰平	light level 陽平	rising 上聲	dark departing 陰去	light departing 陽去	dark entering 陰入	light entering 陽入
Tone contour	˥˧˧ (533)	˩˧ (13)	˦˥˧ (453)	˦˨ (42)	˩ (11)	ʔ˨˩ (21ʔ)	ʔ˦ (4ʔ)
Example Hanzi	詩巴	時爬	始把	試霸	寺罷	濕北	實拔

=== Assimilation ===
	Coda of the Former Syllable	Initial of the Latter Syllable	Assimilation	Coda of the Former Syllable	Initial of the Latter Syllable
Group A	Open syllable	/p/, /pʰ/	→	remain unchanged	/β/, /ɣ/
Group A	Open syllable	/t/, /tʰ/, /ts/, /tsʰ/, /ɬ/	→	remain unchanged	/l/
Group A	Open syllable	/k/, /kʰ/, /h/	→	remain unchanged	/ɣ/
Group A	Open syllable	/m/, /n/, /l/, /ŋ/, null initial	→	remain unchanged	remain unchanged
Group B	/-ŋ/ (nasal coda)	/p/, /pʰ/	→	/-m/	/m/
Group B	/-ŋ/ (nasal coda)	/t/, /tʰ/, /ts/, /tsʰ/, /l/, /ɬ/	→	/-n/	/n/, remain unchanged
Group B	/-ŋ/ (nasal coda)	/k/, /kʰ/, /h/, null initial	→	remain unchanged	/ŋ/
Group B	/-ŋ/ (nasal coda)	/m/, /n/, /ŋ/	→	/-m/, /-n/, /-ŋ/	remain unchanged
Group C	/-ʔ/ (glottal Coda)	/p/, /pʰ/, /m/	→	/-p̚/	remain unchanged
Group C	/-ʔ/ (glottal Coda)	/t/, /tʰ/, /ts/, /tsʰ/, /ɬ/, /l/, /n/	→	/-t̚/	remain unchanged
Group C	/-ʔ/ (glottal Coda)	/k/, /kʰ/, /ŋ/, /h/	→	/-k̚/	remain unchanged
Group C	/-ʔ/ (glottal Coda)	null initial	→	/-ʔ/	remain unchanged

=== Tone sandhi ===
Putian dialect has extremely extensive tone sandhi rules: in an utterance, only the last syllable pronounced is not affected by the rules.

The two-syllable tonal sandhi rules are shown in the table below (the rows give the first syllable's original citation tone, while the columns give the citation tone of the second syllable):

Tone sandhi of first syllable
	dark level 533	light level 13	rising 453	dark departing 42	light departing 11	dark entering ʔ21	light entering ʔ4
dark level 533	11			13			11
light level 13	11			55	42		11
rising 453	13		11	13			11
dark departing 42	55	42	55		42		55
light departing 11	11			55	42		55
dark entering ʔ21	ʔ4						
light entering ʔ4	ʔ21						
