= Sanyuanqu railway station =

Railway station in Longyan, Fujian

Sanyuanqu 三元区
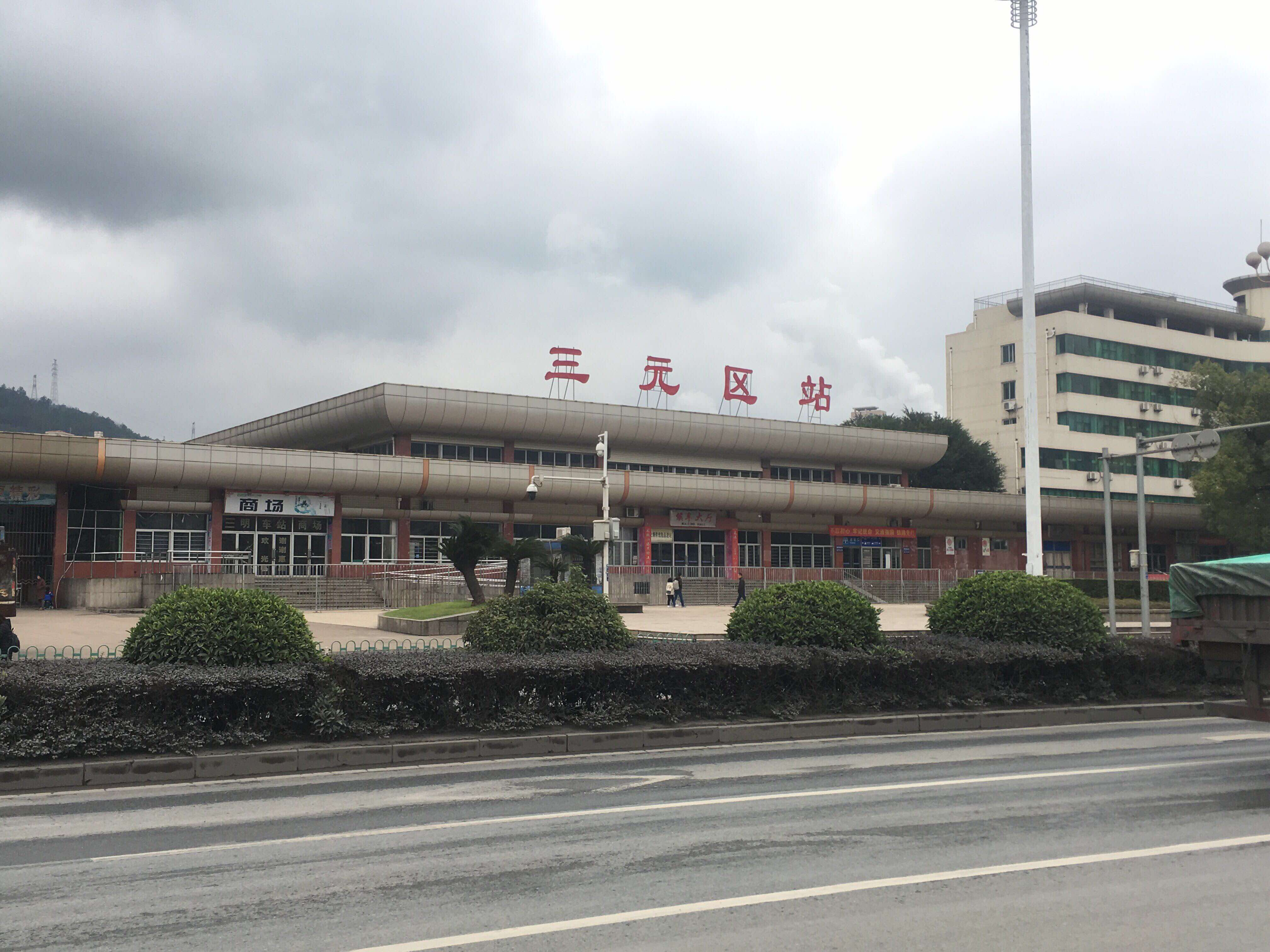
- Exterior of the station in January 2019

General information
- Location: Sanyuan District, Sanming, Fujian; China
- Coordinates: 26.243586°N 117.602273°E
- Line: Yingtan–Xiamen railway

History
- Closed: 4 January 2019
Location

Sanyuanqu railway station (Chinese: 三元区站; pinyin: Sānyuánqū zhàn; lit. 'Sanyuan District railway station') is a railway station in Sanyuan District, Sanming, Fujian, China.

== History ==
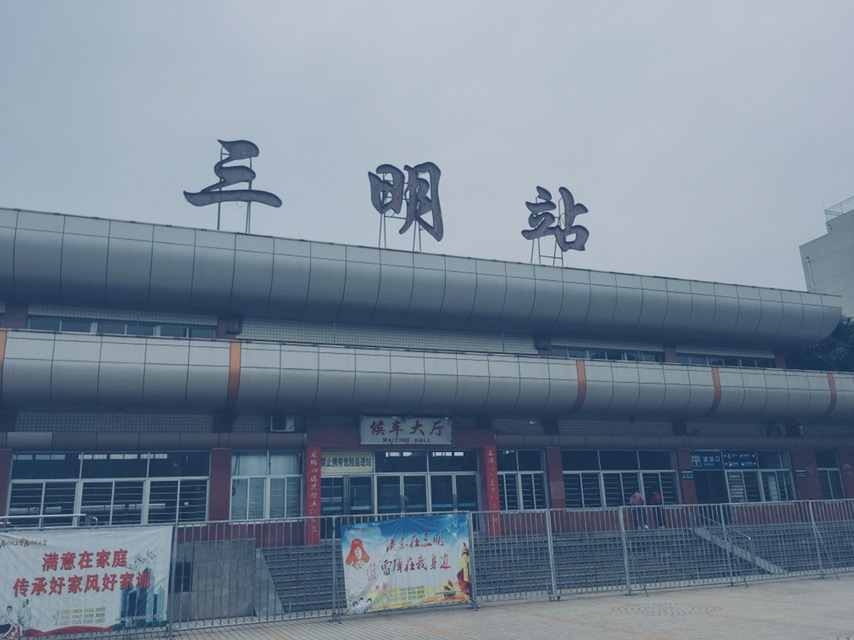
The station in 2018

Sanyuanqu railway station was previously called Sanming, however its name was changed on 15 July 2018 in preparation for the opening of the new Sanming railway station, which had previously been called Sanming South.

The final passenger service ran on 4 January 2019, after which all passenger trains on the Yingtan–Xiamen railway between Sanming North and Jiaomei were suspended.
