= Datian County =

Datian County 大田县 Tatien
- County
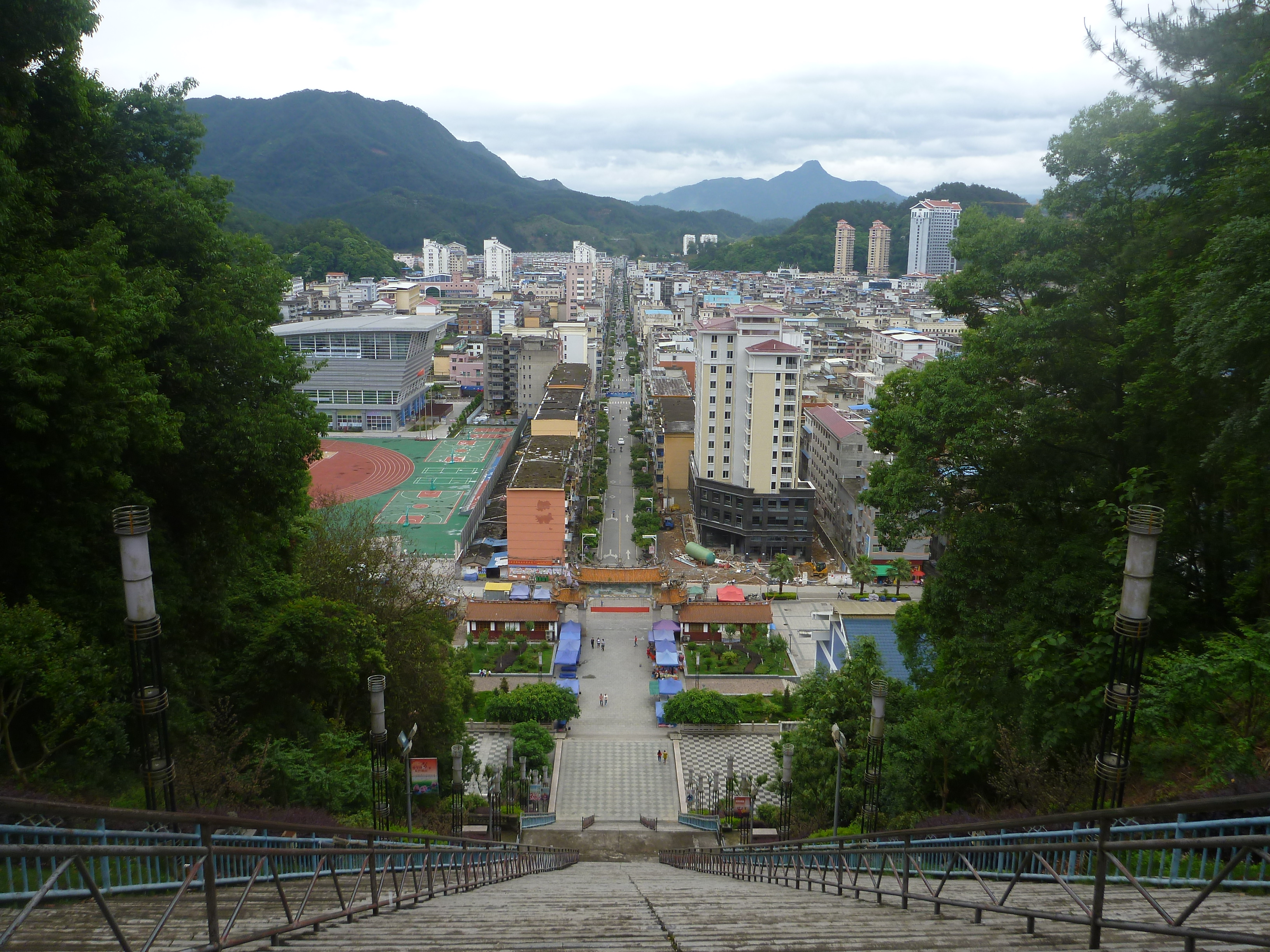

- Location in Fujian
- Coordinates: 25°46′N 117°50′E
- Country: People's Republic of China
- Province: Fujian
- Prefecture-level city: Sanming
- Time zone: UTC+8 (China Standard)

Datian (Datian; simplified Chinese: 大田县; traditional Chinese: 大田縣; pinyin: Dàtián Xiàn; Pe̍h-ōe-jī: Tāi-chhân-koān) is a county of central Fujian province, People's Republic of China. It is placed under the jurisdiction of the Sanming City.

== History ==
Before the year 1535, this area belonged to four counties: Youxi, Dehua, Yong'an and Zhangping. Datian County was set up and affiliated to Yanping Fu (延平府, modern Nanping) in 1535. The county changed affiliate to Yongchun Zhou (永春州, modern Yongchun County) in 1734, then to Yong'an Division (永安专区, modern Sanming Prefecture) in 1949.

== Administrative divisions ==
Towns:

- Junxi (均溪镇), Shangjing (上京镇), Guangping (广平镇), Taoyuan (桃源镇), Taihua (太华镇), Jianshe (建设镇), Shipai (石牌镇), Qitao (奇韬镇)

Townships:

- Huaxing Township (华兴乡), Pingshan Township (屏山乡), Wushan Township (吴山乡), Jiyang Township (济阳乡), Wuling Township (武陵乡), Xieyang Township (谢洋乡), Wenjiang Township (文江乡), Meishan Township (梅山乡), Humei Township (湖美乡), Qianping Township (前坪乡)

== Demographics ==
The population of the district was 362,566 inhabitants in 1999.

The people speak Datian Min, which is sometimes considered a dialect of Southern Min (Minnan), although due to its low intelligibility with the latter is also considered a separate branch of Min Chinese.

== Climate ==
Climate data for Datian, elevation 400 m (1,300 ft), (1991–2020 normals, extremes 1981–2010)
Month	Jan	Feb	Mar	Apr	May	Jun	Jul	Aug	Sep	Oct	Nov	Dec	Year
Record high °C (°F)	28.7 (83.7)	33.9 (93.0)	33.8 (92.8)	34.9 (94.8)	35.8 (96.4)	37.7 (99.9)	39.6 (103.3)	39.5 (103.1)	37.6 (99.7)	35.6 (96.1)	35.4 (95.7)	29.7 (85.5)	39.6 (103.3)
Mean daily maximum °C (°F)	16.6 (61.9)	18.3 (64.9)	21.1 (70.0)	25.6 (78.1)	28.5 (83.3)	31.1 (88.0)	33.7 (92.7)	32.9 (91.2)	30.4 (86.7)	26.6 (79.9)	22.5 (72.5)	17.9 (64.2)	25.4 (77.8)
Daily mean °C (°F)	10.5 (50.9)	12.3 (54.1)	15.2 (59.4)	19.6 (67.3)	22.9 (73.2)	25.6 (78.1)	27.3 (81.1)	26.6 (79.9)	24.5 (76.1)	20.4 (68.7)	16.3 (61.3)	11.5 (52.7)	19.4 (66.9)
Mean daily minimum °C (°F)	6.9 (44.4)	8.6 (47.5)	11.4 (52.5)	15.6 (60.1)	19.1 (66.4)	22.0 (71.6)	22.9 (73.2)	22.8 (73.0)	20.9 (69.6)	16.4 (61.5)	12.3 (54.1)	7.7 (45.9)	15.6 (60.0)
Record low °C (°F)	−4.2 (24.4)	−3.0 (26.6)	−3.1 (26.4)	4.1 (39.4)	8.6 (47.5)	13.5 (56.3)	18.4 (65.1)	16.7 (62.1)	11.9 (53.4)	4.9 (40.8)	−1.0 (30.2)	−6.7 (19.9)	−6.7 (19.9)
Average precipitation mm (inches)	65.3 (2.57)	92.6 (3.65)	156.8 (6.17)	169.2 (6.66)	223.8 (8.81)	249.6 (9.83)	132.7 (5.22)	207.4 (8.17)	121.8 (4.80)	49.0 (1.93)	49.2 (1.94)	45.8 (1.80)	1,563.2 (61.55)
Average precipitation days (≥ 0.1 mm)	10.3	13.0	17.2	16.2	18.5	18.5	14.3	17.3	12.6	6.5	7.5	8.3	160.2
Average snowy days	0.2	0.1	0	0	0	0	0	0	0	0	0	0.1	0.4
Average relative humidity (%)	79	79	80	79	80	81	76	80	79	76	78	78	79
Mean monthly sunshine hours	99.0	88.3	93.2	111.5	114.9	129.3	199.3	174.4	148.2	149.6	123.0	114.0	1,544.7
Percentage possible sunshine	30	28	25	29	28	32	48	44	41	42	38	35	35
Source: China Meteorological Administration
