= Guanqian =

Guanqian may refer to the following locations in China:

- Guanqian, Chizhou (观前镇), town in Guichi District, Chizhou, Anhui
- Guanqian, Changting County (馆前镇), town in Changting County, Fujian
- Guanqian, Youxi County (管前镇), town in Youxi County, Fujian
