= Houlu =

Houlu may refer to:

- Houlu dialect, a variety of Chinese
- Houlu Township in Guiping, Guangxi, China
