= Sanming University =

Coordinates: 26.1987795762°N 117.5648976281°E

- 三明学院
- Type: Public
- Established: October 2000
- Faculty: 715
- Administrative staff: 973
- Students: 14,054
- Location: Sanming, Fujian, China
- Campus: 0.88 km^{2}
- Website: www.fjsmu.edu.cn

Sanming University (Chinese: 三明学院) is a public university based in Sanming, Fujian province, China.

It was founded in October 2000.
