= Central Min =

Language

- 闽中语
- Min Zhong
- Native to: Southern China, United States (mainly California)
- Region: Yong'an, Sanming
- Native speakers: 700,000 (2004)
- Language family: Sino-Tibetan: Sinitic; Chinese; Min; Inland Min; Central Min
- Early forms: Proto-Sino-Tibetan: Old Chinese (Note: Min is believed to have split from Old Chinese, rather than Middle Chinese like other varieties of Chinese.); Proto-Min
- Dialects: Sanming; Yong'an; Shaxian

Language codes
- ISO 639-3: czo
- Glottolog: minz1235
- Linguasphere: 79-AAA-hb
- Central Min

Central Min, or Min Zhong (simplified Chinese: 闽中语; traditional Chinese: 閩中語; pinyin: Mǐnzhōngyǔ), is a part of the Min group of varieties of Chinese. It is spoken in the valley of the Sha River in Sanming prefecture in the central mountain areas of Fujian, consisting of Yong'an, the urban area of Sanming (Sanyuan and Meilie districts) and Sha County.

== Dialects ==
- Sanming dialect
- Yong'an dialect
- Shaxian dialect
