= Meilie, Sanming =

Meilie 梅列区
- District
- Location in Fujian
- Coordinates: 26°15′24″N 117°37′00″E
- Country: People's Republic of China
- Province: Fujian
- Prefecture-level city: Sanming
- Time zone: UTC+8 (China Standard)

Meilie District (Chinese: 梅列; pinyin: Méiliè) was a district of Sanming, Fujian province, People's Republic of China. Cancelled in 2021, and then merged into Sanyuan District.

== Administrative divisions ==
Subdistricts:

- Liedong Subdistrict (列东街道), Liexi Subdistrict (列西街道), Xubi Subdistrict (徐碧街道)

Towns:

- Chenda (陈大镇), Yangxi (洋溪镇)
