= Yong'an Temple =

Yong'an Temple is a partial calque of the Chinese placenames 永安寺 and 永安廟, both meaning "Temple of Everlasting Peace".

It may refer to:

- Yong'an Temple in Beijing, China
- Yong'an Temple in Mailiao, Yunlin County, on Taiwan Island

== See also ==
- Yong'an (disambiguation)
