= Thirty-six families from Min =

Thirty-six families from Min (閩人三十六姓; Bin-jin Sanjūroku sei), also translated as 36 Clans of the Min-People or 36 Min families, was a general designation of a number of Min-speaking Chinese bureaucrats and craftsmen who emigrated from Fujian to the Ryukyu Kingdom under the orders of the Ming Chinese Emperor at the invitation of king Satto. The number thirty-six is used idiomatically in Chinese numerology (Thirty-Six Stratagems, Thirty-six Views of Mount Fuji) instead of literally describing the number of families. They and their descendants lived in the community of Kumemura and served as government officials at home, and as diplomats in relations with China, Japan, and others. While the Ryukyuan historical annals Chūzan Seikan, Chūzan Seifu, and Kyūyō mention them, the Ming Veritable Records do not, casting doubt on the veracity of Ryukyuan accounts.
