= Sanyuan, Sanming =

Sanyuan 三元区
- District
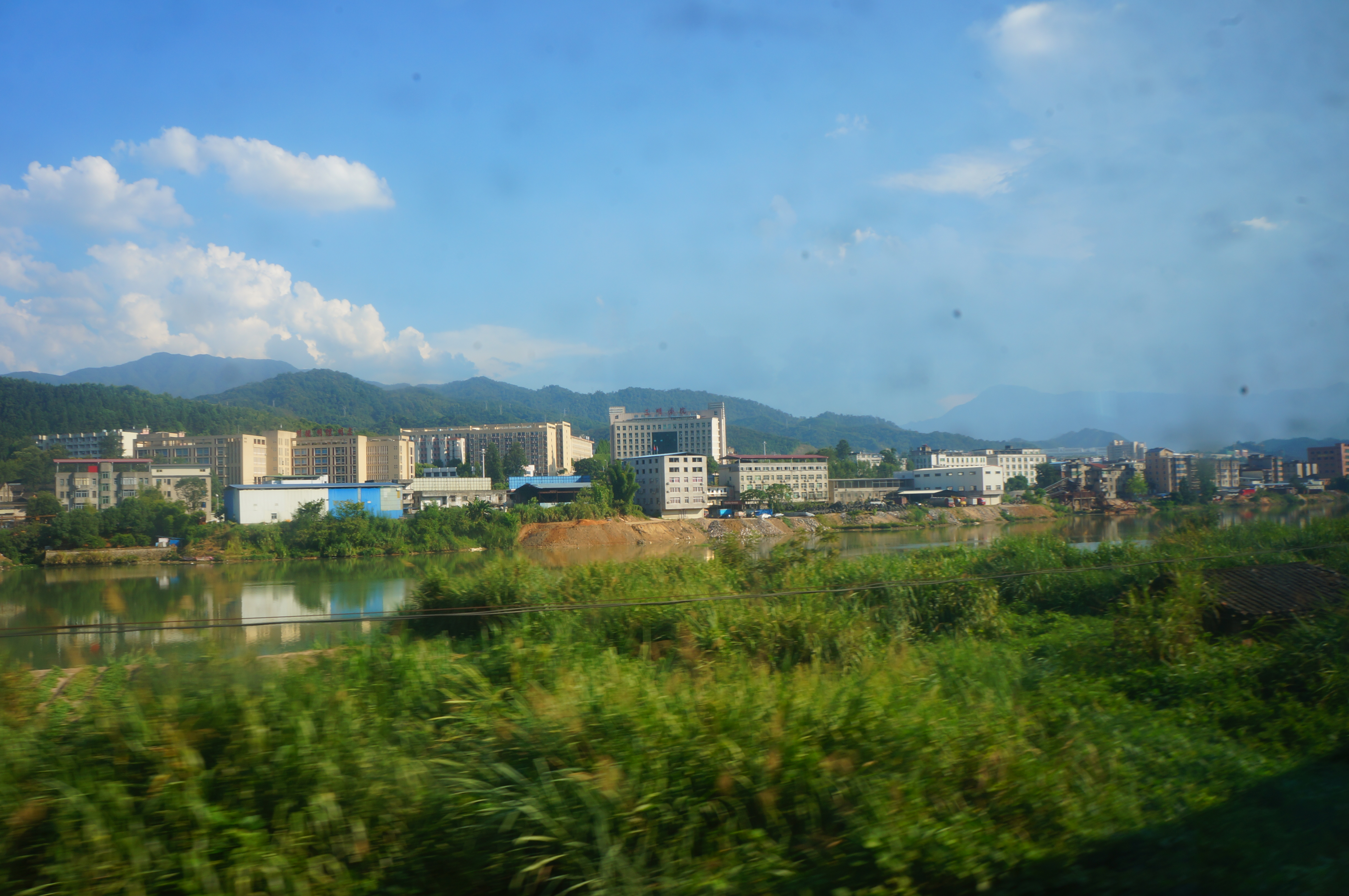

- Location in Fujian
- Coordinates: 26°14′02″N 117°36′29″E
- Country: People's Republic of China
- Province: Fujian
- Prefecture-level city: Sanming

Area
  - Total: 805 km^{2} (311 sq mi)

Population (2020)
  - Total: 187,936
  - Density: 233/km^{2} (605/sq mi)
- Time zone: UTC+8 (China Standard)

Sanyuan District (Chinese: 三元; pinyin: Sānyuán) is a district of the city of Sanming, Fujian province, People's Republic of China.

== Administrative divisions ==
Subdistricts:

- Chengguan Subdistrict (城关街道), Baisha Subdistrict (白沙街道), Fuxingbao Subdistrict (富兴堡街道), Jingxi Subdistrict (荆西街道)

Towns:

- Xinkou (莘口镇), Yanqian (岩前镇)

Townships:

- Chengdong Township (城东乡), Zhongcun Township (中村乡)

== Transportation ==
Sanming railway station is situated here. The former Sanyuanqu railway station (known as Sanming until 2018) is also located here, but was closed in January 2019.
