= Four hu =

Mandarin Chinese phonetic concept

The four hu (Chinese: 四呼; pinyin: sì hū) are a traditional way of classifying syllable finals of Mandarin dialects, including Standard Chinese, based on different glides before the central vowel of the final. They are

- kāikǒu (開口, "open mouth"), finals without a medial
- qíchǐ (齊齒, "even teeth"), finals beginning with [i]
- hékǒu (合口, "closed mouth"), finals beginning with [u]
- cuōkǒu (撮口, "round mouth"), finals beginning with [y]

The terms kāikǒu and hékǒu come from the Song dynasty rime tables describing Middle Chinese. The Qing phonologist Pan Lei divided each of these categories in two based on the absence or presence of palatalization, and named the two new categories.

This traditional classification is reflected in the bopomofo notation for the finals, but less directly in the pinyin: (Note: IPA of vowels from Lee & Zee (2003:110–111), Duanmu (2007:55–58) and Lin (2007:65))

Four hu table
Kāikǒu			Qíchǐ			Hékǒu			Cuōkǒu		
IPA	Bopomofo	Pinyin	IPA	Bopomofo	Pinyin	IPA	Bopomofo	Pinyin	IPA	Bopomofo	Pinyin
a	ㄚ	a	ia	ㄧㄚ	ia	ua	ㄨㄚ	ua			
ɤ	ㄜ	e	ie	ㄧㄝ	ie	uo	ㄨㄛ	uo (Note: uo is spelled as o after b, p, m and f.)	ye	ㄩㄝ	üe (Note: ü is spelled as u after j, q, x and y.)
ɨ	ㄭ	-i	i	ㄧ	i	u	ㄨ	u	y	ㄩ	ü
ai	ㄞ	ai				uai	ㄨㄞ	uai			
ei	ㄟ	ei				uei	ㄨㄟ	wei/-ui			
au	ㄠ	ao	iau	ㄧㄠ	iao						
ou	ㄡ	ou	iou	ㄧㄡ	you/-iu						
an	ㄢ	an	iɛn	ㄧㄢ	ian	uan	ㄨㄢ	uan	yɛn	ㄩㄢ	üan
ən	ㄣ	en	in	ㄧㄣ	in	uən	ㄨㄣ	wen/-un	yn	ㄩㄣ	ün
aŋ	ㄤ	ang	iaŋ	ㄧㄤ	iang	uaŋ	ㄨㄤ	uang			
əŋ	ㄥ	eng	iŋ	ㄧㄥ	ing	uəŋ, ʊŋ	ㄨㄥ	weng/-ong	iʊŋ	ㄩㄥ	iong
aɚ	ㄦ	er									
