= Youxi County =

Youxi County 尤溪县 Yuki
- County
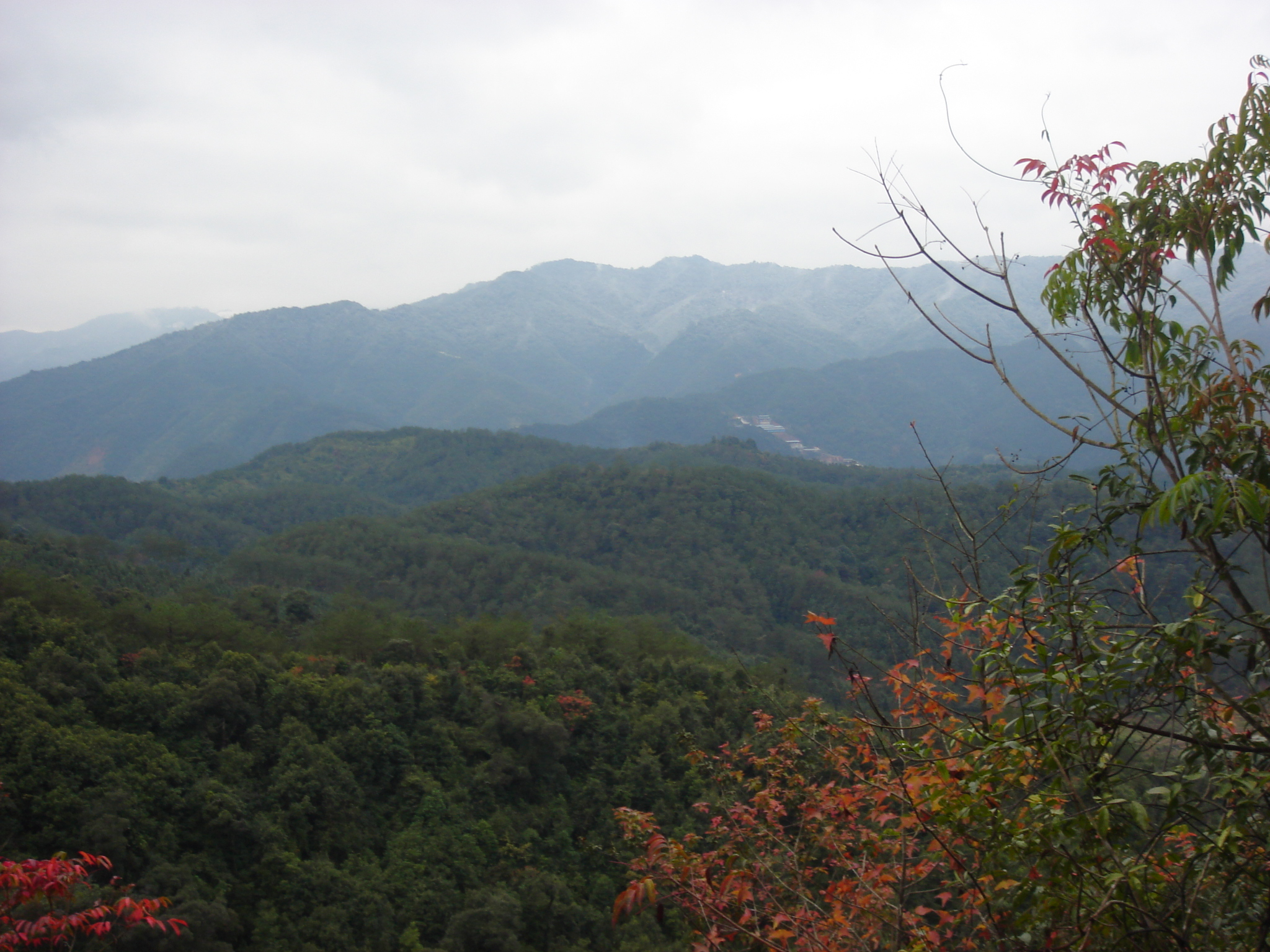

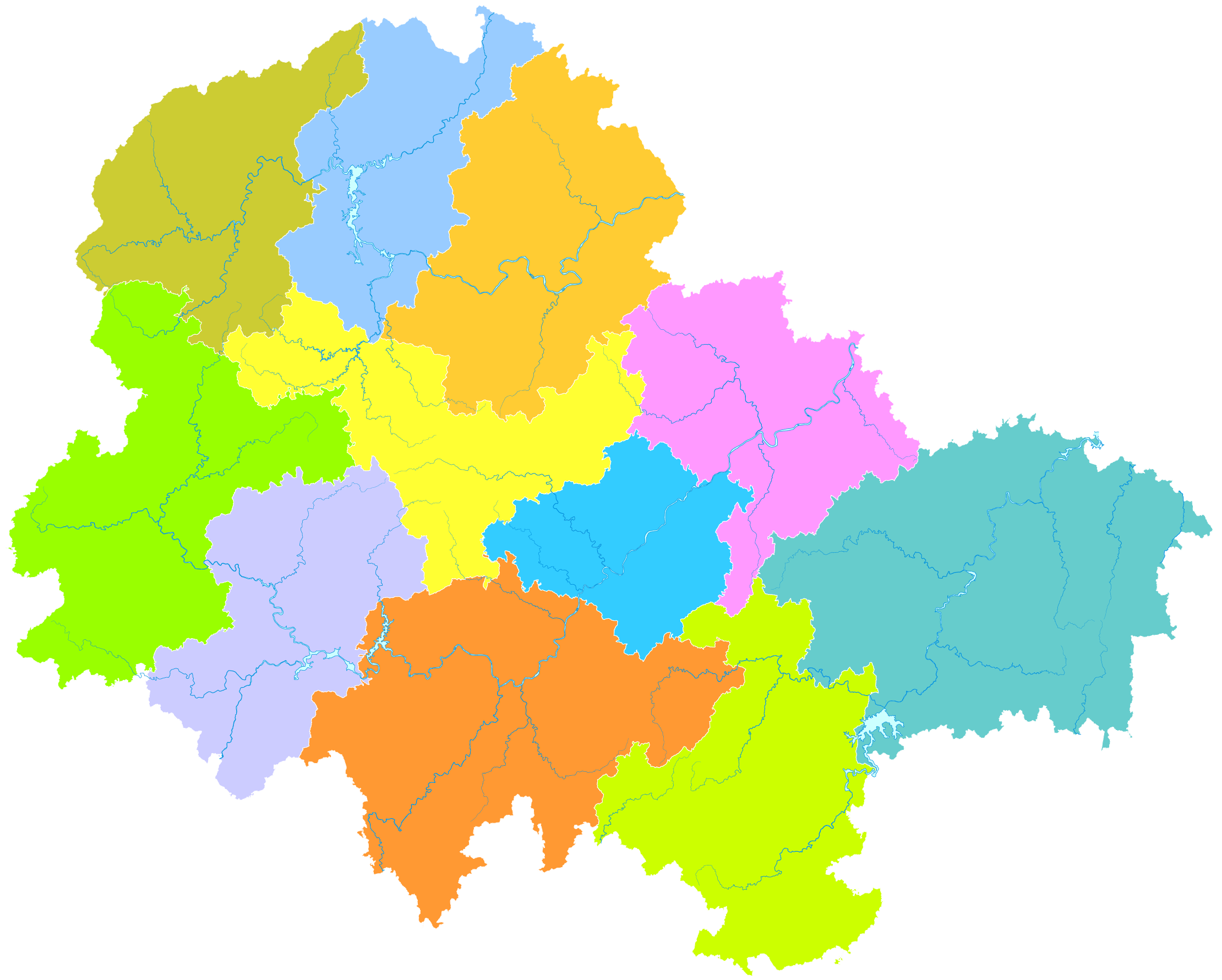
- Youxi in Sanming

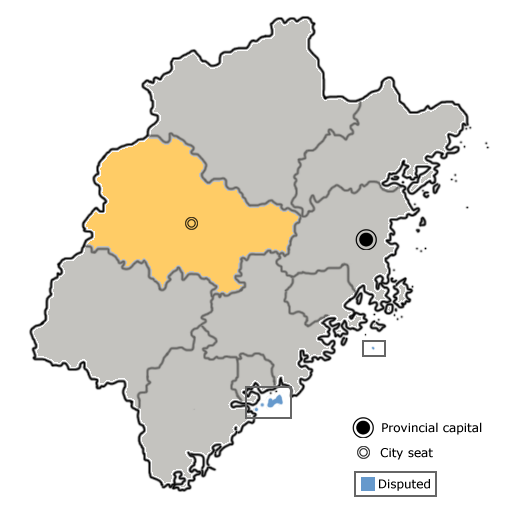
- Sanming in Fujian
- Coordinates: 26°10′12″N 118°11′24″E
- Country: People's Republic of China
- Province: Fujian
- Prefecture-level city: Sanming

Area
  - Total: 3,425 km^{2} (1,322 sq mi)

Population
  - Total: 352,067
  - Density: 102.8/km^{2} (266.2/sq mi)
- Time zone: UTC+8 (China Standard)

Youxi (Chinese: 尤溪; pinyin: Yóuxī) is a county of central Fujian province, People's Republic of China. It is under the administration of Sanming City.

== Transportation ==
- Xiangtang–Putian Railway

== Climate ==
Climate data for Youxi, elevation 205 m (673 ft), (1991–2020 normals, extremes 1981–2010)
Month	Jan	Feb	Mar	Apr	May	Jun	Jul	Aug	Sep	Oct	Nov	Dec	Year
Record high °C (°F)	28.9 (84.0)	35.3 (95.5)	34.0 (93.2)	36.3 (97.3)	38.4 (101.1)	38.7 (101.7)	42.4 (108.3)	40.6 (105.1)	38.9 (102.0)	35.5 (95.9)	35.2 (95.4)	30.8 (87.4)	42.4 (108.3)
Mean daily maximum °C (°F)	15.8 (60.4)	17.9 (64.2)	20.9 (69.6)	25.8 (78.4)	29.2 (84.6)	32.0 (89.6)	35.1 (95.2)	34.4 (93.9)	31.5 (88.7)	27.3 (81.1)	22.5 (72.5)	17.4 (63.3)	25.8 (78.5)
Daily mean °C (°F)	10.1 (50.2)	11.9 (53.4)	14.9 (58.8)	19.5 (67.1)	23.1 (73.6)	26.0 (78.8)	28.1 (82.6)	27.6 (81.7)	25.2 (77.4)	20.6 (69.1)	16.1 (61.0)	11.3 (52.3)	19.5 (67.2)
Mean daily minimum °C (°F)	6.7 (44.1)	8.3 (46.9)	11.2 (52.2)	15.5 (59.9)	19.3 (66.7)	22.3 (72.1)	23.5 (74.3)	23.5 (74.3)	21.4 (70.5)	16.6 (61.9)	12.4 (54.3)	7.6 (45.7)	15.7 (60.2)
Record low °C (°F)	−5.3 (22.5)	−4.0 (24.8)	−2.2 (28.0)	5.1 (41.2)	8.3 (46.9)	14.4 (57.9)	19.4 (66.9)	20.9 (69.6)	13.3 (55.9)	6.6 (43.9)	−1.0 (30.2)	−7.8 (18.0)	−7.8 (18.0)
Average precipitation mm (inches)	64.3 (2.53)	95.7 (3.77)	161.3 (6.35)	178.7 (7.04)	262.4 (10.33)	270.0 (10.63)	130.5 (5.14)	178.2 (7.02)	98.8 (3.89)	47.7 (1.88)	62.0 (2.44)	49.2 (1.94)	1,598.8 (62.96)
Average precipitation days (≥ 0.1 mm)	10.9	13.1	17.8	17.3	19.1	18.1	12.9	16.4	11.2	8.1	8.7	9.8	163.4
Average snowy days	0.2	0.1	0	0	0	0	0	0	0	0	0	0.1	0.4
Average relative humidity (%)	82	82	82	81	82	83	78	80	81	81	83	82	81
Mean monthly sunshine hours	89.5	85.9	92.8	111.7	123.2	133.9	216.2	194.1	158.1	147.1	112.4	103.1	1,568
Percentage possible sunshine	27	27	25	29	30	33	52	48	43	41	35	32	35
Source: China Meteorological Administration

== Administrative divisions ==
Towns:

- Chengguan (城关镇), Youxikou (尤溪口镇), Meixian (梅仙镇), Xibin (西滨镇), Xinyang (新阳镇), Yangzhong (洋中镇), Guanqian (管前镇), Xicheng (西城镇), Banmian (坂面镇)

Townships:

- Lianhe Township (联合乡), Tangchuan Township (汤川乡), Xiwei Township (溪尾乡), Zhongxian Township (中仙乡), Taixi Township (台溪乡), Baziqiao Township (八字桥乡)
