= Yong'an =

Yong'an 永安市 Yungan
- County-level city
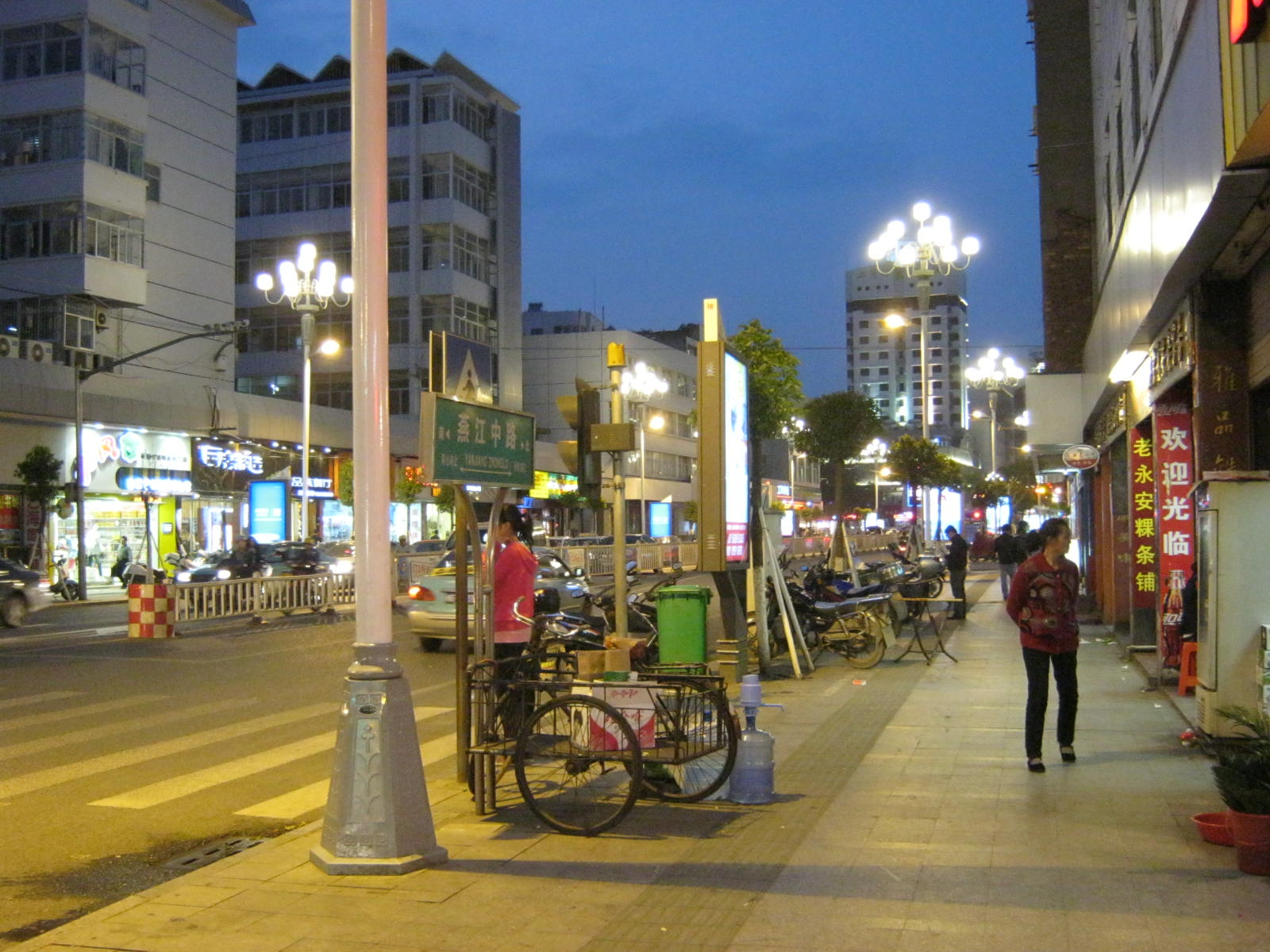
- Yan Jiang Zhong street

- Location in Fujian
- Coordinates (Yong'an government): 25°56′31″N 117°21′54″E
- Country: People's Republic of China
- Province: Fujian
- Prefecture-level city: Sanming
- Time zone: UTC+8 (China Standard)
- Local variety: Central Min (Yong'an dialect)

Yong'an (Chinese: 永安; pinyin: Yǒng'ān; Wade–Giles: Yung-an) is a county-level city in west-central Fujian province, People's Republic of China. It is located on the Sha River, which is a tributary of the Min River. Formerly a county, Yong'an became a county-level city on September 12, 1984.

Yong'an is located in the west-central part of the prefecture-level city of Sanming, approximately 290 km (180 miles) west of Fuzhou, the provincial capital. The city's population is 319,000 (2003–2004). The natural population growth rate is 5.87%. The city was the capital of the Fujian Provincial Government during the Second Sino-Japanese War from 1938 to 1945.

Yong'an is known for:

1. Its rich natural resources (hence the saying "gold mountain silver water"). The forest coverage is more than 85%, which is a miracle percentage in coastal southern-east of China.
2. A relatively strong industrial base. Yong'an is a rising industrial city in Fujian Province and an important energy and raw materials' production base.
3. A relatively complete infrastructure located in the northwest of Fujian Minnan. It is an important transport hub and a distribution center.
4. A relatively high level of urbanization, actively creating better urban residences.

== Climate ==
Yong'an, similar to the rest of the province, has a humid subtropical climate (Köppen Cfa), with short and mild winters, and long, very hot and humid summers. The monthly 24-hour average temperature ranges from 9.7 °C (49.5 °F) in January to 28.2 °C (82.8 °F) in July, and the annual mean is 19.36 °C (66.8 °F). Rainfall averages more than 190 mm (7.5 in) per month from March to June before gradually tapering off until early winter. With monthly percent possible sunshine ranging from 23% in March to 55% in July, the city receives 1,629 hours of bright sunshine annually, with summer being the sunniest time of the year; spring and late winter are especially overcast and damp.

Climate data for Yong'an, elevation 258 m (846 ft), (1991–2020 normals, extremes 1951–present)
Month	Jan	Feb	Mar	Apr	May	Jun	Jul	Aug	Sep	Oct	Nov	Dec	Year
Record high °C (°F)	30.4 (86.7)	33.7 (92.7)	34.5 (94.1)	36.0 (96.8)	37.8 (100.0)	38.3 (100.9)	41.2 (106.2)	40.4 (104.7)	38.9 (102.0)	39.1 (102.4)	34.9 (94.8)	31.4 (88.5)	41.2 (106.2)
Mean daily maximum °C (°F)	15.6 (60.1)	17.9 (64.2)	20.9 (69.6)	26.0 (78.8)	29.2 (84.6)	31.7 (89.1)	34.6 (94.3)	34.0 (93.2)	31.3 (88.3)	27.3 (81.1)	22.3 (72.1)	17.0 (62.6)	25.1 (77.2)
Daily mean °C (°F)	10.3 (50.5)	12.5 (54.5)	15.5 (59.9)	20.4 (68.7)	23.9 (75.0)	26.6 (79.9)	28.6 (83.5)	28.0 (82.4)	25.8 (78.4)	21.4 (70.5)	16.6 (61.9)	11.4 (52.5)	20.1 (68.1)
Mean daily minimum °C (°F)	7.0 (44.6)	9.0 (48.2)	12.0 (53.6)	16.5 (61.7)	20.2 (68.4)	23.1 (73.6)	24.4 (75.9)	24.1 (75.4)	22.1 (71.8)	17.5 (63.5)	12.9 (55.2)	7.9 (46.2)	15.5 (60.0)
Record low °C (°F)	−7.6 (18.3)	−4.7 (23.5)	−2.3 (27.9)	2.8 (37.0)	8.6 (47.5)	12.7 (54.9)	19.2 (66.6)	16.7 (62.1)	9.4 (48.9)	2.4 (36.3)	−2.5 (27.5)	−6.0 (21.2)	−7.6 (18.3)
Average precipitation mm (inches)	65.4 (2.57)	96.9 (3.81)	168.6 (6.64)	185.7 (7.31)	252.1 (9.93)	239.8 (9.44)	131.0 (5.16)	167.0 (6.57)	91.7 (3.61)	41.7 (1.64)	58.7 (2.31)	51.1 (2.01)	1,549.7 (61)
Average snowy days	0.3	0.2	0	0	0	0	0	0	0	0	0	0.2	0.7
Average relative humidity (%)	78	79	79	77	78	78	73	76	76	75	78	79	77
Mean monthly sunshine hours	93.1	90.6	90.1	113.0	126.7	139.0	223.0	199.2	164.9	156.5	122.1	107.2	1,625.4
Percentage possible sunshine	28	28	24	29	30	34	53	50	45	44	38	33	36
Source: China Meteorological Administration extremes

== Administrative divisions ==
Subdistricts:

- Yandong Subdistrict (燕东街道), Yanxi Subdistrict (燕西街道), Yannan Subdistrict (燕南街道), Yanbei Subdistrict (燕北街道)

Towns:

- Xiyang (西洋镇), Gongchuan (贡川镇), Ansha (安砂镇), Xiaotao (小陶镇), Dahu (大湖镇), Caoyuan (曹远镇), Hongtian (洪田镇)

Townships:

- Huainan Township (槐南乡), Shangping Township (上坪乡), Luofang Township (罗坊乡), Qingshui She Ethnic Township (青水畲族乡)
