= Sanming =

Sanming 三明市
- Prefecture-level city
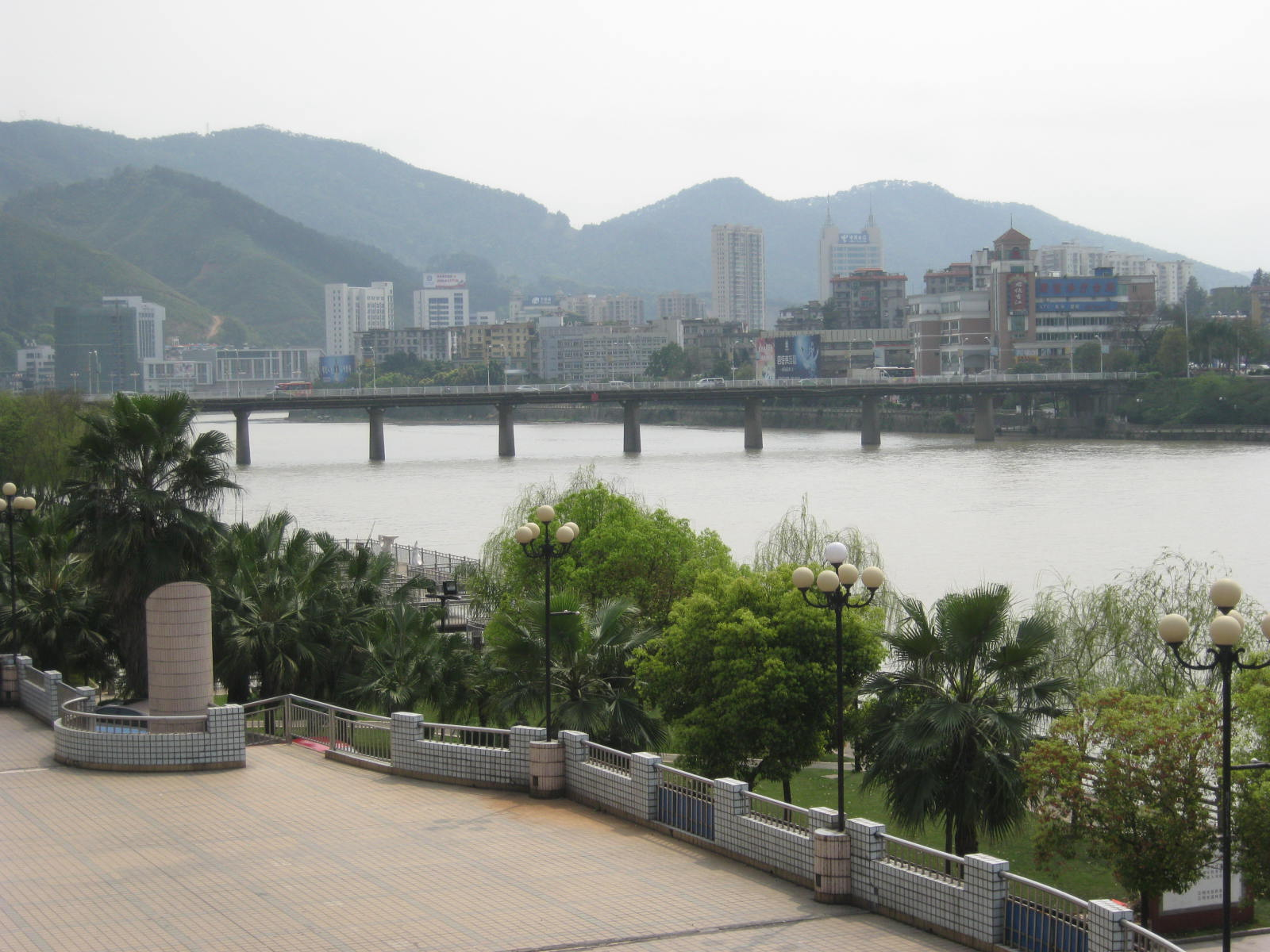
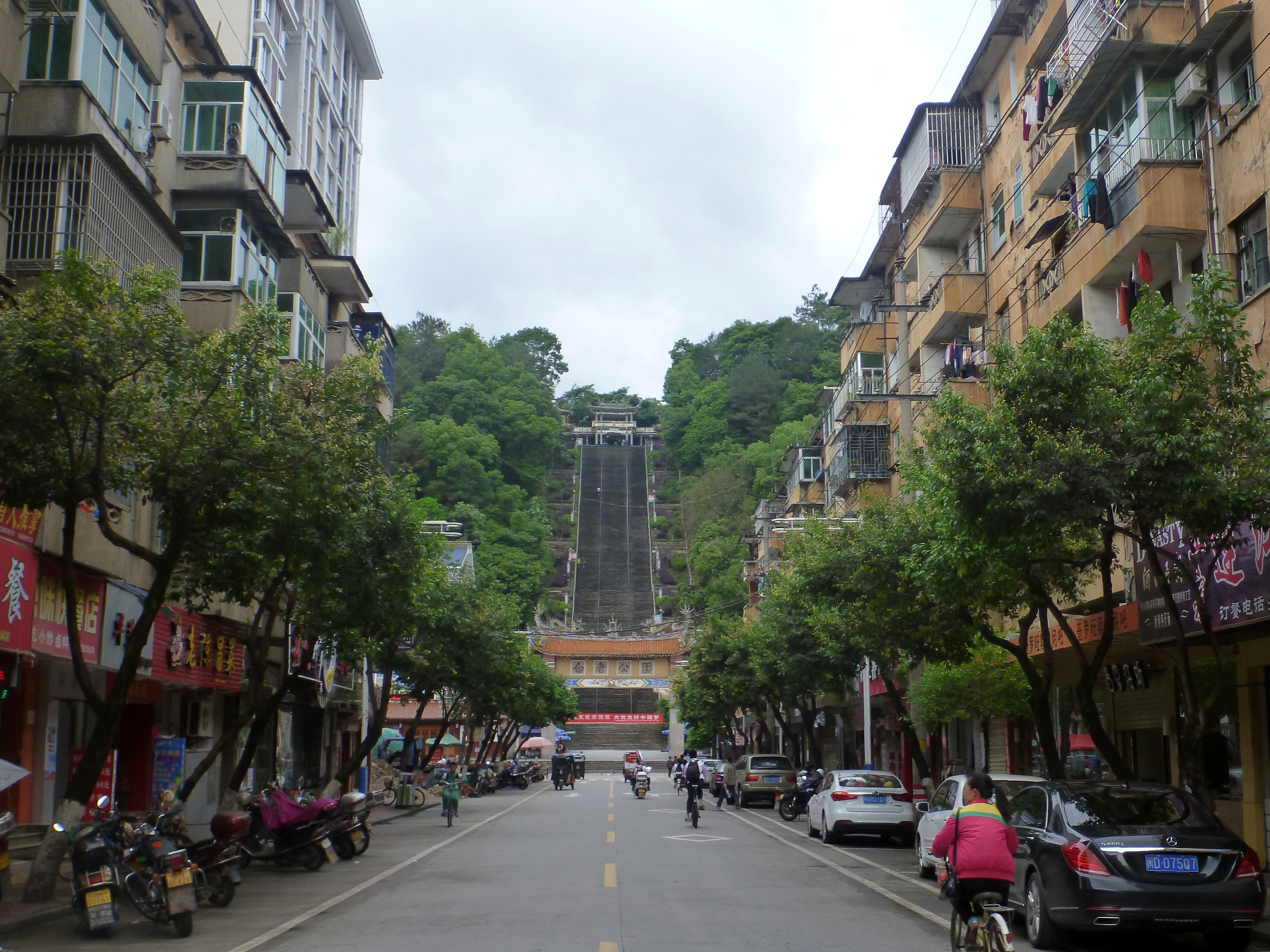
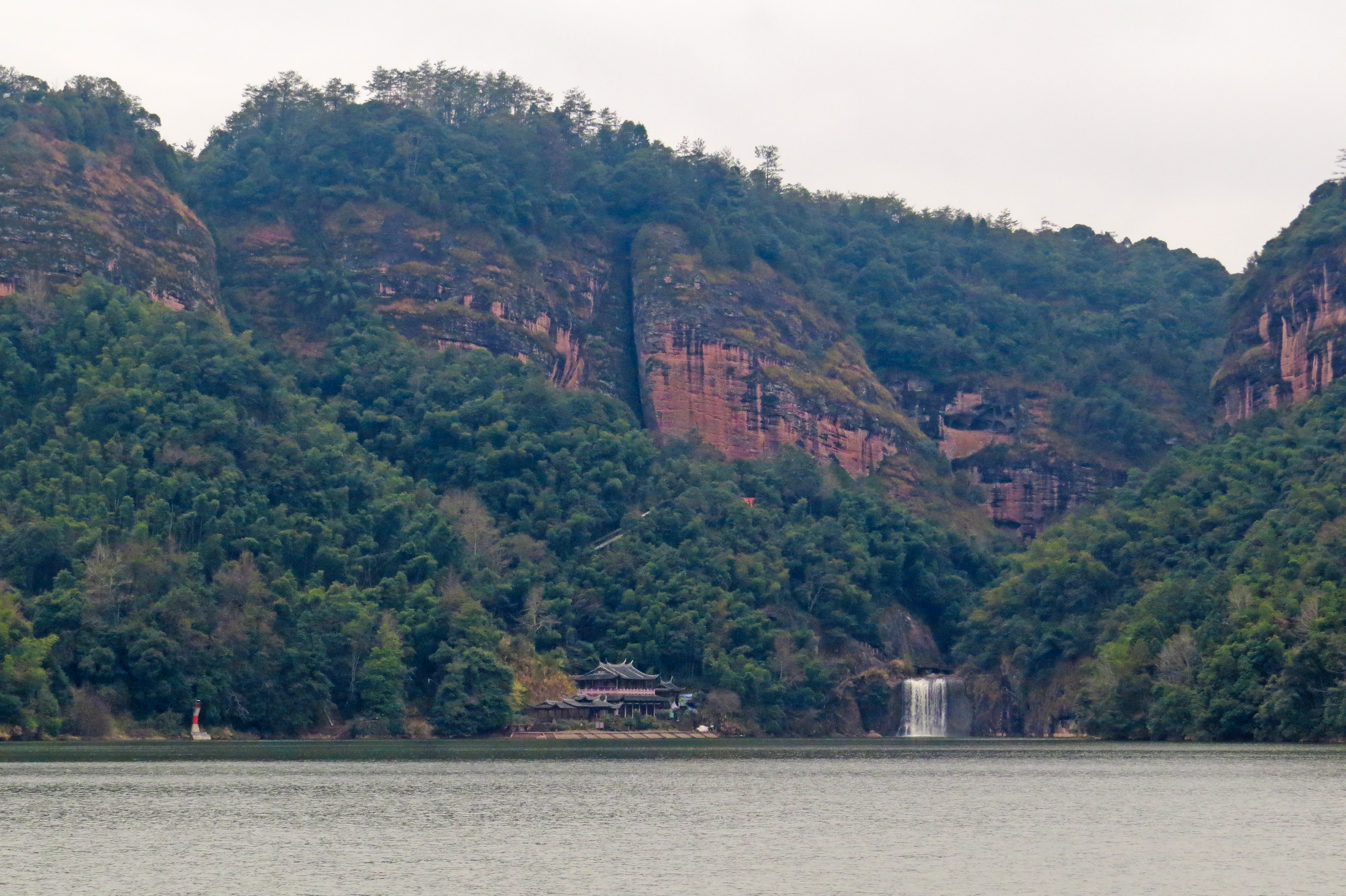
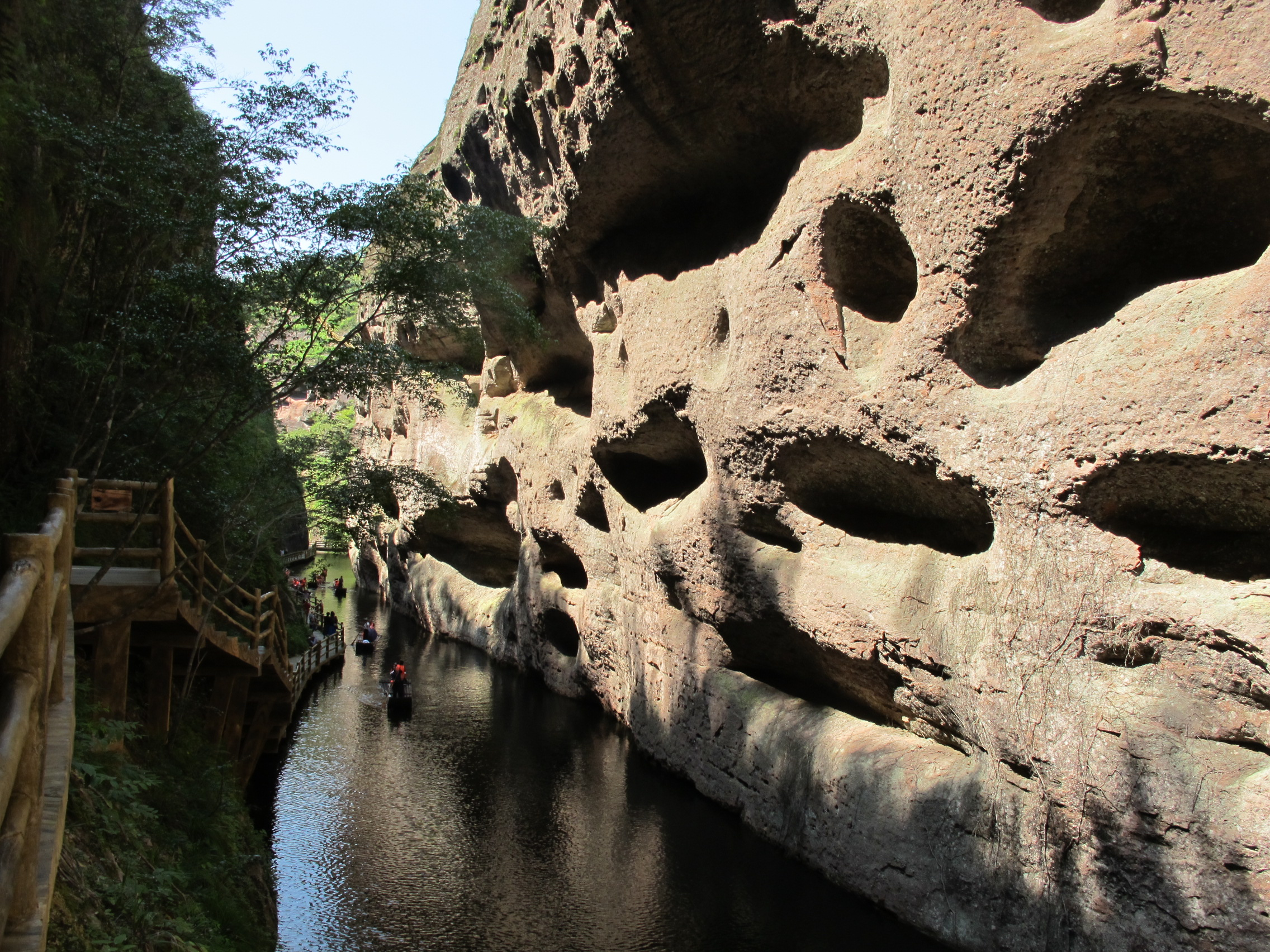
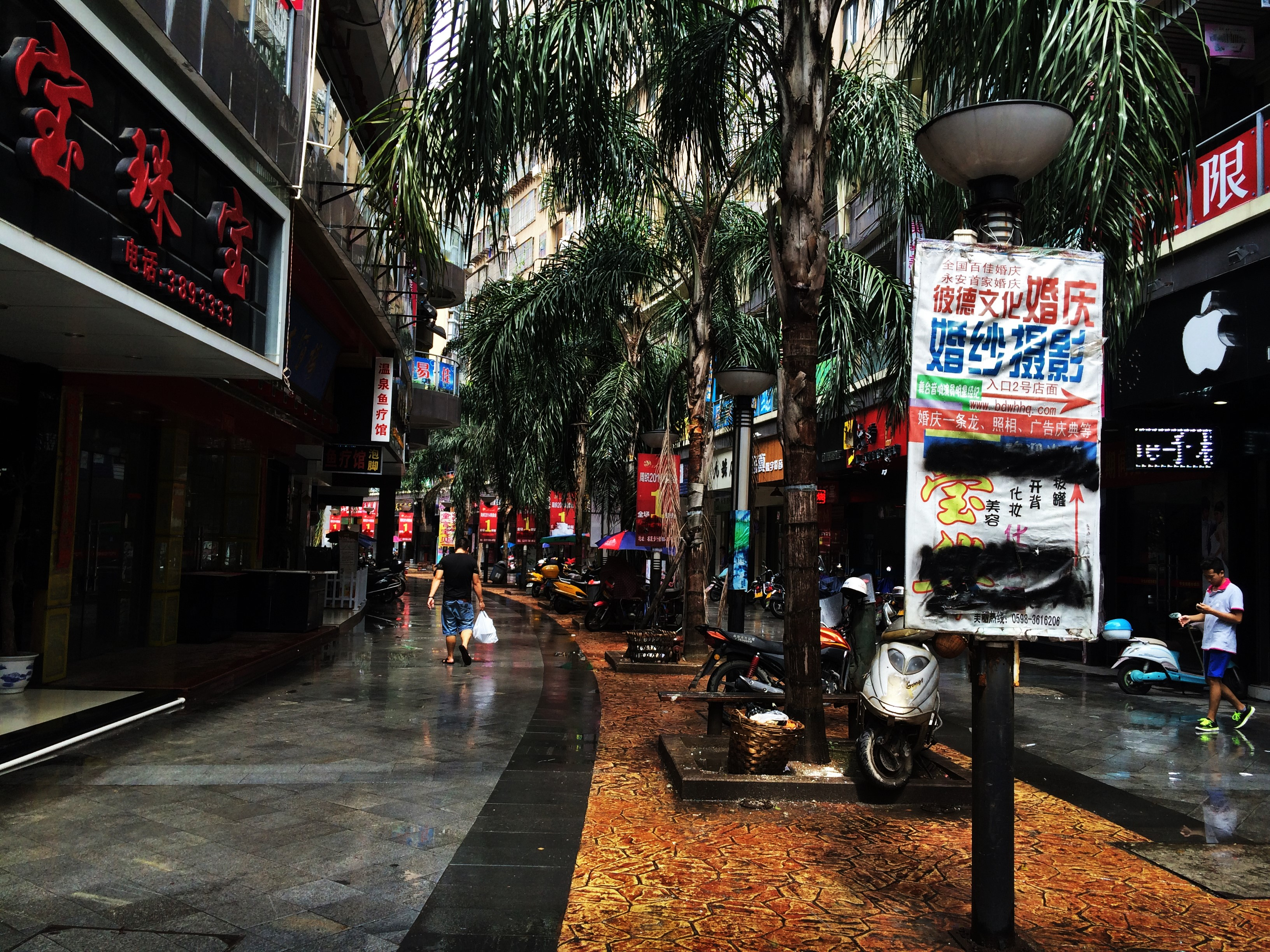
- Clockwise from top: Liedong Bridge (列东大桥) over Sha River (沙溪), Taining Golden Lake, street scene in Yong'an, more Danxia Landform in Taining County, and Baiyan Park in Datian County.

- Location of Sanming City in Fujian

- Location in China
- Coordinates (Sanming municipal government): 26°15′48″N 117°38′20″E
- Country: People's Republic of China
- Province: Fujian
- Municipal seat: Sanyuan District

Area
  - Prefecture-level city: 22,929 km^{2} (8,853 sq mi)

Population (2020 Census)
  - Prefecture-level city: 2,486,450
  - Density: 108.44/km^{2} (280.86/sq mi)
  - Urban: 1,571,500

GDP
  - Prefecture-level city: CN¥ 270 billion US$ 39.2 billion
  - Per capita: CN¥ 108,304; US$ 17,004
- Time zone: UTC+8 (CST)
- Postal code: 365000
- Area code: 598
- ISO 3166 code: CN-FJ-04
- License Plate: 闽G
- Local variety: Central Min (Sanming dialect)
- Website: www.sm.gov.cn

Sanming (Chinese: 三明; pinyin: Sānmíng), also known as Minzhong (simplified Chinese: 闽中; traditional Chinese: 閩中), is a prefecture-level city in western Fujian province, China. It borders Nanping City to the north, Fuzhou City to the east, Quanzhou City to the southeast, Longyan City to the south and the province of Jiangxi to the west. Sanming lies between Wuyi and Daiyun mountains.

== Geography and climate ==
The prefecture level city of Sanming has a total area of 22,965 km^{2} (8,867 sq mi), of which 82 percent of this extension is composed of mountainous areas, 8.3 percent of arable land and 9.7 percent of water or other type of terrain.

Sainming is known for its natural landscapes, including the Danxia Landform and Karst topography. Some notable spots include global geopark Taining Golden Lake in Taining County, Yuhua Cave in Jiangle County and Goose Cave in Ninghua County.

Climate data for Sanming, elevation 208 m (682 ft), (1991–2020 normals, extremes 1981–present)
Month	Jan	Feb	Mar	Apr	May	Jun	Jul	Aug	Sep	Oct	Nov	Dec	Year
Record high °C (°F)	28.5 (83.3)	34.4 (93.9)	35.1 (95.2)	35.5 (95.9)	37.0 (98.6)	37.9 (100.2)	41.4 (106.5)	41.0 (105.8)	38.6 (101.5)	35.8 (96.4)	34.1 (93.4)	29.1 (84.4)	41.4 (106.5)
Mean daily maximum °C (°F)	15.2 (59.4)	17.5 (63.5)	20.5 (68.9)	25.6 (78.1)	28.9 (84.0)	31.5 (88.7)	34.6 (94.3)	34.0 (93.2)	31.2 (88.2)	26.9 (80.4)	22.0 (71.6)	16.7 (62.1)	25.4 (77.7)
Daily mean °C (°F)	10.3 (50.5)	12.3 (54.1)	15.2 (59.4)	20.0 (68.0)	23.5 (74.3)	26.3 (79.3)	28.5 (83.3)	28.0 (82.4)	25.7 (78.3)	21.4 (70.5)	16.6 (61.9)	11.5 (52.7)	19.9 (67.9)
Mean daily minimum °C (°F)	7.1 (44.8)	8.8 (47.8)	11.7 (53.1)	16.1 (61.0)	19.9 (67.8)	22.8 (73.0)	24.3 (75.7)	24.1 (75.4)	22.0 (71.6)	17.5 (63.5)	13.0 (55.4)	8.1 (46.6)	16.3 (61.3)
Record low °C (°F)	−3.8 (25.2)	−2.5 (27.5)	−1.8 (28.8)	4.2 (39.6)	9.6 (49.3)	14.0 (57.2)	20.0 (68.0)	18.6 (65.5)	13.1 (55.6)	6.0 (42.8)	0.4 (32.7)	−5.8 (21.6)	−5.8 (21.6)
Average precipitation mm (inches)	69.4 (2.73)	106.6 (4.20)	185.9 (7.32)	192.0 (7.56)	264.6 (10.42)	272.2 (10.72)	147.9 (5.82)	181.7 (7.15)	98.2 (3.87)	50.4 (1.98)	63.9 (2.52)	53.0 (2.09)	1,685.8 (66.38)
Average precipitation days (≥ 0.1 mm)	11.5	13.5	17.6	16.9	18.6	17.5	13.3	15.5	10.8	7.6	7.8	8.9	159.5
Average snowy days	0.3	0.2	0	0	0	0	0	0	0	0	0	0.2	0.7
Average relative humidity (%)	77	77	79	78	79	80	74	76	76	73	76	76	77
Mean monthly sunshine hours	91.8	87.1	86.7	107.4	120.5	130.5	212.6	190.7	161.0	157.5	121.9	112.6	1,580.3
Percentage possible sunshine	28	27	23	28	29	32	51	48	44	44	38	35	36
Source: China Meteorological Administration

== Demographics ==
According to the 2010 Census, Sanming has a population of 2,503,338, 70,687 inhabitants less than in 2000 Census (the average annual population growth for the period 2000-2010 was of -0.28%). The emigration of population from Sanming to other areas of Fujian is a constant process, even encouraged by government politics since the 1960s.

== Administration ==
The prefecture-level city of Sanming administers 2 districts, 1 county-level city, and 8 counties. The information here presented is in km^{2} and using data from 2010 Census.

Map
Name	Chinese	Pinyin	Foochow	Area	Population	Density
Sanyuan District	三元区	Sānyuán Qū	Săng-nguòng-kṳ̆	1156	375,497	324
Shaxian District	沙县区	Shāxiàn Qū	Să-gâing-kṳ̆	1,815	226,669	125
Yong'an City	永安市	Yǒng'ān Shì	Īng-ăng-chê	2,941	347,042	118
Mingxi County	明溪县	Míngxī Xiàn	Mìng-kă̤-gâing	1,704	102,667	60
Qingliu County	清流县	Qīngliú Xiàn	Chĭng-liù-gâing	1,825	136,248	75
Ninghua County	宁化县	Nínghuà Xiàn	Nìng-huá-gâing	2,381	272,443	114
Datian County	大田县	Dàtián Xiàn	Duâi-dièng-gâing	2,294	311,631	136
Youxi County	尤溪县	Yóuxī Xiàn	Iù-kă̤-gâing	3,425	352,067	103
Jiangle County	将乐县	Jiānglè Xiàn	Ciŏng-lŏk-gâing	2,247	148,867	66
Taining County	泰宁县	Tàiníng Xiàn	Tái-nìng-gâing	1,534	110,278	72
Jianning County	建宁县	Jiànníng Xiàn	Gióng-nìng-gâing	1,742	119,979	69

== History ==
In 1940 Sanyuan County was established. In 1956, Mingxi and Sanyuan Counties were combined to Sanming County, then in 1960 it was replaced with Sanming city.

== Environment and tourism ==
Sanming has four well preserved and protected National Parks. The city was labeled as the most "green" city of the most "green" province in China.

Da Jin Hu, which is the most famous tourist spot in Sanming, is also well known as Taining Gorden Lake Geopark marked by UNESCO. The Geopark is famous for its unique Danxia Landform. The lake situated inside Taining County at the south end of Wuyi Mountain is the major State-level place of scenic beauty with the length of 60-plus kilometres and water area of more than 50 thousand mu. The best tour season of Taining Jinhu Lake is from April to October each year.

There are some places of historic interest and scenic beauty which include the State-level Taining Jinhu Lake, Yong-an Taoyuan Cave, Linying Stone Forest, and the provincial level Jiangle Yuhua Cave, Sha Xian Qixian Cave, Ninghua Tian-er Cave and Meilie Ruiyun Mountain in Sanming. The natural reserves in Jiangle Longxi mountain, Xingkou Geshikao, Shaxian Nanmu Forest and Yong-an Tianbao Rock are well known for rare animals. The ancient architectural structure in Taining, Shibi Village, the originating place of the Hakkas in Ninghua and the birthplace of Zhu Xi in Youxi have all been noticeable both in China and overseas.

Yong-an Taoyuan Cave, situated by Yan River on the north of Yong-an City, is a major State-level place of scenic beauty with an area of 10 kilometres.

Linying Stone Forest, a marvellous spectacle located in Dahu Village 13 kilometres (8.1 mi) northwest of Yong-an City, is a State-level major place of scenic beauty with a total area of 1.21 square kilometres (0.47 sq mi).

The architectural structure group built in the ancient Ming Dynasty situated at the center of the urban district of Taining County is a State-level cultural relics under protection, having a high value in studying the ancient Chinese architecture, especially that in the Ming Dynasty.

The city is served by Sanming Shaxian Airport.

Sanming University is the sole university in Sanming.

== Cuisine ==
Local food style in Sanming City normally includes various snacks especially the famous Sha County Snacks. Sha County snack is one of well-known snack styles in China, which can be found in hundreds of cities around mainland China.

Sha County snacks have a long history and are known to be living artifacts of the Han people's food culture.

Currently, 39 varieties of Sha County snacks have been labeled as "Famous Chinese Snacks" and 63 kinds as "Famous Fujian Snacks." The China Cuisine Association awarded Sha County the title of "Snack Culture City" in China on December 8, 2006.

The production process of Sha County snacks was listed in Fujian intangible cultural heritage in 2007, and has been declared a national intangible cultural heritage. Representing Fujian, Sha County snacks are also available on the Chinese Food Street at the Shanghai 2010 World Expo.

Besides Sha County snacks, Yong'an snacks and Ninghua County snacks attract local people a lot as well.

== Twin towns – sister cities ==
- Lansing, United States

== See also ==
- CNS Sanming (524), Chinese navy frigate named after the city
