= Chawan dialect =

Variety of Southern Min spoken in Fujian

- 詔安話 (Chiàu-an-ōɛ)
- Native to: China
- Region: Southern part of the Zhao'an County
- Native speakers: 270,000 (2021)
- Language family: Sino-Tibetan: Sinitic; Chinese; Min; Coastal Min; Southern Min; Hokkien; Chawan dialect
- Early forms: Proto-Sino-Tibetan: Old Chinese (Note: Min is believed to have split from Old Chinese, rather than Middle Chinese like other varieties of Chinese.); Proto-Min
- Writing system: Han characters

Language codes
- ISO 639-3: –

Chawan dialect (simplified Chinese: 诏安话; traditional Chinese: 詔安話; Pe̍h-ōe-jī: Chiàu-an-ōɛ) is a variety of Southern Min spoken in the Chawan (Zhao'an) County in Fujian province, China. It is usually considered a divergent dialect of Hokkien exhibiting some Teochew influence.

== Geography and classification ==
Chawan dialect is spoken in the southern half of the Chawan (Zhao'an) county. The northern part of the county, with roughly one-third of its population, is mainly Hakka-speaking, and the border between the Chawan-speaking and the Hakka-speaking parts of county lies within the Hongxing township (红星乡) and Taiping town (太平镇).

The dialect spoken in Sidu (四都镇), Meizhou (梅洲乡) and Jinxing (金星乡), three localities in the eastern part of the Chawan county, is closer to the Yunxiao Hokkien. The Yunxiao dialect bears some affinity to Chawan, however, it lacks some of its notable characteristicts, such as vowels /ɯ/ and /ə/.

A related dialect is spoken in some parts of the Dongshan island, particularly the Qianlou town (前楼镇).

The speech of the Nanzhao town is taken as representative for Chawan dialect. There are some internal differences, but the subdialects of Chawan are yet poorly described. E.g.:

- The dialect of the Tingyang village (汀洋村) in Baiyang Township (白洋乡), almost at the Fujian-Guangdong border, shows some Teochew specific traits, such as lack of denasalization and the merger of /in, an/ with /iŋ, aŋ/ (e.g. it distinguishes 目 ma̍k and 木 ba̍k, while general Chawan has both as ba̍k; it distinguishes initials, but not finals in 儂 nâng and 蘭 lâng, while general Chawan has 儂 lâng and 蘭 lân).
- The dialect of the Wenshan village (文山村) in the Taiping Town (太平镇) has the rime /oi/ in words like 尾 bói, unlike general Chawan bóe. It also has the rime /-uou/ instead of /-ou/ (e.g. it reads 土 thó͘ as [tʰuou³⁵], unlike general Chawan [tʰou⁵³]), which is a trait found in some Hokkien dialects around Zhangpu.

Chawan is usually classified as a dialect of Hokkien. However, it also shares some traits with Teochew, particularly in its vocabulary, e.g.:

- 睇 théiⁿ "to see" (cf. Teochew 睇 thóiⁿ, Hokkien 看 khòaⁿ)
- 呾話 tàⁿ-ōɛ "to talk" (cf. Teochew 呾話 tàⁿ-ōe, Hokkien 講話 kóng-ōa)
- 女 nńg "woman" (cf. Teochew 女 nṳ́ng, Hokkien 女 lí)

== Phonology ==
=== Consonants ===
In terms of consonants, Chawan does not differ much from other dialects of Hokkien. It has as total of 15 initials. Denasalization is extensive, which is typical for Hokkien, but not for Teochew.

=== Rimes ===
The most notable feature of Chawan is the presence of the vowels /ɯ/ and /ə/, which are absent in the general Zhangzhou dialects.

feature	Zhangzhou Hokkien					Quanzhou Hokkien		Teochew
feature	Chawan	Qianlou (Dongshan)	Yunxiao, rural Dongshan	Zhangpu	Zhangzhou	Amoy	Quanzhou	Raoping
rime in 豬	ɯ	u	i	i	i	u	ɯ	ə
rime in 胎	ə	ə	e	ɛ	e	e	ə	o
rime in 地	ei	ei	ei	iei	e	e	e	i
rime in 茶	ɛ	ɛ	ɛ	ɛ	ɛ	e	e	e

Chawan is also notable for distinguishing /ue/ and /uɛ/. While the former rime is common across Hokkien dialects, the latter is usually merged with /ue/ (in Quanzhou Hokkien) or /ua/ (in Zhanghzou Hokkien). To a lesser extent, Yunxiao Hokkien also distinguishes /ue/ and /uɛ/.

feature	Zhangzhou Hokkien				Quanzhou Hokkien		Teochew
feature	Chawan	Yunxiao	Zhangpu	Zhangzhou	Amoy	Quanzhou	Raoping
rime in 破, 沙	ua	ua	ua	ua	ua	ua	ua
rime in 花, 瓜	uɛ	uɛ	uɛ	ua	ue	ue	ue
rime in 灰, 果	ue	ue	uɛ	ue	e	ə	ue
rime in 活, 熱	uaʔ	uaʔ	uaʔ	uaʔ	uaʔ	uaʔ	uaʔ
rime in 劃	uɛʔ	uɛʔ	uɛʔ	uaʔ	uiʔ	ueʔ	ueʔ
rime in 說, 月	ueʔ	ueʔ	uɛʔ	ueʔ	eʔ	əʔ	ueʔ
rime in 山, 單	uã	uã	uã	uã	uã	uã	uã
rime in 關, 橫	uɛ̃	uẽ	uɛ̃	uã	uãi	uĩ	uẽ
rime in 糜, 妹	uẽ	ɛ̃	uɛ̃	ãi	e	ə	uẽ

Chawan dialect does not dissimilate the rimes /uam/ and /uap/ (in 凡 hoâm, 犯 hoām, 法 hoap), similarly to Teochew. Most other Hokkien dialects have /uan/ and /uat/ instead.

=== Tones ===
Chawan has 7 citation tones, which are mostly similar to general Zhangzhou Hokkien tones.

	citation tones				post-sandhi tones				
	平 level	上 rising	去 departing	入 entering	平 level	上 rising	去 departing	入 entering	
	平 level	上 rising	去 departing	入 entering	平 level	上 rising	去 departing	-ʔ	-p, -t, -k
陰 dark	55	53	21	3	33	35	53		5
陽 light	13	33		13	21	31			3
