= Hokkien phonology =

Phonology of the Hokkien language

Hokkien is a Southern Min language spoken in southern Fujian and Taiwan. It has one of the most diverse phoneme inventories among Sinitic languages.

Along with other Min languages, which are not directly descended from Middle Chinese, Hokkien is of considerable interest to historical linguists for reconstructing Old Chinese.

This article uses Pe̍h-ōe-jī and IPA for transcription.

== Syllables ==
A syllable in Hokkien consists of an initial, a final, and a tone.

In total, Hokkien uses around 800 toneless combinations of initials and finals, and around 2250~2450 total syllables with tones (counting only attested meaningful syllables, not all theoretically possible combinations).

The number of syllables in Hokkien is far greater than in any other Sinitic language. For comparison, Cantonese and Hokchew use around 1800 toned syllables, Beijing Mandarin has 1350 syllables, and Suzhou Wu has only 1100 syllables.

== Initials ==
Hokkien has aspirated, unaspirated as well as voiced consonant initials.

A total of 15 initials (or 14, in dialects with /dz/ merged with /l/) are used in Hokkien. This number does not include the three nasal consonants ([m], [n], [ŋ]), which are usually considered allophones of the non-nasal voiced initials (e.g. 命; miā; 'life' is analyzed as /bĩã^{⊇}/, but pronounced as [mĩã²²]). This allophony also leads to a notable feature of the Hokkien accent in other languages, such as Japanese or Mandarin, when the nasal sounds like [m] are denasalized into non-nasal voiced consonants like [b].

		Labial	Alveolar	Palatal	Velar	Glottal
Stop	plain	p	t		k	ʔ
Stop	aspirated	pʰ	tʰ		kʰ	
Stop	voiced	b (m)	l~d~ɾ (n)		ɡ (ŋ)	
Stop	(nasalized)	b (m)	l~d~ɾ (n)		ɡ (ŋ)	
Affricate	plain		ts			
Affricate	aspirated		tsʰ			
Affricate	voiced		dz~z			
Fricative			s			h
Semi-vowels		w		j		

Syllables starting with vowels or approximants (/w/, /j/) are considered to have the zero initial /∅/ (which can be articulated as a glottal stop [ʔ]).

Affricates and fricatives (ts, tsʰ, dz~z, s) are palatalized before i, becoming tɕ, tɕʰ, dʑ~ʑ, ɕ.

Allophones of the consonants in urban Zhangzhou Hokkien
Phoneme	Phonetic realisation			
Phoneme	_/[i; j]	_/[u; w]	_/[Ṽ; ŋ̍]	elsewhere
/p/	[p]	[pʷ]	[p]	[p]
/pʰ/	[pʰ]	[pʰʷ]	[pʰ]	[pʰ]
/b/	[ɓ]	[βʷ]	[m]	[ɓ]
/t/	[t̪]	[t̻ʷ]	[t]	[t]
/tʰ/	[t̪ʰ]	[t̻ʰʷ]	[tʰ]	[tʰ]
/l/	[ɗ̪]	[lʷ]	[n]	[ɗ]
/k/	[kʲ]	[kʷ]	[k]	[k]
/kʰ/	[kʰʲ]	[kʰʷ]	[kʰ]	[kʰ]
/g/	[ɠʲ]	[ɣʷ]	[ŋ]	[ɠ]
/∅/	[ʔʲ]/∅	[ʔʷ]/∅	[ʔ]/∅	[ʔ]/∅
/s/	[ɕ]	[ʃ]	[s]	[s]
/z/	[ʝ]	[ʒ]	[z]	[z]
/h/	[ħʲ]	[hʷ]	[ɦ]	[ħ]
/ts/	[tɕ]	[tʃ]	[ts]	[ts]
/tsʰ/	[tɕʰ]	[tʃʰ]	[tsʰ]	[tsʰ]

The phoneme /l/ in Hokkien has many possible articulations. It ranges between [d], [ɗ], [l] and [ɾ]. Its nasal allophone is uniformly described as [n]. In directly borrowed loanwords (i.e. those not borrowed orthographically via Mandarin or Japanese), foreign /d/ may be represented with Hokkien /l/: 鐳; lui; 'coin' (from Dutch duit via Malay), 羅辛; lô-sin; 'dozen' (from English), 老君; ló-kun; 'doctor' (from Malay dukun), 棉蘭; Mî-lân; 'Medan'.

As a phoneme, /dz/ (also realized as [z]) is found predominantly in southern dialects of Hokkien. In many northern dialects, such as urban Quanzhou and Amoy, it has merged with /l/. This merger is still incomplete in some peripheral northern dialects, such as those of Tong'an or Yongchun, where /dz/ is reported to be present in some localities, in the speech of older speakers, or in a limited set of words (usually the more common ones, such as 日; ji̍t; 'day' or 二; jī; 'two'). Some Southern Hokkien and Lengna dialects merge /dz/ with /g/ (among the Southern Hokkien dialects, such merger is found in the north of Zhangpu, in Taichung, or, under the Lengna influence, in Hua'an).

While generally preserving /dz/, Zhangzhou Hokkien may still merge it with /l/ in some words, usually before /-u-/. E.g., characters like 潤 jūn 'wet', 軟 joán 'soft', 偌 jǒa 'how much' are now pronounced lūn, loán, lǒa even in Zhangzhou, although older Hokkien dictionaries record them with /dz/.

== Finals ==
A final in Hokkien consists of a nucleus (a vowel, a diphthong, or a syllabic nasal /m̩/ or /ŋ̍/), with an optional medial (/i/ or /u/, some dialects also allow /ɯ/) and coda (/m/, /n/, /ŋ/, /p/, /t/, /k/, /ʔ/).

There are around 80 to 90 finals in Hokkien. The exact number can vary depending on the specific dialect, as well as the inclusion of marginal finals from onomatopoeia and contractions. Lengna Min, which is sometimes included in Hokkien, has around 60 finals, due to the loss of the /-ʔ/ coda.

In the tables below, rare rimes used in a small number of words are shaded. Finals used only in the northern or southern dialects of Hokkien are marked with _{N} and _{S} respectively.

=== Open-vowel finals ===
Finals with the coda /-ʔ/ are considered to be the checked tone counterparts for the open-vowel finals.

Non-nasalized finals
non-entering tones	zero medial	-a /a/ 亞巴	-o̤ /ə/_{N} (Note: /ə/ is not found in Amoy Hokkien. In Pe̍h-ōe-jī, it may be written with -er, -ö, or -o̤.) 果皮	-o͘ /ɔ/ or /ou/ 土兔	-o /o/ 刀無	-e /e/ or /ei/ 系西	-ɛ /ɛ/_{S} (Note: /ɛ/ is not found in Amoy Hokkien. The original Pe̍h-ōe-jī by W.H.Medhurst used -ay for it. In later variations of Pe̍h-ōe-jī, it may be written with -ee, -e͘, -ɛ, or -a̤.) 茶馬	-ṳ /ɯ/_{N} (Note: /ɯ/ is not found in Amoy Hokkien. In Pe̍h-ōe-jī, it may be written with -ir, -ü, or -ṳ.) 去事		-ai /ai/ 才台	-au /au/ 包草
non-entering tones	/-i-/	-ia /ia/ 者野	-i /i/ 伊比		-io /io/ 叫小				-iu /iu/ 友首		-iau /iau/ 條肖
non-entering tones	/-u-/	-oa /ua/ 我歌	-u /u/ 主富			-oe /ue/ 悔貝			-ui /ui/ 水季	-oai /uai/ 快怪	
entering tones	zero medial	-ah /aʔ/ 甲拍	-o̤h /əʔ/_{N} 雪月	-o͘ h /ɔʔ/ 噁	-oh /oʔ/ 學索	-eh /eʔ/ 客_{N}雪_{S}	-ɛh /ɛʔ/_{S} 白客	-ṳh /ɯʔ/_{N} 䟙漬			-auh /auʔ/ 雹暴
entering tones	/-i-/	-iah /iaʔ/ 食壁	-ih /iʔ/ 鐵篾	-io͘ h /iɔʔ/_{S} (Note: /iɔʔ/ — only found in urban Zhangzhou dialect in the interjection 諾 io̍͘h "yeah; right".)	-ioh /ioʔ/ 箬藥				-iuh /iuʔ/ (Note: /iuʔ/ — used in onomatopoeia and ideophones, e.g. 搐搐彈 tiuh-tiuh-tōaⁿ "aching, painful", 密喌喌 ba̍t-chiuh-chiuh "very dense; thick".)		-iauh /iauʔ/ (Note: /iauʔ/ — used in onomatopoeia and ideophones, e.g. 靜悄悄 chēng-chiauh-chiauh "quiet; tranquil", 吱吱嚼嚼 chi-chi-chia̍uh-chia̍uh "(describes a rapid speech, chattering)", 硬碻碻 ngɛ̄-khia̍uh-khia̍uh "very hard, solid".)
entering tones	/-u-/	-oah /uaʔ/ 煞末	-uh /uʔ/ 厾托			-oeh /ueʔ/ 八_{N}卜_{S}			-uih /uiʔ/_{N} 血		

The vowel -a /a/ is usually [ɐ].

The vowel ɛ /ɛ/ is only found in Southern dialects of Hokkien.

The final -o͘ /ɔ/ is realized as a diphthong -ou [ou] in many rural Zhangzhou dialects (in Pinghe, Zhangpu, Yunxiao, Chawan, etc.), similarly to Teochew. Likewise, many of those dialects diphthongize -e /e/ into -ei [ei]. Some dialects, such as Zhangpu, realize them as triphthongs [uou] and [iei]. Changtai dialect uniquely pronounces general Hokkien -o͘ /ɔ/ as [eu]. However, it still uses the vowel /ɔ/, mainly in place of general Hokkien /o/.

-o̤ /ə/ and -ṳ /ɯ/ are found in many Northern Hokkien dialects, including Quanzhou and Tong'an. In Amoy, Jinjiang and among some younger urban Quanzhou speakers, -o̤ /ə/ is merged with /e/. Similarly, the final -ṳ /ɯ/ may be merged with /i/ or /u/ in those dialects. These two finals are not found in Southern dialects of Hokkien.

Chawan dialect in Zhangzhou also has -o̤ /ə/ and -ṳ /ɯ/. Thus, Chawan distinguishes the following finals: -ɛ /ɛ/, -o̤ /ə/, and -ei [ei] (latter corresponding to urban Zhangzhou -e /e/). The dialects of Yunxiao and rural Dongshan are notable for having -ɛ /ɛ/, -e /e/ (in place of Chawan -o̤ /ə/) and -ei /ei/ (in place of urban Zhangzhou -e /e/) as distinct finals.

In Northern Hokkien dialects where the final -o̤ /ə/ is present, it is generally realized as [ɤ̟], and -o /o/ is realized as [o̜]. In dialects where -o̤ /ə/ is absent, [ɤ̹] is a possible realization of -o /o/.

Nasalized finals
non-entering tones	zero medial	-aⁿ /ã/ 三衫		-o͘ ⁿ /ɔ̃/ or /õu/ 毛火	-eⁿ /ẽ/_{N} 泥嬰	-ɛⁿ /ɛ̃/_{S} 生病		-aiⁿ /ãi/ (Note: Used only in syllables with historical nasal initials that have not denasalized in Hokkien.) 乃耐	-auⁿ /ãu/ 貌鬧	-m /m̩/ 毋莓	-ng /ŋ̍/ 方堂
non-entering tones	/-i-/	-iaⁿ /iã/ 兄名	-iⁿ /ĩ/ 年天	-io͘ ⁿ /iɔ̃/_{S} 想羊			-iuⁿ /iũ/ 想_{N}牛_{S}		-iauⁿ /iãu/ 貓鳥		
non-entering tones	/-u-/	-oaⁿ /uã/ 看線			-oeⁿ /uẽ/_{S} 妹糜		-uiⁿ /uĩ/ 每_{N}光_{S}	-oaiⁿ /uãi/ 檨彎			
entering tones	zero medial	-ahⁿ /ãʔ/ (Note: Used in onomatopoeia and ideophones.)		-ohⁿ /ɔ̃ʔ/ 膜瘼	-ehⁿ /ẽʔ/_{N} 脈	-ɛhⁿ /ɛ̃ʔ/_{S} 脈雀		-aihⁿ /ãiʔ/_{N}	-auhⁿ /ãuʔ/	-mh /m̩ʔ/	-ngh /ŋ̍ʔ/
entering tones	/-i-/	-iahⁿ /iãʔ/ 嚇愕	-ihⁿ /ĩʔ/ 物𥍉				-iuhⁿ /iũʔ/_{N}		-iauhⁿ /iãuʔ/		
entering tones	/-u-/				-oehⁿ /uẽʔ/_{S} (Note: /uẽʔ/ is used in 挼 noeh "to rub; to knead" in Chawan dialect, and in 夾 ngoeh "to clamp; to pick with a clamp (e.g. vegetables)" in Amoy and Changtai dialects.)		-uihⁿ /uĩʔ/_{N} 蜢	-oaihⁿ /uãiʔ/			

=== Finals with codas ===
Finals with codas
		-m/-p			-ng/-k			-n/-t	
non-entering tones	zero medial	-am /am/ 南甘	-o̤m /əm/_{N} 森針	-om /ɔm/_{S} 森掩	-ang /aŋ/ 江儂	-o̤ng /əŋ/_{N} (Note: /əŋ/ — used in some coastal Northern dialects (urban Quanzhou, Jinjiang, Nan'an). Also described as -ng /ŋ̍/) 生等	-ong /ɔŋ/ 王東	-an /an/ 安難	-ṳn /ɯn/_{N} (Note: /ɯn~ən/ and /ɯt~ət/ — used in rural Northern dialects, such as Nan'an, Yongchun, Dehua, Huian, etc.) 銀恩
non-entering tones	/-i-/	-iam /iam/ 忝劍	-im /im/ 心金		-iang /iaŋ/ 涼亮	-eng /iŋ/ 令頂	-iong /iɔŋ/ 中弓	-ian /ian/ 建電	-in /in/ 人引
non-entering tones	/-u-/	-oam /uam/ (Note: /uam/ and /uap/ are only used in the Chawan dialect in a few syllables. Most other Hokkien dialects have -oan/-oat instead of -oam/-oap.) 犯凡			-oang /uaŋ/_{N} (Note: /uaŋ/ — used in Northern dialects of Hokkien almost exclusively in 風 hoang "wind". Some dialects also have it in 光 koang "the light". In Teochew and Lengna, this rhyme is used more widely, but in most dialects of Hokkien it has merged with -ong.) 風			-oan /uan/ 川全	-un /un/ 春本
entering tones	zero medial	-ap /ap/ 答雜		-op /ɔp/_{S} (Note: /ɔp/ — used in onomatopoeia and ideophones, e.g. 啑啑叫 cho̍p-cho̍p-kiò "(describes the sound of chewing)", □□ ko̍p-ko̍p "(describes a sticky or claggy thing)", 𢫯 hop "to snare, to catch (with a small net)")	-ak /ak/ 角北	-o̤k /ək/_{N} (Note: /ək/ — used limitedly in the most conservative Northern Hokkien dialects, such as Nan'an or operatic pronunciation.) 德特	-ok /ɔk/ 服國	-at /at/ 殺達	-ṳt /ɯt/_{N} 迄核
entering tones	/-i-/	-iap /iap/ 接粒	-ip /ip/ 立及		-iak /iak/ 逼	-ek /ik/ 昔逆	-iok /iɔk/ 足俗	-iat /iat/ 穴烈	-it /it/ 日失
entering tones	/-u-/	-oap /uap/ 法						-oat /uat/ 越決	-ut /ut/ 骨術

The exact realization of /iŋ/ and /ik/ varies throughout the dialects. For most of them, they are described as [iɪŋ]/[iɪk] or [iəŋ]/[iək]. Many Hokkien dialects in rural Zhangzhou and SEA have them as [eŋ] and [ek]. In urban Quanzhou and Jinjiang, /ik/ is merged with /iak/, but /iŋ/ is preserved.

Hui'an dialect merges -im /im/ and -iam /iam/ into [em], or -ip /ip/ and -iap /iap/ into [ep], etc., and thus it has the following rhymes not found in other dialects: [em], [ep], [en], [et], [eŋ].

While -o̤ /ə/ and -ṳ /ɯ/ are phonemically distinct as standalone finals, they are not distinct in finals with codas. The finals -o̤ng /əŋ/ and -o̤k /ək/ may also be described as /ɯŋ/ and /ɯk/, and -ṳn /ɯn/ and -ṳt /ɯt/ may be described as /ən/ and /ət/ as well. In the conservative Quanzhou operatic pronunciation, they all are pronounced with a diphthong [-ɯə-], except for -o̤k /ək/, which is realized as [-ɯak], influenced by the urban Quanzhou -o̤k/-ek/-iak merger.

However, -ṳn /ɯn/ and -ṳt /ɯt/ share some phonological constraints with /ɯ/ rather than /ə/, e.g. they do not cooccur with labial initials, so *pṳn /*pɯn/, *mṳt /*mɯt/ or *phṳ /*pʰɯ/ are not valid combinations, while syllables like 飛 po̤ /pə/, 崩 po̤ng /pəŋ/ or 墨 bo̤̍k /bək/ do occur at least in some dialects of Quanzhou Hokkien.

In dialects that have -o̤ng /əŋ/ and -ng /ŋ̍/, the two finals are often confounded. Likewise, -m /m̩/ and -o̤m /əm/ may be used interchangeably. -m /m̩/ is assigned mainly to the syllables with zero initial, e.g. in 毋 m̄ "not", 媒 m̂, hm̂ "matchmaker", 梅 m̂ "plum", 莓 m̂ "berry", etc.

=== Rimes used in minor dialects ===
==== Rimes with medial /-ɯ-/ ====
Finals with the medial -ṳ- /-ɯ-/ are mentioned in Lūi-im Biāu-gō͘ (彙音妙悟), an early 19th century Northern Hokkien rimebook, but now they are obsolete in most dialects of Hokkien. They are found only in a few exceptionally conservative dialects, such as Quanzhou operatic, or, per Ang Ui-jin's survey, in the Taiwanese "Old Anxi accent", spoken among older generations in some areas of New Taipei (namely Sanxia, Linkou, Pinglin, Xizhi, Qidu, Pingxi, and Taishan), in Baozhong Township, and in a few villages in Xihu and Puyan. For these dialects, Ang Ui-jin describes this medial as -o̤- /-ə-/ rather than -ṳ- /-ɯ-/, except in the final -ṳiⁿ /ɯĩ/.

Finals with /-ɯ-/
-ṳa /ɯa/_{N} 徛騎	-ṳo /ɯo/_{N} 鉤偶	-ṳe /ɯe/_{N} 街初	
-ṳah /ɯaʔ/_{N} 揭		-ṳeh /ɯeʔ/_{N} 節狹	
-ṳaⁿ /ɯã/_{N} 囝			-ṳiⁿ /ɯĩ/_{N} 先前

==== /uɛ/ and related rimes ====
Some Southern Hokkien dialects (Yunxiao and Chawan) have /ue/ and /uɛ/ as distinct finals. The latter is used in a small number of vernacular readings:

- in 瓜, 花, 華, 化, 怪, 畫, 話 in both of these dialects
- in 果, 過, 課, 火, 貨 additionally in the Chawan dialect

Similarly, those dialects differentiate between /ueʔ/ and /uɛʔ/, but the latter is used exclusively in 劃.

Furthermore, in Chawan dialect, the rime /uẽ/ and /uɛ̃/ are differentiated:

- /uẽ/ is used in 妹, 糜, and 昧
- /uɛ̃/ is used in 關, 橫, 寬, 寡, 杆, and 莖

Other rural Zhangzhou dialects (Nanjing, Pinghe, Changtai, Yunxiao, etc.) have /uẽ/ in both groups of characters.

Zhangpu dialect uses /uɛ/, /uɛʔ/ and /uɛ̃/ consistently in place of /ue/, /ueʔ/ and /uẽ/.

==== /õ/ and related rimes ====
Some Southern Zhangzhou dialects (such as Chawan, Yunxiao, and Zhangpu) differentiate between the rimes o͘ ⁿ /õu/ and oⁿ /õ/.

- o͘ ⁿ /õu/ is used in a small number of characters, including 五 ngó͘, 悟 ngō͘, 奴 nô͘, 努 nó͘, 怒 nō͘, 偶 ngó͘, 午 ngō͘, and 𩵱 ngó͘. Chawan dialect also has this rime in 虎 hó͘ ⁿ, perhaps due to Teochew influence.
- oⁿ /õ/ is used in a much larger set of words, both derived from historical syllables with a nasal initial (我 ngó _{lit.}, 俄 ngô, 娥 ngô, 蛾 ngô, 鵝 ngô, 餓 ngō, 訛 ngô, 臥 ngō, 毛 mô, 耄 mō, 磨 mô _{lit.}, 冒 mō, 瑁 mō, 摸 mo _{lit.}, 魔 mô, 兩 nō _{col.}, 猱 nō, 娜 nó, 糯 nō, 懦 nō) and those that never had a nasal consonant (可 khóⁿ, 好 hóⁿ, 火 hóⁿ, 貨 hòⁿ, 耗 hòⁿ)

Changtai dialect also dfferentiates between these rimes, where they are pronounced as /ẽu/ and /ɔ̃/ respectively. Similar distinction is found in other Southern Min languages, such as Teochew or Luichow, but in most dialects of Hokkien the two rimes are merged into o͘ ⁿ /ɔ̃/.

The rimes ioⁿ /iɔ̃/ and ohⁿ /ɔ̃ʔ/ (as in 漠漠 mo̍h-mo̍h, 膜 mo̍h, 瘼 moh) may be also described as /iõ/ and /õʔ/ for the aforementioned Southern Zhangzhou dialects. There are, however, no rimes */iõu/ or */õuʔ/.

==== Marginal finals ====
Some marginal finals (not mentioned in the above charts) may occur in specific contexts, such as contractions. For example, in Dongshan dialect there is a final -iohⁿ /iɔ̃ʔ/, used in 即樣 chiohⁿ "like this" and 迄樣 hiohⁿ "like that". In Tong'an dialect, there is a final -iai /iai/, used in contractions (遐兮 hiâ--ê > hiâi "those") or in words with the final -ia suffixed with 仔 á (e.g. 車仔 chhia-á > chhiai-á).

== Tones ==
Quanzhou Hokkien tone contours

Amoy Hokkien tone contours

Zhangzhou Hokkien tone contours

"Dark tones" 陰 im on the left, "light tones" 陽 iông on the right. "Entering tones" 入 ji̍p are in pale color.
Tone ①陰平 Tone ⑤陽平
Tone ②陰上 Tone ⑥陽上 (only Quanzhou)
Tone ③陰去 Tone ⑦陽去 (only Amoy, Zhangzhou)

Traditionally, four Middle Chinese tones are called "level" 平 piâⁿ, "rising" 上 chiǔⁿ, "departing" 去 khṳ̀ and "entering" 入 ji̍p. These names are mnemonics illustrating the corresponding tone, e.g. the word "level" 平 piâⁿ has the level tone, the word "to enter" 入 ji̍p has the entering tone, etc. In modern languages, these four tones are further divided into two categories: the "dark" (陰 im) or "upper" (上 chiǔⁿ) tones and the "light" (陽 iông) or "lower" (下 ě) tones, giving a total of 8 tones in traditional system.

The tones can be counted in two patterns: the "dark—light" order (the checked tones are 7 and 8) is more common in works published in China, and the "level—rising—departing—entering" order (the checked tones are 4 and 8) is more popular in Taiwan. This article follows the latter numbering system.

陰 "dark tones"
tone name	陰平 "dark level"	陰上 "dark rising"	陰去 "dark departing"	陰入 "dark entering"
Pe̍h-ōe-jī diacritic	a	á	à	ah (-p, -t, -k)
tone number	①	②	③	④
examples	詩 si	死 sí	四 sì	薛 sih
examples	君 kun	滾 kún	棍 kùn	骨 kut
examples	東 tong	董 tóng	棟 tòng	督 tok
examples	耽 tam	膽 tám	擔 tàm	答 tap
陽 "light tones"
tone name	陽平 "light level"	陽上 "light rising"	陽去 "light departing"	陽入 "light entering"
Pe̍h-ōe-jī diacritic	â	ǎ	ā	a̍h (-p, -t, -k)
tone number	⑤	⑥	⑦	⑧
examples	時 sî	是 sǐ	示 sī	蝕 si̍h
examples	群 kûn	窘 kǔn	郡 kūn	滑 ku̍t
examples	同 tông	動 tǒng	洞 tōng	獨 to̍k
examples	談 tâm	湛 tǎm	淡 tām	踏 ta̍p

In most dialects of Hokkien, there are only 7 distinct citation tones, as some of the 8 traditional tones merge into a single tone. Certain dialects (the Lengna dialect or the Changkeng-Yidu dialect in Anxi and Yongchun) distinguish all eight tones, and some (Jinjiang) have only 6 citation tones due to additional mergers. Many Northern dialects merge certain tones in the citation form, but not in the sandhi form.

Taiwanese and Amoy Hokkien citation tones
	平	上	去	入
陰	①君 kun [kun˦]	②滾 kún [kun˥˧]	③棍 kùn [kun˧˩]	④骨 kut [kut˧˨]
陽	⑤群 kûn [kun˨˩˦]	⑦郡 kūn [kun˧]		⑧滑 ku̍t [kut˦]

Tone contours across the Hokkien dialects
	citation tones				post-sandhi tones				
	平	上	去	入	平	上	去	入	
	平	上	去	入	平	上	去	-h	-p, -t, -k
Dehua
陰	13	42	21	42	22	44	42		
陽	44	35	21	35	21				
urban Quanzhou, Nan'an, Hui'an, Lukang
陰	33	554	41	5	33	214	554		24
陽	214	22	41	24	22				
Jinjiang, Shishi
陰	33	55	41	54	33	214	55		24
陽	214	33	41	24	22				
Tong'an, Xiang'an
陰	44	31	11	1	33	214/33 (Note: 214 is used before rising 上 and departing 去 tones, as well as before the light entering tone 陽入; 33 is used before level 平 tones and the dark entering tone 陰入.)	5/31 (Note: 5 is used before rising 上 and departing 去 tones, as well as before the light entering tone 陽入; 31 is used before level 平 tones and the dark entering tone 陰入.)		
陽	214	33		5	11				
Taipei
陰	44	53	21	32	22	44	53		54 (Note: Tone ④陰入 after sandhi is often described as high level 4 ˦. However, some studies show that it is still not identical to pre-sandhi tone ⑧陽入 in Amoy and Taiwanese Hokkien, but has a slight falling contour, akin to shortened post-sandhi tone ③陰去.)
陽	214	22		4	21				32
Amoy, Yongchun, Changtai, Kaohsiung
陰	44	53	21	32	22	44	53		54
陽	214	22		4	22	21			32
urban Zhangzhou, Longhai, Pinghe, Nanjing
陰	34	53	21	32	22	34	53		54
陽	213	22		121	22	31			32
Zhangpu, Yunxiao, Dongshan, Hua'an
陰	44	53	21	32	22	44	53		54
陽	212	22		213	22	21			32
Chawan
陰	55	53	21	3	33	35	53		54
陽	213	33		213	21	31			3

Tone contours vary across the Hokkien dialects.

"Dark level" tone ①陰平
High level 44 ˦ ~ 55 ˥ in most dialects.
May be slightly lower in Quanzhou dialects (33 ˧ ~ 44 ˦).
In urban Zhangzhou dialect it shifts towards high rising 34 ˧˦.

"Dark rising" tone ②陰上
High falling 53 ˥˧ ~ 51 ˥˩ in most dialects.
Coastal Quanzhou dialects (urban Quanzhou, Nan'an, Jinjiang, etc) have it as high level with a small drop at the end (55 ˥ ~ 554 ˥˥˦).

"Dark departing" tone ③陰去
Low falling 31 ˧˩ in most dialects.
May have higher onset (41 ˦˩) in Northern Hokkien and lower onset (21 ˨˩ or even 11 ˩) in Southern dialects.

"Dark entering" tone ④陰入
Mid-falling 32 ˧˨ in Southern dialects, as well as in Amoy, Yongchun, Tong'an, etc.
High falling 54 ˥˦ in Quanzhou dialects.

"Light level" tone ⑤陽平
Mid or high dipping tone 214 ˨˩˦ in Northern Hokkien, including Amoy.
Lower dipping 212 ˨˩˨ ~ 213 ˨˩˧ in Southern Hokkien, although sometimes it may become more level 22 ˨ or lose its rising part (in this case, however, it does not merge with the low-falling tone (③陰去), but has a longer low segment with an overall contour 211 ˨˩˩).
Since the initial falling part is natural for rising tones in tonal languages, many works ignore it and describe this tone as rising instead of dipping (as 13 ˩˧ for Southern dialects of Hokkien or 24 ˨˦ for Northern dialects).

"Light rising" tone ⑥陽上
Mid-level with a slight drop 22 ˨ ~ 221 ˨˨˩ in some Northern dialects (urban Quanzhou, Nan'an, Hui'an, etc).
Merged with tone ⑦陽去 in Southern dialects and some peripheral Northern dialects (Amoy, Tong'an, Yongchun, etc).

"Light departing" tone ⑦陽去
Mid-level 22 ˨ ~ 33 ˧ in Southern dialects, as well as Amoy Hokkien.
Merged with tone ③陰去 in many Quanzhou dialects (but still distinguished in sandhi).

"Light entering" tone ⑧陽入
In greater Quanzhou and Zhangzhou Hokkien, its contour is similar to that of tone ⑤陽平 (mid- or low-rising).
In Amoy and Taiwanese Hokkien, it is a high level tone 4 ˦.

== Tone sandhi ==
A phrase in Hokkien is divided into "tone groups", where each syllable except the last one undergoes the tone sandhi.

In examples below, the syllables that do not undergo tone sandhi are in bold. The Pe̍h-ōe-jī orthography of examples is adjusted to concisely represent as much dialectal variations as possible, e.g. distinguishing eight tones, the initial j-, the vowel ɛ along with the vowel ṳ, etc. — note that no single Hokkien dialect maintains all of these distinctions.

The last syllable of a noun does not undergo sandhi. A noun may be preceded by a classifier with a numeral or a demonstrative pronoun, all of which do undergo sandhi. If the noun is omitted, however, the classifier preserves its original tone.

Components of the numerals generally undergo the sandhi, except the words 萬 bān and 千 chhṳiⁿ/chheng:

五萬｜六千｜三百二十三 gǒ͘-bān la̍k-chheng saⁿ-pah jī-cha̍p-saⁿ '56,323'
西曆｜一千｜九百二十六年 se-le̍k chi̍t-chheng káu-pah jī-cha̍p-la̍k nî 'year 1926'

Noun adjuncts generally undergo tone sandhi:

台北動物園 Tâi-pak tǒng-bu̍t-hn̂g 'Taipei zoo'
韓國同事 Hân-kok tông-sṳ̄ 'a Korean colleague'
中國歷史 Tiong-kok le̍k-sṳ́ 'Chinese history'
風流人物 hong-liû jîn-bu̍t 'an outstanding personage'
福建省 Hok-kiàn-séng 'Fujian province'
福建儂 Hok-kiàn-lâng 'Hoklo (Fujianese) person'

However, in a series of noun adjuncts, only the last one undergoes tone sandhi:

國立｜台灣大學 kok-li̍p Tâi-oân tōa-o̍h 'National Taiwan University'

The "part-of-a-whole" constructions, particularly the extended place names, are divided into separate tone groups word-by-word:

中華｜人民｜共和國 Tiong-hôa Jîn-bîn Kiōng-hô-kok 'People's Republic of China'
江蘇｜南京｜中山陵 Kang-so͘ Lâm-kiaⁿ Tiong-san-lêng 'Sun Yat-sen Mausoleum, Nanjing, Jiangsu'
北京大學｜中文系 Pak-kiaⁿ tōa-o̍h Tiong-bûn-hē 'Department of Chinese Language and Literature, Peking University' — note that the word 北京 Pak-kiaⁿ is a noun adjunct here and as such it undergoes tone sandhi

A name with a surname is treated as a single tone group:

鄭成功 Tēⁿ Sêng-kong 'Te Sengkong'

=== Sandhi in four-character idioms ===
Four-character compounds are usually divided into two tone groups two characters each:

內外｜交困 lōe-gōe kau-khùn
橋過｜柺抽 kiô-kè koáiⁿ-thiu
古今｜中外 kó͘-kim tiong-gōe
一心｜一意 it-sim it-ì
世外｜桃源 sè-gōe thô-goân
欣欣｜向榮 him-him hiòng-êng
斤斤｜計較 kṳn-kṳn kè-kàu
萬事｜如意 bān-sṳ̄ jû-ì

文武｜之道 bûn-bú chi tǒ
平心｜而論 pêng-sim jî lūn
分秒｜必爭 hun-biáu pit-cheng
兵強｜馬壯 peng-kiâng má-chòng
火眼｜金睛 hóⁿ-gán kim-cheng
風吹｜日曝 hong-chhe ji̍t-pha̍k
長喙｜短耳 tn̂g-chhùi tér-hǐ
骹痠｜手軟 kha-sng chhiú-nńg

Some four-character idioms are divided into tone groups of one and three characters, where the first character is the subject of an idiom:

馬｜不停蹄 má put-thêng-tê
金｜無足赤 kim bû-chiok-chhek

氣｜吞山河 khì thun-san-hô
得｜不償失 tek put-siâng-sit

Words 之 --chi (used as an object, 'him', not a possessive particle) and 者 --chiá (used as a topic marker) are pronounced with neutral tone in idioms:

姑妄聽之 ko͘-bōng-theng--chi
聽之｜任之 theng--chi jīm--chi

召之｜即來 tiàu--chi chek-lâi
來者｜不拒 lâi--chiá put-kṳ̆

Some non-literary idioms read with vernacular readings form a single tone segment:

五花十色 gō͘-hoe-cha̍p-sek
儂來客去 lâng-lâi-khɛh-khṳ̀

無閒無工 bô-êng-bô-kang
牛鬼蛇神 gû-kúi-chôa-sîn

== Neutral tone ==
Hokkien has neutral tone (marked with double dash—before the syllable in Pe̍h-ōe-jī).

Neutral tone is pronounced as mid-low level 33~22. The syllable before neutral tone does not undergo tone sandhi, but preserves its original tone. Aside from having the neutral tone, unstressed syllables may undergo other changes, the most prominent of them being the loss the glottal stop and voicing of the initial:

踢破 that--phòa > that--bòa 'to kick and break'
跋倒 poa̍h--tó > poa̍h--lə́ 'to fall down'
掠着 lia̍h--tio̍h > liah--lio̍ 'to catch; to grab'
寒冬 kôaⁿ--tang > kôaⁿ--lang 'winter'
熱冬 joa̍h--tang > joa̍h--lang 'summer'
走出去 cháu--chhut-khì > cháu--chhut-ì or cháu--chhui 'to run away'
𣍐克得 bǒe-khat--tit > bǒe-khat--le 'to be unwilling'

The following combinations with the generic classifier 個 ê may have the preceding coda voiced and reduplicated:

即個 chit--ê > chid--dê 'this'
迄個 hit--ê > hid--dê 'that'
一個 chi̍t--ê > chi̍d--dê 'one + classifier'

Neutral tone is used in the following contexts:

- in the possessive particle 兮 --e

紅兮 âng--ê 'red'

- in some verbal particles, as well as the result and direction complements
- in sentence-final particles (including negative particles forming questions)

汝說無？ lṳ́ so̤h--bô

- in suffixes used in direction words, such as 爿 --pêng, 勢 --si, 邊 --piⁿ, and 頭 --thau
- in certain time phrases

前年 chûn--nî 'the year before last'
後年 ǎu--nî 'the year after next'
後日 ǎu--ji̍t 'day after tomorrow' (but 後日 ǎu-ji̍t 'the future, the days to come')
日時 ji̍t--sî 'daytime'
日間 ji̍t--kan 'daytime'
暝時 mî--sî 'evening'
暗時 àm--sî 'evening'

- in personal pronouns when they are used as direct objects (unless emphasis is put on the pronoun)

叫我 kiò--góa 'to call me'
叫伊 kiò--i 'to call him/her'

- particularly, in the indefinite pronoun 儂 lâng

幫助儂 pang-chō͘--lâng 'to help somebody'
做儂 chòe--lâng 'to be bethrothed' (but 做儂 chòe-lâng 'to behave properly; to conduct oneself')
怪儂 koài--lâng 'to blame somebody' (but 怪儂 koài-lâng 'strange person')
拗儂 áu--lâng 'to enforce'
驚儂 kiaⁿ--lâng 'scary, frightening' (but 驚儂 kiaⁿ-lâng 'filthy; disgusting')

- in titles after surnames

林氏 Lîm--sǐ 'Mr. Lim'
陳生 Tân--sian 'Mr. Tan'
蔡先生 Chhòa--sian-siⁿ 'Mr. Chhoa'

- particularly, in some words with 哥 ko

明哥 bing--ko "brother Ming"
法哥 huat--ko "brother Hwat"
農哥 lông--ko "(derogatory) peasant, farmer"
頭哥 thau--ko "boss"

- particularly, in placenames formed from a surname and the word 厝 chhù 'house'

黃厝 N̂g--chhù
吳厝 Ngô͘--chhù
蘇厝 So͘--chhù
呂厝 Lṳ̄--chhù
周厝 Chiu--chhù
施厝 Si--chhù

== The suffix 仔 -á ==
The suffix 仔 -á is related to some special phonetic changes.

Syllables before 仔 -á may induce its change due to assimilation.

word	nominal form	assimilated form		meaning
賊仔	chha̍t-á	> chha̍t-lá	> chha̍l-lá	«thief»
盒仔	a̍p-á	> a̍p-bá	> a̍b-bá	«small box»
竹仔	tek-á	> tek-gá	> teg-gá	«bamboo»
柑仔	kam-á	> kam-má		«tangerine»
囡仔	gín-á	> gín-ná		«child»
翁仔	ang-á	> ang-ngá		«doll»
圓仔	îⁿ-á	> îⁿ-áⁿ		«meatball»
美仔	bí-á	> bí-ah		«Bi-a (a girl's name)»
箬仔	hio̍h-á	> hio̍h-ah		«leaf»

Some assimilations are dialect-specific. E.g. in Tong'an dialect, a syllable ending in -a changes it to -ai before 仔 -á: 車仔 chhia-á > chhiai-á, 鴨仔 ah-á > aih-á, 籃仔 nâ-á > nâi-á, 衫仔 saⁿ-á > saiⁿ-á, etc.

The tone sandhi before 仔 -á is different from general Hokkien tone sandhi.

== Historical phonology and internal differences ==
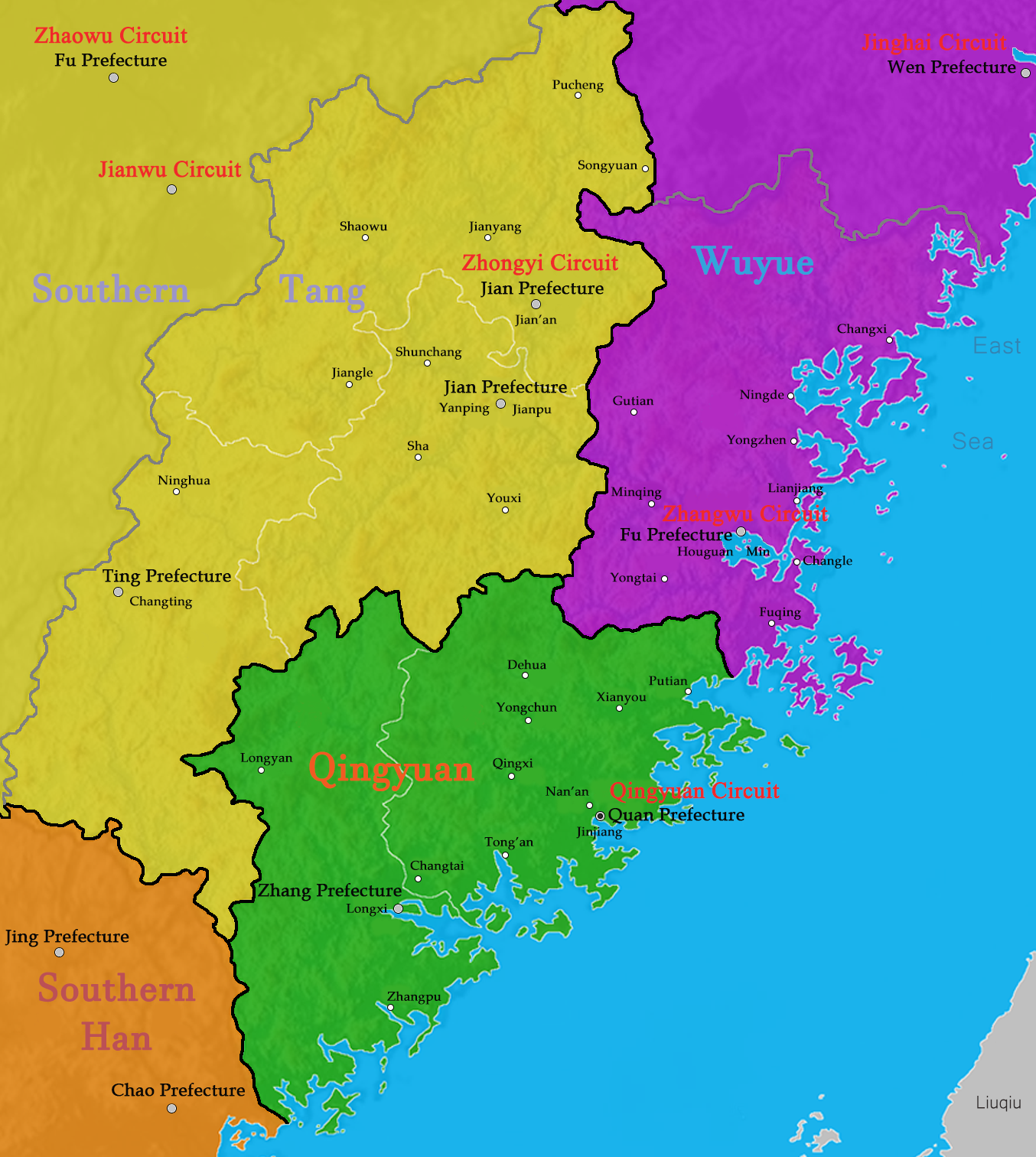
The territory of the Chheng-goân (Qingyuan) Circuit in 10th c. coincides with modern Hokkien-speaking area

The earliest sources on the Hokkien phonology are the rhyme dictionaries Lūi-im Biāu-ngō͘ (彙音妙悟) and Lūi-chi̍p Ngé-sio̍k-thong Si̍p-ngó͘-im (彙集雅俗通十五音). The former describes the Quanzhou Hokkien, while the latter describes the Zhangzhou Hokkien.

Current Hokkien-speaking area mostly coincides with the 10th century Chheng-goân Circuit, a de facto independent polity that emerged after the fall of the Min Empire. The polity was divided into two prefectures, Quanzhou (which also included modern Putian, Changtai and most of Xiamen) and Zhangzhou (which also included the Hokkien-speaking areas of modern Longyan), and the border between these medieval prefectures roughly coincides with certain modern Hokkien isoglosses. The Chiang-bú Circuit (彰武軍), which was under the rule of Wuyue, covers the Hokchew-speaking area, and Tiong-gī Circuit (忠義軍) ruled by Southern Tang lies in Inland Min- and Hakka-speaking area in Fujian.

Changtai dialect contains features of both Northern (Quanzhou) and Southern (Zhangzhou) dialect areas, atop of having some of its own unique characteristics. Changtai was a part of Quanzhou prefecture in 6—10 centuries, until being transferred under Zhangzhou's jurisdiction in 980.

Chawan dialect is a distinct variety of Hokkien. It may have received some influence from Teochew, but its amount is contestable.

The Eastern Namoa dialect shows some traits of Zhangzhou Hokkien, as this half of the Namoa island was previously included in the Zhangzhou prefecture, yet in most aspects it still clusters more with Teochew.

Hai Lok Hong dialect has even more features typical for southern dialects of Hokkien, and may be classified as a distinct dialect of either Teochew or Hokkien, or a variety of Southern Min separate from both of them. The charts below follow the classification of The Language Atlas of China, where Hai Lok Hong is included in Teochew.

The Lengna and Zhangping dialects are very different from mainstream Hokkien. At the same time, they form a continuum with Zhangzhou dialects. They are sometimes classified as the Western branch of Hokkien.

Datian Min is usually included in Southern Min as a distinct variety, apart from Hokkien and Teochew. It is divided into two dialects, Qianlu (the 'Frontlect') and Houlu, the former lying closer to Hokkien, and the latter having more Central Min influence. An undescribed variety of Southern Min in the north of Dehua is reported to be quite different from other Hokkien dialects and may belong to the same Hokkien—Central Min transitionary area as Datian Min.

Hinghwa is a language closely affiliated with Hokkien, yet it has received heavy Hokchew influence and is not usually considered a part of Hokkien itself.

=== Initial correspondences ===
==== Denasalization ====
One large difference between Hokkien and Teochew is the degree of denasalization. Teochew /n/, /m/ and /ŋ/ are usually considered phonemes rather than allophones of the voiced plosives /d/, /b/, /g/.

In Teochew, most syllables with codas preserve the nasal initial, with a few exceptions: denasalization frequently occurs in some specific syllables, like buang (亡, 忘, 望, 萬), bak (木, 墨, but mak: 目), leng (能, 寧, 獰), long (農, 膿, 濃), lang (濃, 難, 囊, but nang: 儂), lung (嫩, 媆), bung (悶, 聞, 文, 紋, but mung: 門, 晚, 問). It may also sporadically occur in some individual characters: 勿, 蜜, 玉, 獄, etc. In Hokkien on the other hand, syllables with codas (excluding -h) can never have nasal initials.

In Hinghwa, Hokkien voiced consonants /b/, /dz/, /g/, including cases when they are derived from nasal initials, are further devoiced into /p/, /ts/, /k/.

=== Final correspondences ===
The charts below illustrate the common correspondences in rimes between various dialects of Hokkien, as well as related Southern Min languages. Middle Chinese finals are transcribed using Baxter's transcription, and Proto-Southern-Min reconstructions are per Kwok Bit-chee.

In the example characters, literary and vernacular readings are marked by different types of underlines. Note that the examples are given primarily for Hokkien correspondences, and other languages may lack corresponding readings for some of the example characters.

==== Open-vowel finals ====
In the tables below, characters after the double line ‖ have nasalization at least in some dialects of Hokkien.

MC	PSM	examples	Hokkien						Teochew			Lengna			Datian	Hinghwa
MC	PSM	examples	gQZ TA	JJ PP	AM TP	AM KH	gZZ	CA	ST	TY	HLH EN	LN	JC	XQ	FL	Hinghwa
(Note: 魚三開 -jo with all MC initials except retroflex sibilants)	*ɯ	豬魚語箸舉	ɯ	i	u	i	i	ɯ	ɯ	u	i	i	i	iau	i	y
(Note: 支三開 -j(i)e, 脂三開 -(j)ij, 之三開 -i, 微三開 -jɨj with sibilant initials)	*ɿ	自事思史師	ɯ	i	u	u	u	ɯ	ɯ	u	u	ɯ	u	o	o	o
(Note: 虞三合 -ju with dental and retroflex sibilants, velars, laryngeals)	—	遇區樹取雨	u	u	u	u	i	ɯ	u	u	i	i	i	i	i	y
(Note: 虞三合 -ju with palatal sibilants and labials; vernacular readings cognate to 尤三開 -juw with velars and labials; some literary readings from 尤三開 -juw with labials)	*u	府武主浮舊	u	u	u	u	u	u	u	u	u	u	u	u	u	u
(Note: 支三開 -j(i)e, 脂三開 -(j)ij, 之三開 -i, 微三開 -jɨj with all initials except sibilants; some readings from 齊四開 -ej)	*i	米知眉李時‖泥彌	i	i	i	i	i	i	i	i	i	i	i	i	i	i

MC	PSM	examples	Hokkien										Teochew		Lengna			Datian	Hinghwa	
MC	PSM	examples	LK	SX	gQZ TA	JJ AM TP PP	CT	KH	ZZ PH NJ	ZP	YX	CA	ST TY	HLH	LN	JC	XQ	FL	XY	PT
(Note: literary readings from 麻二開 -æ with non-velar initials)	*a	巴霸亞茶叉‖馬拿	a	a	a	a	a	a	a	a	a	a	a	a	a	a	a	a	a	a
(Note: literary readings from 麻二開 -æ with velar initials)	—	家夏嘉佳茄‖雅	a	a	a	a	a	a	ɛ	ɛ	ɛ	ɛ	ia	ia, e	ia	ia	ia	a	a	a
(Note: vernacular readings cognate to 麻二開 -æ)	*e	茶家馬牙叉‖罵	e	e	e	e	e	e	ɛ	ɛ	ɛ	ɛ	e	e	iɛ	e	e	a	ɒ	ɒ
(Note: few vernacular readings cognate to various MC rimes after alveolar initials)	*ø	坐袋退短胎	ə	ə	ə	e	e	e	e	ɛ	e	ə	o	e	ie	ie	ei	e	ø	ø
(Note: vernacular readings cognate to 戈一合 -wa, 支三合 -jw(i)e after non-velar initials)	*uø	皮吹被垂飛	ə	ə	ə	e	ue	ue	ue	uɛ	ue	ue	ue	ue	ue	ue	ue	ue	uoi	ue
(Note: vernacular readings cognate to 戈一合 -wa, 支三合 -jw(i)e after velar initials)	*uø	果過課火貨	ə	ə	ə	e	ue	ue	ue	uɛ	ue	uɛ	ue	ue	ue	ue	ue	ue	uoi	ue
(Note: 泰一合 -waj, 祭三合 -jw(i)ej; some 廢三合 -jwoj; 灰一合 -woj after labial and certain other initials; 泰一開 -aj with labial initials except 明 m-)	*ue	配背回退罪	ue	ue	ue	ue	ue	ue	ue	uɛ	ue	ue	ue	ue	ue	ue	ue	ue	uoi	ue
(Note: vernacular readings cognate to 麻二合 -wæ after velar initials)	*ue	瓜花化話	ue	ue	ue	ue	ue	ue	ua	uɛ	uɛ	uɛ	ue	ue	uɛ	ue	uɛ	ua	ua	ua
(Note: few vernacular readings of different origin)	—	蓋芥寡	ua	ua	ua	ua	ua	ua	ua	ua	ua	ua	ua	ua	uɛ	ue	uɛ	ua	ua	ua
(Note: 麻二合 -wæ; vernacular readings cognate to 歌一開 -a)	*ua	大紙沙破蛇‖麻	ua	ua	ua	ua	ua	ua	ua	ua	ua	ua	ua	ua	ua	ua	ɔ	ua	ua	ua
(Note: few vernacular readings cognate to 魚三開 -jo with retroflexes (plosives and sibilants))	*ioi	初貯梳黍苧	ɯe	əe	ue	ue	ue	e	e	iei	ei	ei	iu	iu	ui	ui, iu	ai	i	y	y
(Note: vernacular readings cognate to 佳二開 -ɛɨ, 齊四開 -ej after non-labial initials)	*oi	雞街溪細解	ɯe	əe	ue	ue	ue	e	e	iei	ei	ei	oi	ei	ie	ie	ei	e	e	e
(Note: vernacular readings cognate to 佳二開 -ɛɨ, 齊四開 -ej after labial initials)	*oi	買賣批稗䫌	ue	ue	ue	ue	ue	e	e	iei	ei	ei	oi	ei	ie	ie	ei	e	e	e
(Note: 祭三開 -j(i)ej, 齊四開 -ej)	—	低系西迷弟	e	e	e	e	ue	e	e	iei	ei	ei	i	i	ie	ie	ei	e	e	e

MC	PSM	examples	Hokkien								Teochew		Lengna			Datian	Hinghwa	
MC	PSM	examples	LK	PP	gQZ	YC	ZZ AM TA	CT	ZP	YX CA	ST TY HLH	TC	LN	JC	XQ	FL	XY	PT
(Note: 豪一開 -aw; note that in Teochew characters from this rime have much higher incidence of readings with -au, while readings with -o are often not used)	*o	報寶道保抱‖毛冒	o, ɔ	o, ɔ	o, ɔ	o, ɔ	o	ɔ	o	o	o	o	o	uo	o	o, ɔ	ɒ, o	ɒ, o
(Note: 歌一開 -a, 戈一合 -wa)	*o	左多波朵破‖怒懦	o, ɔ	o, ɔ	o, ɔ	o, ɔ	o	ɔ	o	o	o	o	o	uo	o	o, ɔ	ɒ, o	ɒ, o
(Note: 魚三開 -jo with retroflex sibilants; in Hokkien also as a variant for characters from 虞三合 -ju with retroflex sibilants)	—	所初助楚阻	ɔ	ɔ	ɔ	ɔ	ɔ	eu	uou	ou	o	o	o	uo	o	u	ø	ø
(Note: 模一開 -u)	*ou	土布路烏古‖五奴	ɔ	ɔ	ɔ	ɔ	ɔ	eu	uou	ou	ou	ou	u	ɔ	u	u	ou	ou
(Note: 尤三開 -juw with retroflex sibilants; note that in Hokkien such characters often have more common vulgar readings (俗讀) with -o)	—	搜鄹鄒瘦驟	ɯo	iə, io	io	ɔ	ɔ	eu	uou	ou	ou	ou	au	au	ɔ	ɔ	ieu	iau
(Note: literary readings from 侯一開 -uw with non-labial initials; some literary readings from 尤三開 -juw with labials except 明 m- (mostly in Hokkien, e.g. 浮, 罘, 芣, 桴, 否, etc))	—	偶侯樓鉤厚	ɯo	iə, io	io	ɔ	ɔ	eu	uou	ou	ou	ou	au	au	ɔ	ɔ	ieu	iau
(Note: literary readings from 侯一開 -uw with labial initials; some literary readings from 尤三開 -juw with 明 m-)	—	貿牟懋茂謀	io	io	io	ɔ	ɔ	eu	uou	ou	ou	ou	au	au	ɔ	ɔ	ieu	iau
(Note: vernacular readings cognate to 宵三開 - j(i)ew, 蕭四開 -ew; 戈三開 -ia)	*io	叫小標笑茄	io	io	io	io	io	iɔ	io	io	io	ie	io	io	io	io	ieu	iau
(Note: 麻三開 -jæ; vernacular readings cognate to 支三開 -j(i)e)	*ia	寫謝邪也舍	ia	ia	ia	ia	ia	ia	ia	ia	ia	ia	ia	ia	ia	ia	ia	ia
(Note: 咍一開 -oj, 皆二開 -ɛj, 夬二開 -æj, 佳二開 -ɛɨ, 廢三開 -joj; 泰一開 -aj with non-labial initials and 明 m-; vernacular readings cognate to 脂三開 -(j)ij and 之三開 -i)	*ai	才台代在大‖賣乃	ai	ai	ai	ai	ai	ai	ai	ai	ai	ai	ai	ai	ɛ	ɛ	ai	ai
(Note: 肴二開 -æw; vernacular readings cognate to 侯一開 -uw; variant readings cognate to 豪一開 -aw (more common in Teochew, less common in Hokkien; when present for a character, it is usually described as the literary reading, while readings with -o are considered vernacular))	*au	包草孝走狗‖貌鬧	au	au	au	au	au	au	au	au	au	au	au	au	ɔ	ɔ	au	au
(Note: 支三合 -jw(i)e, 脂三合 -(j)wij, 微三合 -jwɨj, 齊四合 -wej; some 廢三合 -jwoj; vernacular readings cognate to 微三開 -jɨj; 灰一合 -woj with dental stop initials)	*ui	非貴爲衣氣	ui	ui	ui	ui	ui	ui	ui	ui	ui	ui	ui	ui	uai	ui	ui	ui
(Note: 幽三開 -jiw; some vernacular readings cognate to 虞三合 -ju; 尤三開 -juw with non-labial initials; few literary readings from 尤三開 -juw with labials (mostly in Teochew))	*iu	久友守手首‖扭謬	iu	iu	iu	iu	iu	iu	iu	iu	iu	iu	iu	iu	iau	iu	iu	iu
(Note: 宵三開 -j(i)ew, 蕭四開 -ew)	*iau	了小照條肖‖貓鳥	iau	iau	iau	iau	iau	iau	iau	iau	iau	iou	iau	iau	iɔ	iɔ	ieu	iau
(Note: 皆二合 -wɛj, 夬二合 -wæj, 佳二合 -wɛɨ)	*uai	快怪	uai	uai	uai	uai	uai	uai	uai	uai	uai	uai	uai	uai	uɛ	uɛ	uoi	ue

==== Finals with -n/-t ====
Teochew has mostly merged -n/-t with -ŋ/-k, except for some peripheral dialects. The dialect of Fenghuang County in Chaozhou preserves the most -n/-t finals (a total of six: -un, -in, -uan, -ien, -an, -ɯn). The Eastern Namoa dialect preserves only -in and -un. In Hai Lok Hong, while some dialects also preserve -in and -un, most Western Hai Lok Hong dialects only preserve -un, and most Eastern Hai Lok Hong dialects merge all -n/-t finals with -ŋ/-k, like in Teochew.

MC	PSM	examples	Hokkien						Teochew					Lengna			Datian	Hinghwa	
MC	PSM	examples	LK	SX	HA	NA YC	QZ TA JJ AM PP	gZZ	TC	ST	KY	TY	HLH EN	LN	JC	XQ	FL	XY	PT
(Note: 寒一開 -an, 刪二開 -æn, 山二開 -ɛn)	*an (*at)	單難安山等 （八辣殺渴葛）	an (at)	an (at)	an (at)	an (at)	an (at)	an (at)	aŋ (ak)	aŋ (ak)	aŋ (ak)	aŋ (ak)	aŋ (ak)	an (at)	an (at)	an (aʔ)	aŋ (aʔ)	aŋ (aʔ)	aŋ (aʔ)
(Note: 魂一合 -won, 文三合 -jun, 眞三合 -win, 淳三合 -(j)win)	*un (*ut)	分本門問船 （不出突骨弗）	un (ut)	un (ut)	un (ut)	un (ut)	un (ut)	un (ut)	uŋ (uk)	uŋ (uk)	uŋ (uk)	uŋ (uk)	un (ut)	un (ut)	un (ut)	oŋ (oʔ)	ueŋ (oʔ)	uoŋ (uoʔ)	ɔŋ (ɔʔ)
(Note: 痕一開 -on, 欣三開 -jɨn)	*ɯn (—)	恩銀近根筋 （迄屹屼）	ɯən (ɯət)	ɯn (ɯt)	ən (ət)	ən (ət)	un (ut)	in (it)	ɯŋ (ɯk)	ɯŋ (ɯk)	eng (ek)	iŋ (ik)	in (it)	in (it)	in (it)	in (eʔ)	eŋ (eʔ)	yŋ (yʔ)	yŋ (yʔ)
(Note: 眞三開 -(j)in, 臻三開 -in)	*in (*it)	陳神面品民 （一必日質失）	in (it)	in (it)	en (et)	in (it)	in (it)	in (it)	iŋ (ik)	iŋ (ik)	eng (ek)	iŋ (ik)	in (it)	in (it)	in (it)	in (eʔ)	eŋ (eʔ)	iŋ (iʔ)	iŋ (iʔ)
(Note: 元三開 -jon, 先四開 -en, 仙三開 -j(i)en, most 先四合 -wen, some 仙三合 -jw(i)en)	*ian (*iat)	善戰天見建 （列別舌烈血）	iɛn (iɛt)	iɛn (iɛt)	en (et)	iɛn (iɛt)	iɛn (iɛt)	iɛn (iɛt)	ieŋ (iek)	iaŋ (iak)	iaŋ (iak)	iaŋ (iak)	iaŋ (iak)	iɛn (iɛt)	en (et)	ien (iaʔ)	iaŋ (iaʔ)	ɛŋ (ɛʔ)	ɛŋ (ɛʔ)
(Note: 元三合 -jwon, most 仙三合 -jw(i)en)	*uan (*uat)	傳權村元全 （說絕決越雪）	uan (uat)	uan (uat)	uan (uat)	uan (uat)	uan (uat)	uan (uat)	ueŋ (uek)	uaŋ (uak)	uaŋ (uak)	uaŋ (uak)	uaŋ (uak)	iɛn (iɛt)	uan (uat)	ien (iaʔ)	uaŋ (uaʔ)	yøŋ (yøʔ)	œŋ (œʔ)
(Note: 桓一合 -wan, 刪二合 -wæn, 山二合 -wɛn, some 先四合 -wen)	*uan (*uat)	官關亂判歡 （活伐奪末發）	uan (uat)	uan (uat)	uan (uat)	uan (uat)	uan (uat)	uan (uat)	ueŋ (uek)	uaŋ (uak)	uaŋ (uak)	uaŋ (uak)	uaŋ (uak)	uan (uat)	uan (uat)	uan (uaʔ)	uaŋ (uaʔ)	uoŋ (uoʔ)	uaŋ (uaʔ)

The choose of -ian/-iat or -uan/-uat for a given character derived from MC rhymes 仙三合 -jw(i)en and 先四合 -wen is not consistent among different languages. For 仙三合 -jw(i)en, the generally used reflex is -uan/-uat for most Southern Min languages, except Hinghwa and Lengna, where it is -ian/-iat. However, there is a tendency in Hokkien to have -ian/-iat here when the MC initial was 以 y-, either as the only reading or a non-standard popular variant. For 先四合 -wen, the general reflex is -ian/-iat.

The shape of a character may influence the choose of -ian/-iat or -uan/-uat. Characters with 肙 as the phonetic element (涓, 罥, 鵑, 鞙) tend to have -uan in Hokkien, but -ian in other languages. Characters derived from 矞, 血 and 穴 tend to have -iat in Hokkien, but -uat in Teochew. Characters derived from 夬 and 癸 tend to have -uat in mainstream Hokkien and Teochew, but -iat in Hinghwa, Lengna, Hai Lok Hong, etc.

==== Finals with -m/-p ====
MC	PSM	examples	Hokkien							Teochew		Lengna			Datian	Hinghwa	
MC	PSM	examples	LK	gQZ	HA	TA SX TP	AM	gZZ	CA	ST TY	HLH EN	LN	JC	XQ	FL	XY	PT
(Note: 談一開 -am, 覃一開 -om, 銜二開 -æm, 咸二開 -ɛm)	*am (*ap)	南甘男三談 （合盒答雜壓）	am (ap)	am (ap)	am (ap)	am (ap)	am (ap)	am (ap)	am (ap)	am (ap)	am (ap)	am (ap)	am (ap)	aŋ (aʔ)	aŋ (aʔ)	aŋ (aʔ)	aŋ (aʔ)
(Note: 凡三合 -jwom)	*uam (*uap)	犯泛範 （法）	uan (uat)	uan (uat)	uan (uat)	uan (uat)	uan (uat)	uan (uat)	uam (uap)	uam (uap)	uam (uap)	uan (uat)	uan (uat)	uan (uaʔ)	aŋ (uaʔ)	aŋ (aʔ)	aŋ (aʔ)
(Note: 侵三開 -(j)im)	*im (*ip)	今心深金音 （入及立習集）	im (ip)	im (ip)	em (ep)	im (ip)	im (ip)	im (ip)	im (ip)	im (ip)	im (ip)	iom (iop)	im (ip)	iaŋ (eʔ)	eŋ (eʔ)	iŋ (iʔ)	iŋ (iʔ)
(Note: 嚴三開 -jæm, 鹽三開 -j(i)em, 添四開 -em)	*iam (*iap)	念忝漸鹽劍 （業粒接疊涉）	iam (iap)	iam (iap)	em (ep)	iam (iap)	iam (iap)	iam (iap)	iam (iap)	iam (iap)	iam (iap)	iam (iap)	iam (iap)	iaŋ (iaʔ)	iaŋ (iaʔ)	ieŋ (ieʔ)	iaŋ (iaʔ)
—	*øm	蔘	ɯəm	əm	em (ep)	im	oŋ	om	om	iam (iap)	om	iom	oŋ	aŋ	aŋ	ieŋ (ieʔ)	iaŋ (iaʔ)
—	*øm	森	ɯəm	əm	em (ep)	im	im	om	om	iam (iap)	om	am	am	aŋ	aŋ	ieŋ (ieʔ)	iaŋ (iaʔ)

==== Finals with -ŋ/-k ====
MC	PSM	examples	Hokkien							Teochew			Lengna			Datian	Hinghwa
MC	PSM	examples	LK	NA	QZ JJ	HA	YC TA AM ZZ CT CA	ZP	YX	ST	TY	HLH	LN	JC	XQ	FL	Hinghwa
(Note: 江二開 -æwng with labials and velars; vernacular readings cognate to 東一開 -uwng)	*aŋ (*ak)	巷江空同東 （角覺六木北）	aŋ (ak)	aŋ (ak)	aŋ (ak)	aŋ (ak)	aŋ (ak)	aŋ (ak)	aŋ (ak)	aŋ (ak)	aŋ (ak)	aŋ (ak)	aŋ (ak)	aŋ (ak)	aŋ (aʔ)	aŋ (aʔ)	aŋ (aʔ)
(Note: 登一開 -ong; few 庚二開 -æng and 耕二開 -ɛng)	—	等生能僧肯 （德得刻克特）	ɯəŋ (ɯak)	əŋ (ək)	əŋ (iak)	eŋ (iak)	iŋ (ik)	ioŋ (iok)	iɛn (iɛt)	eŋ (ek)	eŋ (ek)	eŋ (ek)	in (it)	in (et)	in (eʔ)	eŋ (aʔ)	ɛŋ (ɛʔ)
(Note: 蒸三開 -ing, 庚二開 -æng, 耕二開 -ɛng, 青四開 -eng; variant (often obsolete) for 庚二合 -wæng, 登一合 -wong, and 耕二合 -wɛng)	*iŋ (*ik)	定零朋幸戥 （白的色笛魄）	iŋ (iak)	iŋ (ik)	iŋ (iak)	eŋ (iak)	iŋ (ik)	ioŋ (iok)	iɛn (iɛt)	eŋ (ek)	eŋ (ek)	eŋ (ek)	in (it)	in (et)	in (eʔ)	eŋ (aʔ)	ɛŋ (ɛʔ)
(Note: 庚三開 -jæng, 清三開 -j(i)eng)	*iŋ (*ik)	形正星京命 （食赤力飾職）	iŋ (iak)	iŋ (ik)	iŋ (iak)	eŋ (iak)	iŋ (ik)	ioŋ (iok)	iɛn (iɛt)	eŋ (ek)	eŋ (ek)	eŋ (ek)	in (it)	in (et)	in (eʔ)	eŋ (aʔ)	iŋ (iʔ)
(Note: 庚三合 -jwæng, 清三合 -jw(i)eng, 青四合 -weng)	—	永詠螢榮營 （或惑域役）	iŋ (iak)	iŋ (ik)	iŋ (iak)	eŋ (iak)	iŋ (ik)	ioŋ (iok)	iɛn (iɛt)	ioŋ (ok)	ueŋ (uek)	eŋ (ek)	in (it)	in (et)	in (eʔ)	eŋ (aʔ)	yŋ (ɛʔ, yʔ)
(Note: 庚三合 -jwæng, 清三合 -jw(i)eng, 青四合 -weng)	—	炯傾頃熲 （獲穫砉）	iŋ (iak)	iŋ (ik)	iŋ (iak)	eŋ (iak)	iŋ (ik)	ioŋ (iok)	iɛn (iɛt)	uaŋ (uak)	ueŋ (uek)	eŋ (ek)	in (it)	in (et)	in (eʔ)	eŋ (aʔ)	yŋ (ɛʔ, yʔ)

MC	PSM	examples	Hokkien						Teochew		Lengna			Datian	Hinghwa	
MC	PSM	examples	QZ JJ LK	HA	NA YC TA SX AM	ZZ CT	ZP YX	CA	ST TY	HLH	LN	JC	XQ	FL	XY	PT
(Note: vernacular readings cognate to 東三開 -juwng, 鍾三開 -jowng)	*ɯŋ (*ɯk)	龍頌湧舂弓 （綠粟玉浴竹）	iŋ (iak)	eŋ (iak)	iŋ (ik)	iŋ (ik)	—	iŋ (ik)	eŋ (ek)	eŋ (ek)	—	—	—	oŋ (oʔ)	—	—
(Note: literary readings from 東三開 -juwng, 鍾三開 -jowng)	*ioŋ (*iok)	充中種終腫 （俗陸足祝築）	ioŋ (iok)	ioŋ (iok)	ioŋ (iok)	ioŋ (iok)	ioŋ (iok)	ioŋ (iok)	oŋ (ok)	ioŋ (iok)	oŋ (ok)	ioŋ (iok)	oŋ (oʔ)	oŋ (oʔ)	yøŋ (yøʔ)	øŋ (œʔ)
(Note: literary readings from 東三開 -juwng, 鍾三開 -jowng)	*ioŋ (*iok)	恐弓恭雄庸 （玉肉蓄辱欲）	ioŋ (iok)	ioŋ (iok)	ioŋ (iok)	ioŋ (iok)	ioŋ (iok)	ioŋ (iok)	ioŋ (iok)	ioŋ (iok)	ioŋ (iok)	ioŋ (iok)	ioŋ (ioʔ)	ioŋ (oʔ)	yøŋ (yøʔ)	øŋ (œʔ)
(Note: 陽三開 -jang)	—	向想章像樣 （爵弱略藥雀）	ioŋ (iok)	ioŋ (iok)	ioŋ (iok)	iaŋ (iak)	iaŋ (iak)	iɛn (iɛt)	iaŋ (iak)	iaŋ (iak)	iaŋ (iak)	iaŋ (iak)	iaŋ (iaʔ)	iŋ (ioʔ)	yøŋ (iʔ)	yɒŋ (eʔ)

MC	PSM	examples	Hokkien		Teochew		Lengna			Datian	Hinghwa
MC	PSM	examples	gQZ	gZZ AM	ST TY	HLH	LN	JC	XQ	FL	Hinghwa
(Note: 唐一開 -ang, 東一開 -uwng, 冬一開 -owng; 江二開 -æwng with palatal sibilants; 東三開 -juwng and 鍾三開 -jowng with labials; variant (more common) in 庚二合 -wæng, 登一合 -wong, 耕二合 -wɛng)	*oŋ	公同宋通東 （族福服僕北）	oŋ (ok)	oŋ (ok)	oŋ (ok)	oŋ (ok)	oŋ (ok)	oŋ (ok)	oŋ (oʔ)	oŋ (oʔ)	ɒŋ (ɒʔ)
(Note: 唐一合 -wang, 陽三合 -jwang, 庚二合 -wæng; 江二開 -æwng with retroflex plosives)	*uoŋ	方況逛礦亡荒 （廓朔溯擴濁）	oŋ (ok)	oŋ (ok)	uaŋ (uak)	uaŋ (ok)	uaŋ (uak)	uaŋ (uak)	uaŋ (uaʔ)	uaŋ (uaʔ)	ɒŋ (ɒʔ)
—	*uoŋ	風	uaŋ	oŋ	uaŋ	uaŋ	oŋ	oŋ	oŋ	oŋ	ɒŋ
—	*iaŋ	雙	aŋ	iaŋ	aŋ	aŋ	aŋ	iaŋ	aŋ	aŋ	aŋ

==== Finals with -ʔ ====
Finals with the coda -ʔ are all used in vernacular readings. Their literary counterparts almost always have -p, -t, -k as a coda in Hokkien.

PSM	examples	Hokkien								Teochew		Lengna			Datian	Hinghwa	
PSM	examples	LK	SX	QZ TA NA YC HA	JJ AM	CT	ZZ NJ YX	ZP	CA	ST TY	HLH	LN	JC	XQ	FL	XY	PT
*aʔ	甲鴨答較	aʔ	aʔ	aʔ	aʔ	aʔ	aʔ	aʔ	aʔ	aʔ	aʔ	a	a	a	a	ɒ	ɒ
*uʔ	托拓	uʔ	uʔ	uʔ	uʔ	uʔ	uʔ	uʔ	uʔ	oʔ	oʔ	—	—	—	—	ɒ	ɒ
*oʔ	索惡學落	oʔ	oʔ	oʔ	oʔ	oʔ	oʔ	oʔ	oʔ	oʔ	oʔ	o	uo	o	o	o	o
*iʔ	鐵舌裂篾	iʔ	iʔ	iʔ	iʔ	iʔ	iʔ	iʔ	iʔ	iʔ	iʔ	i	i	i	i	i	i
*eʔ	白百客密	eʔ	eʔ	eʔ	eʔ	eʔ	ɛʔ	ɛʔ	ɛʔ	eʔ	eʔ	iɛ	e	e	a	a	a
*øʔ	雪絕	əʔ	əʔ	əʔ	eʔ	eʔ	eʔ	ɛʔ	əʔ	oʔ	oʔ, eʔ	ie	ie	ue	ue	ø	ø
*uøʔ	月說缺卜	əʔ	əʔ	əʔ	eʔ	ueʔ	ueʔ	uɛʔ	ueʔ	ueʔ	ueʔ	ue	ue	ue	ue	uoi	oe
*ueʔ	血	uiʔ	uiʔ	uiʔ	uiʔ	ueʔ	ueʔ	uɛʔ	ueʔ	ueʔ	ueʔ	ue	ue	ue	ue	e	e
*oiʔ	八	ueʔ	ueʔ	ueʔ	ueʔ	ueʔ	eʔ	ɛʔ	eʔ	oiʔ	eʔ	ie	ie	ei	e	e	e
*oiʔ	節夾截切	ɯeʔ	əeʔ	ueʔ	ueʔ	ueʔ	eʔ	ɛʔ	eʔ	oiʔ	eʔ	ie	ie	ei	e	e	e
*iaʔ	削勺食壁	iaʔ	iaʔ	iaʔ	iaʔ	iaʔ	iaʔ	iaʔ	iaʔ	iaʔ	iaʔ	a	ia	a	ia	ia	ia
*ioʔ	着腳約藥	ioʔ	ioʔ	ioʔ	ioʔ	ioʔ	ioʔ	ioʔ	ioʔ	ioʔ	ioʔ	io	io	io	io	ieu	ieu
*uaʔ	辣活末熱	uaʔ	uaʔ	uaʔ	uaʔ	uaʔ	uaʔ	uaʔ	uaʔ	uaʔ	uaʔ	ua	ua	ua	ua	ua	ua

==== Nasalized finals ====
Nasalized finals in Hokkien have two principal etymological sources.

First category includes the nasalized finals that are cognate to finals with a full nasal coda. They are used only in vernacular readings.

PSM	examples	Hokkien							Teochew		Lengna			Datian	Hinghwa	
PSM	examples	gQZ TA AM TP	KH TC	CT TN	ZZ	PH NJ ZP	YX	CA	ST KY EN TY HLH	TC	LN	JC	XQ	FL	XY	PT
*ã	三林藍衫岩	ã	ã	ã	ã	ã	ã	ã	ã	ã	ã	ã	ã	ã	ɒ̃	ɒ
*ẽ	姓病硬青生	ĩ	ẽ	ẽ	ɛ̃	ɛ̃	ĩ	ɛ̃	ẽ	ẽ	iɛ̃	ẽ	ẽ	ã	ã	a
*ĩ	天偏丸見箭	ĩ	ĩ	ĩ	ĩ	ĩ	ĩ	ĩ	ĩ	ĩ	ĩ	ĩ	in	iŋ	iŋ	iŋ
*iã	行命聲名京	iã	iã	iã	iã	iã	iã	iã	iã	iã	iã	iã	iã	iã	iã	ia
*iã	健營件贏燃	iã	iã	iã	iã	iã	iã	iã	iã	iã	iã	iã	iã	iã	yã	yɒ
*uã	泉岸煎線換	uã	uã	uã	uã	uã	uã	uã	uã	uã	uã	uã	ɔ̃	uã	yã	yɒ
*uã	單半山傘旦	uã	uã	uã	uã	uã	uã	uã	uã	uã	uã	uã	ɔ̃	uã	uã	ua
*iõ	丈場張章香	iũ	iũ	iɔ̃	iɔ̃	iũ	iũ	iõ	iõ	iẽ	iõ	iõ	iŋ	ŋ	iũ	iau

PSM	examples	Hokkien									Teochew		Lengna			Datian	Hinghwa	
PSM	examples	LK	gQZ	TA	AM	CT	ZZ	ZP	YX	CA	ST TC	TY HLH	LN	JC	XQ	FL	XY	PT
*õi	反	uĩ	uĩ	ãi	iŋ	an	iŋ	ioŋ	an	iŋ	oĩ	ãi	ĩ	an	in	iŋ	ĩ	e
*õi	先前閑肩千	ɯĩ	uĩ	ãi	iŋ	an	iŋ	ioŋ	ian	iŋ	oĩ	ãi	ĩ	an	in	iŋ	ĩ	e
*ãi	指	ɯĩ	uĩ	ãi	ãi	ãi	ai	ai	ai	ai	ãi	ãi	ai	ai	iɛ	ɛ	ai	ai
*uẽ	關	ɯĩ	uĩ	uĩ	uĩ	uãi	uã	uɛ̃	uẽ	uɛ̃	uẽ	uẽ	uɛ̃	uẽ	uɛ̃	uã	uĩ	ue
*uẽ	橫	ɯĩ	uĩ	uãi	uãi	uãi	uã	uɛ̃	uẽ	uɛ̃	uẽ	uẽ	uɛ̃	uẽ	uɛ̃	uã	uã	ua
*uõi	縣懸	ɯĩ	uĩ	uãi	uãi	uan	uan	uan	uan	uan	uĩ	uãi	uĩ	uan	uãi	uŋ	ĩ	e

PSM	examples	Hokkien				Teochew				Lengna			Datian	Hinghwa	
PSM	examples	gQZ TA AM	CT	gZZ	CA	ST TC	KY EN	TY	HLH	LN	JC	XQ	FL	XY	PT
*õ	唐堂向糖	ŋ	ɔ̃	ŋ	ŋ	ɯŋ	ɯŋ	ŋ	ŋ	õ	ŋ	ŋ	ŋ	ŋ	uŋ
*uĩ	全酸鑽斷頓	ŋ	ŋ	uĩ	ŋ	ɯŋ	ɯŋ	ŋ	uĩ	ĩ	uĩ	ãi	uŋ	ỹ	ø
*uĩ	光廣	ŋ	ŋ	uĩ	uĩ	ɯŋ	ɯŋ	ŋ	uĩ	uĩ	uĩ	uãi	uŋ	ŋ	uŋ
*uĩ	勸穿磚管傳	ŋ	ŋ	uĩ	uĩ	ɯŋ	ɯŋ	ŋ	uĩ	uĩ	uĩ	ãi	uŋ	uĩ	ue
*uĩ	門問飯晚	ŋ	ŋ	uĩ	uĩ	uŋ	ɯŋ	ŋ	uĩ	uĩ	uĩ	ãi	uŋ	uĩ	ue
*uĩ	遠園荒	ŋ	ŋ	uĩ	uĩ	ŋ	ŋ	ŋ	uĩ	uĩ	uĩ	uãi	uŋ	uĩ	ue

Another type of nasalized finals is used in syllables with nasal initials that did not undergo denasalization. Such syllables may be alternatively analyzed as having a plain, non-nasalized final and a nasal initial. Although this analysis is not typical for Hokkien, it is more common in the descriptions of Teochew (e.g. the Peng'im romanization would spell 迷 as mi5, and 棉 as min5, even though both are actually /mĩ⁵⁵/, or mî in Pe̍h-ūe-jī). This type of nasal finals occurs in both literary and vernacular readings.

While finals like /ĩ/, /ɛ̃/, /ã/, /iũ/, /uã/ may be induced by both contexts, finals /ãi/, /ãu/, /iãu/, /õ~ɔ̃/ are used exclusively in syllables that did not have an etymological nasal coda (see the section on the open-vowel finals for examples). Additionally, depending on the dialect, words like 糜 'congee' and 妹 'sister' may have finals /uẽ/ (in some Hokkien dialects: Changtai, Chawan, Southern Taiwan, as well as in Teochew) or /uãi/ (in urban Zhangzhou). Teochew preserves some other combinations of nasal initials and finals not found in Hokkien, such as 雅 ngiá 'beautiful' and 語 ngú 'language' (the latter only in the Teoyeo dialect of Teochew).

Occasionally, nasal finals occur in characters that never had a nasal coda or a nasal initial, e.g. 打 táⁿ, 鼻 phīⁿ, 怕 phàⁿ.

==== Other correspondences ====
The following correspondences are less regular and common, and as such, they are illustrated by specific characters in which they occur.

character	Hokkien												Teochew			Lengna		Datian	Hinghwa	
character	LK	QZ	NA HA	JJ	YC	TA	AM	CT	ZZ	ZP	YX	CA	ST TC	TY	HLH	LN	JC	FL	XY	PT
徛 'to stand'	^{⊆}kʰɯa	^{⊆}kʰa	^{⊆}kʰia	^{⊆}kʰia	kʰia^{⊇}	kʰia^{⊇}	kʰia^{⊇}	kʰia^{⊇}	kʰia^{⊇}	kʰia^{⊇}	kʰia^{⊇}	kʰia^{⊇}	^{⊆}kʰia	^{⊆}kʰia	^{⊆}kʰia	^{⊆}kʰiua	kʰia^{⊇}	^{⊆}kʰia	kʰya^{⊇}	kʰyɒ^{⊇}
囝 'child'	^{⊂}kɯã	^{⊂}kã	^{⊂}kã	^{⊂}kã	^{⊂}kiã	^{⊂}kiã	^{⊂}kiã	^{⊂}kiã	^{⊂}kiã	^{⊂}kiã	^{⊂}kiã	^{⊂}kiã	^{⊂}kiã	^{⊂}kiã	^{⊂}kiã	^{⊂}kiuã	^{⊂}kiã	^{⊂}kiã	^{⊂}kyã	^{⊂}kyɒ
揭 'to hold up'	kɯaʔ_{⊇}	kaʔ_{⊇}	kaʔ_{⊇}	kaʔ_{⊇}	kiaʔ_{⊇}	kiaʔ_{⊇}	kiaʔ_{⊇}	giaʔ_{⊇}	giaʔ_{⊇}	_{⊆}gia	kiaʔ_{⊇}	kiaʔ_{⊇}	kiaʔ_{⊇}	kiaʔ_{⊇}	kiaʔ_{⊇}	_{⊆}kʰia	_{⊆}kʰia	_{⊆}kʰia	^{⊂}kya	^{⊂}kyɒ
畫 'to draw'	ɯeʔ_{⊇}	ueʔ_{⊇}	ueʔ_{⊇}	ueʔ_{⊇}	ueʔ_{⊇}	uiʔ_{⊇}	uiʔ_{⊇}	uaʔ_{⊇}	uaʔ_{⊇}	uɛʔ_{⊇}	uɛʔ_{⊇}	uɛʔ_{⊇}	ueʔ_{⊇}	ueʔ_{⊇}	ueʔ_{⊇}	_{⊂}guɛ	_{⊂}gue	_{⊂}bua	hɛʔ_{⊇}	hɛʔ_{⊇}
厝 'home'	tsʰu^{⊃}	tsʰu^{⊃}	tsʰu^{⊃}	tsʰu^{⊃}	tsʰu^{⊃}	tsʰu^{⊃}	tsʰu^{⊃}	tsʰu^{⊃}	tsʰu^{⊃}	su^{⊃}	tsʰu^{⊃}	tsʰu^{⊃}	tsʰu^{⊃}	tsʰu^{⊃}	tsʰu^{⊃}	tsʰi^{⊃}	tsʰu^{⊃}	tsʰu^{⊃}	tsʰou^{⊃}	tsʰou^{⊃}
每 'every'	^{⊂}muĩ	^{⊂}muĩ	^{⊂}muĩ	^{⊂}muĩ	^{⊂}muĩ	^{⊂}muĩ	^{⊂}muĩ	^{⊂}muẽ	^{⊂}bue	^{⊂}buɛ	^{⊂}bue	^{⊂}bue	^{⊂}muẽ	^{⊂}muẽ	^{⊂}muẽ	^{⊂}bue	^{⊂}bie	^{⊂}bue	^{⊂}puoi	^{⊂}pue
梅 'plum' _{梅花}	_{⊆}muĩ	_{⊆}muĩ	_{⊆}muĩ	_{⊆}muĩ	_{⊆}muĩ	_{⊆}muĩ	_{⊆}muĩ	_{⊆}bue	_{⊆}bue	_{⊆}buɛ	_{⊆}bue	_{⊆}bue	_{⊆}bue	_{⊆}bue	_{⊆}bue	^{⊆}muĩ	_{⊆}bie	_{⊆}bue	_{⊆}puoi	_{⊆}pue
梅 'plum' _{梅仔}	_{⊆}m	_{⊆}m	_{⊆}m	_{⊆}m	_{⊆}m	_{⊆}m	_{⊆}m	_{⊆}m	_{⊆}m	_{⊆}m	_{⊆}m	_{⊆}m	—	—	—	_{⊆}m	_{⊆}hm	_{⊆}mŋ	—	—
媒 'medium' _{媒介}	_{⊆}muĩ	_{⊆}muĩ	_{⊆}muĩ	_{⊆}muĩ	_{⊆}muĩ	_{⊆}muĩ	_{⊆}muĩ	_{⊆}bue	_{⊆}bue	_{⊆}buɛ	_{⊆}bue	_{⊆}bue	_{⊆}bue	_{⊆}bue	_{⊆}bue	_{⊆}gue	_{⊆}bie	_{⊆}bue	_{⊆}puoi	_{⊆}pue
媒 'matchmaker' _{媒儂}	_{⊆}m	_{⊆}m	_{⊆}m	_{⊆}m	_{⊆}hm	_{⊆}hm	_{⊆}hm	_{⊆}m	_{⊆}bun	_{⊆}bun	_{⊆}bun	_{⊆}bun	_{⊆}bue	_{⊆}bue	_{⊆}bue	_{⊆}gue	_{⊆}bie	_{⊆}bue	_{⊆}puoi	_{⊆}pue
耳 'ear' _{木耳}	^{⊂}nĩ	^{⊂}nĩ	^{⊂}nĩ	^{⊂}nĩ	^{⊂}nĩ	^{⊂}nĩ	^{⊂}nĩ	^{⊂}nĩ	^{⊂}dzĩ	^{⊂}dzi	^{⊂}dzi	^{⊂}dzi	^{⊂}dzɯ	^{⊂}dzu	^{⊂}dzi	^{⊂}nĩ	^{⊂}nĩ	^{⊂}zi	^{⊂}tsi	^{⊂}tsi
耳 'ear' _{耳仔}	^{⊆}hi	^{⊆}hi	^{⊆}hi	^{⊆}hi	hi^{⊇}	hi^{⊇}	hi^{⊇}	hi^{⊇}	hi^{⊇}	hĩ^{⊇}	hĩʔ_{⊇}	hĩ^{⊇}	^{⊆}hĩ	^{⊆}hĩ	^{⊆}hĩ	^{⊆}nĩ	hi^{⊇}	^{⊆}hiŋ	hi^{⊇}	hi^{⊇}
瓦 'small pieces' _{瓦解}	^{⊂}ua	^{⊂}ua	^{⊂}ua	^{⊂}ua	^{⊂}ua	^{⊂}ua	^{⊂}ua	^{⊂}ua	^{⊂}ua	^{⊂}ua	^{⊂}ua	^{⊂}ua	_{⊂}ua	_{⊂}ua	^{⊂}ua	^{⊂}gua	^{⊂}gua	?	^{⊂}ua	^{⊂}ua
瓦 'tile' _{厝瓦}	^{⊆}hia	^{⊆}hia	^{⊆}hia	^{⊆}hia	hia^{⊇}	hia^{⊇}	hia^{⊇}	hia^{⊇}	hia^{⊇}	hia^{⊇}	hiaʔ_{⊃}	hia^{⊇}	^{⊆}hia	^{⊆}hia	^{⊆}hia	^{⊆}guɛ	gue^{⊇}	^{⊆}bua	hya^{⊇}	hyɒ^{⊇}
個 'CL for people'	_{⊆}ge	_{⊆}ge	_{⊆}ge	_{⊆}ge	_{⊆}ge	_{⊆}ge	_{⊆}e	_{⊆}e	_{⊆}e	_{⊆}e	_{⊆}ge	_{⊆}gə	_{⊆}kai	_{⊆}kai	_{⊆}kai	_{⊆}kie	_{⊆}kai	_{⊆}ge	_{⊆}ke	_{⊆}ke
兮/其 'POS'	e	e	e	e	e	e	e	e	e	e	e	e	_{⊆}kai	_{⊆}kai	_{⊆}kai	_{⊆}ie	_{⊆}kai	_{⊆}ge	ɛ	ɛ

=== Tone correspondences ===
locality	平 'level'		上 'rising'		去 'departing'		入 'entering'		total
locality	陰 'dark'	陽 'light'	陰 'dark'	陽 'light'	陰 'dark'	陽 'light'	陰 'dark'	陽 'light'	total
Tn̂g-khiⁿ (Note: in central Anxi; previously known as 長坑鄉, now renamed as 長卿鎮, with the same pronunciation in Hokkien (Tn̂g-khiⁿ) but different pronunciations in Mandarin (長坑 Changkeng vs. 長卿 Changqing).)	13	35	33	53	21	22	32	5	8
Dehua	13	44	42	35	21	陰去	42	35	7
Hui'an	33~44	214	53	22	31	陰去	54	24	7
Quanzhou, Nan'an	33~44	214	554	22	31	陰去	54	24	7
Jinjiang, Shishi	33	214	554	陰平	31	陰去	54	24	6
Tong'an, Xiang'an	44	214	31	陽去	11	22	32	4	7
Quemoy	44	214	53	陽去	12	22	32	4	7
Amoy, Taiwan, Changtai, Yongchun	44	214	53	陽去	21	22~33	32	4	7
Zhangzhou, Longhai, Pinghe, Nanjing	34	213	53	陽去	31	22~33	32	121	7
Zhangpu, Yunxiao, Dongshan	44	212	53	陽去	21	22~33	32	213	7
Chawan	55	213	53	陽去	21	22~33	32	213	7
Swatow, Teochew	33	55	53	35	212	22~21	32	54	8
Puning	34	44	53	23	31	42	32	54	8
Teoyeo (old)	21	44	551	陰去	53	42	43	45	7
Teoyeo (new)	31	33	55~35	陰去	52	43	32	45	7
Haimen	31	44	551	陰平	51	441	43	45	7
Lengna	334	11	21	52	213	55	5	32	8
Zhangping	24	22	53	陽去	21	55	21	53	7
Datian	33	24	53	55	31	陰去	3	5	7
Hinghwa	533	13	453	陽去	42	21	2	4	7
