= Nanzhao (disambiguation) =

Nanzhao (南詔), polity that flourished in south-west China and Southeast Asia during the 8th and 9th centuries.

Nanzhao may also refer to:

- Nanzhao County (南召县), of Nanyang (南阳), Henan (河南省), China
- Nanzhao, Anhui (南照镇), a town in Yingshang County, Anhui (安徽省), China
- Nanzhao, Fujian (南诏), a town in Zhao'an County (诏安县), Fujian (福建省), China
