= Yunling =

Yunling may refer to the following locations in China:

- Yunling Mountains (云岭山), the namesake of Yunnan
- Yunling, the mausoleum of Lady Gouyi
- Yunling, Anhui (云陵镇), town in Jing County, Anhui, China
- Yunling, Fujian (云陵镇), town in Fujian, China
