= Voiceless bilabial plosive =

Consonantal sound represented by ⟨p⟩ in IPA

p
- IPA number: 101

Audio sample
- source · help

Encoding
- Entity (decimal): &#112;
- Unicode (hex): U+0070
- X-SAMPA: p
- Braille: ⠏ (braille pattern dots-1234)
Image

A voiceless bilabial plosive or stop is a type of consonantal sound used in most spoken languages. It is familiar to English-speakers as the "p" sound in "spit". The symbol in the International Phonetic Alphabet that represents this sound is ⟨p⟩.

== Features ==
Sagittal section of a voiceless bilabial plosive

Features of a voiceless bilabial plosive:

- Its manner of articulation is occlusive, which means it is produced by obstructing airflow in the vocal tract. Since the consonant is also oral, with no nasal outlet, it is a plosive.
- Its place of articulation is bilabial, which means it is articulated with both lips.
- Its phonation is voiceless, which means it is produced without vibrations of the vocal cords. In some languages the vocal cords are actively separated, so it is always voiceless; in others the cords are lax, so that it may take on the voicing of adjacent sounds.
- It is an oral consonant, which means that air is not allowed to escape through the nose.
- Because the sound is not produced with airflow over the tongue, the median–lateral dichotomy does not apply.
- Its airstream mechanism is pulmonic, which means it is articulated by pushing air only with the intercostal muscles and abdominal muscles, as in most speech sounds.

== Occurrence ==
Research has shown that incidental learning positively impacts the acquisition of the /p/ sound for Arabic speakers and other EFL learners. This is particularly interesting given that the stop /p/ is missing from about 10% of languages that have a /b/. (See voiced velar stop for another such gap.) This is an areal feature of the circum-Saharan zone (Africa north of the equator plus the Arabian Peninsula). It is not known how old this areal feature is, and whether it might be a recent phenomenon due to Arabic as a prestige language, or whether Arabic was itself affected by a more ancient areal pattern. It is found in other areas as well; for example, Fijian, Onge, and many Papuan languages have /b/ but no /p/.

Nonetheless, the /p/ sound is very common cross-linguistically. Most languages have at least a plain /p/, and some distinguish more than one variety. Many Indo-Aryan languages, such as Hindustani, have a two-way contrast between the aspirated /pʰ/ and the plain /p/ (also transcribed as [p˭] in extensions to the IPA).

=== Examples ===
Language		Word	IPA	Meaning	Notes
Abkhaz		Аԥсны/Aṕsny	[apʰsˈnɨ]	'Abkhazia'	
Adyghe		паӏо / پائۆ / paio	[paːʔʷa]	'hat'	
Arabic	Algerian	پاپيش/pāpīš	[paːpiːʃ]	'beautiful girls'	
Arabic	Hejazi	بول/پول/pōl	[po̞ːl]	'Paul'	Only used in loanwords, transcribed and pronounced as ⟨ب⟩ by many speakers.
Arabic	Egyptian	پورسعيد/Por Saʿīd	[porsæˈʕiːd]	'Port Said'	Used in loanwords or names, commonly substituted with /b/.
Armenian	Eastern	պապիկ/papik	[papik]	'grandpa'	Contrasts with aspirated form
Assyrian		ܦܬܐ pata	[pata]	'face'	
Basque		harrapatu	[(h)arapatu]	'to catch'	
Bengali		পথ	[pɔtʰ]	'road'	Contrasts with aspirated form. See Bengali phonology
Breton		penn	[pen]	'head'	
Catalan		por	[ˈpɔ(ɾ)]	'fear'	See Catalan phonology
Chuvash		путене/putene	[putʲɛ'nɛ]	'quail'	
Czech		pes	[pɛs]	'dog'	See Czech phonology
Danish	Standard	bog	[ˈpɔ̽wˀ]	'book'	Usually transcribed in IPA with ⟨b̥⟩ or ⟨b⟩. It may be partially voiced [b] in the intervocalic position. It contrasts with aspirated form, which is usually transcribed in IPA with ⟨pʰ⟩ or ⟨p⟩. See Danish phonology
Dutch		plicht	[plɪxt]	'duty'	See Dutch phonology
English		pack	[pʰæk]	'pack'	See English phonology
Esperanto		tempo	[ˈtempo]	'time'	See Esperanto phonology
Filipino		pato	[paˈto]	'duck'	
Finnish		pappa	[ˈpɑpːɑ]	'grandpa'	See Finnish phonology
French		pomme	[pɔm]	'apple'	See French phonology
Gan Chinese	Nanchangnese	把戲	[pa˨˩ ɕi˩]	'magic'	Contrasts with aspirated form. See Nanchangnese phonology
German		Pack	[pʰak]	'pile'	See Standard German phonology
Greek		πόδι / pódi	[ˈpo̞ði]	'leg'	See Modern Greek phonology
Gujarati		પગ/pag	[pəɡ]	'foot'	See Gujarati phonology
Hakka Chinese	Meizhounese	河壩 / ho² ba⁴	[ho˩ pa˥]	'river'	Contrasts with aspirated form. See Meizhounese phonology
Hebrew		פּקיד/pakid	[paˈkid]	'clerk'	See Modern Hebrew phonology
Hindustani	Urdu	پل/pal	[pəl]	'moment'	Contrasts with aspirated form. See Hindustani phonology
Hindustani	Hindi	पल / pal	[pəl]	'moment'	Contrasts with aspirated form. See Hindustani phonology
Hmong	White Hmong	𖬒𖬶𖬪𖬵 / pov	[po˨˦]	'to throw'	
Hungarian		pápa	[ˈpaːpɒ]	'pope'	See Hungarian phonology
Italian		papà	[paˈpa]	'dad'	See Italian phonology
Japanese		ポスト / posuto	[posɯto]	'mailbox'	See Japanese phonology
Kabardian		пэ / پە / pė	[pa]	'nose'	
Khmer		ពន្យល់ / pônyól	[pɔnjɔl]	'to explain'	See Khmer phonology
Korean		빛 / bit	[pit̚]	'light'	See Korean phonology
Kurdish	Northern	پۆر / por	[ˈpʰoːɾ]	'hair'	See Kurdish phonology
Kurdish	Central	پیرۆزە / píroze	[pʰiːɾoːzæ]	'lammergeier'	See Kurdish phonology
Kurdish	Southern	پۊنگه / pûûnga	[pʰʉːŋa]	'pennyroyal'	See Kurdish phonology
Lakota		púza	[ˈpʊza]	'dry'	
Lithuanian		pastatas	[ˈpaːstɐtɐs]	'building'	See Lithuanian phonology
Luxembourgish		bëlleg	[ˈpələɕ]	'cheap'	Less often voiced [b]. It is usually transcribed /b/, and contrasts with voiceless aspirated form, which is usually transcribed /p/. See Luxembourgish phonology
Macedonian		пее/pee	[pɛː]	'sing'	See Macedonian phonology
Malay		panas	[pänäs]	'hot'	Often unreleased in syllable codas so /p/ is read as [p̚] instead in lembap [ləmbap̚] 'damp'. See Malay phonology
Malayalam		പത്ത്/pathu	[pɐt̪ːɨ]	'ten'	See Malayalam phonology
Maltese		aptit	[apˈtit]	'appetite'	
Mandarin	Dungan	бонцу	[pɑŋ˨˦ t͡sʰou˨˦]	'to assist'	Contrasts with aspirated form. See Dungan phonology
Mandarin	Nanjingnese	半大子	[pɑŋ˦ tɑ˦ tsz̩]	'teenager'	Contrasts with aspirated form. See Nanjingnese phonology
Mandarin	Sichuanese	不算事 / bu² suan⁴ si⁴	[pu˨˩ suan˨˩˧ sz̩˨˩˧]	'ineffective'	Contrasts with aspirated form. See Sichuanese phonology
Mandarin	Standard	爆炸 / bàozhà	[pɑʊ˥˩ tʂa˥˩]	'to explode'	Contrasts with aspirated form. See Standard Chinese phonology
Mandarin	Xi'annese	迸	[pəŋ˦]	'mattock'	Contrasts with aspirated form. See Xi'annese phonology
Marathi		पाऊस/paa'uus/pā'ūs	[pɑːˈuːs]	'rain'	See Marathi phonology
Min Chinese	Hokkien	咖啡 / ko-pi	[ko˨ pi˦]	'coffee'	Contrasts with aspirated form. See Hokkien phonology
Min Chinese	Teochew	僻 / piah^{4}	[pʰiaʔ˨]	'remote'	Contrasts with aspirated form. See Teochew phonology
Min Chinese	Fuzhounese	白撞 / băh-dâung	[paʔ˨˩ lɑuŋ˨˦˨]	'trespasser'	Contrasts with aspirated form. See Fuzhounese phonology
Mutsun		po·čor	[poːt͡ʃor]	'a sore'	
Nepali		पिता/pitā	[pit̪ä]	'father'	See Nepali phonology
Norwegian		pappa	[pɑpːɑ]	'dad'	See Norwegian phonology
Odia		ପଥର/pathara	[pɔʈʰɔrɔ]	'stone'	Contrasts with aspirated form.
Pashto		پانير/pa'nir	[pɑˈnir]	'cheese'	
Persian		پول/pul	[pul]	'money'	
Pirahã		pibaóí	[ˈpìbàóí̯]	'otter'	
Polish		pas	[päs]	'belt'	See Polish phonology
Portuguese		pai	[paj]	'father'	See Portuguese phonology
Punjabi		ਪੱਤਾ/ پتا / pattā	[pət̪ːäː]	'leaf'	
Romanian		pas	[pas]	'step'	See Romanian phonology
Russian		плод/plod	[pɫot̪]	'fruit'	Contrasts with palatalized form. See Russian phonology
Scottish Gaelic	Most dialects	Alba	[al̪ˠapə]	'Scotland'	Often transcribed as /b̥/. See Scottish Gaelic phonology
Serbo-Croatian		пиће / piće	[pǐːt͡ɕě]	'drink'	See Serbo-Croatian phonology
Slovak		pes	[pɛ̝s]	'dog'	
Slovene		pes	[pə̂s̪]	'dog'	See Slovene phonology
Spanish		peso	[ˈpe̞so̞]	'weight'	See Spanish phonology
Swahili		pombe / پٗونْبٖ	[ˈpoᵐbɛ]	'beer'	
Swedish		apa	[ˈɑːˌpa]	'monkey'	See Swedish phonology
Telugu		పని	[pani]	'work'	Contrasts with aspirated form in old Telugu. However aspirated form is almost always pronounced as voiceless labiodental fricative in modern Telugu.
Thai		แป้ง/paeng	[pɛ̂ːŋ]	'powder'	See Thai phonology
Toki Pona		pilin	[pilin]	'feeling'	
Tsez		пу/pu	[pʰu]	'side'	Contrasts with ejective form.
Turkish		kap	[ˈkʰɑp]	'pot'	See Turkish phonology
Ukrainian		павук/pavuk	[pɐˈβ̞uk]	'spider'	See Ukrainian phonology
Vietnamese		nhíp	[ɲip˧ˀ˥]	'tweezers'	See Vietnamese phonology
Welsh		siop	[ʃɔp]	'shop'	See Welsh phonology
West Frisian		panne	[ˈpɔnə]	'pan'	
Wu Chinese	Shanghainese	司必靈 / sy-piq-lin	[sz̩˧ pi̯ɪʔ˦ lin˨]	'spring'	Contrasts with aspirated form. See Shanghainese phonology
Wu Chinese	Suzhounese	標緻 / piau¹-tsyu⁵	[pi̯æ˥ tsz̩ʷ˨˩]	'pretty'	Contrasts with aspirated form. See Suzhounese phonology
Wu Chinese	Wenzhounese	眼淚八汁 / nga⁴-lei⁶-po⁷-tsai⁷	[ŋa lei̯ po˥˧ tsai̯˩˨]	'tear'	Contrasts with aspirated form. See Wenzhounese phonology
Yi		ꀠ / ba	[pa˧]	'exchange'	Contrasts aspirated and unaspirated forms.
Yue Chinese	Cantonese	豬頭丙 / zyu¹ tau⁴ bing²	[t͡ʃyː˥ tʰɐu̯˨˩ pɪŋ˧˥]	'blockhead'	Contrasts with aspirated form. See Cantonese phonology
Yue Chinese	Taishanese	白	[pak̚˧˩]	'white'	Contrasts with aspirated form. See Taishanese phonology
Central Alaskan Yup'ik		panik	[panik]	'daughter'	
Zapotec	Tilquiapan	pan	[paŋ]	'bread'	

== See also ==
- List of phonetics topics

== Notes ==
Place →	Labial					Coronal										Dorsal					Laryngeal			
Manner ↓	Bilabial		Labiodental		Linguolabial		Dental		Alveolar		Postalveolar		Retroflex		(Alveolo-)palatal		Velar		Uvular		Pharyngeal/epiglottal		Glottal	
Nasal	m̥	m	ɱ̊	ɱ		n̼	n̪̊	n̪	n̥	n	n̠̊	n̠	ɳ̊	ɳ	ɲ̊	ɲ	ŋ̊	ŋ	ɴ̥	ɴ				
Plosive	p	b	p̪	b̪	t̼	d̼	t̪	d̪	t	d			ʈ	ɖ	c	ɟ	k	ɡ	q	ɢ	ʡ		ʔ	
Sibilant affricate							t̪s̪	d̪z̪	ts	dz	t̠ʃ	d̠ʒ	tʂ	dʐ	tɕ	dʑ								
Non-sibilant affricate	pɸ	bβ	p̪f	b̪v			t̪θ	d̪ð	tɹ̝̊	dɹ̝	t̠ɹ̠̊˔	d̠ɹ̠˔			cç	ɟʝ	kx	ɡɣ	qχ	ɢʁ	ʡʜ	ʡʢ	ʔh	
Sibilant fricative							s̪	z̪	s	z	ʃ	ʒ	ʂ	ʐ	ɕ	ʑ								
Non-sibilant fricative	ɸ	β	f	v	θ̼	ð̼	θ	ð	θ̠	ð̠	ɹ̠̊˔	ɹ̠˔	ɻ̊˔	ɻ˔	ç	ʝ	x	ɣ	χ	ʁ	ħ	ʕ	h	ɦ
Approximant		β̞		ʋ				ð̞		ɹ		ɹ̠		ɻ		j		ɰ						˷
Tap/flap		ⱱ̟		ⱱ					ɾ̥	ɾ			ɽ̊	ɽ						ɢ̆		ʡ̆		
Trill	ʙ̥	ʙ							r̥	r		r̠	ɽ̊r̥	ɽr					ʀ̥	ʀ	ʜ	ʢ		
Lateral affricate									tɬ	dɮ			tꞎ	d𝼅	c𝼆	ɟʎ̝	k𝼄	ɡʟ̝						
Lateral fricative							ɬ̪		ɬ	ɮ			ꞎ	𝼅	𝼆	ʎ̝	𝼄	ʟ̝						
Lateral approximant								l̪	l̥	l		l̠	ɭ̊	ɭ	ʎ̥	ʎ	ʟ̥	ʟ		ʟ̠				
Lateral tap/flap									ɺ̥	ɺ			𝼈̊	𝼈		ʎ̆		ʟ̆						

		BL	LD	D	A	PA	RF	P	V	U
Implosive	Voiced	ɓ			ɗ		ᶑ	ʄ	ɠ	ʛ
Implosive	Voiceless	ɓ̥			ɗ̥		ᶑ̊	ʄ̊	ɠ̊	ʛ̥
Ejective	Stop	pʼ			tʼ		ʈʼ	cʼ	kʼ	qʼ
Ejective	Affricate		p̪fʼ	tθʼ	tsʼ	tʃʼ	tʂʼ	tɕʼ	kxʼ	qχʼ
Ejective	Fricative	ɸʼ	fʼ	θʼ	sʼ	ʃʼ	ʂʼ	ɕʼ	xʼ	χʼ
Ejective	Lateral affricate				tɬʼ			c𝼆ʼ	k𝼄ʼ	q𝼄ʼ
Ejective	Lateral fricative				ɬʼ					
Click (top: velar; bottom: uvular)	Tenuis	kʘ qʘ		kǀ qǀ	kǃ qǃ		k𝼊 q𝼊	kǂ qǂ		
Click (top: velar; bottom: uvular)	Voiced	ɡʘ ɢʘ		ɡǀ ɢǀ	ɡǃ ɢǃ		ɡ𝼊 ɢ𝼊	ɡǂ ɢǂ		
Click (top: velar; bottom: uvular)	Nasal	ŋʘ ɴʘ		ŋǀ ɴǀ	ŋǃ ɴǃ		ŋ𝼊 ɴ𝼊	ŋǂ ɴǂ	ʞ	
Click (top: velar; bottom: uvular)	Tenuis lateral				kǁ qǁ					
Click (top: velar; bottom: uvular)	Voiced lateral				ɡǁ ɢǁ					
Click (top: velar; bottom: uvular)	Nasal lateral				ŋǁ ɴǁ					
