= Meiling, Zhao'an County =

Meiling 梅岭镇
- Town
- Location in Fujian Meiling (China)
- Coordinates: 23.6571°N 117.2594°E
- Country: People's Republic of China
- Province: Fujian
- Prefecture-level city: Zhangzhou
- County: Zhao'an County

Area
  - Total: 31.90 km^{2} (12.32 sq mi)

Population (2020 census)
  - Total: 31,601
  - Density: 990.6/km^{2} (2,566/sq mi)
- Time zone: UTC+8 (China Standard)

Meiling (Chinese: 梅岭; pinyin: Méilǐng; Pe̍h-ōe-jī: Bôe-niá) is a town under the administration of Zhao'an County, Fujian, China. As of 2018, it has 15 villages under its administration.
