= Voiceless velar plosive =

Consonantal sound represented by ⟨k⟩ in IPA

k
- IPA number: 109

Audio sample
- source · help

Encoding
- Entity (decimal): &#107;
- Unicode (hex): U+006B
- X-SAMPA: k
- Braille: ⠅ (braille pattern dots-13)
Image

A voiceless velar plosive or stop is a type of consonantal sound used in almost all spoken languages. It is familiar to English-speakers as the "k" sound in "skip". The symbol in the International Phonetic Alphabet that represents this sound is ⟨k⟩.

A [k] sound is a very common sound cross-linguistically. Most languages have at least a plain [k], and some distinguish more than one variety. Many languages also have a two-way contrast between aspirated and plain [k]. Only a few languages lack a voiceless velar plosive, e.g. North Azerbaijani, Tahitian, and Mongolian.

Some languages have a voiceless pre-velar or post-palatal plosive, which is articulated slightly more front compared with the place of articulation of the prototypical velar plosive, though not as front as the prototypical palatal plosive. See Voiceless palatal plosive § Post-palatal for more information.

Conversely, some languages have a voiceless post-velar plosive, which is articulated slightly behind the place of articulation of the prototypical velar plosive, though not as back as the prototypical uvular plosive.

== Features ==
Sagittal section of a voiceless velar plosive

Features of a voiceless velar stop:

- Its manner of articulation is occlusive, which means it is produced by obstructing airflow in the vocal tract. Since the consonant is also oral, with no nasal outlet, it is a plosive.
- Its place of articulation is velar, which means it is articulated with the back of the tongue (the dorsum) at the soft palate.
- Its phonation is voiceless, which means it is produced without vibrations of the vocal cords. In some languages the vocal cords are actively separated, so it is always voiceless; in others the cords are lax, so that it may take on the voicing of adjacent sounds.
- It is an oral consonant, which means that air is not allowed to escape through the nose.
- It is a median consonant, which means it is produced by directing the airstream down the midline of the tongue, rather than to the sides.
- Its airstream mechanism is pulmonic, which means it is articulated by pushing air only with the intercostal muscles and abdominal muscles, as in most speech sounds.

== Occurrence ==
Language		Word	IPA	Meaning	Notes
Abkhaz		ақалақь/ak̇halak̇h'	[ˈakalakʲ]	'the city'	See Abkhaz phonology
Adyghe	Shapsug	кьэт/k′ėt	[kʲat]	'chicken'	Dialectal; corresponds to [t͡ʃ] in other dialects.
Adyghe	Temirgoy	пскэн/pskėn	[pskan]	'to cough'	Dialectal; corresponds to [t͡ʃ] in other dialects.
Ahtna		gistaann	[kɪstʰɐːn]	'six'	
Aleut		kiikax̂	[kiːkaχ]	'cranberry bush'	
Arabic	Modern Standard	ك‍‍تب/kataba	[ˈkatabɐ]	'he wrote'	See Arabic phonology
Armenian	Eastern	քաղաք/ k'aġak'/k'aghak	[kʰɑˈʁɑkʰ]	'town'	Contrasts with unaspirated form.
Assamese		কম/kom	[kɔm]	'less'	
Assyrian		ܟܬܒ̣ܐ ctava	[ktava]	'book'	Used in most varieties, with the exception of the Urmia and Nochiya dialects where it corresponds to [t͡ʃ].
Basque		katu	[kat̪u]	'cat'	
Bengali		কম/kom	[kɔm]	'less'	Contrasts with aspirated form. See Bengali phonology
Bulgarian		как/kak	[kak]	'how'	See Bulgarian phonology
Cantonese		家/gā	[kaː˥]	'home'	See Cantonese phonology
Cantonese		橋/桥/kìuh	[kʰi:u˨˩]	'bridge'	See Cantonese phonology
Catalan		cors	[ˈkɔɾs]	'hearts'	See Catalan phonology
Chuvash		кукка	[ku'kːɑ]	'mother's brother'	
Czech		kost	[kost]	'bone'	See Czech phonology
Danish	Standard	gås	[ˈkɔ̽ːs]	'goose'	Usually transcribed in IPA with ⟨ɡ̊⟩ or ⟨ɡ⟩. Contrasts with aspirated form, which is usually transcribed in IPA with ⟨kʰ⟩ or ⟨k⟩. See Danish phonology
Dutch		koning	[ˈkoːnɪŋ]	'king'	See Dutch phonology
English		kiss	[kʰɪs]	'kiss'	See English phonology
Esperanto		rakonto	[raˈkonto]	'tale'	See Esperanto phonology
Estonian		kõik	[kɤik]	'all'	See Estonian phonology
Filipino		kuto	[ˈkuto]	'lice'	
Finnish		kakku	[kɑkːu]	'cake'	See Finnish phonology
French		cabinet	[kabinɛ]	'office'	See French phonology
Georgian		ქვა/kva	[kʰva]	'stone'	
German		Käfig	[ˈkʰɛːfɪç]	'cage'	See Standard German phonology
Greek		καλόγερος / kalógeros	[kaˈlo̞ʝe̞ro̞s̠]	'monk'	See Modern Greek phonology
Gujarati		કાંદો/kaṃde	[kɑːnd̪oː]	'onion'	See Gujarati phonology
Hebrew	Modern	כִּנּוֹר / kinór	[kinˈor]	'violin'	See Modern Hebrew phonology
Hebrew	Samaritan	ࠃࠓࠊ / derek	[derek]	'path'	
Hiligaynon		kadlaw	[kad̪law]	'laugh'	
Hindustani		काम / ک‍‍ام	[kɑːm]	'work'	Contrasts with aspirated form. See Hindustani phonology
Hokkien		歌/koa	[kua˧˨]	'song'	See Hokkien phonology
Hokkien		區/区/khu	[kʰu˧˨]	'district'	See Hokkien phonology
Hmong	White Hmong	𖬀𖬶 / keeb	[kẽ˦]	'origin', 'beginning', or 'male name'	
Hungarian		akkor	[ɒkkor]	'then'	See Hungarian phonology
Ibaloi		Koma		'rubber'	
Italian		casa	[ˈkäːzä]	'house'	See Italian phonology
Japanese		鞄 / kaban	[kabaɴ]	'handbag'	See Japanese phonology
Kagayanen		kalag	[kað̞aɡ]	'spirit'	
Khmer		កម្ពុជា / kâmpŭchéa	[kampuciːə]	'Cambodia'	See Khmer phonology
Korean		감자 / kamja	[kamdʑa]	'potato'	See Korean phonology
Lakota		kimímela	[kɪˈmɪmela]	'butterfly'	
Luxembourgish		geess	[ˈkeːs]	'goat'	Less often voiced [ɡ]. It is usually transcribed in IPA as ⟨ɡ⟩, and it contrasts with aspirated form, which is usually transcribed ⟨k⟩. See Luxembourgish phonology
Macedonian		кој	[kɔj]	'who'	See Macedonian phonology
Marathi		कवच	[kəʋət͡s]	'armour'	Contrasts with aspirated form. See Marathi phonology
Malay		kaki	[käki]	'leg'	Unreleased in syllable codas in some words, See Malay phonology
Malayalam		കഥ/katha	[kət̪ʰə]	'story'	See Malayalam phonology
Mandarin		高/gāo	[kɑʊ˥]	'high'	See Mandarin phonology
Mandarin		考/kǎo	[kʰɑʊ˨˩˦]	'roast' (v.)	See Mandarin phonology
Nepali		केरा	[keɾä]	'banana'	Contrasts with aspirated form. See Nepali phonology
Norwegian		kake	[kɑːkə]	'cake'	See Norwegian phonology
Odia		କାମ/kāma	[kämɔ]	'work'	Contrasts with aspirated form.
Pashto		كال/kal	[kɑl]	'year'	
Persian		کارد/kārd	[kɑrd]	'knife'	
Polish		buk	[ˈbuk]	'beech tree'	See Polish phonology
Portuguese		corpo	[ˈkoɾpu]	'body'	See Portuguese phonology
Punjabi		ਕਰ /کر / kar	[kəɾ]	'do'	Contrasts with aspirated form.
Romanian		când	[ˈkɨnd]	'when'	See Romanian phonology
Russian		короткий/korotkij	[kɐˈrotkʲɪj]	'short'	See Russian phonology
Serbo-Croatian		кост / kost	[kȏːs̪t̪]	'bone'	See Serbo-Croatian phonology
Slovak		kosť	[kɔ̝sc]	'bone'	See Slovak phonology
Slovene		kost	[ˈkôːs̪t̪]	'bone'	Aspirated before close vowels. See Slovene phonology
Spanish		casa	[ˈkäsä]	'house'	See Spanish phonology
Swedish		ko	[ˈkʰuː]	'cow'	See Swedish phonology
Sylheti		ꠇꠤꠔꠣ/kita	[kɪt̪à]	'what'	
Tamil		கல்	[kəl]	'rock'	See Tamil phonology
Telugu		కాకి/kāki	[kāki]	'crow'	Contrasts with aspirated form.
Thai		ไก่/kị̀	[kaj˨˩]	'chicken'	Contrasts with an aspirated form.
Toki Pona		kulupu	[kulupu]	'group'	Sometimes aspirated.
Turkish		kulak	[kʰuɫäk]	'ear'	See Turkish phonology
Ubykh		кауар/kawar	[kawar]	'slat'	Found mostly in loanwords. See Ubykh phonology
Ukrainian		колесо/koleso	[ˈkɔɫɛsɔ]	'wheel'	See Ukrainian phonology
Vietnamese		cam	[kam]	'orange'	See Vietnamese phonology
Welsh		calon	[kʰalɔn]	'heart'	See Welsh phonology
West Frisian		keal	[kɪəl]	'calf'	See West Frisian phonology
Yi		ꇰ / ge	[kɤ˧]	'foolish'	Contrasts aspirated and unaspirated forms.
Zapotec	Tilquiapan	canza	[kanza]	'walking'	

== See also ==
- Hard and soft C
- Index of phonetics articles

== Notes ==
Place →	Labial					Coronal										Dorsal					Laryngeal			
Manner ↓	Bilabial		Labiodental		Linguolabial		Dental		Alveolar		Postalveolar		Retroflex		(Alveolo-)palatal		Velar		Uvular		Pharyngeal/epiglottal		Glottal	
Nasal	m̥	m	ɱ̊	ɱ		n̼	n̪̊	n̪	n̥	n	n̠̊	n̠	ɳ̊	ɳ	ɲ̊	ɲ	ŋ̊	ŋ	ɴ̥	ɴ				
Plosive	p	b	p̪	b̪	t̼	d̼	t̪	d̪	t	d			ʈ	ɖ	c	ɟ	k	ɡ	q	ɢ	ʡ		ʔ	
Sibilant affricate							t̪s̪	d̪z̪	ts	dz	t̠ʃ	d̠ʒ	tʂ	dʐ	tɕ	dʑ								
Non-sibilant affricate	pɸ	bβ	p̪f	b̪v			t̪θ	d̪ð	tɹ̝̊	dɹ̝	t̠ɹ̠̊˔	d̠ɹ̠˔			cç	ɟʝ	kx	ɡɣ	qχ	ɢʁ	ʡʜ	ʡʢ	ʔh	
Sibilant fricative							s̪	z̪	s	z	ʃ	ʒ	ʂ	ʐ	ɕ	ʑ								
Non-sibilant fricative	ɸ	β	f	v	θ̼	ð̼	θ	ð	θ̠	ð̠	ɹ̠̊˔	ɹ̠˔	ɻ̊˔	ɻ˔	ç	ʝ	x	ɣ	χ	ʁ	ħ	ʕ	h	ɦ
Approximant		β̞		ʋ				ð̞		ɹ		ɹ̠		ɻ		j		ɰ						˷
Tap/flap		ⱱ̟		ⱱ					ɾ̥	ɾ			ɽ̊	ɽ						ɢ̆		ʡ̆		
Trill	ʙ̥	ʙ							r̥	r		r̠	ɽ̊r̥	ɽr					ʀ̥	ʀ	ʜ	ʢ		
Lateral affricate									tɬ	dɮ			tꞎ	d𝼅	c𝼆	ɟʎ̝	k𝼄	ɡʟ̝						
Lateral fricative							ɬ̪		ɬ	ɮ			ꞎ	𝼅	𝼆	ʎ̝	𝼄	ʟ̝						
Lateral approximant								l̪	l̥	l		l̠	ɭ̊	ɭ	ʎ̥	ʎ	ʟ̥	ʟ		ʟ̠				
Lateral tap/flap									ɺ̥	ɺ			𝼈̊	𝼈		ʎ̆		ʟ̆						

		BL	LD	D	A	PA	RF	P	V	U
Implosive	Voiced	ɓ			ɗ		ᶑ	ʄ	ɠ	ʛ
Implosive	Voiceless	ɓ̥			ɗ̥		ᶑ̊	ʄ̊	ɠ̊	ʛ̥
Ejective	Stop	pʼ			tʼ		ʈʼ	cʼ	kʼ	qʼ
Ejective	Affricate		p̪fʼ	tθʼ	tsʼ	tʃʼ	tʂʼ	tɕʼ	kxʼ	qχʼ
Ejective	Fricative	ɸʼ	fʼ	θʼ	sʼ	ʃʼ	ʂʼ	ɕʼ	xʼ	χʼ
Ejective	Lateral affricate				tɬʼ			c𝼆ʼ	k𝼄ʼ	q𝼄ʼ
Ejective	Lateral fricative				ɬʼ					
Click (top: velar; bottom: uvular)	Tenuis	kʘ qʘ		kǀ qǀ	kǃ qǃ		k𝼊 q𝼊	kǂ qǂ		
Click (top: velar; bottom: uvular)	Voiced	ɡʘ ɢʘ		ɡǀ ɢǀ	ɡǃ ɢǃ		ɡ𝼊 ɢ𝼊	ɡǂ ɢǂ		
Click (top: velar; bottom: uvular)	Nasal	ŋʘ ɴʘ		ŋǀ ɴǀ	ŋǃ ɴǃ		ŋ𝼊 ɴ𝼊	ŋǂ ɴǂ	ʞ	
Click (top: velar; bottom: uvular)	Tenuis lateral				kǁ qǁ					
Click (top: velar; bottom: uvular)	Voiced lateral				ɡǁ ɢǁ					
Click (top: velar; bottom: uvular)	Nasal lateral				ŋǁ ɴǁ					
