= Guanbei =

Guanbei 官陂镇
- Town
- Location in Fujian Guanbei (China)
- Coordinates: 24°01′03″N 117°04′02″E
- Country: People's Republic of China
- Province: Fujian
- Prefecture-level city: Zhangzhou
- County: Zhao'an
- Elevation: 116 m (381 ft)
- Time zone: UTC+8 (China Standard)
- Postal code: 363500
- Area code: 0596

Guanbei (Chinese: 官陂; pinyin: Guānbēi; Pe̍h-ōe-jī: Koaⁿ-pi) is a town of Zhao'an County in southernmost Fujian province, China, near the border with Guangdong and 35 kilometres (22 mi) north-northwest of the county seat. As of 2011, It has 17 villages under its administration.
