= Yunling, Fujian =

Town in Yunxiao, Fujian, China

Yunling 云陵镇
- Town
- Location in Fujian
- Coordinates: 23.9632°N 117.33838°E
- Country: People's Republic of China
- Province: Fujian
- Prefecture-level city: Zhangzhou
- County: Yunxiao
- Time zone: UTC+8 (China Standard)

Yunling (simplified Chinese: 云陵镇; traditional Chinese: 雲陵鎮; pinyin: Yúnlíng Zhèn; Pe̍h-ōe-jī: În-lêng-tìn) is the chief town of Yunxiao County, in Zhangzhou, Fujian. It is the seat of Yunxiao's government, Lower People's Court and local branches of CPC and PSB.

== Culture & Tourism ==
Yunling (called by Chinese convention Zhangpu, 漳浦) lies on the banks of the Zhangjiang River (漳江) for which the old prefecture Zhangzhou fu and the modern municipality of Zhangzhou are named.
