= Yunxiao =

Yunxiao County 云霄县 Yunsiao; Yünsiao; Yünhsiao
- County
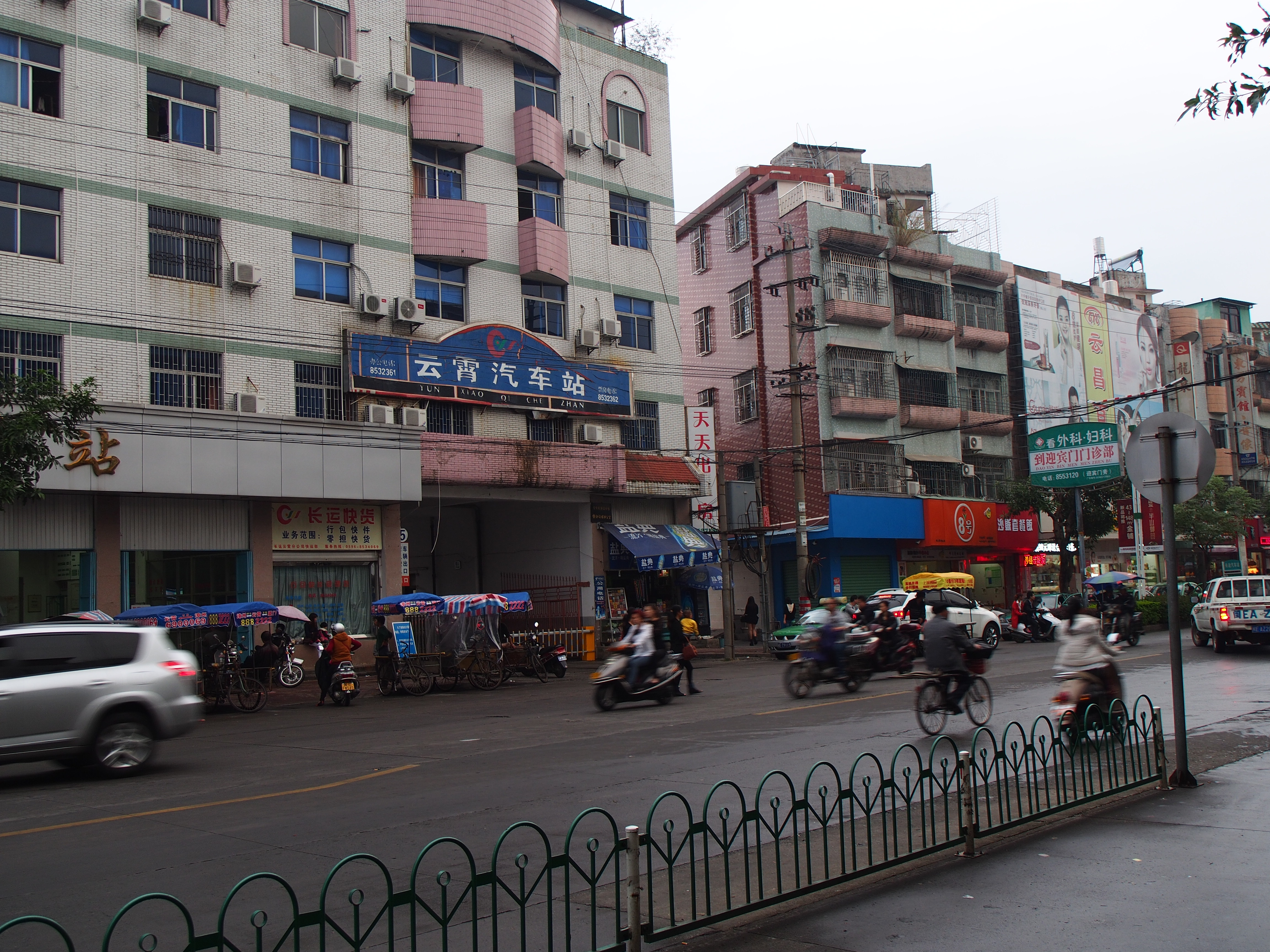

- Location of the seat in Fujian
- Coordinates (Yunxiao NPC): 23°57′28″N 117°20′23″E
- Country: People's Republic of China
- Province: Fujian
- Prefecture-level city: Zhangzhou

Area
  - Total: 1,069 km^{2} (413 sq mi)

Population (2020)
  - Total: 411,558
  - Density: 385.0/km^{2} (997.1/sq mi)
- Time zone: UTC+8 (China Standard)
- Postal code: 363300
- Area code: 0596

Yunxiao County (simplified Chinese: 云霄县; traditional Chinese: 雲霄縣; pinyin: Yúnxiāo Xiàn; Pe̍h-ōe-jī: Ûn-sio-kōan) is a county of Zhangzhou prefecture level city, in the south of Fujian province, People's Republic of China. The county had a population of 411,558 according to the 2020 Census. The county spans an area of 1,069 square kilometres (413 sq mi).

The county postcode is 363300 and its telephone area code is 0596.

== History ==
Yunxiao County, located on the Zhangjiang River on the way from Zhangpu County to Dongshan Island, was the earliest seat of the government of Zhangzhou.

== Economy ==
Minerals such as gold, zinc, silver and aluminum, granite, porcelain clay, and sea salt are mined in the county.

Major agricultural products in Yunxiao County include seed oil, sugar, vegetables, tea, and fruits, particularly loquat and lychee.

As of 2009, the county is also the source of half of China's production of counterfeit cigarettes, producing about 400 billion cigarettes a year (whereas all legal cigarette business is state-owned and state-controlled). Yunxiao is reported to contain some 200 illicit cigarette factories beneath buildings or in the hills.

== Administrative divisions ==
Yunxiao County oversees six towns, three townships, and two Development Zones (开发区). The county government is seated in the town of Yunling.

=== Towns ===
Yunxiao County oversees six towns (镇; zhèn; tìn). Of the six towns, three of which lie on National Route 324, and the other three all lie between this route and coast. The county executive, legislature and judiciary is seated at Yunling (云陵), together with the CPC and PSB branches.

- Yunling (云陵; În-lêng)
- Chendai (Mandarin 陈岱; Chéndài, Hokkien 陈埭; Tân-tē)
- Dongxia (东厦; Tang-hēe)
- Pumei (莆美; Po͘-bóe)
- Lieyu (Mandarin 列屿; Lièyǔ, Hokkien 笠屿; Le̍h-sī)
- Huotian (火田; Hóe-chhân)

=== Townships ===
Yunxiao County oversees three townships (乡; xiāng; hioⁿ).

- Xiahe Township (下河; Ēe-hô)
- Mapu Township (马铺; Bée-pho͘)
- Heping Township (和平; Hô-pêng)

=== Development Zones ===
The county is home to two development zones.

- Changshan Overseas Chinese Economic Development Zone (常山华侨经济开发区; Siâng-soaⁿ Hôa-kiâu Keng-chè Khai-hoat-khi, originally 双山; Siang-soaⁿ)
- Yunling Industrial Development Zone (云陵工业开发区; În-lêng Kang-gia̍p Khai-hoat-khi)

== Climate ==
Climate data for Yunxiao, elevation 23 m (75 ft), (1991–2020 normals, extremes 1981–2010)
Month	Jan	Feb	Mar	Apr	May	Jun	Jul	Aug	Sep	Oct	Nov	Dec	Year
Record high °C (°F)	29.7 (85.5)	31.1 (88.0)	33.4 (92.1)	34.4 (93.9)	36.2 (97.2)	36.9 (98.4)	39.7 (103.5)	38.7 (101.7)	36.9 (98.4)	34.9 (94.8)	33.2 (91.8)	30.2 (86.4)	39.7 (103.5)
Mean daily maximum °C (°F)	19.3 (66.7)	19.6 (67.3)	21.8 (71.2)	25.7 (78.3)	28.9 (84.0)	31.4 (88.5)	33.5 (92.3)	33.2 (91.8)	32.0 (89.6)	29.0 (84.2)	25.5 (77.9)	21.2 (70.2)	26.8 (80.2)
Daily mean °C (°F)	14.4 (57.9)	14.9 (58.8)	17.1 (62.8)	21.1 (70.0)	24.7 (76.5)	27.4 (81.3)	28.9 (84.0)	28.5 (83.3)	27.4 (81.3)	24.4 (75.9)	20.7 (69.3)	16.4 (61.5)	22.2 (71.9)
Mean daily minimum °C (°F)	11.3 (52.3)	12.0 (53.6)	14.2 (57.6)	18.0 (64.4)	21.7 (71.1)	24.7 (76.5)	25.6 (78.1)	25.4 (77.7)	24.2 (75.6)	20.8 (69.4)	17.3 (63.1)	13.1 (55.6)	19.0 (66.3)
Record low °C (°F)	2.5 (36.5)	1.8 (35.2)	3.3 (37.9)	7.4 (45.3)	13.9 (57.0)	16.3 (61.3)	21.2 (70.2)	22.0 (71.6)	17.7 (63.9)	12.0 (53.6)	5.8 (42.4)	0.0 (32.0)	0.0 (32.0)
Average precipitation mm (inches)	41.3 (1.63)	63.4 (2.50)	102.9 (4.05)	141.8 (5.58)	225.7 (8.89)	340.7 (13.41)	251.3 (9.89)	321.8 (12.67)	165.1 (6.50)	46.5 (1.83)	41.3 (1.63)	43.7 (1.72)	1,785.5 (70.3)
Average precipitation days (≥ 0.1 mm)	7.2	10.3	13.1	13.0	15.4	18.4	13.3	15.3	10.0	3.5	5.0	6.0	130.5
Average relative humidity (%)	73	76	77	78	80	82	79	80	75	68	70	70	76
Mean monthly sunshine hours	133.7	103.2	103.3	118.1	133.5	149.1	225.9	196.2	175.3	183.3	155.7	143.9	1,821.2
Percentage possible sunshine	40	32	28	31	32	37	54	49	48	52	48	44	41
Source: China Meteorological Administration

== Culture ==
The famous Weihui Temple (云霄威惠庙), built to honor Chen Yuanguang, the founder of Zhangzhou, is situated in the county.

In the main hall is a statue of Chen Yuanguang in red armour and official crown with his heavy mustache and red face. Sculptures of his parents and wife are also located in the temple, hung on stone pillars detailed with praise for Chen inside the hall. The most festive period for the temple is on Chen's birthday (the 15th day of the second lunar month) and the anniversary of his death (the 5th day of the 11th lunar month). On both occasions the temple is packed with people burning incense and full-length operas that are performed in the square. Effigies of Chen and other deities are paraded down the streets to celebrate the occasions.

== Transportation ==
National Highway 324, and the Zhangzhou-Zhao'an portion of the G15 Shenyang–Haikou Expressway both run through the county.
