= Zhao'an County =

Zhao'an County 诏安县
- County
- Location of the seat in Fujian
- Coordinates: 23°42′42″N 117°10′31″E
- Country: People's Republic of China
- Province: Fujian
- Prefecture-level city: Zhangzhou

Area
  - Total: 1,027 km^{2} (397 sq mi)

Population (2020 census)
  - Total: 560,969
  - Density: 546.2/km^{2} (1,415/sq mi)
- Time zone: UTC+8 (China Standard)

Zhao'an (simplified Chinese: 诏安; traditional Chinese: 詔安; pinyin: Zhào'ān; Pe̍h-ōe-jī: Chiàu-an-koān) is a county in the municipal region of Zhangzhou, and the southernmost administrative division of Fujian province, People's Republic of China, bordering Guangdong province to the west.

== History ==
=== Qing dynasty to the Republic of China ===
In May 1907, county officials arrested, on suspicion of piracy, the local leaders of a movement called the "White Fan". They escaped, rallied their followers, captured the top mandarin, and killed the sheriff. 30,000 strong, they menaced Chaozhou. The anti-dynastic rebels had been gaining in popular support in the Minnan-speaking south of Fujian since 1906; local government soldiers would not fight them.

Qing troops were dispatched from Fuzhou and Guangzhou, capitals of the two affected provinces. Engaging the rebels at the end of the month, they killed 600. Some of the citizens of Zhangzhou fu felt themselves to be in danger, and came down to Xiamen, where the United States Navy gunboat Helena floated in Xiamen Bay.

== Population ==
The population in Zhao'an are Minnan and Hakka.

== Administration ==
=== Towns (镇, zhen) ===
- Sidu (四都; Sì-to͘)
- Meiling (梅岭; Bôe-niá)
- Qiaodong (桥东; Kiô-tang)
- Nanzhao (南诏; Lâm-chiàu)
- Taiping (太平; Thài-pêng)
- Xiage (Mandarin 霞葛; Xiágé, Hokkien 下葛; Ēe-koah)
- Guanbei (官陂; Koaⁿ-pi)
- Xiuzhuan (秀篆; Siù-thoān)
- Shenqiao (深桥; Chhim-kiô)

=== Townships (乡, xiang) ===
- Meizhou (梅洲; Bôe-chiu)
- Jinxing (金星; Kim-chheⁿ)
- Xitan (西潭; Sai-thâm)
- Baiyang (白洋; Pe̍eh-iôⁿ)
- Jianshe (建设; Kiàn-siat)
- Hongxing (红星; Âng-chheⁿ)

== Climate ==
Climate data for Zhao'an, elevation 38 m (125 ft), (1991–2020 normals, extremes 1981–2010)
Month	Jan	Feb	Mar	Apr	May	Jun	Jul	Aug	Sep	Oct	Nov	Dec	Year
Record high °C (°F)	29.8 (85.6)	30.2 (86.4)	31.1 (88.0)	33.6 (92.5)	34.1 (93.4)	36.5 (97.7)	39.2 (102.6)	37.8 (100.0)	38.3 (100.9)	35.0 (95.0)	33.2 (91.8)	29.8 (85.6)	39.2 (102.6)
Mean daily maximum °C (°F)	19.2 (66.6)	19.6 (67.3)	21.7 (71.1)	25.5 (77.9)	28.6 (83.5)	30.8 (87.4)	32.6 (90.7)	32.5 (90.5)	31.6 (88.9)	29.1 (84.4)	25.7 (78.3)	21.4 (70.5)	26.5 (79.8)
Daily mean °C (°F)	14.1 (57.4)	14.7 (58.5)	17.0 (62.6)	21.0 (69.8)	24.6 (76.3)	27.2 (81.0)	28.5 (83.3)	28.2 (82.8)	27.2 (81.0)	24.3 (75.7)	20.5 (68.9)	16.1 (61.0)	22.0 (71.5)
Mean daily minimum °C (°F)	10.5 (50.9)	11.6 (52.9)	13.9 (57.0)	17.8 (64.0)	21.6 (70.9)	24.5 (76.1)	25.4 (77.7)	25.2 (77.4)	23.9 (75.0)	20.4 (68.7)	16.5 (61.7)	12.3 (54.1)	18.6 (65.5)
Record low °C (°F)	−0.8 (30.6)	1.8 (35.2)	1.9 (35.4)	8.1 (46.6)	12.8 (55.0)	17.1 (62.8)	21.1 (70.0)	21.5 (70.7)	17.4 (63.3)	10.0 (50.0)	3.9 (39.0)	−1.3 (29.7)	−1.3 (29.7)
Average precipitation mm (inches)	39.0 (1.54)	52.0 (2.05)	92.4 (3.64)	125.4 (4.94)	174.0 (6.85)	257.4 (10.13)	201.6 (7.94)	272.0 (10.71)	148.0 (5.83)	31.8 (1.25)	37.2 (1.46)	39.7 (1.56)	1,470.5 (57.9)
Average precipitation days (≥ 0.1 mm)	6.9	9.6	11.9	12.2	14.6	17.2	12.7	14.0	9.4	3.4	4.7	6.3	122.9
Average relative humidity (%)	76	78	79	80	82	85	82	83	78	70	73	73	78
Mean monthly sunshine hours	149.3	114.1	115.0	128.0	147.6	167.7	239.2	211.7	200.0	211.2	176.2	164.6	2,024.6
Percentage possible sunshine	44	35	31	33	36	41	58	53	55	59	54	50	46
Source: China Meteorological Administration
