= Nanzhao, Fujian =

Nanzhao 南诏镇
- Town
- Location in Fujian Nanzhao (China)
- Coordinates: 23°42′53″N 117°10′45″E
- Country: People's Republic of China
- Province: Fujian
- Prefecture-level city: Zhangzhou
- District: Zhao'an
- Elevation: 14 m (46 ft)
- Time zone: UTC+8 (China Standard)
- Postal code: 363500
- Area code: 0596

Nanzhao (simplified Chinese: 南诏; traditional Chinese: 南詔; pinyin: Nánzhào; Pe̍h-ōe-jī: Lâm-chiàu) is a town Zhao'an County, in southern Fujian province, China.

== See also ==
- List of township-level divisions of Fujian
