= Middle Chinese finals =

Phonological rime in Middle Chinese

In Middle Chinese, the phonological system of medieval rime dictionaries and rime tables, the final is the rest of the syllable after the initial consonant. This analysis is derived from the traditional Chinese fanqie system of indicating pronunciation with a pair of characters indicating the sounds of the initial and final parts of the syllable respectively, though in both cases several characters were used for each sound. Reconstruction of the pronunciation of finals is much more difficult than for initials due to the combination of multiple phonemes into a single class, and there is no agreement as to their values. Because of this lack of consensus, understanding of the reconstruction of finals requires delving into the details of rime tables and rime dictionaries.

== Finals and rhyme classes ==
Each final is contained within a single rhyme class, but a rhyme class may contain more than one final:

- Several rhyme classes contain both "open" and "closed" finals, thought to be distinguished by the absence or presence of a medial /w/.
- Six rhyme classes contain finals that appear to be distinguished according to the absence or presence of medial /j/: 戈 (closed) -wa, -jwa (rows 1 and 3); 麻 -æ, -jæ (rows 2 and 3); 庚 -æng, -jæng (rows 2 and 3); 陌 -æk, -jæk (rows 2 and 3); 東 -uwng, -juwng (rows 1 and 3); 屋 -uwk, -juwk (rows 1 and 3).
- Some so-called chóngniǔ rhyme classes contain two finals after a labial, velar and laryngeal initials, one placed in row 3 and the other in row 4. (The finals are not distinguished after dental or sibilant initials, and scholars disagree on which of the two finals these should be allocated to.) In all such cases, the paired finals have identical outcomes in all modern Chinese dialects as well as in Sino-Japanese borrowings, and are generally palatalized; with sporadic exceptions. However, in Sino-Vietnamese and Sino-Korean only the row-4 finals have such palatalization. Karlgren ignored the difference, but all modern linguists consider the distinction important, though they do not agree on its realization. Li's and Baxter's transcriptions adopt a convention of using /ji/ the row-4 finals in contrast to /j/ or /i/ for the row-3 finals.

== Classes of finals ==
Karlgren noticed that classes of finals from the rime dictionaries were placed in different rows of the rime tables. As three classes of final were confined to the first, second and fourth rows respectively, he named them finals of divisions I, II and IV. The remaining finals he called "division-III finals" because they occurred in the third row of the tables. Some of these (the "pure" or "independent" division-III finals) occurred only in that row, while others (the "mixed" finals) could also occur in the second or fourth rows with some initials. Karlgren disregarded the chongniu distinction, but later workers have emphasized its importance. Li Rong, in a systematic comparison of the rhyme tables with a recently discovered early edition of the Qieyun, identified seven classes of finals. The table below lists the combinations of initial and final classes that occur in the Qieyun, with the row of the rime tables in which each combination was placed:

| | | div. I | div. II | "division-III" finals | | | | div. IV |
| | | div. I | div. II | indep. | mixed | chongniu | | div. IV |
|---|---|---|---|---|---|---|---|---|
| Labials | | 1 | 2 | 3 | 3 | 3 | 4 | 4 |
| Dental | stops | 1 | | | | | | 4 |
| Retroflex | stops | | 2 | | 3 | 3 | | |
| Lateral | | 1 | | | 3 | 3 | | 4 |
| Dental | sibilants | 1 | | | 4 | 4 | | 4 |
| Palatal | sibilants | | | | 3 | 3 | | |
| Retroflex | sibilants | | 2 | | 2 | 2 | | |
| Velars | | 1 | 2 | 3 | 3 | 3 | 4 | 4 |
| Laryngeals | | 1 | 2 | 3 | 3 | 3 | 4 | 4 |

The mixed and chongniu finals, though designated as division-III finals, are spread across rows 2 and 4 as well as row 3 of the tables. To handle these cases, a distinction is made between the row that the homophone class is placed in and the "division" of its final. This article distinguishes rows by Arabic numerals 1 2 3 4 and divisions by Roman numerals I II III IV. In addition, chóngniǔ finals in division III are notated in the table of final outcomes below as III/3 or III/4, depending on the row in which they occur.

== Significance of the division ==
There are correspondences between certain divisions and the presence or absence of medial glides in later dialects, in ways that differ depending on the class of the initial (e.g. velar, labial, retroflex, etc.). There are also clear co-occurrence restrictions between initials and divisions, in that initials from certain of these same classes can occur with finals only from certain divisions. The LMC authors of this system appear to have been aware of these classes of initials, and seem to have determined the separation into divisions partly on the basis of the co-occurrence relationships and partly on the medial glides, although it is debated how the exact classification was made. It is important to remember that the authors of this system were attempting to use LMC phonology to reconstruct EMC phonology (although they probably thought of it more in terms of trying to harmonize the way that words were normally pronounced with the rather different system of rhymes and homophones as laid out in the Qieyun).

The clearest difference is between division III and other divisions, with division III generally corresponding to palatal initials and/or finals with palatal (i.e. high-front) vowels or glides. In addition, divisions I and IV allow exactly the same set of initials in EMC, suggesting that the distinction between the two postdates the EMC period. Division-IV syllables are commonly thought to reflect a diphthong containing a vocalic glide /i/ in LMC, corresponding to an EMC mid-front monophthong, variously reconstructed as /ɛ/, /e/ or ɪ. Beyond this, there is no consensus.

Karlgren, and many authors following him, suggest that neither divisions I nor II had any medial other than /w/ or /u/, with division I corresponding to back vowels and division II to front vowels. Some authors have suggested that division II corresponded not so much to front vowels as to centralized vowels. Many authors have recently suggested that division-II syllables consistently had a medial /r/ in Old Chinese, although this appeared to have already disappeared by EMC, so it's unclear exactly how this would have been carried forward into LMC. (Some have suggested that the system of divisions dates back at least to the time of the Qieyun (c. 600 AD), and reflects a medial /ɣ/ present very early on in the EMC period.)

== List of finals ==
The following table lists Early Middle Chinese (EMC) reconstructed "finals" (i.e. all of the syllable other than the initial consonant), according to different authors. It also lists the corresponding Late Middle Chinese (LMC) outcomes according to Pulleyblank. The table does not explicitly list finals ending in /p/, /t/ or /k/ (the so-called "entering tone" syllables), but these can easily be derived by substituting /p/ for /m/, /t/ for /n/, and /k/ for /ŋ/. Some columns are not strictly in IPA.

Some LMC outcomes are conditioned by the EMC initials, which are represented using the following codes:

- G = guttural (velar or laryngeal, i.e. a back consonant)
- P = labial (includes labiodental)
- PG = labial or guttural (i.e. a grave consonant)
- A = acute consonant (anything not in PG)
- SR = EMC retroflex sibilant
- ST = alveolar sibilant
- M = /m/
- RXLʔ = EMC retroflex, EMC palatal sibilant, /l/ or /ʔ/

The rhyme groups (攝) are given per Yunjing, and the rhyme classes consist of Qieyun rhyme name, division number (一 to 四), and rounding (開 or 合). Division-III rhymes may have the letter m after them when belonging to "mixed division-III", or letters A and B indicating rhyme doublets, otherwise they are "pure" division-III rhymes.

| rhyme group | rhyme class | Karlgren | Li Rong | Wang Li | Baxter | Pan Wuyun | Zhengzhang | Zhu Jianing | Pulleyblank (Note: The table uses the notation in Pulleyblank (1991), which differs in some ways from Pulleyblank (1984).) | | Abraham Y.S. Chan | |
| rhyme group | rhyme class | Karlgren | Li Rong | Wang Li | Baxter | Pan Wuyun | Zhengzhang | Zhu Jianing | EMC | LMC | Jinling | Luoyang |
|---|---|---|---|---|---|---|---|---|---|---|---|---|
| 果 | 歌一開 | ɑ | ɑ | ɑ | a | ɑ | ɑ | ɑ | a [ɑ] | a [ɑ], Pua [ɑ] | ɑ | ɐ |
| 果 | 戈三開m | i̯ɑ | iɑ | ĭɑ | ja | i̯ɑ | ɨɑ | jɑ | ɨa [ɨɑ] | ia [iɑ] | ɑ | œ |
| 果 | 戈一合 | uɑ | uɑ | uɑ | wa | ʷɑ | uɑ | uɑ | wa [wɑ] | ua [uɑ] | wɑ | wɐ |
| 果 | 戈三合m | i̯wɑ | iuɑ | ĭuɑ | jwa | ʷi̯ɑ | ɨuɑ | juɑ | ua [uɑ] | ya [yɑ] | wɑ | wœ |
| 假 | 麻二開 | a | a | a | æ | ɰæ | ɣa | a | aɨ (ɛɨ) | aː [ɑː], Gjaː [Gjɑː] | æ | ɛ |
| 假 | 麻三開m | i̯a | ia | ĭa | jæ | iæ | ia | ja | ia [iɑ] | ia [iɑ] | jæ | jɛ |
| 假 | 麻二合 | wa | ua | ĭwa | wæ | ʷɰæ | ɣua | ua | waɨ (wɛɨ) | waː [wɑː] | wæ | wɛ |
| 遇 | 模一合 | uo | o | u | u | u̯o | uo | u | ɔ | uə̆ [uɔ] | u | ə |
| 遇 | 魚三合m | i̯wo | iɔ | ĭo | jo | iɤ | ɨʌ | jo | ɨə̆ | iə̆ [iɛ], SRəə̆ [SRɤ] (yə̆ [yɛ], SRuə̆ [SRuɔ]) | œ | ø |
| 遇 | 虞三合m | i̯u | io | ĭu | ju | iu̯o̝ | ɨo | ju | uə̆ | yə̆ [yɛ], SRuə̆ [SRuɔ] | ø | ø |
| 蟹 | 咍一開 | ɑ̌i | ɒi | ɒi | oj | o̝i | ʌi | ɒi | əj | aj | əj | əj |
| 蟹 | 泰一開 | ɑi | ɑi | ɑi | ajH | ɑi | ɑi | ɒi | aj | aj | ɑj | ɐj |
| 蟹 | 皆二開 | ə̆i | ɛi | ɐi | ɛj | ɰɛi | ɣɛi | ai | əɨj | aːj, Gjaːj | ɑj | ɛj |
| 蟹 | 佳二開 | ai | ɛ | ai | ɛ (ɛɨ) | ɰɛ | ɣɛ | æ | aɨj | aːj, Gjaːj | ɛ | ɛj |
| 蟹 | 夬二開 | ai | ai | æi | æjH | ɰæi | ɣai | ɐi | aɨj(s) | aːj, Gjaːj | æj | ɛj |
| 蟹 | 祭三開A | i̯ɛi | jɛi | ĭɛi | jiejH | iᴇi | iᴇi | jæi | jiaj | PGjiaj | jej | jej |
| 蟹 | 祭三開B | i̯ɛi | iɛi | ĭɛi | jejH | ɻiᴇi | ɣiᴇi | jæi | iaj | iaj | ej | ej |
| 蟹 | 廢三開 | i̯æi | iɐi | ĭɐi | jojH | iai | ɨɐi | jɐi | ɨaj | iaj | øj | øj |
| 蟹 | 齊四開 | iei | ei | iei | ej | ei | ei | iei | ɛj | PGjiaj, Aiaj | ɐj | ɪj |
| 蟹 | 灰一合 | uɑ̌i | uɒi | uɒi | woj | u̯oi | uʌi | uɒi | wəj | uaj | ʏj | ʏj |
| 蟹 | 泰一合 | wɑi | uɑi | uɑi | wajH | ʷɑi | uɑi | uɒi | waj | uaj | wɑj | wɐj |
| 蟹 | 皆二合 | wə̆i | uɛi | wɐi | wɛj | ʷɰɛi | ɣuɛi | uai | wəɨj | waːj | wɑj | wɛj |
| 蟹 | 佳二合 | wai | uɛ | wai | wɛ (wɛɨ) | ʷɰɛ | ɣuɛ | uæ | waɨj | waːj | wɛ | wɛj |
| 蟹 | 夬二合 | wai | uai | wæi | wæjH | ʷɰæi | ɣuai | uɐi | waɨj(s) | waːj | wæj | wɛj |
| 蟹 | 祭三合A | i̯wɛi | juɛi | ĭwɛi | jwiejH | ʷiᴇi | iuᴇi | juæi | jwiaj | PGjyaj | wjej | wjej |
| 蟹 | 祭三合B | i̯wɛi | iuɛi | ĭwɛi | jwejH | ʷɻiᴇi | ɣiuᴇi | juæi | wiaj | yaj | wej | wej |
| 蟹 | 廢三合 | i̯wæi | iuɐi | ĭwɐi | jwojH | ʷiai | ʉɐi | juɐi | uaj | yaj | wøj | wøj |
| 蟹 | 齊四合 | iwei | uei | iwei | wej | ʷei | wei | iuei | wɛj | Gjyaj | wɐj | wɪj |
| 止 | 支三開B | iě | ie | ĭe | je | ɻiᴇ | ɣiᴇ | ie | iə̆ | i, SRṛ, STẓ | e | i |
| 止 | 支三開A | iě | je | ĭe | jie | iᴇ | iᴇ | iɪ | jiə̆ | PGji | je | ji |
| 止 | 脂三開A | i | ji | i | jij | i | iɪ | iɪi | ji | PGji | ji | ji |
| 止 | 脂三開B | i | i | i | ij | ɻi | ɣiɪ | iei | i | i, SRṛ, STẓ | i | i |
| 止 | 之三開m | i | iə | ĭə | i | ɨ | ɨ | i | ɨ | i, SRṛ, STẓ | i | e |
| 止 | 微三開 | ěi | iəi | ĭəi | jɨj | iɤi | ɨi | iəi | ɨj | i | yj | yj |
| 止 | 支三合A | wiě | jue | ĭwe | jwie | ʷiᴇ | iuᴇ | iuɪ | jwiə̆ | PGjyj | wje | wji |
| 止 | 支三合B | wiě | iue | ĭwe | jwe | ʷɻiᴇ | ɣiuᴇ | iue | wiə̆ | yj, SRuj | we | wi |
| 止 | 脂三合B | wi | ui | wi | wij | ʷɻi | ɣiuɪ | iuei | wi | yj, SRuj | wi | wi |
| 止 | 脂三合A | wi | jui | wi | jwij | ʷi | iuɪ | iuɪi | jwi | PGjyj | wji | wji |
| 止 | 微三合 | wěi | iuəi | ĭwəi | jwɨj | ʷiɤi | ʉi | iuəi | uj | yj | wyj | wyj |
| 效 | 豪一開 | ɑu | ɑu | ɑu | aw | ɑu | ɑu | ɑu | aw | (u)aw | ɑw | ɐw |
| 效 | 肴二開 | au | au | au | æw | ɰæu | ɣau | au | aɨw | aːw, Gjaːw | ɛw | ɛw |
| 效 | 宵三開B | i̯ɛu | iɛu | ĭɛu | jew | ɻiᴇu | ɣiᴇu | iau | iaw | iaw | ew | ew |
| 效 | 宵三開A | i̯ɛu | jɛu | ĭɛu | jiew | iᴇu | iᴇu | iæu | jiaw | PGjiaw, Aiaw | jew | jew |
| 效 | 蕭四開 | ieu | eu | ieu | ew | eu | eu | iɛu | ɛw | PGjiaw, Aiaw | ɪw | ɪw |
| 流 | 侯一開 | ə̆u | u | əu | uw | u | əu | əu | əw | əw | ʉ | u |
| 流 | 尤三開m | iə̆u | iu | ĭəu | juw | iu | ɨu | iəu | uw | iw, SRəw, Məw | y | y |
| 流 | 幽三開A | i̯ĕu | iĕu | iəu | jiw | ɨu | iɪu | iɪu | jiw | jiw | iw | iw |
| 咸 | 覃一開 | ɑ̌m | ɒm | ɒm | om | əm | ʌm | əm | əm | am | ɔm | ɔm |
| 咸 | 談一開 | ɑm | ɑm | ɑm | am | ɑm | ɑm | ɑm | am | am | ɑm | ɐm |
| 咸 | 咸二開 | ə̆m | ɐm | ɐm | ɛm | ɰɛm | ɣɛm | æm | əɨm | aːm, Gjaːm | ɛm | ɛm |
| 咸 | 銜二開 | am | am | am | æm | ɰæm | ɣam | am | aɨm | aːm, Gjaːm | æm | ɛm |
| 咸 | 鹽三開A | i̯ɛm | jɛm | ĭɛm | jiem | iᴇm | iᴇm | iæm | jiam | PGjiam | jem | jem |
| 咸 | 鹽三開B | i̯ɛm | iɛm | ĭɛm | jem | ɻiᴇm | ɣiᴇm | iam | iam | iam | em | em |
| 咸 | 嚴三開 | i̯æm | iɐm | ĭɐm | jæm | iam | ɨɐm | iɑm | ɨam | iam | øm | øm |
| 咸 | 添四開 | iem | em | iem | em | em | em | iɛm | ɛm | PGjiam, Aiam | ɪm | ɪm |
| 咸 | 凡三合 | i̯wæm | iuɐm | ĭwɐm | jom/jwom? | iu̯am | ʉɐm | iuam | uam | iam | œm | øm |
| 深 | 侵三開B | i̯əm | iəm | ĭĕm | im | ɻim | ɣiɪm | iem | im | im, SRəm | im | im |
| 深 | 侵三開A | i̯əm | jəm | ĭĕm | jim | im | iɪm | iɪm | jim | PGjim | jim | jim |
| 山 | 寒一開 | ɑn | ɑn | ɑn | an | ɑn | ɑn | ɑn | an | an | ɑn | ɐn |
| 山 | 刪二開 | an | an | an | æn | ɰæn | ɣan | æn | aɨn | aːn, Gjaːn | æn | ɛn |
| 山 | 山二開 | ə̆n | ɛn | æn | ɛn | ɰɛn | ɣɛn | an | əɨn | aːn, Gjaːn | ɛn | ɛn |
| 山 | 仙三開A | i̯ɛn | jɛn | ĭɛn | jien | iᴇn | iᴇn | iæn | jian | PGjian | jen | jen |
| 山 | 仙三開B | i̯ɛn | iɛn | ĭɛn | jen | ɻiᴇn | ɣiᴇn | ian | ian | ian | en | en |
| 山 | 元三開 | i̯æn | iɐn | ĭɐn | jon | iɤn | ɨɐn | iɑn | ɨan | ian | øn | øn |
| 山 | 先四開 | ien | en | ien | en | en | en | iɛn | ɛn | PGjian, Aian | ɪn | ɪn |
| 山 | 桓一合 | uɑn | uɑn | uɑn | wan | ʷɑn | uɑn | uɑn | wan | uan | wɑn | wɐn |
| 山 | 刪二合 | wan | uan | wan | wæn | ʷɰæn | ɣuan | uæn | waɨn | waːn | wæn | wɛn |
| 山 | 山二合 | wə̆n | uɛn | wæn | wɛn | ʷɰɛn | ɣuɛn | uan | wəɨn | waːn | wɛn | wɛn |
| 山 | 仙三合A | i̯wɛn | juɛn | ĭwɛn | jwien | ʷiᴇn | iuᴇn | iuæn | jwian | PGjyan | wjen | wjen |
| 山 | 仙三合B | i̯wɛn | iuɛn | ĭwɛn | jwen | ʷɻiᴇn | ɣiuᴇn | iuan | wian | yan | wen | wen |
| 山 | 元三合 | i̯wæn | iuɐn | ĭwɐn | jwon | ʷiɤn | ʉɐn | iuɑn | uan | yan | wøn | wøn |
| 山 | 先四合 | iwen | uen | iwen | wen | ʷen | wen | iuɛn | wɛn | jyan | wɪn | wɪn |
| 臻 | 痕一開 | ən | ən | ən | on | ən | ən | ən | ən | ən | ən | ən |
| 臻 | 臻三開B | i̯ɛn | iɛn | ĭæn | in | in | ɪn | en | in | in, SRən | in | in |
| 臻 | 眞三開B | i̯ēn | iēn | ĭĕn | in | ɻin | ɣiɪn | ien | in | in, SRən | in | in |
| 臻 | 眞三開A | i̯ēn | jēn | ĭĕn | jin | ɪn | iɪn | iɪn | jin | PGjin | jin | jin |
| 臻 | 欣三開 | i̯ən | iən | ĭən | jɨn | ɨn | ɨn | iən | ɨn | in | in | yn |
| 臻 | 魂一合 | u̯ən | uən | uən | won | u̯on | uən | uən | wən | un | ʏn | ʏn |
| 臻 | 眞三合B | i̯wēn | iuēn | ĭĕn | win | ʷɻin | ɣiuɪn | iuen | win | yn | win | win |
| 臻 | 諄三合B | i̯uēn | iuēn | ĭwĕn | win | ʷɻin | ɣiuɪn | iuen | win | yn | win | win |
| 臻 | 諄三合A | i̯uēn | juēn | ĭwĕn | jwin | ʷin | iuɪn | iuɪn | jwin | PGjyn | jwin | jwin |
| 臻 | 文三合 | i̯uən | iuən | ĭuən | jun | iun | ɨun | iuən | un | yn, SRut | yn | yn |
| 宕 | 唐一開 | ɑŋ | ɑŋ | ɑŋ | aŋ | ɑŋ | ɑŋ | ɑŋ | aŋ [ɑŋ] | aŋ [ɑŋ] | ɑŋ | ɐŋ |
| 宕 | 陽三開m | i̯aŋ | iaŋ | ĭaŋ | jaŋ | iaŋ | ɨɐŋ | iɑŋ | ɨaŋ [ɨɑŋ] | iaŋ [iɑŋ], SRaːŋ [SRɑːŋ] | œŋ | œŋ |
| 宕 | 唐一合 | wɑŋ | uɑŋ | uɑŋ | waŋ | ʷɑŋ | wɑŋ | uɑŋ | waŋ [wɑŋ] | uaŋ [uɑŋ] | wɑŋ | wɐŋ |
| 宕 | 陽三合m | i̯waŋ | iuaŋ | ĭwaŋ | jwaŋ | ʷiaŋ | ʉɐŋ | iuaŋ | uaŋ [uɑŋ] | yaŋ [yɑŋ] | wœŋ | wœŋ |
| 江 | 江二開 | ɔŋ | ɔŋ | ɔŋ | æwŋ | oŋ | ɣʌŋ | oŋ | aɨwŋ | ɰɔŋ | ɔŋ | ɔŋ |
| 曾 | 登一開 | əŋ | əŋ | əŋ | oŋ | əŋ | əŋ | əŋ | əŋ | əə̆ŋ [ɤŋ] | oŋ | oŋ |
| 曾 | 蒸三開m | i̯əŋ | iəŋ | ĭəŋ | iŋ | ɨŋ | ɨŋ | iəŋ | iŋ | iə̆ŋ [iɛŋ], iə̆k [iɛk], SRəə̆k [SRɤk] | iŋ | iŋ |
| 曾 | 登一合 | wəŋ | uəŋ | uəŋ | woŋ | ʷəŋ | wəŋ | uəŋ | wəŋ | uə̆ŋ [uɔŋ] | woŋ | woŋ |
| 曾 | 蒸三合m | i̯wəŋ | iuəŋ | ĭwəŋ | wiŋ | ʷɨŋ | wɨŋ | iuəŋ | wiŋ | yə̆ŋ [yɛŋ] | wiŋ | wiŋ |
| 梗 | 庚二開 | æŋ | ɐŋ | ɐŋ | æŋ | ɰæŋ | ɣæŋ | aŋ | aɨjŋ | aːjŋ, Gjaːjŋ | æŋ | ɛŋ |
| 梗 | 耕二開 | ɛŋ | ɛŋ | æŋ | ɛŋ | ɰɛŋ | ɣɛŋ | æŋ | əɨjŋ | aːjŋ, Gjaːjŋ | ɛŋ | ɛŋ |
| 梗 | 庚三開B | i̯æŋ | iɐŋ | ĭɐŋ | jæŋ | iaŋ | ɣiæŋ | iaŋ | iajŋ | ɰiæŋ | eŋ | jɛŋ |
| 梗 | 清三開B | i̯ɛŋ | iɛŋ | ĭɛŋ | jeŋ | － | iᴇŋ | iæŋ | iajŋ | iajŋ | eŋ | eŋ |
| 梗 | 清三開A | i̯ɛŋ | jɛŋ | ĭɛŋ | jieŋ | iᴇŋ | iᴇŋ | iæŋ | jiajŋ | PGjiajŋ, Aiajŋ | jeŋ | jeŋ |
| 梗 | 青四開 | ieŋ | eŋ | ieŋ | eŋ | eŋ | eŋ | iɛŋ | ɛjŋ | PGjiajŋ, Aiajŋ | ɪŋ | ɪŋ |
| 梗 | 庚二合 | wæŋ | uɐŋ | wɐŋ | wæŋ | ʷɰæŋ | wɣæŋ | uaŋ | waɨjŋ | waːjŋ | wæŋ | wɛŋ |
| 梗 | 耕二合 | wɛŋ | uɛŋ | wæŋ | wɛŋ | ʷɯɛŋ | wɣɛŋ | uæŋ | wəɨjŋ | waːjŋ | wɛŋ | wɛŋ |
| 梗 | 庚三合B | i̯wæŋ | iuɐŋ | ĭwɐŋ | jwæŋ | ʷɰiæŋ | wɣiæŋ | iuaŋ | wiajŋ | yajŋ | weŋ | wjɛŋ |
| 梗 | 清三合B | i̯wɛŋ | iuɛŋ | ĭwɛŋ | jweŋ | － | wiᴇŋ | iuæŋ | wiajŋ | yajŋ | weŋ | weŋ |
| 梗 | 清三合A | i̯wɛŋ | juɛŋ | ĭwɛŋ | jwieŋ | ʷiᴇŋ | wiᴇŋ | iuæŋ | jwiajŋ | jyajŋ | wjeŋ | wjeŋ |
| 梗 | 青四合 | iweŋ | ueŋ | iweŋ | weŋ | ʷeŋ | weŋ | iuɛŋ | Kwɛjŋ | jyajŋ | wɪŋ | wɪŋ |
| 通 | 東一合 | uŋ | uŋ | uŋ | uwŋ | uŋ | uŋ | uŋ | əwŋ | əwŋ | ʉŋ | ʉŋ |
| 通 | 冬一合 | uoŋ | oŋ | uoŋ | owŋ | u̯oŋ | uoŋ | uoŋ | awŋ | əwŋ | uŋ | əŋ |
| 通 | 東三合m | iuŋ | iuŋ | ĭuŋ | juwŋ | iuŋ | ɨuŋ | iuŋ | uwŋ | iwŋ, SRəwŋ, Məwŋ | yŋ | yŋ |
| 通 | 鍾三合m | i̯woŋ | ioŋ | ĭwoŋ | jowŋ | io̝ŋ | ɨoŋ | iuoŋ | uawŋ | ywŋ | øŋ | øŋ |

== Modern reflexes ==
The following tables show the general development of Early Middle Chinese finals in modern languages.

The languages are as follows:

- Chinese languages (except Min), including:
  - Cantonese (Yue), with three varieties: Standard Cantonese (Guanzhou—Hong Kong), Watlam (Yulin), and Taishanese
  - Moiyen Hakka
  - Nanchang Gan
  - Wu, with three varieties: Kaihua, Wenzhou and Shanghai
  - Mandarin, with three varieties: Lianshui (Lower Yangtze), Wuhan (Upper Yangtze), and Beijing (or Standard Mandarin)
- Min languages, including:
  - Northern Min, with two varieties: Wuyishan and Jian'ou
  - Central Min (Yong'an)
  - Eastern Min, with two varieties: Fuzhou and Ningde
  - Hinghwa (Pu-Xian Min)
  - Southern Min, including:
    - Choanchew (Quanzhou) Hokkien, represented by a conservative variety of the rimebook Lūi-im Biāu-ngō͘ (彙音妙悟), somewhat different from modern urban Quanzhou dialect
    - Changchew (Zhangzhou) Hokkien, represented by modern urban Zhangzhou dialect
    - Teochew, represented by the Swatow dialect
- Sino-Xenic pronunciations, including:
  - Sino-Japanese Go-on and Kan-on, with spelling based on historical kana orthography
  - Sino-Korean
  - Sino-Vietnamese

A single MC final may have multiple modern outcomes, depending on the MC initial. The initials are indicated using the following codes:

- P — labials (p, ph, b, m)
- F — MC labials becoming fricatives (f, w, or h(u)) in modern languages
- T — dental plosives (t, th, d, n)
- S — dental sibilants (ts, tsh, dz, s, z)
- K — velars (k, kh, g, ŋ) and gutturals (x, h, ʔ, y)
- Tr — retroflex plosives (tr, trh, dr)
- Sy — palatal sibilants (tsy, tsyh, dzy, sy, zy)
- Sr — retroflex sibilants (tsr, tsrh, dzr, sr)

The finals 來 l and 娘 nr may behave like T and Tr respectively, but sometimes they have different patterns.

For Min languages, only the literary reflexes are given.

=== Open-vowel finals ===
==== Groups 果 and 假 ====
| Rhyme | Class | | 歌 | 戈 | | | 歌 | 戈 | 麻 | | | | 麻 | | | 戈 | |
| Rhyme | Division | | 一 | 一 | | | 一 | 一 | 二 | | | | 三 | | | 三 | |
| Rhyme | Rounding | | 開 | 合 | | | 開 | 合 | 開 | | | 合 | 開 | | | 開 | 合 |
| Initial | | | TS | T | S | P | K | K | TrSr | P | K | K | Sy | S | 以 | K | K |
|---|---|---|---|---|---|---|---|---|---|---|---|---|---|---|---|---|---|
| Chinese | Cantonese | Standard | ɔː | | | | | uɔː | aː | | | uaː | ɛː | | iɛː | ɛː | œː |
| Chinese | Cantonese | Watlam | ɵ | | | | | | ɔ | | | | ɛ | | iɛ | ɛ | œ |
| Chinese | Cantonese | Taishan | ɔ | | | | | | a | | | | e | | ie | ia | |
| Chinese | Hakka | Moiyen | ɔ | | | | | uɔ | a | | | ua | a | ia | | io | |
| Chinese | Gan | Nanchang | o | | | | | uo | a | | | ua | a | ia | | | |
| Chinese | Wu | Kaihua | o | | | | | | ɔ | | ɔ, iɔ | uɔ | ie | | | ia | ye |
| Chinese | Wu | Wenzhou | əu | | o | u | | | o | | | | ei | | i | ɿ | y |
| Chinese | Wu | Shanghai | u | | | | | | o | | a, ia | o | | ia | | | yø |
| Chinese | Mandarin | Lianshui | o | | | | | | a | | a, ia | ua | ei | i | | | y |
| Chinese | Mandarin | Wuhan | o | | | | | | a | | ia | ua | ə | ie | | ye | |
| Chinese | Mandarin | Beijing | uo | | | | ə | ə, uo | a | | ia | ua | ə | iɛ | | | yɛ |
| Min | Northern | Wuyishan | o | | | | | | a | | | ua | ia | | | yo | |
| Min | Northern | Jian'ou | ɔ | | | | | o | a | | | ua | ia | | | iɔ | |
| Min | Central | Yong'an | aɯ | | | | ɯ | | ɒ | | | uɒ | iɒ | | | iɯ | |
| Min | Eastern | Fuzhou | ɔ | | | | | uɔ | a | | | ua | ia | | | yo | uo |
| Min | Eastern | Ningde | ɔ | | | | | u | a | | | ua | ie | | | y | u |
| Min | Hinghwa | Xianyou | ɒ | | | | ɒ, o | ɒ | a | | | ua | ia | | | iɛu | ya |
| Min | Southern | Choanchew | o | | | | | | a | | a | ua | ia | | | io | |
| Min | Southern | Changchew | o | | | | | | a | | ɛ | ua | ia | | | io | |
| Min | Southern | Teochew | o | | | | | | a | | ia | ua | ia | | | io | |
| Sino-Xenic | Japanese | Go-on | a | | | | | wa | ja | e | | we | ja | | | | e |
| Sino-Xenic | Japanese | Kan-on | a | | | | | wa | a | | | wa | ja | | | | a |
| Sino-Xenic | Korean | | a | | wa | a | | wa | a | | | wa | a | | ja | a | wa |
| Sino-Xenic | Vietnamese | | a | wa | | a | | wa | a | | | wa | a | | | | wa |

==== Group 止 ====
| Rhyme | Class | | 支 脂 | 支 脂 之 | 支 脂 之 微 | 支 脂 之 | | 支 脂 | | | | 微 | |
| Rhyme | Division | | 三 | | | | | | | | | | |
| Rhyme | Rounding | | 開 | 開 | 開 | 開 | | 合 | | | | 合 | |
| Initial | | | P | T | K | TrSy | SrS | TrSy | S | Sr | K | K | F |
|---|---|---|---|---|---|---|---|---|---|---|---|---|---|
| Chinese | Cantonese | Standard | ei | | ei, iː | iː | | ɵy | | | uɐi | | ei |
| Chinese | Cantonese | Watlam | i | | | | | ui | | ɔi | uai | | i |
| Chinese | Cantonese | Taishan | ei | | ei, i | i | u | ui | | | ei | | |
| Chinese | Hakka | Moiyen | i | | | ɿ | | ui | | ɔi | ui | | i |
| Chinese | Gan | Nanchang | i | | | ɿ | | i | | ai | ui | | i |
| Chinese | Wu | Kaihua | i, e | i | | ɿ | | ui | | ue | ui | | i |
| Chinese | Wu | Wenzhou | ei | | ɿ | | | | | ai | uai | | ei |
| Chinese | Wu | Shanghai | i | | | ɿ | | ø | | e | ue | | i |
| Chinese | Mandarin | Lianshui | i, ei | ei | i | ɿ | | uei | ei | uɛ | uei | | ei |
| Chinese | Mandarin | Wuhan | i, ei | i | | ɿ | | uei | ei | uai | uei | | ei |
| Chinese | Mandarin | Beijing | i, ei | i | | ɿ | | uei | | uai | uei | | ei |
| Min | Northern | Wuyishan | ei | | i | | u | y | əu | ui | əu | | ue, ei |
| Min | Northern | Jian'ou | i | | | | u | y | | o | y | | i |
| Min | Central | Yong'an | i | | | ɿ | | ue | | | yi | yi, ue | ue |
| Min | Eastern | Fuzhou | i | i, ei | | ie | y | uei | | øy | uei | | uei, i |
| Min | Eastern | Ningde | i, ei | | | | ou | oi | | øy | oi, ui | | ui, i |
| Min | Hinghwa | Xianyou | i | | | | o | ui | | uoi | ui | | uoi, i |
| Min | Southern | Choanchew | i | | | | ɯ | ui | | ue | ui | | |
| Min | Southern | Changchew | i | | | | u | ui | | ue | ui | | |
| Min | Southern | Teochew | i | | | | ə | ui | | ue | ui | | |
| Sino-Xenic | Japanese | Go-on | i | | i, e | i | | ui | | | wi | | i |
| Sino-Xenic | Japanese | Kan-on | i | | | | | ui | | | wi | i | |
| Sino-Xenic | Korean | | i | | i, ɰi | i | a | u | | ø | ju, y, we | i, y | i |
| Sino-Xenic | Vietnamese | | i | | | | ɨ | wi | | | | i, wi | i |

==== Group 蟹 (open) ====
| Rhyme | Class | | 咍 泰 | 咍 | 泰 | | 皆 夬 佳 | 皆 佳 | 祭 | 祭 齊 | | |
| Rhyme | Division | | 一 | | | | 二 | | 三 | 三四 | | |
| Rhyme | Rounding | | 開 | | | | 開 | | 開 | 開 | | |
| Initial | | | P | TSK | K | T | PTrSr | K | TrSy | P | TS | K |
|---|---|---|---|---|---|---|---|---|---|---|---|---|
| Chinese | Cantonese | Standard | ui | ɔi | | aːi | | | ɐi | | | |
| Chinese | Cantonese | Watlam | ui | ɔi | | ai | | | | i | ai | |
| Chinese | Cantonese | Taishan | ɔi | | | ai | | | | | | |
| Chinese | Hakka | Moiyen | i | ɔi | | ai | | | ʅ | i | | |
| Chinese | Gan | Nanchang | i | ai | | | | | ʅ | i | | |
| Chinese | Wu | Kaihua | e, i | ɛ | | | | | ʅ, i | i | e | i |
| Chinese | Wu | Wenzhou | ai | e | | a | | | ei | | | i |
| Chinese | Wu | Shanghai | e | | | a | | | ʅ | i | | |
| Chinese | Mandarin | Lianshui | ei | ɛ | | | | | ʅ | i | | |
| Chinese | Mandarin | Wuhan | ei | ai | | | | | ʅ | i, ei | i | |
| Chinese | Mandarin | Beijing | ei | ai | | | | iɛ | ʅ | i | | |
| Min | Northern | Wuyishan | ui | uai, ai | | uai | ai | | i | ei | | i |
| Min | Northern | Jian'ou | o | uɛ, ai | | uɛ | ai | | i | | | |
| Min | Central | Yong'an | ue | ue, a | a | | | ia | ʅ | i | | e |
| Min | Eastern | Fuzhou | uei | ai | | | | | ie | ei, i | ɛ, i | ie |
| Min | Eastern | Ningde | ui | ai | | | | | i | ei, i | ɛ, i | i |
| Min | Hinghwa | Xianyou | uoi | ai | | | | | e | | e, i | e |
| Min | Southern | Choanchew | ue | ai | | | | | e | e, i | e, i | e |
| Min | Southern | Changchew | ue | ai | | | | | e | i | e, i | e |
| Min | Southern | Teochew | ue | ai | | | | | i | | | |
| Sino-Xenic | Japanese | Go-on | ai | | | | e | | | e, ai | ai | e |
| Sino-Xenic | Japanese | Kan-on | ai | | | | | | ei | | | |
| Sino-Xenic | Korean | | ɛ | | | | | | je | je, i | je | |
| Sino-Xenic | Vietnamese | | oi | ai | | | | | e | | | |

==== Group 蟹 (closed) ====
| Rhyme | Class | | 灰 泰 | | | 皆 夬 | 佳 | 廢 祭 | | |
| Rhyme | Division | | 一 | | | 二 | 二 | 三 | | |
| Rhyme | Rounding | | 合 | | | 合 | 合 | 合 | | |
| Initial | | | P | TS | K | K | K | F | TrSyS | K |
|---|---|---|---|---|---|---|---|---|---|---|
| Chinese | Cantonese | Standard | uːi | ɵy | uːi, uɐi | uaːi | uaː | ɐi | ɵy | uɐi |
| Chinese | Cantonese | Watlam | ui | | | uɔi | uɔ | i | ui | ei |
| Chinese | Cantonese | Taishan | ɔi | ui | ɔi | ai | a | ei | ui | uai |
| Chinese | Hakka | Moiyen | i, ɔi | ui | ui, uai | uai | ua | i | ɔi | ui, i |
| Chinese | Gan | Nanchang | i | ui, i | ui, uai | uai | ua | i | | ui |
| Chinese | Wu | Kaihua | e | | ui, ue | uɛ | uɔ | e | ui | |
| Chinese | Wu | Wenzhou | ai | | | a | o | ei | ʅ | u, y |
| Chinese | Wu | Shanghai | e | ø | ue | ua | o | i | ø | ue |
| Chinese | Mandarin | Lianshui | ei | | uei | uɛ | ua | ei | uei, ei | uei |
| Chinese | Mandarin | Wuhan | ei | | uei | uai | ua | ei | uei | |
| Chinese | Mandarin | Beijing | ei | uei | | uai | ua | ei | uei | |
| Min | Northern | Wuyishan | ui | | | uai | ua | ue | əu | |
| Min | Northern | Jian'ou | o | | | uɛ | ua | i | y | |
| Min | Central | Yong'an | ue | | | ue | uɒ | yi | ue | yi |
| Min | Eastern | Fuzhou | uei | uei, øy | uei | uai | ua | ie | uei | ie |
| Min | Eastern | Ningde | ui | ɔi, øy | ui | uoi | uo | i | ui | i |
| Min | Hinghwa | Xianyou | uoi | uoi, ui | uoi | uoi | ua | i | uoi | e |
| Min | Southern | Choanchew | ue, ui | ui, ue | | uai | ua | ui | ue | ui |
| Min | Southern | Changchew | ue | ui, ue | | uai | ua | ui | ue | ui |
| Min | Southern | Teochew | ue | ui, ue | | uai | ua | ui | ue | ui |
| Sino-Xenic | Japanese | Go-on | e, ai | ai | we | | | o | ai | we |
| Sino-Xenic | Japanese | Kan-on | ai | | wai | | | ai | ei | wei |
| Sino-Xenic | Korean | | ɛ | ø, ɛ | ø | wɛ | | je | je, ju | |
| Sino-Xenic | Vietnamese | | ui | | wai | | | e | we | |

==== Group 遇 ====
| Rhyme | Class | | 魚 | 模 | | | | 虞 | | 魚 | | 虞 | 魚 | | 虞 |
| Rhyme | Division | | 三 | 一 | | | | 三 | | 三 | | 三 | 三 | | 三 |
| Rhyme | Rounding | | 開 | 開 | | | | 合 | | 開 | | 合 | 開 | | 合 |
| Initial | | | Sr | S | T | P | K | F | TrSy | TrSy | S | S | 來，娘 | K | K |
|---|---|---|---|---|---|---|---|---|---|---|---|---|---|---|---|
| Chinese | Cantonese | Standard | ɔː | ou | | | uː | | yː | | ɵy | | | | |
| Chinese | Cantonese | Watlam | ɵ | u | | | | | y | | | | | | |
| Chinese | Cantonese | Taishan | o | u | | | | | i | | ui | | | | |
| Chinese | Hakka | Moiyen | ʅ | | u | | | | | | i | | | | |
| Chinese | Gan | Nanchang | u | | | | | | | | i | | | | |
| Chinese | Wu | Kaihua | u, ɔ | u, uo | | | | | y, yo | y | | | | | |
| Chinese | Wu | Wenzhou | əu | øy | | u | | u, øy | ʅ | | | | øy | y | |
| Chinese | Wu | Shanghai | u | | | | | | ʅ | | | y | | | |
| Chinese | Mandarin | Lianshui | u | | | | | | | | y | | | | |
| Chinese | Mandarin | Wuhan | ou | | | u | | | y | | i | y | | | |
| Chinese | Mandarin | Beijing | u | | | | | | | | y | | | | |
| Min | Northern | Wuyishan | u | | | | | | y | | əu | | | | |
| Min | Northern | Jian'ou | u | | | | | | y | | | | | | |
| Min | Central | Yong'an | ɒu | | | u | | | y | | | | | | |
| Min | Eastern | Fuzhou | u | ou, u | | uɔ | ou, u | | øy, y | | | | | | |
| Min | Eastern | Ningde | u | ou, u | | u | ou, u | | øy, y | | | | | | |
| Min | Hinghwa | Xianyou | ø | ɔu | | | | u | y | | | | | | |
| Min | Southern | Choanchew | ɔ | | | | | u | | ɯ | | u | ɯ | | u |
| Min | Southern | Changchew | ɔ | | | | | u | | i | | | | | |
| Min | Southern | Teochew | o | ou | | | | u | | ə | | u | ə | | u |
| Sino-Xenic | Japanese | Go-on | jo | u | | | | | | jo | o | u | o | | u |
| Sino-Xenic | Japanese | Kan-on | o | | | | | u | ju | jo | | ju | jo | | u |
| Sino-Xenic | Korean | | o | | | | | u | ju | ə | jə | y | jə | ə | u |
| Sino-Xenic | Vietnamese | | ɨ | o | | | | u | | ɨ | | u | ɨ | | u |

==== Groups 效 and 流 ====
| Rhyme | Class | | 豪 | 肴 | | 宵 | 宵 蕭 | 侯 | 尤 | | | | 尤 幽 |
| Rhyme | Division | | 一 | 二 | | 三 | 三四 | 一 | 三 | | | | 三 |
| Rhyme | Rounding | | 開 | 開 | | 開 | 開 | 開 | 開 | | | | 開 |
| Initial | | | PTSK | PTrSr | K | TrSy | PTSK | TSK | Sr | TrSy | 來，娘 | S | K |
|---|---|---|---|---|---|---|---|---|---|---|---|---|---|
| Chinese | Cantonese | Standard | ou | aːu | | iːu | | ɐu | | | | | |
| Chinese | Cantonese | Watlam | əu | ɔu | | iu | | au | | | | | |
| Chinese | Cantonese | Taishan | ɔu | | | iɔu | | eu | | iu | | | |
| Chinese | Hakka | Moiyen | au | | | | iau | ɛu | | u | iu | | |
| Chinese | Gan | Nanchang | au | | | ɛu | iɛu | ɛu | | iu | | | |
| Chinese | Wu | Kaihua | əɯ | | əɯ, iəɯ | iəɯ | | ɯ | iɯ | | | | |
| Chinese | Wu | Wenzhou | ɜ | uɔ | | iɛ | | au | | ɤu | | | au |
| Chinese | Wu | Shanghai | ɔ | | ɔ, iɔ | ɔ | iɔ | ɤ | | | iɤ | | |
| Chinese | Mandarin | Lianshui | ɔ | | ɔ, iɔ | ɔ | iɔ | əu | | | iu | | |
| Chinese | Mandarin | Wuhan | au | | iau | au | iau | əu | | | iəu | | |
| Chinese | Mandarin | Beijing | au | | iau | au | iau | ou | | | iou | | |
| Min | Northern | Wuyishan | au | | | iu | | iəu | | iu | | | |
| Min | Northern | Jian'ou | au | | | iau | | e | | iu | | | |
| Min | Central | Yong'an | aɯ | o | | iɯ | | ø | | iau | | | |
| Min | Eastern | Fuzhou | ɔ | au | | ieu | | ɛu | | ieu | | | |
| Min | Eastern | Ningde | ɔ | au | | iɐu | | ɛu | | iu, eu | | | |
| Min | Hinghwa | Xianyou | ɒ | au | | ieu | | | | iu | | | |
| Min | Southern | Choanchew | o, au | au | | iau | | ɯo | | iu | | | |
| Min | Southern | Changchew | o, au | au | | iau | | ɔ | | iu | | | |
| Min | Southern | Teochew | au, o | au | | iau | | ou | | iu | | | |
| Sino-Xenic | Japanese | Go-on | au | eu | | | | u | ju | ju, juu | u | ju | u, juu |
| Sino-Xenic | Japanese | Kan-on | au | | | eu | | ou | ou | iu | | | |
| Sino-Xenic | Korean | | o | jo, o | jo | jo, o | jo | u | | ju | | | u, ju |
| Sino-Xenic | Vietnamese | | au | | jau, iəu | iəu | | əu | ɨu | u | ɨu | u | ɨu, əu |

=== Nasal coda finals ===
==== Groups 咸 and 深 ====
| Rhyme | Class | | 談 | 覃 | | 談 | 銜 咸 | | 凡 | 鹽 | 鹽 添 | 嚴 鹽 添 | 鹽 | 侵 | | | | |
| Rhyme | Division | | 一 | | | | 二 | | 三 | 三 | 三四 | 三四 | 三 | 三 | | | | |
| Rhyme | Rounding | | 開 | | | | 開 | 開 | 合 | 開 | 開 | 開 | 開 | 開 | | | | |
| Initial | | | K | | TS | | TrSr | K | F | TrSy | TS | K | P | P | S | K | TrSy | Sr |
|---|---|---|---|---|---|---|---|---|---|---|---|---|---|---|---|---|---|---|
| Chinese | Cantonese | Standard | ɐm | | aːm | | | | aːn | iːm | | | iːn | ɐn | ɐm | | | |
| Chinese | Cantonese | Watlam | ɔm | | | | | | | iɛm | | im | ɛn | an | am | | | |
| Chinese | Cantonese | Taishan | am | | | | | | an | iam | | | en | in | im | | | am |
| Chinese | Hakka | Moiyen | am | | | | | | | | iam | | ian | in | im | | əm | ɛm |
| Chinese | Gan | Nanchang | on | | on, an | an | | | | ɛn | iɛn | | | in | | | ən | ɛn |
| Chinese | Wu | Kaihua | ã | | | | | iɛ̃ | ã | iɛ̃ | | | | iŋ | | iŋ, ɛ̃ | iŋ, yɛ̃ | ɛ̃ |
| Chinese | Wu | Wenzhou | y, ø | | a, ø | a | | | | i | | | | eŋ | aŋ | iaŋ | aŋ | |
| Chinese | Wu | Shanghai | ø | ø, e | e, ø | e | | | | ø | i | | | iɲ | | | əɲ | |
| Chinese | Mandarin | Lianshui | æ̃ | | | | | iaŋ | æ̃ | æ̃, iẽ | iẽ | | | in | | | ən | |
| Chinese | Mandarin | Wuhan | an | | | | | an, iɛn | an | | iɛn | | | in | | | ən | |
| Chinese | Mandarin | Beijing | an | | | | | iɛn | an | | iɛn | | | in | | | ən | |
| Min | Northern | Wuyishan | ɔŋ | aŋ | | | | | uaiŋ | iŋ | | | | eiŋ | | iŋ | | aiŋ |
| Min | Northern | Jian'ou | ɔŋ | aŋ | | | | | uaŋ | iŋ | | | | eiŋ | | | | aiŋ |
| Min | Central | Yong'an | õ | | | | | | um | iɛ̃i | ɛ̃i | | | ã | | iã | | ĩ |
| Min | Eastern | Fuzhou | aŋ | | | | | | uaŋ | ieŋ | | | | iŋ | | | | eiŋ |
| Min | Eastern | Ningde | am | | | | | | uaŋ | ɛm | | im | ɛŋ | iŋ | im | em, im | | ɛm |
| Min | Hinghwa | Xianyou | aŋ | | | | | | | ieŋ | | | ɛŋ | iŋ | | | | ieŋ |
| Min | Southern | Choanchew | am | | | | | | uan | iam | | | ian | in | im | | | ɯm |
| Min | Southern | Changchew | am | | | | | | uan | iam | | | ian | in | im | | | om |
| Min | Southern | Teochew | am | | | | | | uaŋ | iam | | | ian | iŋ | im | | | im |
| Sino-Xenic | Japanese | Go-on | an | on | an, on | an | en | | on | en | | en, on | en | in | | on | in | |
| Sino-Xenic | Japanese | Kan-on | an | | | | | | | en | | | | in | | | | |
| Sino-Xenic | Korean | | am | | | | | | əm | jəm, əm | jəm, am | jəm, əm | jəm | um | im | ɯm | im | am |
| Sino-Xenic | Vietnamese | | am | | | | | | | iəm | | | | əm | | | | |

==== Groups 山 and 臻 (open) ====
| Rhyme | Class | | 寒 | | 山 刪 | | 仙 | 元 仙 先 | 痕 | 欣 | 真 | | |
| Rhyme | Division | | 一 | | 二 | | 三 | 三四 | 一 | 三 | 三 | | |
| Rhyme | Rounding | | 開 | | 開 | | 開 | 開 | 開 | 開 | 開 | | |
| Initial | | | K | TS | PTrSr | K | TrSy | PTSK | K | K | PK | S | TrSy |
|---|---|---|---|---|---|---|---|---|---|---|---|---|---|
| Chinese | Cantonese | Standard | ɔːn | aːn | | | iːn | | ɐn | | | | |
| Chinese | Cantonese | Watlam | ɔn | | | | iɛn | in | an | | | | |
| Chinese | Cantonese | Taishan | ɔn | an | | | en | | in | | | | |
| Chinese | Hakka | Moiyen | ɔn | an | | an, ian | an | ian | ɛn | iun | in | | ən |
| Chinese | Gan | Nanchang | on | an | | | ɛn | iɛn | ɛn | in | in | | ən |
| Chinese | Wu | Kaihua | oŋ | ã | | iɛ̃ | | | ɛ̃ | ɛ̃, iŋ | iŋ | | iŋ, yɛ̃ |
| Chinese | Wu | Wenzhou | y, ø | a | | | i | | aŋ | iaŋ | eŋ | aŋ | |
| Chinese | Wu | Shanghai | ø | e | | e, i | ø | i | əɲ | iɲ | | | əɲ |
| Chinese | Mandarin | Lianshui | æ̃ | | | æ̃, iaŋ | iẽ, æ̃ | iẽ | ən | in | | | ən |
| Chinese | Mandarin | Wuhan | an | | | an, iɛn | an | iɛn | ən | in | | | ən |
| Chinese | Mandarin | Beijing | an | | | iɛn | an | iɛn | ən | in | | | ən |
| Min | Northern | Wuyishan | uaiŋ | | uaiŋ, aiŋ | aiŋ | iŋ | | aiŋ | əŋ | eiŋ | | |
| Min | Northern | Jian'ou | uiŋ | | uiŋ, aiŋ | aiŋ | iŋ | | aiŋ | eiŋ | | | |
| Min | Central | Yong'an | um | | ĩ | | ɛ̃i | | ĩ | uã | ã | | iã |
| Min | Eastern | Fuzhou | aŋ | | | | ieŋ | | yŋ | | iŋ | | |
| Min | Eastern | Ningde | aŋ | | | | iŋ, ɛŋ | | yŋ | | iŋ, eŋ | | |
| Min | Hinghwa | Xianyou | aŋ | | | | ɛŋ | | ən | yŋ | iŋ | | |
| Min | Southern | Choanchew | an | | | | iɛn | | ɯn | | in | | |
| Min | Southern | Changchew | an | | | | iɛn | | in | | in | | |
| Min | Southern | Teochew | aŋ | | | | ieŋ | | əŋ | | iŋ | | |
| Sino-Xenic | Japanese | Go-on | an | | en | | | en, on | on | | in, on | in | |
| Sino-Xenic | Japanese | Kan-on | an | | | | en | | on | in | | | |
| Sino-Xenic | Korean | | an | | | | jən | | ɯn | | in, ɯn | in | |
| Sino-Xenic | Vietnamese | | an | | | | iən | | ən | | | | |

==== Groups 山 and 臻 (closed) ====
| Rhyme | Class | | 桓 | | | 刪 山 | 仙 | 刪 | 元 | 仙 | 元 仙 先 | 魂 | | | | 文 | 淳 | | 文 真 淳 |
| Rhyme | Division | | 一 | | | 二 | 三 | 二 | 三 | 三 | 三四 | 一 | | | | 三 | 三 | | 三 |
| Rhyme | Rounding | | 合 | | | 合 | 合 | 合 | 合 | 合 | 合 | 合 | | | | 合 | 合 | | 合 |
| Initial | | | P | T | K | K | TrSrSy | Sr | F | S | K | P | T | S | K | F | TrSy | S | K |
|---|---|---|---|---|---|---|---|---|---|---|---|---|---|---|---|---|---|---|---|
| Chinese | Cantonese | Standard | uːn | yːn | uːn | uaːn | yːn | aːn | | yːn | | uːn | ɵn | yːn | uɐn | ɐn | ɵn | | uɐn |
| Chinese | Cantonese | Watlam | un | yn | un | uɔn | yn | ɔn | | yn | | un | yn | | uan | an | | | uan |
| Chinese | Cantonese | Taishan | ɔn | | | an | un | an | | un | | ɔn | | un | | | | | |
| Chinese | Hakka | Moiyen | an | ɔn | uɔn | uan | ian | ɔn | an | ian | | un | | | | | | | iun |
| Chinese | Gan | Nanchang | on | | uon | uan | on | | an | yon | | ən | | | un | | ən | in | |
| Chinese | Wu | Kaihua | ɛ̃ | uã | | | yɛ̃ | uã | ã | yɛ̃ | | ɛ̃ | uɑ̃ | | | ɛ̃ | yŋ | | |
| Chinese | Wu | Wenzhou | ø | | y | a | y | ø | a | y | | aŋ | ø | | aŋ | | oŋ | | |
| Chinese | Wu | Shanghai | ø | | uø | ue | ø | | e | yø | | əɲ | | | uəɲ | əɲ | | yɲ | |
| Chinese | Mandarin | Lianshui | õ | | | uæ̃ | õ | uæ̃ | æ̃ | yẽ | | ən | | | uən | ən | uən | yn | |
| Chinese | Mandarin | Wuhan | an | | uan | | | | an | yɛn | | ən | | | uən | ən | yn | in | yn |
| Chinese | Mandarin | Beijing | an | uan | | | | | an | yɛn | | ən | uən | | | ən | uən | yn | |
| Min | Northern | Wuyishan | uaiŋ | | | | yiŋ | uaiŋ | | yiŋ | | uiŋ | | | | | əŋ | | |
| Min | Northern | Jian'ou | uiŋ | | | | yiŋ | uiŋ | uaiŋ | yiŋ | | ɔŋ | | | | | œyŋ | | |
| Min | Central | Yong'an | um | | | | yɛ̃i, ɛ̃i | um | | ɛ̃i | yɛ̃i | uã | | | | | | | |
| Min | Eastern | Fuzhou | uaŋ | | | | uɔŋ | uaŋ | | uɔŋ | | uoŋ | | | uŋ | | | | |
| Min | Eastern | Ningde | uoŋ | | | | uŋ | uoŋ | | uŋ | | oŋ | | | uŋ | uŋ, oŋ | | | |
| Min | Hinghwa | Xianyou | uoŋ | | | | yøŋ | uoŋ | | yøŋ | | uoŋ | | | | | | | |
| Min | Southern | Choanchew | uan | | | | uan | | | | | un | | | | | | | |
| Min | Southern | Changchew | uan | | | | uan | | | | | un | | | | | | | |
| Min | Southern | Teochew | uaŋ | | | | uaŋ | | | | | uŋ | | | | | | | |
| Sino-Xenic | Japanese | Go-on | an | | wan | wen | en | | on | en | on, wen | on | | | | un, on | jun | | un, in, on |
| Sino-Xenic | Japanese | Kan-on | an | | wan | | en | an | | en | wen | on | | | | un | jun | | un, in |
| Sino-Xenic | Korean | | an | | wan | | jən | an | ən, an | ən | wən, jən | on, un | | | on | un | | | jun, un |
| Sino-Xenic | Vietnamese | | an | wan | | | wiən | wan | iən, an | wiən | | on | | | | ən | uən | | |

==== Groups 宕, 曾 and 深 (open) ====
| Rhyme | Class | | 唐 | 陽 | | | 登 | | 蒸 | | | 庚 耕 | | 庚 清 青 | 庚 清 |
| Rhyme | Division | | 一 | 三 | | | 一 | | 三 | | | 二 | | 三四 | 三 |
| Rhyme | Rounding | | 開 | 開 | | | 開 | | 開 | | | 開 | | 開 | 開 |
| Initial | | | PTSK | Sr | SK | TrSy | P | TSK | TrSy | P | K | P | TrSrK | PTKS | TrSy |
|---|---|---|---|---|---|---|---|---|---|---|---|---|---|---|---|
| Chinese | Cantonese | Standard | ɔːŋ | | œːŋ | | ɐŋ | | ɪŋ | | | aːŋ | | ɪŋ, ɛːŋ | |
| Chinese | Cantonese | Watlam | uŋ | | a | | aŋ | | ɛŋ | | | a | | ɛŋ | |
| Chinese | Cantonese | Taishan | ɔŋ | | iaŋ | | aŋ | | en | | | aŋ | | en, iaŋ | |
| Chinese | Hakka | Moiyen | ɔŋ | | iɔŋ | ɔŋ | ɛn | | ən | ɛn | in | aŋ | | in, iaŋ | ən, aŋ |
| Chinese | Gan | Nanchang | ɔŋ | | iɔŋ | ɔŋ | uŋ | ɛn | in | | | uŋ | aŋ | in, iaŋ | ɛn, aŋ |
| Chinese | Wu | Kaihua | ã, oŋ | uã, ioŋ | iã | | əŋ | | iŋ | ã | iŋ | əŋ | | iŋ | |
| Chinese | Wu | Wenzhou | uɔ | uɔ, yɔ | i | | oŋ | aŋ | eŋ | | iaŋ | iɛ | | eŋ | |
| Chinese | Wu | Shanghai | ɑ̃ | | iã | ã | | əɲ | | iɲ | | ã | | iɲ | əɲ |
| Chinese | Mandarin | Lianshui | aŋ | uaŋ | iaŋ | aŋ | oŋ | ən | | in | | oŋ | ən | in | ən |
| Chinese | Mandarin | Wuhan | aŋ | yaŋ | iaŋ | aŋ | oŋ | ən | | in | | oŋ | ən | in | ən |
| Chinese | Mandarin | Beijing | aŋ | uaŋ | iaŋ | aŋ | əŋ | | | iŋ | | əŋ | | iŋ | əŋ |
| Min | Northern | Wuyishan | oŋ | | yɔŋ | | aiŋ | | iŋ | aiŋ | iŋ | aiŋ | | eiŋ, iaŋ | iŋ, iaŋ |
| Min | Northern | Jian'ou | ɔŋ | | iɔŋ | | aiŋ | | eiŋ | aiŋ | iŋ | aiŋ | | eiŋ, iaŋ | |
| Min | Central | Yong'an | am | | iam | | ĩ | | iã | ã | | ĩ | | ĩ, ã | |
| Min | Eastern | Fuzhou | ouŋ | | uɔŋ | | eiŋ | | iŋ | | | eiŋ | | iŋ, iaŋ | |
| Min | Eastern | Ningde | ɔŋ | | yŋ | | ɛŋ | | eŋ | iŋ | eŋ | ɛŋ | | eŋ, iɛŋ | |
| Min | Hinghwa | Xianyou | ɒŋ | | yøŋ | | ɛŋ | | iŋ | | | ɛŋ | | iŋ, ɛŋ | |
| Min | Southern | Choanchew | aŋ, ɔŋ | ɔŋ | iɔŋ | | iŋ | ɯŋ | iŋ, in | iŋ | | | | | |
| Min | Southern | Changchew | aŋ, ɔŋ | ɔŋ | iaŋ | | iŋ | iŋ | iŋ, in | iŋ | | | | | |
| Min | Southern | Teochew | aŋ | uaŋ | iaŋ | | eŋ | | | | | | | | |
| Sino-Xenic | Japanese | Go-on | au | jau, au | au | jau | ou | | jou | | | jau | | | |
| Sino-Xenic | Japanese | Kan-on | au | jau, au | jau | | ou | | jou | | | au | | ei | |
| Sino-Xenic | Korean | | aŋ | | jaŋ | | uŋ | ɯŋ | ɯŋ, iŋ | iŋ | ɯŋ | ɛŋ | | jəŋ | |
| Sino-Xenic | Vietnamese | | aŋ | | ɨəŋ | | aŋ | | ɨŋ | aŋ | | ajŋ | | ijŋ | |

==== Groups 宕, 曾, 深, 江 and 通 (closed) ====
| Rhyme | Class | | 陽 | | 唐 | 登 蒸 | 耕 | 庚 | 清 | 庚 青 | 江 | | | | 東 | 東 冬 | 東 鍾 | | | |
| Rhyme | Division | | 三 | | 一 | 一三 | 二 | 二 | 三 | 三四 | 二 | | | | 一 | 一 | 三 | | | |
| Rhyme | Rounding | | 合 | | 合 | 合 | 合 | 合 | 合 | 合 | 合 | | | | 合 | 合 | 合 | | | |
| Initial | | | F | K | K | K | K | K | K | K | Sr | Tr | P | K | P | TSK | F | TrSy | S | K |
|---|---|---|---|---|---|---|---|---|---|---|---|---|---|---|---|---|---|---|---|---|
| Chinese | Cantonese | Standard | ɔːŋ | uɔːŋ | | uɐŋ | | uaːŋ | ɪŋ | wɪŋ | œːŋ | | ɔːŋ | | uŋ | | | | | |
| Chinese | Cantonese | Watlam | uŋ | | | uoŋ | ua | | uɛŋ | | uŋ | | | aŋ | ɔŋ | | | | | |
| Chinese | Cantonese | Taishan | ɔŋ | | | aŋ | | | ien | en | ɔŋ | | | | əŋ | | | | | |
| Chinese | Hakka | Moiyen | ɔŋ | | | ɛn | ɛŋ | uaŋ | ɛn, iun | iuŋ | uŋ | ɔŋ | | | uŋ | | | | iuŋ | |
| Chinese | Gan | Nanchang | ɔŋ | uɔŋ | | ŋ | | uaŋ | yŋ | | ɔŋ | | | | uŋ | | | | | uŋ, iuŋ |
| Chinese | Wu | Kaihua | ã | uã | | oŋ | | uɛ̃ | yŋ | | ioŋ | | ã, oŋ | | oŋ | oŋ, əŋ | əŋ | ioŋ | oŋ | oŋ, ioŋ |
| Chinese | Wu | Wenzhou | uɔ | yɔ | uɔ | oŋ | | iɛ | ioŋ | | yɔ | | uɔ | | oŋ | | | | yɔ, oŋ | |
| Chinese | Wu | Shanghai | ɑ̃ | uɑ̃ | | oŋ | | uɑ̃ | ioŋ, iɲ | ioŋ | ɑ̃ | | | | oŋ | | | | | oŋ, ioŋ |
| Chinese | Mandarin | Lianshui | aŋ | uaŋ | | oŋ | | ən | in, ioŋ | | uaŋ | | aŋ | aŋ, iaŋ | oŋ | | | | | ioŋ |
| Chinese | Mandarin | Wuhan | aŋ | uaŋ | | oŋ | | uən | yn, ioŋ | | uaŋ | | aŋ | aŋ, iaŋ | oŋ | | | | | ioŋ |
| Chinese | Mandarin | Beijing | aŋ | uaŋ | | uŋ | | əŋ | iŋ, yuŋ | | uaŋ | | aŋ | iaŋ | əŋ | uŋ | əŋ | uŋ | | yuŋ |
| Min | Northern | Wuyishan | oŋ | yoŋ | oŋ | əŋ | | oŋ | əŋ | | ɔŋ | | | | əŋ | | | | | |
| Min | Northern | Jian'ou | ɔŋ | uaŋ | | ɔŋ | | uaŋ | eiŋ | œyŋ | ɔŋ | | | | | | | œyŋ | | |
| Min | Central | Yong'an | um | iam | um | am | | um | uã | | am | iam | am | | ã | | | am | | |
| Min | Eastern | Fuzhou | uɔŋ | | | eiŋ | | uaŋ | iŋ | iŋ | ouŋ | | auŋ | ouŋ | uŋ | | | yŋ | | |
| Min | Eastern | Ningde | ɔŋ | | | ɛŋ | | uoŋ | eŋ | | ɔŋ | | | | oŋ | | | yŋ, øŋ | | |
| Min | Hinghwa | Xianyou | ɒŋ | | | ɛŋ | | | yŋ | | ɒŋ | | aŋ | | ɒŋ | | | yøŋ | | |
| Min | Southern | Choanchew | ɔŋ, aŋ | | ɔŋ | | | iŋ | | | ɔŋ | | aŋ | | ɔŋ, aŋ | | | iɔŋ | | |
| Min | Southern | Changchew | ɔŋ, aŋ | | ɔŋ | | | iŋ | | | ɔŋ | | aŋ | | ɔŋ, aŋ | | | iɔŋ | | |
| Min | Southern | Teochew | uaŋ, aŋ | | uaŋ | oŋ | | uaŋ | | ioŋ | uaŋ | | aŋ | | oŋ, aŋ | | | oŋ | | ioŋ |
| Sino-Xenic | Japanese | Go-on | au | wau | | ou | wau | | jau | | ou | | | | u | u, uu | | ju, u, juu, uu | | u, uu |
| Sino-Xenic | Japanese | Kan-on | au | jau | wau | ou | wau | | ei | | au | | | | ou | | jou, ou | juu, jou | | |
| Sino-Xenic | Korean | | aŋ | waŋ | | øŋ, oŋ, uŋ | øŋ | | jəŋ | | aŋ | | | | oŋ | | uŋ, oŋ | juŋ, uŋ, oŋ, joŋ | | |
| Sino-Xenic | Vietnamese | | awŋ | uəŋ | waŋ | | wajŋ | waŋ | wijŋ | | awŋ | aŋ | | | əwŋ | | uwŋ, awŋ | uwŋ | | |

=== Stop coda finals ===
In Middle Chinese phonology, finals with the stop codas (-p, -k, -t) are classified as the entering tone equivalents of nasal coda finals (-m, -ŋ, -n). Many modern languages preserve this correspondence.

Japanese transforms the stop coda into a full mora: -k into -ku or -ki, -t into -tu or -ti, and -p into -fu (the latter may manifest as uː, oː, or iuː in modern Japanese).

Some languages, including most dialects of Mandarin, some varieties of Wu, as well as Inland Min, have lost the stop coda, and the stop coda finals became open-vowel finals in them.

==== Groups 咸 and 深 ====
| Rhyme | Class | | 盍 | 合 | | 盍 | 狎 洽 | | 乏 | 葉 | 葉 帖 | 業 葉 帖 | 緝 | | |
| Rhyme | Division | | 一 | | | | 二 | | 三 | 三 | 三四 | 三四 | 三 | | |
| Rhyme | Rounding | | 開 | | | | 開 | | 合 | 開 | 開 | 開 | 開 | | |
| Initial | | | K | | TS | | TrSr | K | F | TrSy | TS | K | S | K | TrSy |
|---|---|---|---|---|---|---|---|---|---|---|---|---|---|---|---|
| Chinese | Cantonese | Standard | ɐp | | aːp | | | | aːt | iːp | | | ɐp | | |
| Chinese | Cantonese | Watlam | ɔp | | | | | | ɔt | iɛp | | ip | ap | | |
| Chinese | Cantonese | Taishan | ap | | | | | | at | iap | | | ip | | |
| Chinese | Hakka | Moiyen | ap | | | | | | | | iap | | ip | | əp |
| Chinese | Gan | Nanchang | ot | | ot, at | at | | | | ɛt | iɛt | | it | | ət |
| Chinese | Wu | Kaihua | ʌʔ | uʌʔ | ʌʔ | | | ʌʔ, iɛʔ | ʌʔ | iɛʔ | | | ieʔ | | ieʔ, yɛʔ |
| Chinese | Wu | Wenzhou | y, ø | | a, ø | a | | | o | i | | | ai | iai | ai |
| Chinese | Wu | Shanghai | ɐʔ | | aʔ | | | | | ɐʔ | iɪʔ | | | | əʔ |
| Chinese | Mandarin | Lianshui | oʔ | | æʔ | | | æʔ, iaʔ | æʔ | ieʔ | | | | | əʔ |
| Chinese | Mandarin | Wuhan | o | | a | | | ia, a | a | ə | iɛ | | i | | ɿ |
| Chinese | Mandarin | Beijing | ə | | a | | | ia | a | ə | iɛ | | i | | ɿ |
| Min | Northern | Wuyishan | o | | a | | | | ua | i | | | ei | i | |
| Min | Northern | Jian'ou | ɔ | | a | | | | ua | ie | | | i | | |
| Min | Central | Yong'an | ɯ | | ɒ | | | | uɒ | iɛ | ɛ | | i | | ɿ |
| Min | Eastern | Fuzhou | aʔ | | | | | | uaʔ | ieʔ | | | iʔ | eiʔ | eiʔ |
| Min | Eastern | Ningde | ap | | | | | | uak | ɛp | | | ip | ep | ɛp |
| Min | Hinghwa | Xianyou | aʔ | | | | | | aʔ | ɛʔ | ieʔ | | iʔ | | |
| Min | Southern | Choanchew | ap | | | | | | uat | iap | | | ip | | |
| Min | Southern | Changchew | ap | | | | | | uat | iap | | | ip | | |
| Min | Southern | Teochew | ap | | | | | | uak | iap | | | ip | | |
| Sino-Xenic | Japanese | Go-on | afu | ofu | afu, ofu | afu | efu | | ofu | efu | | efu, ofu | ifu | ofu | ifu |
| Sino-Xenic | Japanese | Kan-on | afu | | | | | | | efu | | | ifu | | |
| Sino-Xenic | Korean | | ap | | | | | | əp | jəp, əp | jəp, ap | jəp, əp | ip | ɯp | ip |
| Sino-Xenic | Vietnamese | | ap | | | | | | | iəp | | | əp | | |

==== Groups 山 and 臻 (open) ====
| Rhyme | Class | | 曷 | | 鎋 黠 | | 薛 | 月 薛 屑 | 迄 | 質 | | |
| Rhyme | Division | | 一 | | 二 | | 三 | 三四 | 三 | 三 | | |
| Rhyme | Rounding | | 開 | | 開 | | 開 | 開 | 開 | 開 | | |
| Initial | | | K | TS | PTrSr | K | TrSy | PTSK | K | PK | S | TrSy |
|---|---|---|---|---|---|---|---|---|---|---|---|---|
| Chinese | Cantonese | Standard | ɔːt | aːt | | | iːt | | ɐt | | | |
| Chinese | Cantonese | Watlam | ɔt | | | | iɛt | | at | | | |
| Chinese | Cantonese | Taishan | ɔt | at | | | et | | it | | | |
| Chinese | Hakka | Moiyen | ɔt | at | | | | iat | iut | it | | ət |
| Chinese | Gan | Nanchang | ot | at | | | ɛt | iɛt | it | | | ət |
| Chinese | Wu | Kaihua | ɔʔ | ʌʔ | | ɔʔ | iɛʔ | | ieʔ | | | |
| Chinese | Wu | Wenzhou | y, ø | a | | | i | | ai | i | ai | |
| Chinese | Wu | Shanghai | ɐʔ | aʔ | | | ɐʔ | iɪʔ | | | | ɐʔ |
| Chinese | Mandarin | Lianshui | oʔ | æʔ | | | ieʔ | | iʔ | | | əʔ |
| Chinese | Mandarin | Wuhan | o | a | | a, ia | ɛ | iɛ | i | | | ɿ |
| Chinese | Mandarin | Beijing | ə | a | | ia | ə | iɛ | i | | | ɿ |
| Min | Northern | Wuyishan | uai | | yai | ai | i | | əu | ei | | |
| Min | Northern | Jian'ou | uɛ | | | ai | iɛ | | i | | | |
| Min | Central | Yong'an | uɒ | uɒ, ɒ | ɒ | a | ya | e | i | | | ɿ |
| Min | Eastern | Fuzhou | aʔ | | | | ieʔ | | yʔ | eiʔ | | |
| Min | Eastern | Ningde | ak | | | | ik, ɛk | | øk | ik, ek | | |
| Min | Hinghwa | Xianyou | aʔ | | | | ɛʔ | | yʔ | iʔ | | |
| Min | Southern | Choanchew | at | | | | iɛt | | ɯt | it | | |
| Min | Southern | Changchew | at | | | | iɛt | | it | it | | |
| Min | Southern | Teochew | ak | | | | iek | | ək | ik | | |
| Sino-Xenic | Japanese | Go-on | ati | | eti | | | eti, oti | oti | iti, oti | iti | |
| Sino-Xenic | Japanese | Kan-on | atu | | | | etu | | itu | | | |
| Sino-Xenic | Korean | | al | | | | jəl | | ɯl | il | | |
| Sino-Xenic | Vietnamese | | at | | | | iət | | ət | | | |

==== Groups 山 and 臻 (closed) ====
| Rhyme | Class | | 末 | | | 黠 鎋 | 月 | 薛 | | 月 薛 屑 | 沒 | | | | 物 | 術 | | 物 質 術 |
| Rhyme | Division | | 一 | | | 二 | 三 | 三 | | 三四 | 一 | | | | 三 | 三 | | 三 |
| Rhyme | Rounding | | 合 | | | 合 | 合 | 合 | | 合 | 合 | | | | 合 | 合 | | 合 |
| Initial | | | P | T | K | K | F | TrSrSy | S | K | P | T | S | K | F | TrSy | S | K |
|---|---|---|---|---|---|---|---|---|---|---|---|---|---|---|---|---|---|---|
| Chinese | Cantonese | Standard | uːt | yːt | uːt | uaːt | aːt | yːt | | | uːt | ɵt | yːt | uɐt | ɐt | ɵt | | uɐt |
| Chinese | Cantonese | Watlam | ut | yt | ut | uɔt | ɔt | yt | | | ut | yt | | uat | at | | | uat |
| Chinese | Cantonese | Taishan | ɔt | | | at | | ut | | | ɔt | | ut | | | | | |
| Chinese | Hakka | Moiyen | at | ɔt | uɔt | uat | at | iat | | | ut | | | | | | | iut |
| Chinese | Gan | Nanchang | ot | | uot | uat | at | ot | yot | | ət | | | ut | | ət | it | |
| Chinese | Wu | Kaihua | ʌʔ | ɔʔ | uʌʔ | | ʌʔ | yoʔ | iɛʔ | yɛʔ | ʌʔ | uʌʔ | | | ʌʔ | yeʔ | | |
| Chinese | Wu | Wenzhou | ø | | o | | | y | | | ø | | | y | ai | y | | |
| Chinese | Wu | Shanghai | ɐʔ | | uɐʔ | | aʔ | oʔ | iɪʔ | ioʔ | ɐʔ | | | uəʔ | ɐʔ | | uoʔ | ioʔ |
| Chinese | Mandarin | Lianshui | oʔ | | | uæʔ | æʔ | oʔ | yeʔ | | ɔʔ | əʔ | ɔʔ | uəʔ | əʔ | uəʔ | iɔʔ | yeʔ |
| Chinese | Mandarin | Wuhan | o | | | ua | a | ye | iɛ | yɛ | u | ou | | u | | y | i | y |
| Chinese | Mandarin | Beijing | uo | | | ua | a | uo | yɛ | | uo | u | | | | | y | |
| Min | Northern | Wuyishan | uai | ui | uai | | | y | | | o | ui | | | | y | əu | |
| Min | Northern | Jian'ou | uɛ | ɔ | ua | | uɛ | yɛ | | | ɔ | u | o | | | y | | |
| Min | Central | Yong'an | uɒ | | | | | ye | e | ye | ue | | | | | yi | | |
| Min | Eastern | Fuzhou | uaʔ | | | | | uɔʔ | | uɔʔ, yɔʔ | uɔʔ | ouʔ | | uɔʔ | uʔ | | | |
| Min | Eastern | Ningde | uok | | | | | uk | | ɔk, yk | uk | ɔk | | | uk | | | |
| Min | Hinghwa | Xianyou | uoʔ | | | | | yøʔ | | | uoʔ | | | | | | | |
| Min | Southern | Choanchew | uat | uat, ut | uat | uat, ut | uat | | | uat, iɛt | ut | | | | | | | |
| Min | Southern | Changchew | uat | uat, ut | uat | uat, ut | uat | | | uat, iɛt | ut | | | | | | | |
| Min | Southern | Teochew | uak | uk | uak | uk | uak | | | | uk | | | | | | | |
| Sino-Xenic | Japanese | Go-on | ati | | wati | weti | oti | eti | | oti, weti | oti | | | | uti, oti | juti | | uti, iti, oti |
| Sino-Xenic | Japanese | Kan-on | atu | | watu | | atu | etu | | wetu | otu | | | | utu | jutu | | utu, itu |
| Sino-Xenic | Korean | | al | | wal | | əl, al | jəl | | wəl, jəl | ol, al | ol, ul | | ol | ul | | | jul, ul |
| Sino-Xenic | Vietnamese | | at | wat | | | iət, at | wiət | | | ot | | | | ət | uət | | |

==== Groups 宕, 曾 and 深 (open) ====
| Rhyme | Class | | | 藥 | | 鐸 | 德 | | 職 | | 陌 麥 | | 陌 昔 錫 | 昔 |
| Rhyme | Division | | | 三 | | 一 | 一 | | 三 | | 二 | | 三四 | 三 |
| Rhyme | Rounding | | | 開 | | 開 | 開 | | 開 | | 開 | | 開 | 開 |
| Initial | | | | SK | TrSy | PTSK | P | TSK | TrSy | K | P | TrSrK | PTKS | TrSy |
|---|---|---|---|---|---|---|---|---|---|---|---|---|---|---|
| Chinese | Cantonese | Standard | | œːk | | ɔːk | ɐk | | ɪk | | aːk | | ɪk, ɛːk | |
| Chinese | Cantonese | Watlam | | a | | uk | ak | | ɛk | | a | | ɛk | |
| Chinese | Cantonese | Taishan | | iak | | ɔk | ak | | et | | ak | | et, iak | iak |
| Chinese | Hakka | Moiyen | | iɔk | ɔk | | ɛt | | ət | | ak | | it, iak | ak |
| Chinese | Gan | Nanchang | | iɔʔ | ɔʔ | | ɛʔ | | it | | aʔ | | it, iaʔ | aʔ |
| Chinese | Wu | Kaihua | | iɛʔ | | ɔʔ | ʌʔ | | ieʔ | | ʌʔ | | ieʔ | |
| Chinese | Wu | Wenzhou | | ia | a | o | ai | e | ei | iai | a | | ei | |
| Chinese | Wu | Shanghai | | iaʔ | aʔ | oʔ | | ɐʔ | | iɪʔ | aʔ | | iɪʔ | ɐʔ |
| Chinese | Mandarin | Lianshui | | iaʔ | aʔ | | ɔʔ | əʔ | | iʔ | ɔʔ | əʔ | iʔ | əʔ |
| Chinese | Mandarin | Wuhan | | io | o | | ə | | ɿ | i | ə | | i | ɿ |
| Chinese | Mandarin | Beijing | lit | ye | uo | uo, ə | uo | ə | ɿ | i | uo | ə | i | ɿ |
| Chinese | Mandarin | Beijing | col | iau | au | | ei | | — | | ai | ai, iɛ | — | |
| Min | Northern | Wuyishan | | yo | | o | ie | | i | | ie | | ei, ia | i, ia |
| Min | Northern | Jian'ou | | iɔ | | ɔ | ɛ | | i | | ɛ | | i, ia | |
| Min | Central | Yong'an | | iɯ | | aɯ | a | | ɿ | i | ɒ, a | | i, iɒ | ɿ |
| Min | Eastern | Fuzhou | | uɔʔ | | ouʔ | eiʔ | aiʔ | eiʔ | | eiʔ, aiʔ | | eiʔ | eiʔ |
| Min | Eastern | Ningde | | yk | | ɔk | ɛk | | ek, ik | | ɛk | | ek, ik | ek |
| Min | Hinghwa | Xianyou | | yøʔ | | ɒʔ | ɛʔ | | iʔ | | ɛʔ | | iʔ, ɛʔ | iʔ |
| Min | Southern | Choanchew | | iɔk | | ak, ɔk | ik | ɯk | ik, it | ik | | | | |
| Min | Southern | Changchew | | iak | | ak, ɔk | ik | ik | ik, it | ik | | | | |
| Min | Southern | Teochew | | iak | | ak | ek | | | | | | | |
| Sino-Xenic | Japanese | Go-on | | aku | jaku | aku | oku | | iki | oku | jaku | | | |
| Sino-Xenic | Japanese | Kan-on | | jaku | | aku | oku | | joku | | aku | | eki | |
| Sino-Xenic | Korean | | | jak | | ak | uk | ɯk | ik | ɯk | ɛk | | jək | |
| Sino-Xenic | Vietnamese | | | ɨək | | ak | | | ɨk | ak | ajk | | ijk | |

==== Groups 宕, 曾, 深, 江 and 通 (closed) ====
| Rhyme | Class | | | 鐸 | 德 職 | 麥 | 昔 | 覺 | | | | 屋 | 屋 沃 | 屋 燭 | | | |
| Rhyme | Division | | | 一 | 一三 | 二 | 三 | 二 | | | | 一 | 一 | 三 | | | |
| Rhyme | Rounding | | | 合 | 合 | 合 | 合 | 合 | | | | 合 | 合 | 合 | | | |
| Initial | | | | K | K | K | K | Sr | Tr | P | K | P | TSK | F | TrSy | S | K |
|---|---|---|---|---|---|---|---|---|---|---|---|---|---|---|---|---|---|
| Chinese | Cantonese | Standard | | uɔːk | uɐŋ | | ɪk | œːk | | ɔːk | | uk | | | | | |
| Chinese | Cantonese | Watlam | | uk | uok | ua | uɛk | uk | | | ak | ɔk | | | | | |
| Chinese | Cantonese | Taishan | | ɔk | ak | | et | ɔk | | | | ək | | | | | |
| Chinese | Hakka | Moiyen | | ɔk | ɛt | ak | it | ɔk | | | | uk | | | | iuk | |
| Chinese | Gan | Nanchang | | ɔʔ | uɛʔ | uaʔ | yʔ | ɔʔ | | | | uʔ | | | | | iuʔ |
| Chinese | Wu | Kaihua | | uʌʔ | | | yeʔ | iɔʔ | | ɔʔ | | ɔʔ, əʔ | | əʔ | yoʔ | əʔ | yoʔ |
| Chinese | Wu | Wenzhou | | o | ai | o | y | yo | | o | | u | əu, u | u | əu | yo, iəu | |
| Chinese | Wu | Shanghai | | oʔ | | | ioʔ, yiʔ | oʔ | | | | oʔ | | | | | ioʔ |
| Chinese | Mandarin | Lianshui | | uaʔ | ɔʔ | | ieʔ | uaʔ | | aʔ | aʔ, iaʔ | ɔʔ | | | | | iɔʔ |
| Chinese | Mandarin | Wuhan | | o | uə | | y | o | | | o, io | u | ou, u | u | ou | | iou |
| Chinese | Mandarin | Beijing | lit | uo | | | i | uo | | | ye | u | | | | | y |
| Chinese | Mandarin | Beijing | col | — | | | | | | au | iau | — | | | iou | | — |
| Min | Northern | Wuyishan | | o | ui | | ia | o | | | | u | | | əu | | |
| Min | Northern | Jian'ou | | ua | o | | i | ɔ | | | | u | | | y | | |
| Min | Central | Yong'an | | ɯ | ue | ɯ | iɒ | aɯ | | | | u | u, ɒu | u | y | | |
| Min | Eastern | Fuzhou | | uɔʔ | | eiʔ | iʔ | ouʔ | | auʔ | ouʔ | uʔ | | | øyʔ, yʔ | | |
| Min | Eastern | Ningde | | ɔk | | ɛk | ik | ɔk | | | | uk, ok | | | yk, øk | | |
| Min | Hinghwa | Xianyou | | ɒʔ | | ɛʔ | yʔ | ɒʔ | | | aʔ | ɒʔ | | | yøʔ | | |
| Min | Southern | Choanchew | | ɔk | | ik | | ɔk | | ak | | ɔk, ak | | | iɔk | | |
| Min | Southern | Changchew | | ɔk | | ik | | ɔk | | ak | | ɔk, ak | | | iɔk | | |
| Min | Southern | Teochew | | uak | ok | uak | | | | ak | | ok, ak | | | ok, iok | | iok |
| Sino-Xenic | Japanese | Go-on | | waku | oku | jaku | | aku | | oku | aku | oku | | uku, oku | iku, uku, oku | | |
| Sino-Xenic | Japanese | Kan-on | | waku | oku | waku | eki | aku | | | | oku | | uku, joku | iku, juku, joku | | |
| Sino-Xenic | Korean | | | wak | ok, uk | øk | jək | ak | | | | ok | | | juk, uk, ok, jok | | |
| Sino-Xenic | Vietnamese | | | wak | | wajk | ijk | ak | | | | əwk | | uwk | | | |
