= Elizabeth Fisher =

Elizabeth Fisher may refer to:

- Beth Fisher (artist) (born 1944), American artist
- Beth Fisher (field hockey), Welsh sports reporter, presenter and field hockey player
- Elizabeth Bland, née Fisher, Hebrew scholar
- Elizabeth F. Fisher (1873–1941), American geologist
- Elizabeth Gault Fisher (1909–2000), American entomologist
- Elizabeth Holmes Fisher (1867–1955), American art collector
- Elizabeth Fisher (journalist) (1924–1982), American journalist
- Elizabeth Fisher (figure skater), Canadian figure skater
- Elizabeth Fisher (neuroscientist), British neuroscientist
- Elizabeth Campbell Fisher Clay (1871–1959), née Fisher, American artist and painter
- Elizabeth Fisher, a character in Gossip Girl
- Elizabeth Taylor (1932–2011), married name Fisher, actress
- Zachary and Elizabeth Fisher, founders of the Fisher House Foundation
- Elizabeth Fisher Brewster (1862–1955), née Fisher, American Methodist missionary

== See also ==
- Betty Fisher (disambiguation)
- Fisher (surname)
