= William N. Brewster =

William Nesbitt Brewster
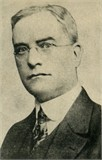
- Missionary to China
- Born: December 5, 1862; Clark County, Ohio United States
- Died: November 22, 1916 (aged 53); Ohio, United States
- Education: Boston University
- Title: Evangelist, Mission Administrator
- Spouse: Elizabeth Fisher Brewster
- Parent(s): Samuel Brewster, Rebecca Nesbitt Brewster

William Nesbitt Brewster (Chinese: 蒲魯士) (December 5, 1862 – November 22, 1916) was an American Protestant Christian missionary to China. Brewster spent 26 years in China (1890–1916) and translated the New Testament into the Hinghua language by adopting the Hinghwa Romanized writing system. Brewster is remembered today as one of the early founders of the Hinghwa Methodist Church.

== Early life and mission to China ==
Born in Clark County, Ohio, Brewster graduated from Boston University in 1888 with a Doctorate in Theology. In 1889, the Methodist Episcopal Church dispatched Brewster to Singapore with the status of a missionary, however due to his difficulty in acclimatizing to that region he was redirected to the Foochow Church Mission Station instead. It was during this period at the Foochow Mission where Brewster became acquainted to Miss Elizabeth Fisher and they subsequently married.

== Missionary work in the Hinghwa Prefecture ==
In 1890, Brewster was transferred to the Hinghwa (present day Putian) Prefecture to evangelize at that region. It was during this period when Brewster first began learning the local Hinghwa language and, in order to facilitate the missionary work, developed the Hinghwa Romanized alphabet. From 1892 to 1900, Brewster translated the New Testament Bible into the Hinghwa language and set up a local store known as the Hinghua Industrial Mission Press where the printing of Bibles were conducted. In his leisure time, he established facilities such as a Gospel Bookstore, Western Secondary school (still in existence today), and the Hanjiang Xingren Hospital (predecessor of the present day Hanjiang District Hospital). Brewster also created a local orphanage center, smoking rehabilitation facility, social welfare center and also established several industries such as the Xingshan Shipping Company (興善輪船公司), a Flour factory. The Brewsters also participated in the great Hinghwa revival during 1909 which left a lasting impact on Chinese Christians such as John Sung who would later become a pastor and evangelist. Brewster also exported local specialty products such as the Litchi chinensis to the United States and helped organize the Hinghwa church members in their plans to immigrate to the Sarawak region of Sibu beginning from 1912. In 1916, Brewster returned to the United States and died a few months later at the age of 53.

== Works ==
- The Evolution of New China (1907)
- The Cost of the Christian Conquest (1908)
- A Modern Pentecost in South China (1909)
- Straws from the Hinghwa Harvest (1910)
- The Methodist Man’s Burden (1913)
