= Shihu, Lianshui County =

Shihu 石湖镇
- Town
- Location in Jiangsu Shihu (China)
- Coordinates: 33°56′18″N 119°37′14″E
- Country: People's Republic of China
- Province: Jiangsu
- Prefecture-level city: Huai'an
- County: Lianshui County
- Time zone: UTC+8 (China Standard)

Shihu (Chinese: 石湖; pinyin: Shíhú) is a town in Lianshui County, Jiangsu province, China. As of 2020, it administers the following three residential neighborhoods and 14 villages:

Neighborhoods

- Shihu
- Guoyuan (果园)
- Sixing (四兴)

Villages

- Waikou Village (外口村)
- Wafang Village (瓦房村)
- Qizhuang Village (齐庄村)
- Wulijing Village (五里井村)
- Shiqipu Village (十七堡村)
- Louzhuang Village (楼庄村)
- Zhujiawei Village (朱家圩村)
- Sanqi Village (三旗村)
- Fangwei Village (方圩村)
- Zhanggu Village (张顾村)
- Xueji Village (薛集村)
- Xuma Village (徐马村)
- Dongxing Village (东兴村)
- Huaize Village (淮泽村)
