= Xianyou dialect =

Pu–Xian Min Chinese dialect

Putian
- Sing-iú-uā / 仙遊話
- Native to: Southern China
- Region: Xianyou, Putian, Fujian
- Language family: Sino-Tibetan: Sinitic; Chinese; Min; Coastal Min; Pu–Xian Min; Putian
- Early forms: Proto-Sino-Tibetan: Old Chinese (Note: Min is believed to have split from Old Chinese, rather than Middle Chinese like other varieties of Chinese.); Proto-Min

Language codes
- ISO 639-3: –
- Glottolog: xian1252
- Linguasphere: 79-AAA-ida

Xianyou dialect
- Traditional Chinese: 仙遊話
- Simplified Chinese: 仙游话
Transcriptions
Standard Mandarin
- Hanyu Pinyin: Xiānyóuhuà
Pu-Xian Min
- Hinghwa BUC: Sing-iú-uā ([ɬiŋ˨˨ iu˨˦ ua˨˩])

The Xianyou dialect (Pu–Xian Min: Sing-iú-uā / 仙遊話; [ɬiŋ˨ iu˨˦ ua˨˩]) is a dialect of Pu–Xian Min Chinese spoken in Xianyou, Putian in the southeast coast of Fujian province, China.

== Phonology ==
The Xianyou dialect has 15 initials, 45 rimes and 7 tones.

=== Initials ===
		Bilabial	Alveolar	Lateral	Velar	Glottal
Stop	Unaspirated voiceless	p 巴	t 打		k 家	ʔ 烏
Stop	Aspirated voiceless	pʰ 彭	tʰ 他		kʰ 卡	
Nasal		m 麻	n 拿		ŋ 雅	
Fricative	Voiceless			ɬ 沙		h 下
Fricative	Voiced	β*			ɣ*	
Affricate	Unaspirated voiceless		ts 渣			
Affricate	Aspirated voiceless		tsʰ 査			
Approximant				l 拉		

=== Rimes ===
a 鴉	ã 平	au 拗		aŋ 江	aʔ 壓
ɒ 奥	ɒ̃ 泛			ɒŋ 王	ɒʔ 屋
o 科		ɔu 烏			
e 裔		ai 愛		ɛŋ 煙	ɛʔ 黑
ø 改					
				ŋ 伓	
i 衣	ĩ 反	iu 油	iũ 張	iŋ 引	iʔ 益
ia 夜	iã 丙	ieu 要		iɛŋ 鹽	iɛʔ 葉
u 夫		ui 位	uĩ 風		
ua 画		uoi 歪	uã 搬	uaŋ 碗	uoʔ 活
y 余	ỹ 頓			yŋ 恩	yʔ 役
ya 鵝			yã 然	yøŋ 羊	yøʔ 藥

=== Tones ===
No.	1	2	3	4	5	6	7
Tones	dark level 陰平	light level 陽平	rising 上聲	dark departing 陰去	light departing 陽去	dark entering 陰入	light entering 陽入
Tone contour	˥˦˦ (544)	˨˦ (24)	˧˧˨ (332)	˥˨ (52)	˨˩ (21)	ʔ˨ (ʔ2)	ʔ˦ (ʔ4)
Example Hanzi	詩巴	時爬	始把	試霸	寺罷	濕北	實拔

=== Assimilation ===
	Coda of the Former Syllable	Initial of the Latter Syllable	Assimilation	Coda of the Former Syllable	Initial of the Latter Syllable
Group A	Open syllable	/p/, /pʰ/	→	remain unchanged	/β/, /ɣ/
Group A	Open syllable	/t/, /tʰ/, /ts/, /tsʰ/, /ɬ/	→	remain unchanged	/l/
Group A	Open syllable	/k/, /kʰ/, /h/	→	remain unchanged	/ɣ/
Group B	/-ŋ/ (nasal coda)	/p/, /pʰ/	→	/-m/	/m/
Group B	/-ŋ/ (nasal coda)	/t/, /tʰ/, /ts/, /tsʰ/, /l/, /ɬ/	→	/-n/	/n/, remain unchanged
Group B	/-ŋ/ (nasal coda)	/k/, /kʰ/, /h/, null initial	→	remain unchanged, or /-n/	/ŋ/, /n/
Group B	/-ŋ/ (nasal coda)	/m/, /n/, /ŋ/	→	/-m/, /-n/, /-ŋ/	remain unchanged
Group C	/-ʔ/ (glottal coda)	/p/, /pʰ/, /m/	→	/-p̚/	remain unchanged
Group C	/-ʔ/ (glottal coda)	/t/, /tʰ/, /ts/, /tsʰ/, /ɬ/, /l/, /n/	→	/-t̚/	remain unchanged
Group C	/-ʔ/ (glottal coda)	/k/, /kʰ/, /ŋ/, /h/	→	/-k̚/	remain unchanged
Group C	/-ʔ/ (glottal coda)	null initial	→	/-ʔ/	remain unchanged
Group E	Open syllable	/m/, /n/, /ŋ/	→	nasalization	remain unchanged
Group E	Open syllable	nasalized rime	→	nasalization	remain unchanged
Group E	Open syllable	nasalized rime	→	remain unchanged	/n/

=== Tone sandhi ===
The Xianyou dialect has extremely extensive tone sandhi rules: in an utterance, only the last syllable pronounced is not affected by the rules.

The two-syllable tonal sandhi rules are shown in the table below (the rows give the first syllable's original citation tone, while the columns give the citation tone of the second syllable):

Tone sandhi of the first syllable
	dark level 544	light level 24	rising 332	dark departing 52	light departing 21	dark entering ʔ2	light entering ʔ4
dark level 544	24	22		24			22
light level 24	22			44	52		22
rising 332	24	44	24				
dark departing 52	44		33	44	52		44
light departing 21	22			44	52		22
dark entering ʔ2	ʔ4						
light entering ʔ4	ʔ2			ʔ4			ʔ2
