= Elizabeth Fisher Brewster =

American Methodist missionary (1862–1955)

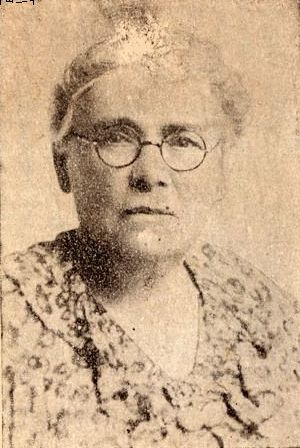
- Methodist missionaries to China
- Born: 1862 (United States) London, Ohio
- Died: March 17, 1955 (United States) Cincinnati, Ohio

Elizabeth Fisher Brewster (Chinese: 蒲星氏; 1862 – March 17, 1955) was an American Methodist missionary to China for 65 years, and was known in China as "the Shepherdess Mother of Hinghwa."

== Life ==
Elizabeth Fisher was born in London, Ohio. She was appointed a Chinese missionary at the age of 22. She went to Fuzhou in 1884, and was married to Rev. William N. Brewster (蒲鲁士) in 1890. The couple established headquarters in Xinghua Prefecture (today Putian) as the first foreign missionaries there. The Christian community they founded had 200 churches and more than 40,000 members in 1950.

Mrs. Brewster had carried on as district superintendent after her husband's death in 1916. In 1934, she was officially retired by the Methodist Board of Missions, but she continued to serve until the assumption of power by the Communists in 1949, when she returned to the United States.

Her mission founded schools, an orphanage, and a hospital, and worked on the improvement of roads and other development projects. She also wrote many religious and school texts in the Xinghua language, and served as editor of The Revivalist, and started a women's Bible movement that spread to other parts of Asia.

She died on March 17, 1955, in Cincinnati, at age 93.
