= Betty Fisher =

Betty Fisher may refer to:

- Bettie Fisher, Australian Aboriginal jazz singer and theatre manager
- Betty Fisher (badminton), player in Welsh International
- Betty Fisher and Other Stories, French drama film

== See also ==
- Elizabeth Fisher (disambiguation)
