= Front and back =

From an articulatory perspective, phonemes can be described as front or back. Front vowels refer to vowels articulated towards the front of the mouth. This can either refer to vowels that are more front than central or, more rarely, only to fully front vowels, i.e. the ones articulated as far forward as possible in the mouth. A similar distinction holds for back vowels, which can refer to vowels that are more back than central or, more rarely, only to fully back vowels, i.e. the ones articulated as far back as possible in the mouth. However, acoustically there is little difference between a central vowel and a back vowel, with the result that the two are frequently grouped together into an even broader category of "back vowels", or a category of "non-front vowels".

A back consonant features all consonants whose place of articulation is in the soft palate (velum) or further back, including velar, uvular, pharyngeal, and glottal consonants. From the perspective of primary places of articulation, this includes all of the laryngeal consonants and some of the dorsal consonants (specifically, excluding palatal consonants).

A front consonant features all consonants that are not back consonants, including palatal, coronal, and labial consonants.

Front and back vowels are also known as acute and grave vowels, respectively. For consonants, however, front/back are not synonyms of acute/grave. Grave consonants include both back consonants and labial consonants, while acute consonants include all front consonants except labial consonants. This suggests that a three-way division between labial, acute and back (vaguely speaking, "P-like", "T-like" and "K-like", respectively) might be useful in some contexts.

== See also ==
- Fronted (phonetics)
