= Beth Fisher (artist) =

American artist (born 1944)

Beth Fisher (née Lovejoy; born 1944) is an artist, printmaker and member of the Royal Scottish Academy and the Society of Scottish Artists. She was born in Portland, Maine and studied at the University of Wisconsin and at the Ruskin School of Drawing and Fine Art, Oxford. She moved to the United Kingdom from the United States in the 1960s to study in Oxford for a year, and married her husband Nick Fisher in 1967. After completing postgraduate studies in the United States, they both returned to the United Kingdom in 1970, moving to Glasgow in 1971 and Aberdeen in 1976. Fisher has worked at both Glasgow Print Studio and Peacock Visual Arts (formerly Peacock Printmakers) in Aberdeen, and helped to establish both workshops. She was a founder member of Glasgow Print Studio in 1972, and was responsible for co-running the workshop for the first few years, with Sheena McGregor. She was elected an Associate member of the Royal Scottish Academy in 1989, in the membership category for printmakers, shortly after the academy introduced the category.

== Teaching ==
Fisher taught at several Scottish art schools before her retirement in 2004: Glasgow School of Art, Duncan of Jordanstone College of Art, Dundee and Grays School of Art, Aberdeen. She also lectured at Oxford Polytechnic (now Oxford Brookes University) in the early 1970s.

== Artistic career ==
Depictions of self and family have been central to Fisher's work, examining domestic and personal issues through a feminist perspective with honesty. She often uses herself and her family as models. Art history has been an influence on her work, as has religious iconography, and drawing has been a central part of her artistic practice.

The Canopy Series (1987) draws on experiences from the artist's own family. It was first exhibited in Glasgow at the Third Eye Centre, and later in Aberdeen, Dundee, at the 10th International Bradford Biennale, Plymouth, Cardiff and Orkney.

Fisher's Vigil I series (1999–2000) is a suite of prints made using the same four plates, inked differently with their sequence of printing and overprinting altered each time to produce unique prints. The theme is the artist's husband's cardiac disease, both the tests, treatments and medical procedures he underwent as well as Fisher's fears as his wife and carer. The Vigil II series takes Fisher's daughter's battle with breast cancer as the subject.

A significant exhibition of Fisher's work was Grisaille Legacy in 2010. The show began at the Royal Scottish Academy in January 2010 and subsequently toured to Space Gallery, University of Portsmouth and New Hall Art Collection, Cambridge. It consisted of monumental scale figurative drawings, inspired by classical works but using the artist's personal and family life as the subject. The powerful, large-scale drawings include images of long-term mental illness, physical decline and aging, and the effects of a cancer diagnosis in the family. The series was begun during a drawing project funded by the Arts & Humanities Research Council (AHRC) in 200-2001 and completed after Fisher's retirement in 2004.

== Selected collections ==
- New Hall Art Collection, University of Cambridge
- Royal Scottish Academy of Art & Architecture
- National Galleries of Scotland
