= Lianshui County =

Lianshui 涟水县 Lienshui
- County
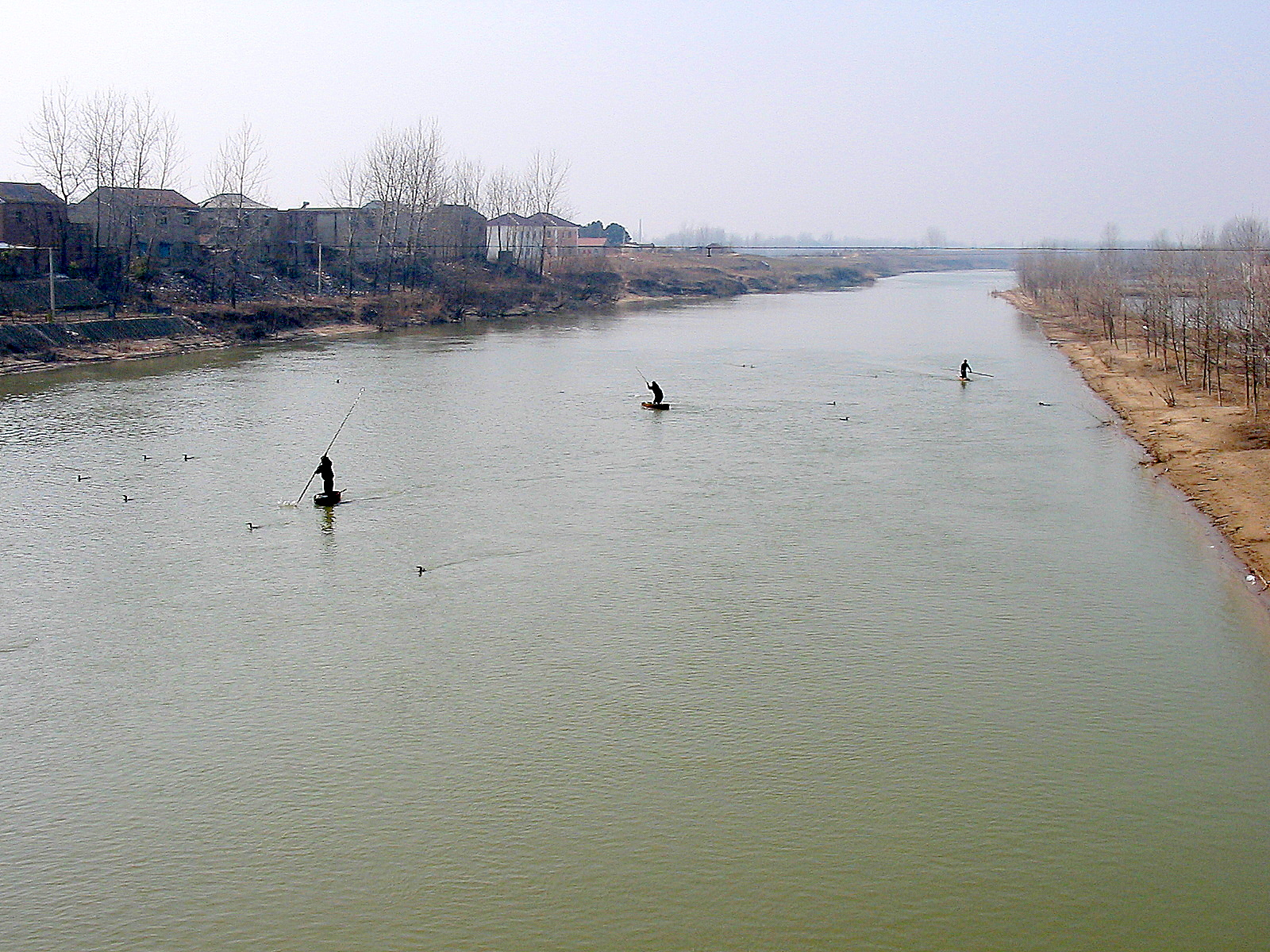
- View of the waterway in Lianshui County

- Location in Jiangsu
- Coordinates: 33°51′40″N 119°19′19″E
- Country: People's Republic of China
- Province: Jiangsu
- Prefecture-level city: Huai'an

Area
  - Total: 1,678 km^{2} (648 sq mi)

Population (2018)
  - Total: 1,154,000
  - Density: 687.7/km^{2} (1,781/sq mi)
- Time zone: UTC+8 (China Standard)
- Postal code: 223400
- Area code: 0517
- Website: lianshui.gov.cn

Lianshui County (simplified Chinese: 涟水县; traditional Chinese: 漣水縣; pinyin: Liánshuǐ Xiàn) is under the administration of Huai'an, Jiangsu province, China. The northernmost county-level division of Huai'an, it borders the prefecture-level cities of Lianyungang to the north, Yancheng to the east, and Suqian to the west.

== Administrative divisions ==
At present, Lianshui County has 17 towns and 2 townships.

17 towns

- Liancheng (涟城镇)
- Gaogou (高沟镇)
- Tangji (唐集镇)
- Baotan (保滩镇)
- Dadong (大东镇)
- Wugang (五港镇)
- Liangcha (梁岔镇)
- Shihu (石湖镇)
- Zhuma (朱码镇)
- Chamiao (岔庙镇)
- Qianjin (前进镇)
- Nanji (南集镇)
- Yixing (义兴镇)
- Chengji (成集镇)
- Hongyao (红窑镇)
- Chenshi (陈师镇)
- Donghuji (东胡集镇)

2 townships

- Xuji (徐集乡)
- Huangying (黄营乡)

== Climate ==
The average annual temperature in Lianshui County is 14.8 °C (58.6 °F). The extreme maximum temperature was 39.1 °C (102.4 °F) on 7 August 1966, and the extreme minimum temperature was −20.9 °C (−5.6 °F) on 6 February 1969. The average annual precipitation is 994.1 mm (39.14 in)

Climate data for Lianshui, elevation 9 m (30 ft), (1991–2020 normals, extremes 1957–present)
Month	Jan	Feb	Mar	Apr	May	Jun	Jul	Aug	Sep	Oct	Nov	Dec	Year
Record high °C (°F)	19.0 (66.2)	25.4 (77.7)	31.7 (89.1)	33.7 (92.7)	36.1 (97.0)	36.5 (97.7)	38.4 (101.1)	39.1 (102.4)	35.3 (95.5)	36.2 (97.2)	30.0 (86.0)	22.5 (72.5)	39.1 (102.4)
Mean daily maximum °C (°F)	5.9 (42.6)	8.7 (47.7)	13.8 (56.8)	20.2 (68.4)	25.3 (77.5)	28.9 (84.0)	30.9 (87.6)	30.4 (86.7)	26.8 (80.2)	21.9 (71.4)	15.1 (59.2)	8.3 (46.9)	19.7 (67.4)
Daily mean °C (°F)	1.4 (34.5)	3.7 (38.7)	8.4 (47.1)	14.5 (58.1)	19.9 (67.8)	24.0 (75.2)	27.0 (80.6)	26.5 (79.7)	22.2 (72.0)	16.5 (61.7)	9.8 (49.6)	3.5 (38.3)	14.8 (58.6)
Mean daily minimum °C (°F)	−1.9 (28.6)	0.0 (32.0)	4.0 (39.2)	9.6 (49.3)	15.1 (59.2)	20.0 (68.0)	24.0 (75.2)	23.5 (74.3)	18.6 (65.5)	12.2 (54.0)	5.8 (42.4)	−0.1 (31.8)	10.9 (51.6)
Record low °C (°F)	−13.5 (7.7)	−20.9 (−5.6)	−10.6 (12.9)	−2.6 (27.3)	3.8 (38.8)	11.9 (53.4)	15.5 (59.9)	14.2 (57.6)	7.0 (44.6)	−0.3 (31.5)	−7.1 (19.2)	−14.3 (6.3)	−20.9 (−5.6)
Average precipitation mm (inches)	26.4 (1.04)	31.1 (1.22)	41.8 (1.65)	47.6 (1.87)	70.9 (2.79)	144.0 (5.67)	221.1 (8.70)	209.5 (8.25)	86.4 (3.40)	44.5 (1.75)	46.0 (1.81)	24.8 (0.98)	994.1 (39.13)
Average precipitation days (≥ 0.1 mm)	5.8	6.7	7.3	7.6	9.0	9.1	14.0	12.5	8.1	6.3	6.4	5.1	97.9
Average snowy days	3.0	2.5	0.9	0	0	0	0	0	0	0	0.5	1.0	7.9
Average relative humidity (%)	71	71	69	69	72	76	84	86	81	76	74	71	75
Mean monthly sunshine hours	148.4	145.7	181.5	203.2	213.9	177.0	184.7	195.3	186.8	187.2	157.5	155.4	2,136.6
Percentage possible sunshine	47	47	49	52	49	41	42	47	51	54	51	51	48
Source: China Meteorological Administration

== Notable persons ==
- Zhu Hailun
- Zhu Xiangzhong
