= Hinghwa Romanized =

Hinghwa Romanized Hing-hua̍ báⁿ-uā-ci̍
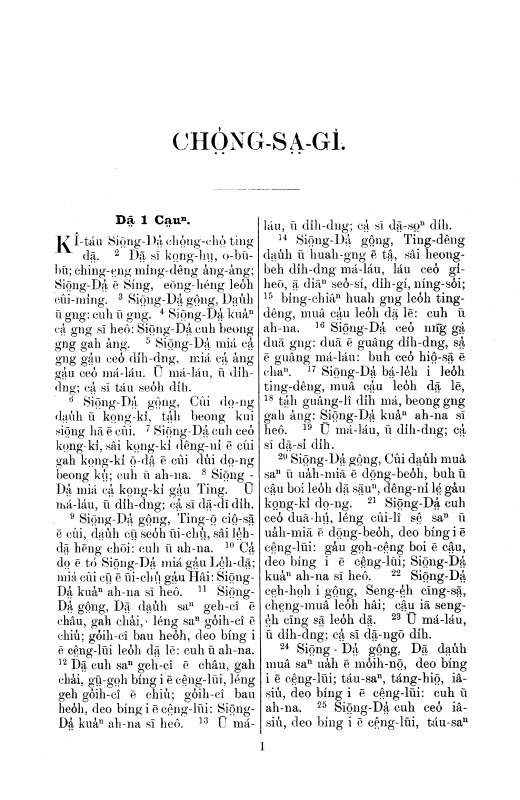
- Bible in Hinghwa (Xinghua) Romanized (Genesis), published by the British and Foreign Bible Society.
- Script type: alphabet ic
- Creator: William N. Brewster
- Period: 1890 — 1950
- Languages: Putian dialect of the Pu-Xian Min language

Related scripts
- Parent systems: Pe̍h-ōe-jī, Foochow Romanized: Hinghwa Romanized

Hinghwa Romanized, also known as Hing-hua̍ báⁿ-uā-ci̍ (興化平話字) or Báⁿ-uā-ci̍ (平話字), is a Latin alphabet of the Putian dialect of Pu-Xian Min language. It was invented by William N. Brewster (蒲魯士), an American Methodist pioneer missionary in Hinghwa (modern Putian) in 1890.

== Writing system ==
=== Alphabet ===
Hinghwa Romanized has 23 letters: a a̤ b c ch d e e̤ g h i k l m n ng o o̤ p s t u ṳ.

Puxian Min Initial Chart
		Bilabial	Alveolar	Lateral	Velar	Glottal
Plosive	unaspirated	p 巴 (b)	t 打 (d)		k 家 (g)	ʔ 烏
Plosive	aspirated	pʰ 彭 (p)	tʰ 他 (t)		kʰ 卡 (k)	
Nasals		m 麻 (m)	n 拿 (n)		ŋ 雅 (ng)	
Fricatives	voiceless			ɬ 沙 (s)		h 下 (h)
Fricatives	voiced					
Affricates	unaspirated		ts 渣 (c)			
Affricates	aspirated		tsʰ 査 (ch)			
Approximant				l 拉 (l)		

=== Finals ===
	Vowel	Diphthong	Nasal	Glottal
no glide	a 鴉 (a)	au 拗 (au)	aŋ 王 (ang)	aʔ 壓 (ah)
no glide	ɒ 奥 (o̤)		ɒŋ 用 (o̤ng)	ɒʔ 屋 (o̤h)
no glide	o 科 (eo)	ɔu 烏 (o)	oŋ 温 (eong)	oʔ 熨 (eoh)
no glide	e 裔 (a̤)	ai 愛 (ai)	ɛŋ 煙 (eng)	ɛʔ 黑 (eh)
no glide	œ 改 (e̤)		œŋ 換 (e̤ng)	œʔ 郁 (e̤h)
no glide			ŋ 伓 (ng)	
/-i-/	i 衣 (i)	iu 油 (iu)	iŋ 引 (ing)	iʔ 益 (ih)
/-i-/	ia 夜 (ia)	iau 要 (a̤u)	iaŋ 鹽 (iang)	iaʔ 葉 (iah)
/-u-/	u 夫 (u)	ui 位 (ui)	uŋ 黄 (ng)	
/-u-/	ua 画 (ua)	ue 歪 (oi)	uaŋ 碗 (uang)	uaʔ 活 (uah)
/-y-/	y 余 (ṳ)		yŋ 恩 (ṳng)	yʔ 役 (ṳh)
/-y-/	yɒ 安 (io̤ⁿ)		yɒŋ 羊 (io̤ng)	yɒʔ 藥 (io̤h)

=== Tone ===
Tone	Ing-báⁿ 陰平	Ing-siō̤ng 陰上	Ing-kṳ̍ 陰去	Ing-ci̍h 陰入	Ió̤ng-báⁿ 陽平	Ió̤ng-kṳ̍ 陽去	Ió̤ng-ci̍h 陽入
Hinghwa Romanized	none (a)	ˆ (â)	ˈ (a̍)	none (ah)	́ (á)	¯ (ā)	ˈ (a̍h)
Putian	˥˧˧ (533)	˦˥˧ (453)	˦˨ (42)	ʔ˨˩ (ʔ21)	˩˧ (13)	˩ (11)	ʔ˦ (ʔ4)
Xianyou	˥˦˦ (544)	˧˧˨ (332)	˥˨ (52)	ʔ˨ (ʔ2)	˨˦ (24)	˨˩ (21)	ʔ˦ (ʔ4)

=== Example text ===
Tai̍-che̤ ū Dō̤, Dō̤ gah Siō̤ng-Da̤̍ dó̤ng-cāi, Dō̤ cuh sī Siō̤ng-Da̤̍. Ca̤̍ Dō̤ ta̍i-che̤ gah Sio̤ng-Da̤̍ dó̤ng-cāi. Māng-beo̍h sī ciā da̤u̍h I cho̤̍ ē; hang pī cho̤̍, beo̍ seo̍h-ā̤uⁿ ng-sī ciā da̤u̍h I cho̤̍ ē.

太初有道，道佮上帝同在，道就是上帝。這道太初佮上帝同在。萬物是借著伊造兮，含被造兮，無一樣呣是借著伊造兮。

In the beginning was the Word, and the Word was with God, and the Word was God. The same was in the beginning with God. All things were made by him; and without him was not any thing made that was made. (John 1:1-3 KJV)

== Compared with Pe̍h-ōe-jī and Foochow Romanized ==
IPA	Hinghwa Romanized	Foochow Romanized
pʰ	p	p
tʰ	t	t
kʰ	k	k
p	b	b
t	d	d
k	g	g
tsʰ	ch	ch
ts	c	c

Tone	陰平 Ing-báⁿ	陰上 Ing-siō̤ng	陰去 Ing-kṳ̍	陰入 Ing-ci̍h	陽平 Ió̤ng-báⁿ	陽去 Ió̤ng-kṳ̍	陽入 Ió̤ng-ci̍h
Hinghwa Romanized	a	â	a̍	ah	á	ā	a̍h
Pe̍h-ōe-jī	a	á	à	ah	â	ā	a̍h
