= Grave and acute =

Perceptual classification in phonetics

In some schools of phonetics, sounds are distinguished as grave or acute. This is a perceptual classification, based on whether the sounds are perceived as having a secondary, lesser intensity emphasis (grave), or a primary, higher intensity emphasis (acute). The accents can also be classified acoustically, with acute sounds occupying a higher frequency on the audio spectrum than grave, or in terms of their differing articulations.

Acute sounds generally have high perceptual intensity, and in the case of consonants have been defined as those with an active articulation involving the tongue and a passive articulation involving anywhere on the roof of the mouth that a coronal articulation can reach, that is, from the dental to the palatal region.

Grave sounds are all other sounds, that is, those involving the lips as either passive or active articulator, or those involving any articulation in the soft palate or throat.

Most acute sounds are coronal, and most coronals are acute. In particular, palatal consonants are acute but not coronal, while linguolabial consonants are coronal but not acute. The distinction can be useful in diachronic linguistics, as conditional sound changes often act differently on acute and grave consonants, consonants are highly likely to preserve their acuteness/graveness through sound change; and changes between acute and grave can often be well circumscribed. (For example, palatalization applied to back grave consonants usually produces acute consonants.) In this regard, the fact that palatal articulations are included as "acute" is important because of the acoustic similarity between true palatal and palatalized coronal consonants and the fact that one often changes into the other.

Similarly, "acute" and "front" often overlap, but again share some differences. In particular, consonants articulated with the lip are front but not acute, and consonants with a palatal articulation are acute but not front. A parallel relationship applies to coronal and front. Articulations with the lip as passive articulator (i.e. labial and labiodental) are front but not coronal, while subapical palatal is coronal but not front.

In the case of vowels, "acute" typically refers to front vowels, which often trigger palatalization of consonants, which "grave" refers to non-front vowels.

== Modern relevance ==
The grave/acute distinction has lost its relevance in modern phonetics, but it may still be relevant to other disciplines. The distinction dates from relatively early in the days of acoustic phonetics, at a time that some phonologists believed that one could categorize all speech sounds by a finite set of acoustically defined distinctive features, which were supposed to correspond to auditory impressions of sounds. The pioneering publication was Jakobson, Fant and Halle (1951) Preliminaries to Speech Analysis (MIT). Grave/acute was defined primarily in acoustic terms (with some reference to auditory qualities), but sounds were given a secondary description (or gloss) in terms of their articulation. Features like grave/acute could be used to divide speech sounds into broad classes. For most phoneticians, the JF&H features had been superseded by 1968 by the articulatory features set out in Chomsky and Halle’s Sound Pattern of English and by competing articulatory features devised by Ladefoged in such publications as Preliminaries to Linguistic Phonetics (1971).
