= Ningde dialect =

Eastern Min Chinese dialect

Ningde
- 寧德話
- Native to: Ningde, Fujian
- Language family: Sino-Tibetan: Sinitic; Chinese; Min; Coastal Min; Eastern Min; Funing; Ningde
- Early forms: Proto-Sino-Tibetan: Old Chinese (Note: Min is believed to have split from Old Chinese, rather than Middle Chinese like other varieties of Chinese.); Proto-Min

Language codes
- ISO 639-3: –
- Glottolog: None
- Linguasphere: 79-AAA-icb

The Ningde dialect (Eastern Min: 寧德話) is a dialect of Eastern Min Chinese spoken in urban areas of Ningde, China, which is a prefecture-level city in the northeastern coast of Fujian province.

== Phonology ==
The Ningde dialect has 15 initials, 78 rimes and 7 tones.

=== Initials ===
p, pʰ, m, t, tʰ, n, l, ts, tsʰ, s, k, kʰ, ŋ, x, ʔ

=== Rimes ===
10 monophthongs: a, ɛ, œ, ø, ɔ, o, i, u, y

18 compound vowels: ai, ei, ɔi, oi, øy, au, ɛu, eu, ou, ia, ie, iu, iɐu, ua, uo, ui, uai, uoi

15 nasal rimes: aŋ, ɛŋ, eŋ, œŋ, øŋ, ɔŋ, oŋ, iŋ, uŋ, yŋ, iaŋ, iɛŋ, uaŋ, uoŋ, yøŋ

26 checked rimes: aʔ, ɛʔ, œʔ, øʔ, ɔʔ, iʔ, iaʔ, iɛʔ, uaʔ, uoʔ, yøʔ, ak̚, ɛk̚, ek̚, œk̚, øk̚, ɔk̚, ok̚, ik̚, uk̚, yk̚, iak̚, iɛk̚, uak̚, uok̚, yøk̚

These 6 nasal rimes tend to merge into nasal rimes ending with coda -ŋ, and will disappear in future: am, ɛm, em, im, iɛm, ɔn

These 5 checked rimes tend to merge into nasal rimes ending with coda -k̚, and will disappear in future: ap̚, ɛp̚, ep̚, ip̚, iɛp̚

=== Tones ===
No.	1	2	3	4	5	6	7
Tone name	dark level 陰平	light level 陽平	rising 上聲	dark departing 陰去	light departing 陽去	dark entering 陰入	light entering 陽入
Tone contour	˦ (44)	˨ (22)	˦˨ (42)	˧˥ (35)	˧˧˨ (332)	˨ (2)	˥ (5)

=== Initial assimilation ===
The two-syllable initial assimilation rules are shown in the table below:

Coda of the Former Syllable	Initial Assimilation
Null coda	The initial of the latter syllable may change: /p/, /pʰ/ change to null initial or /β/; /t/, /tʰ/ and /s/ change to /l/; /ts/ and /tsʰ/ change to null initial or /ʒ/; /k/, /kʰ/ and /x/ change to null initial; /m/, /n/, /l/, /ŋ/ and null initial remain unchanged.
Nasal coda	The initial of the latter syllable may change: /p/ and /pʰ/ change to /m/; /t/, /tʰ/ and /s/ change to /n/; /ts/ and /tsʰ/ change to /ʒ/ or /m/; /k/, /kʰ/, /x/ and null initial change to /ŋ/ or /m/; /m/, /n/, /l/ and /ŋ/ remain unchanged.
checked coda	The former syllable lost its checked coda at first; then, the initial assimilation of latter syllable follow the law above.
checked coda /-p̚/	The Initial of latter syllable change to /p/ while the former syllable lost its checked coda /-p̚/

=== Tone sandhi ===
The Ningde dialect has extremely extensive tone sandhi rules: in an utterance, only the last syllable pronounced is not affected by the rules. The two-syllable tonal sandhi rules are shown in the table below (the columns give the first syllable's original citation tone, while the rows give the citation tone of the second syllable):

	dark level 44	light level 22	rising 42	dark departing 35	light departing 332	dark entering 2	light entering 5
dark level 44	44		21	44	21	44	21
light level 22	remain unchanged						
rising 42	55						
dark departing 35	55						
light departing 332	44		21	44	21	44	21
dark entering 2	55						
light entering 5	44		21	44	21	44	21
