= Wuhan dialect =

Dialect of Chinese language

- 武汉话
- Pronunciation: pinyin: Wùhánhuá [u⁴²xan¹³xua³⁵]
- Native to: China
- Region: Wuhan, Hubei
- Language family: Sino-Tibetan: Chinese; Mandarin; Southwestern; Wu-Tian; Wuhan dialect

Language codes
- ISO 639-3: –
- ISO 639-6: xghu
- Linguist List: cmn-xwu
- Glottolog: None

The Wuhan dialect (simplified Chinese: 武汉话; traditional Chinese: 武漢話, locally [u⁴²xan¹³xua³⁵] Wùhánhuá); pinyin: Wǔhànhuà), also known as the Hankou dialect after the former town of Hankou, belongs to the Wu–Tian branch of Southwest Mandarin spoken in Wuhan, Tianmen and surrounding areas in Hubei, China. The Wuhan dialect has limited mutual intelligibility with Standard Chinese. Grammatically, it has been observed to have a similar aspect system to Xiang Chinese.

== Phonology ==
=== Tones ===
Like other Southwest Mandarin varieties, there are four tones. Words with the checked tone in Middle Chinese became the light level tone.

- Dark level 55 (also 44)
- Light level 312
- Rising 42
- Falling 35
- Neutral

Middle Chinese tone class	Wuhan tone class	Tone diacritic	Example
陰平 Dark level	High	āōēīūǖ	拉 (la^{55})
陽平 Light level and 入 Entering	Dipping	ǎǒěǐǔǚ	爸 (pa^{213})
上 Rising (X)	Falling	àòèìùǜ	走 (zou^{42})
去 Departing (H)	Rising	áóéíúǘ	叫 (tɕiau^{35})
	Neutral

== Media use ==
Wuhan dialect is used in the 2019 film The Wild Goose Lake.

It is also used in the 2021 film Embrace Again, which is set in Wuhan. Embrace Again was filmed and released in two versions, one in Wuhan dialect and one in Standard Mandarin.
