= Elizabeth F. Fisher =

American geologist (1873–1941)

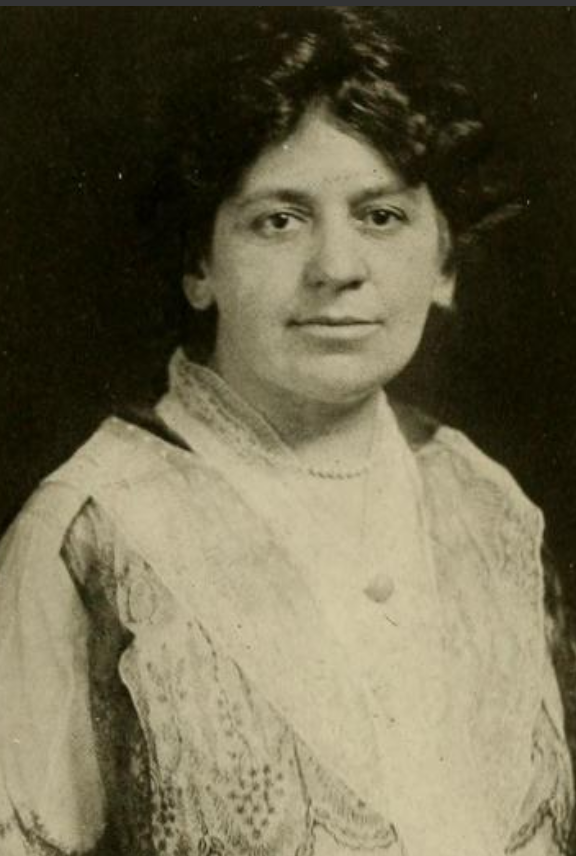
- Elizabeth Florette Fisher, from a 1915 publication
- Born: November 26, 1873; Boston, Massachusetts, US
- Died: April 25, 1941; Los Angeles, California, US
- Occupations: Geologist, college professor
- Title: Professor of Geology and Geography

Elizabeth Florette Fisher (November 26, 1873 – April 25, 1941) was one of the first field geologists in the United States. Born in Boston, Massachusetts, she attended and later taught at the Massachusetts Institute of Technology (MIT). She was also the first woman to be sent out by an oil company for a survey, helping to locate oil wells in North-Central Texas during a nationwide oil shortage. During this same time, she not only continued her career as an instructor at Wellesley College, but also wrote an influential textbook for junior high students called Resources and Industries of the United States. She stressed the need for conservation, and believed "unclaimed" land should be used for agriculture. She was a fellow of the American Association for the Advancement of Science and the American Geographical Society, and also was a member of the Appalachian Mountain Club and the Boston Society of Natural History. She died in 1941 from illness.

There is a scholarship at Wellesley College in her name for women graduates who are planning on further study.

== Early life and education ==
Fisher was born on November 26, 1873, in Boston, Massachusetts, to Charles and Sarah Gerrish (Cushing) Fisher.

She graduated from the Boston Girls' High School in 1891, and enrolled at the Massachusetts Institute of Technology (MIT). She began teaching at Wellesley College while she was still a student, and accepted a permanent position after graduating from MIT in 1896 with a thesis on "Geographical History of Lake Cochituate".

== Career ==
Fisher studied oil wells in Baku in 1897 on a voyage to Russia with the International Geological Congress.

She advanced to associate professor of Geology and Mineralogy in 1906, and to Professor of Geology and Mineralogy in 1908. She was Chairman of Wellesley's Department of Geology between 1908 and 1926.

Fisher became a professor emeritus in 1926 and retired.

== Bibliography ==
- Elizabeth Florette Fisher (1906). Terraces of the West River, Brattleboro, Vermont, Boston Society of Natural History, Pr. 33, 9–42
- Elizabeth Florette Fisher (1919). Resources and Industries of the United States
