= Pu–Xian Min =

Min Chinese language

- 莆仙語/莆仙話/興化話; Pó-sing-gṳ̂/Pó-sing-uā/Hing-hua̍-uā
- Native to: China, Malaysia, Singapore, Indonesia, Taiwan (Wuqiu)
- Region: Fujian (Putian, parts of Fuzhou and Quanzhou)
- Ethnicity: Putianese (Han Chinese)
- Native speakers: 3.15 million (2022)
- Language family: Sino-Tibetan: Sinitic; Chinese; Min; Coastal Min; Pu–Xian Min
- Early forms: Proto-Sino-Tibetan: Old Chinese (Note: Min is believed to have split from Old Chinese, rather than Middle Chinese like other varieties of Chinese.); Proto-Min
- Dialects: Putian; Xianyou
- Writing system: Simplified Han characters Traditional Han characters Hinghwa Romanized (Hing-hua̍ Báⁿ-uā-ci̍)

Language codes
- ISO 639-3: cpx
- Glottolog: puxi1243
- Linguasphere: 79-AAA-id
- Pu-Xian Min

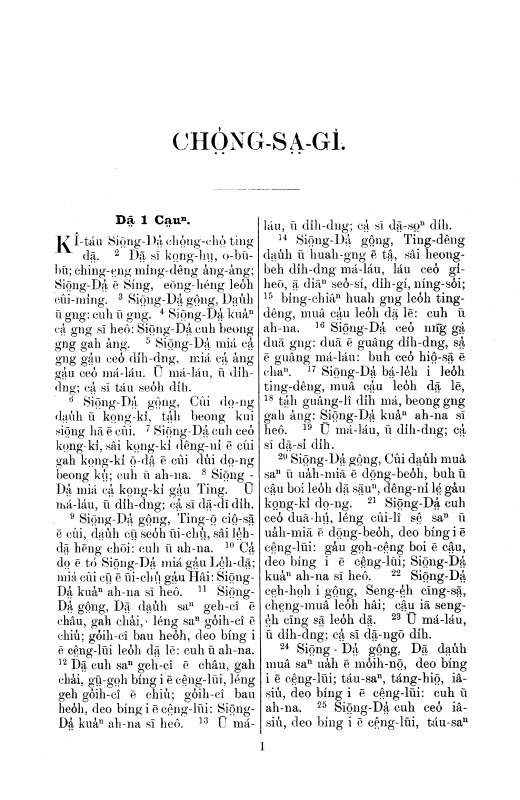
Bible in Hinghwa (Xinghua) Romanised (Genesis), published by the British and Foreign Bible Society.

Pu–Xian Min (Hinghwa Romanized: Pó-sing-gṳ̂; traditional Chinese: 莆仙話; simplified Chinese: 莆仙话; pinyin: Púxiānhuà), also known as Putian–Xianyou Min, Puxian Min, Pu–Xian Chinese, Xinghua, Henghua, Hinghua or Hinghwa (Hing-hua̍-gṳ̂; traditional Chinese: 興化語; simplified Chinese: 兴化语; pinyin: Xīnghuàyǔ), is a Chinese language that forms a branch of Min Chinese. Pu-Xian is a transitional variety of Coastal Min which shares characteristics with both Eastern Min and Southern Min, although it is closer to the latter.

The native language of Putian people, Pu-Xian is spoken mostly in Fujian province, particularly in Putian city and Xianyou County (after which it is named), parts of Fuzhou, and parts of Quanzhou. It is also widely used as the mother tongue in Wuqiu Township, Kinmen County, Fujian Province, Republic of China (Taiwan). More than 2,000 people in Shacheng, Fuding in northern Fujian also speak Pu-Xian. There are minor differences between the dialects of Putian and Xianyou.

Overseas populations of Pu-Xian speakers exist in Malaysia, Indonesia and Singapore. Speakers of Pu-Xian are also known as Henghua, Hinghua, or Xinghua.

== History ==
Before the year 979 AD, the Pu-Xian region was part of Quanzhou county and hence people there spoke a form of Southern Min.

In 979 AD, during the Song dynasty, the region was administratively separated from Quanzhou and the Chinese spoken there developed separately from the rest of Southern Min. Due to its proximity with Fuzhou, it absorbed some elements of Eastern Min, such as morphophonemic alternations in initial consonants, but its basic linguistic characteristics, i.e. grammar and most of its lexicon, are based on Southern Min. It also shares denasalization of historical nasal consonants and vocalic nasalization with Southern Min varieties.

Pu–Xian Min has been shown to be 62% cognate with Quanzhou dialect (Southern Min) and only 39% cognate with the Fuzhou dialect (Eastern Min).

== Characteristics ==
=== Differences with Southern Min dialects ===
Pu-Xian differs from most Southern Min varieties in several ways:

- The vowel 'a' is replaced by /ɒ/ (o̤) in most cases, e.g. 腳 ko̤ "leg".
- The vowel 'ư' /ɯ/ is replaced by /y/ ('ṳ'), e.g. 魚 hṳ "fish".
- In Putian 'ng' has changed to /uŋ/ except after zero initial and h- (notation: ng), e.g. 湯 tung "soup".
- The vowel /e/ is often replaced by /ɒ/ o̤, e.g. 馬 bo̤ "horse".
- Where Quanzhou has 'ĩ' and Zhangzhou has 'ẽ', the corresponding Putian vowel is 'ã', e.g. 病 baⁿ "sick", where ⁿ indicates a nasalized vowel.
- The vowel 'io' is replaced by 'iau' (notation: a̤u), e.g. 笑 ciao "laugh". This also holds for nasalized vowels, e.g. 張 da̤uⁿ corresponding to Zhangzhou tioⁿ.
- Nasals 'm' sometimes occur in place of voiced stops 'b', e.g. 夢 mang vs. Quanzhou bang.
- Initial consonant 'ng' replaces 'g' e.g. 五 'ngo' vs. Quanzhou 'go'.
- There is a loss of distinction between voiced and unvoiced stops, e.g. the sounds /b/ and /p/ both correspond to the same phoneme and occur in free variation.

=== Borrowings from Eastern Min ===
- Wife 老媽 (Lau Ma)

== Phonology ==
Pu-Xian has 15 consonants, including the zero onset, the same as most other Min varieties. Pu-Xian is distinctive for having a lateral fricative [ɬ] instead of the [s] in other Min varieties, similar to Taishanese.

Pu-Xian has 53 finals and 6 phonemic tones.

=== Initials ===
Pu–Xian Min Initial Chart
		Bilabial	Alveolar	Velar	Glottal
Plosive	unaspirated	p 巴 (b)	t 打 (d)	k 家 (g)	ʔ 烏
Plosive	aspirated	pʰ 彭 (p)	tʰ 他 (t)	kʰ 卡 (k)	
Nasals		m 麻 (m)	n 拿 (n)	ŋ 雅 (ng)	
Fricatives		β*	ɬ 沙 (s)		h 下 (h)
Affricates	unaspirated		ts 渣 (c)		
Affricates	aspirated		tsʰ 査 (ch)		
Approximant			l 拉 (l)		

- β only appears in connected speech, as a result of consonant mutation of [p].

=== Finals ===
Pu–Xian Min has 53 finals (including nasalised finals)

Finals
	Vowel	Diphthong	Nasal	Glottal
no glide	a 鴉 (a)	au 拗 (au)	aŋ 王 (ang)	aʔ 壓 (ah)
no glide	ɒ 奥 (o̤)		ɒŋ 用 (o̤ng)	ɒʔ 屋 (o̤h)
no glide	ɔ 科 (eo)	ɔu 烏 (o)	ɔŋ 温 (eong)	oʔ 熨 (eoh)
no glide	e 裔 (a̤)	ai 愛 (ai)	ɛŋ 煙 (eng)	ɛʔ 黑 (eh)
no glide	œ 改 (e̤)		œŋ 換 (e̤ng)	œʔ 郁 (e̤h)
no glide			ŋ 伓 (ng)	
/-i-/	i 衣 (i)	iu 油 (iu)	iŋ 引 (ing)	iʔ 益 (ih)
/-i-/	ia 夜 (ia)	iau 要 (a̤u)	iaŋ 鹽 (iang)	iaʔ 葉 (iah)
/-u-/	u 夫 (u)	ui 位 (ui)	uŋ 黄 (ng)	
/-u-/	ua 画 (ua)	ɔi/ue 歪 (oi)	uaŋ 碗 (uang)	uaʔ 活 (uah)
/-y-/	y 余 (ṳ)		yŋ 恩 (ṳng)	yʔ 役 (ṳh)
/-y-/	yɒ 安 (io̤ⁿ)		yɒŋ 羊 (io̤ng)	yɒʔ 藥 (io̤h)

Chinese character	黃 (ńg)	方 (hng)	漲 (dn̂g)	幫 (bng)	光 (gng)	兩 (nn̄g)	毛 (mńg)
Putian	uŋ	huŋ	tuŋ	puŋ	kuŋ	nuŋ	muŋ
Xianyou	ŋ̍	hŋ̍	tŋ̍	pŋ̍	kŋ̍	nŋ̍	mŋ̍

Xianyou dialect nasals
IPA	ã	ẽ	ɛ̃	ĩ	ỹ	ɒ̃	iã	yã	uã	aĩ	aũ	uĩ	iũ
Romanization	aⁿ	a̤ⁿ		a̤ⁿ	e̤ⁿ	o̤ⁿ	iaⁿ	io̤ⁿ	uaⁿ			oiⁿ	a̤uⁿ
Romanized IPA	ã			ẽ	ø̃	ɒ̃	iã	yɒ̃	uã			oĩ	ɛũ

Chinese character	爭 (caⁿ)	還 (há̤ⁿ)	段 (dē̤ⁿ)	三 (so̤ⁿ)	鼎 (diáⁿ)	張 (da̤uⁿ)	看 (kua̍ⁿ)	飯 (bōiⁿ)	贏 (ió̤ⁿ)
Xianyou	tsã	hĩ	tỹ	sɒ̃	tiã	tiũ	kʰuã	puĩ	yɒ̃
Putian	tsa	hi	tø	sɒ	tia	tiau	kʰua	puai	yɒ

=== Tone ===
Tone	Ing-báⁿ 陰平	Ing-siō̤ng 陰上	Ing-kṳ̍ 陰去	Ing-ci̍h 陰入	Ió̤ng-báⁿ 陽平	Ió̤ng-kṳ̍ 陽去	Ió̤ng-ci̍h 陽入
Putian	˥˧˧ (533)	˦˥˧ (453)	˦˨ (42)	ʔ˨˩ (ʔ21)	˩˧ (13)	˩ (11)	ʔ˦ (ʔ4)
Xianyou	˥˦˦ (544)	˧˧˨ (332)	˥˨ (52)	ʔ˨ (ʔ2)	˨˦ (24)	˨˩ (21)	ʔ˦ (ʔ4)

=== Register ===
Xianyou dialect register chart
Chinese character	買	黃	生	領	師	兩	火	壁	著
Colloquial	pe	ŋ̍	ɬã, tsʰã	nia	ɬai	nŋ̍	hoe	pia	tieu
Literary	mai	hɒŋ	ɬɛŋ	liŋ	ɬo	løŋ	hɒ	piʔ	tøʔ

=== Assimilation ===
新婦房 ɬiŋ pu paŋ → ɬiŋ mu βaŋ

青草 tsʰɔŋ tsʰau → tsʰɔŋ nau

=== Comparison between Putian Min and Quanzhou Min Nan ===
Chinese character	埋 (lit.)	萬 (lit.)	人 (lit.)	入	危 (lit.)	逆	內	諾
Putian	mai	man	tsin	tsiʔ	kui	kiʔ	tue	tɔʔ
Quanzhou	bai	ban	lin	dzip	ɡui	ɡiak	lue	lɔk

== Sentence-final particles ==
- ah (啊): used to express exclamation.
- lah (啦): used to stress or for adding emotional effect to words.
- neh (呢): used for questioning.
- nɔ (唔): used to express emotion.
- yɔu (哟): used to denote obviousness or contention.

== Romanization ==
Hing-hua̍ báⁿ-uā-ci̍ (興化平話字) is the Romanization system for Pu–Xian Min. It has 23 letters: a a̤ b c ch d e e̤ g h i k l m n ng o o̤ p s t u ṳ.

The Romanization only needs five tone marks for seven tones:

- 陰平 Ing-báⁿ (unmarked)
- 陰上 Ing-siō̤ng ˆ (â)
- 陰去 Ing-kṳ̍ ˈ (a̍)
- 陰入 Ing-ci̍h (unmarked)
- 陽平 Ió̤ng-báⁿ ́ (á)
- 陽去 Ió̤ng-kṳ̍ – (ā)
- 陽入 Ió̤ng-ci̍h ˈh (a̍h)

IPA	Pu–Xian Min (Xinghua)	Fuzhou
pʰ	p	p
tʰ	t	t
kʰ	k	k
p	b	b
t	d	d
k	g	g
tsʰ	ch	ch
ts	c	c

Tone	陰平 Ing-báⁿ	陰上 Ing-siō̤ng	陰去 Ing-kṳ̍	陰入 Ing-ci̍h	陽平 Ió̤ng-báⁿ	陽去 Ió̤ng-kṳ̍	陽入 Ió̤ng-ci̍h
Báⁿ-uā-ci̍	a	â	a̍	ah	á	ā	a̍h
Pe̍h-ōe-jī	a	á	à	ah	â	ā	a̍h
