= List of Hokkien dictionaries =

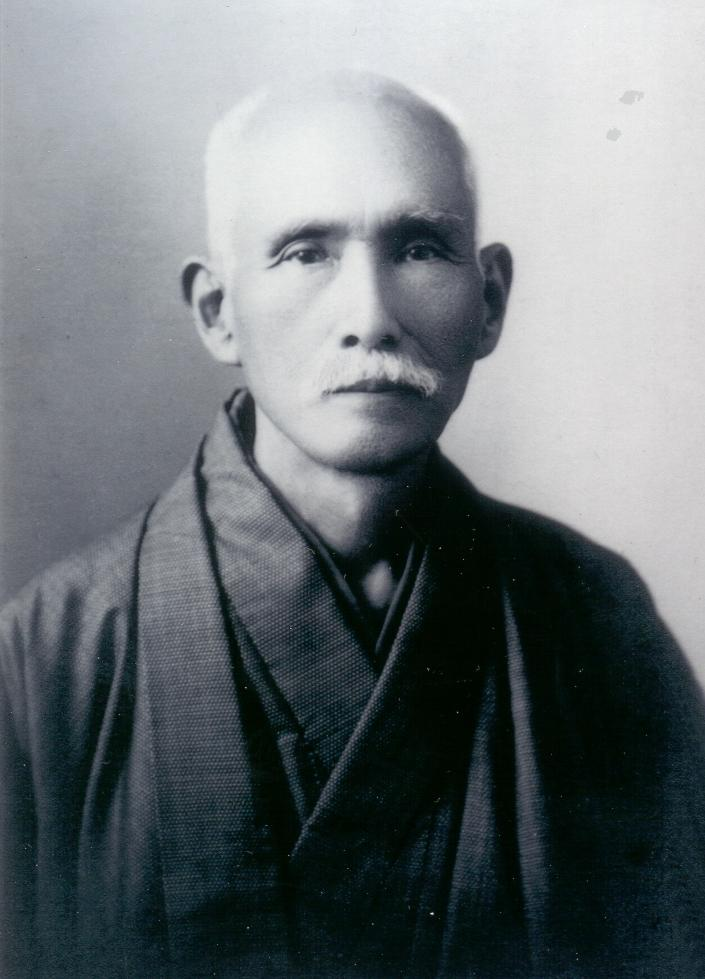
Siáu-chhoan Siōng-gī (Naoyoshi Ogawa; 小川尚義), main author and editor of the Comprehensive Taiwanese–Japanese Dictionary (1931)

Below is a list of Hokkien dictionaries, also known as Minnan dictionaries or Taiwanese dictionaries, sorted by the date of the release of their first edition. The first two were prepared by Western Christian missionaries and the third by the Empire of Japan, but the rest were prepared by ethnic Hoklo scholars.

- A Dictionary of the Hok-këèn Dialect of the Chinese Language (1832) – Walter Henry Medhurst
- Chinese–English Dictionary of the Vernacular or Spoken Language of Amoy, with the Principal Variations of the Chang-chew and Chin-chew Dialects (1873) – Carstairs Douglas and Thomas Barclay
- Comprehensive Taiwanese–Japanese Dictionary (Note: This is a literal translation; sometimes "comprehensive" (大) is not rendered as part of the English title, or it is translated even more literally as "big".) (1931) (Note: The first edition of volume one (上卷) was released in 1931, but volume two (下卷) was not released until 1932.) – Siáu-chhoan Siōng-gī (Naoyoshi Ogawa; 小川尚義) (Note: Later editions, after the fall of Imperial Japan, had substantial contributions by Âng Ûi-jîn.) for the Office of the Governor-General of Taiwan
- Practical English–Hokkien Dictionary (1950) – Chiang Ker Chiu (蒋克秋)
- A comprehensive dictionary of Taiwanese, with sections on the Zhangzhou and Quanzhou varieties of Southern Min (1991) – Chén Xiū (陳修) and Chén Wénjīng (陳文晶)
- Xiamen Fangyan Cidian (1993) – Zhou Changji (周长楫)
- Dictionary of Taiwanese Vocabulary (1995) – Yáng Qīngchù (楊青矗)
- Minnan Fangyan Da Cidian (2006) – Zhou Changji (周长楫) et al.
- Dictionary of Frequently-Used Taiwan Minnan (online; β ed. 2008; 1st ed. 2011) – Ministry of Education (Taiwan)
- Longyan Fangyan Cidian 龙岩方言词典 (2016) – Guo Qixi (郭启熹) et al.
