= 永春 =

永春 may refer to:

- Eishun, name of a number of Japanese painters
- Yeongchun-myeon (영춘면), myeon in Danyang-gun, Chungcheongbuk-do, South Korea
- Yongchun (disambiguation), a number of Chinese place names

== See also ==
- The dictionary definition of 永 at Wiktionary
- The dictionary definition of 春 at Wiktionary
