= Yongchun dialect =

Dialect of Hokkien

Yongchun
- 永春话 / 永春話
- Native to: People's Republic of China; Republic of China; Malaysia; Singapore; Indonesia; Philippines; Brunei; Myanmar
- Region: Yongchun County, Quanzhou, Southern Fujian province.
- Language family: Sino-Tibetan: Sinitic; Chinese; Min; Coastal Min; Southern Min; Hokkien; Quanzhou; Yongchun
- Early forms: Proto-Sino-Tibetan: Old Chinese (Note: Min is believed to have split from Old Chinese, rather than Middle Chinese like other varieties of Chinese.); Proto-Min

Language codes
- ISO 639-3: –
- Glottolog: None

The Yongchun dialect (simplified Chinese: 永春话; traditional Chinese: 永春話; Tâi-lô: Íng-tshun-uē) is a dialect of the Hokkien language mostly spoken in Yongchun County of Quanzhou city in Southern Fujian Province, China. It belongs to the Quanzhou Hokkien branch.

Because most of the early immigrants to southern Malaysia were Quanzhou people, minority Quanzhou Yongchun people in Klang spoke the Yongchun dialect, and the other are assimilation by Tung'an Dialect.

== Phonology ==
The table below contains all the finals of the Yongchun dialect.

i 支,資	a 飽,爸	e 袋,下	u 有,龜	o 無,道	ɔ 故,古	ɯ 豬,去	ə 火,灰
ia 寫,奇	iu 丑,休	io 少,笑	iou 張	iau 了,刁	ieʔ 滅,别	au 流,交	ou 河
im 心,金	am 含,街	əm 欣,森	iam 減,欠	m 毋,梅	in 新, 品	an 安,干	un 分,雲
ian (iɛn) 電,現	uan 權	iŋ 朋,丁	aŋ 紅,東	ɔŋ 講,仿	iaŋ 響,誰	iɔŋ 忠,央	uaŋ 風
it 筆,必	at 插	ãt 炸,閘	uat 法,髮	uet 八,拔	iat (iɛt) 揭,切	ət 說	
ak 迫,白	ɔk 各,駁	iak 頁,白	iɔk 著,咯	uak 潑,脱	uik 突,率	ŋ 光,床	
ip 立,吸	ap 答,朵	iap 粒,澀	ui 桂,貴	ua 大,刮	ue 多,花	uai 怪,歪	
ĩ 圓,平	ã 三,罵	ẽ 妹,奶	ãi 耐,唉	iã 走,驚	uĩ 关,千	uã 官,汗	uãi 彎
iʔ	aʔ	eʔ	uʔ	əʔ	ɯʔ	iaʔ	ioʔ
ãuʔ	ɔʔ	ŋ̍ʔ	iɔʔ	ueʔ	iãuʔ		
