= Yongchun =

Yongchun may refer to:

- Yongchun County, county of Quanzhou City, Fujian Province, China
- Yongchun dialect, a dialect of Hokkien spoken in the county
- Wing Chun, or Yongchun in pinyin, Chinese martial art that specializes in close-range combat
- Yongchun Station, station on the Nangang Line of the Taipei Rapid Transit System, Taiwan
