= Kelantan Peranakan Hokkien =

Mixed Hokkien–Southern Thai–Kelantan Malay language

- Hokkien Kelantan, Kelantan Local Hokkien
- Native to: Malaysia
- Region: Kelantan
- Native speakers: 20,000 (2021)
- Language family: mixed Hokkien–Southern Thai–Kelantan Malay

Language codes
- ISO 639-3: None (mis)
- Glottolog: None

Kelantan Peranakan Hokkien or Hokkien Kelantan is a mixed language spoken by about 20,000 people in Kelantan, in northern Malaysia. It derives from Hokkien Chinese, Southern Thai and Kelantan Malay, with increasing influence from standard Malay. It is not mutually intelligible with mainstream Hokkien, and speakers do not identify as ethnically Hokkien, but as Cino Kapong (Cina Kampung in standard Malay) or "Country Chinese".
