= Zhangzhou dialects =

Collection of Hokkien dialects

Zhangzhou
- 漳州話 / 漳州话 (Chiang-chiu-ōa)
- Pronunciation: [tsiaŋ˨ tsiu˨ ua˨]
- Native to: China, Taiwan, Malaysia, Indonesia, Singapore, Myanmar, Thailand, Philippines.
- Region: city of Zhangzhou, southern Fujian province
- Language family: Sino-Tibetan: Sinitic; Chinese; Min; Coastal Min; Southern Min; Hokkien; Zhangzhou
- Early forms: Proto-Sino-Tibetan: Old Chinese (Note: Min is believed to have split from Old Chinese, rather than Middle Chinese like other varieties of Chinese.); Proto-Min

Language codes
- ISO 639-3: –
- Glottolog: fuji1236
- Linguasphere: 79-AAA-jed
- Zhangzhou dialect

The Zhangzhou dialects (simplified Chinese: 漳州话; traditional Chinese: 漳州話; Pe̍h-ōe-jī: Chiang-chiu-ōa), also rendered Changchew, Chiangchew or Changchow, are a collection of Hokkien dialects spoken in southern Fujian province (in southeast China), centered on the city of Zhangzhou. The Zhangzhou dialect proper is the source of some place names in English, including Amoy (from [ɛ˨˩ mui˩˧], now called Xiamen), and Quemoy (from [kim˨ mui˩˧], now called Kinmen).

== Classification ==
The Zhangzhou dialects are classified as Hokkien, a group of Southern Min varieties. In Fujian, the Zhangzhou dialects form the southern subgroup (南片) of Southern Min. The dialect of urban Zhangzhou is one of the oldest dialects of Southern Min, and along with the urban Quanzhou dialect, it forms the basis for all modern varieties. When compared with other varieties of Hokkien, it has an intelligibility of 89.0% with the Amoy dialect and 79.7% with the urban Quanzhou dialect.

== Phonology ==
This section is mostly based on the variety spoken in the urban area of Zhangzhou.

=== Initials ===
There are 15 phonemic initials:

		Bilabial	Alveolar		Velar	Glottal
		Bilabial	plain	sibilant (Note: The place of articulation of the alveolar phonemes /ts/, /tsʰ/, /s/ and /dz/ is slightly further back, as if between that of [ts] and [tɕ]; palatalization of these phonemes is especially obvious before rimes that begin with /i/, e.g. 入 [d͡ʑip̚].)	Velar	Glottal
Plosive/ Affricate	plain	/p/ ⟨p⟩ 邊 / 边	/t/ ⟨t⟩ 地	/ts/ ⟨ch⟩ 曾	/k/ ⟨k⟩ 求	/ʔ/ ⟨-⟩ 英
Plosive/ Affricate	aspirated	/pʰ/ ⟨ph⟩ 頗 / 颇	/tʰ/ ⟨th⟩ 他	/tsʰ/ ⟨chh⟩ 出	/kʰ/ ⟨kh⟩ 氣 / 气	
Plosive/ Affricate	voiced	/b/ ⟨b⟩ 門 / 门		/dz/ ⟨j⟩ 熱 / 热	/g/ ⟨g⟩ 語 / 语	
Fricative				/s/ ⟨s⟩ 時 / 时		/h/ ⟨h⟩ 喜
Lateral			/l/ ⟨l⟩ 柳			

When the rime is nasalized, the three voiced phonemes /b/, /l/ and /g/ are realized as the nasals [m], [n] and [ŋ], respectively.

=== Rimes ===
There are 85 rimes:

		Open syllable							Nasal coda							Nasal vowel coda				
open mouth		/a/ 阿	/ɔ/ 烏 / 乌	/o/ 好	/e/ 鞋	/ɛ/ 家	/ai/ 愛 / 爱	/au/ 歐 / 欧	/m̩/ 毋	/am/ 庵	/ɔm/ 森	/an/ 按	/ŋ̍/ 霜	/aŋ/ 港	/ɔŋ/ 王	/ã/ 餡 / 馅	/ɔ̃/ 毛	/ɛ̃/ 暝	/ãi/ 妹	/ãu/ 矛
open mouth	checked	/aʔ/ 鴨 / 鸭	/ɔʔ/ 嘔 / 呕	/oʔ/ 學 / 学	/eʔ/ 八	/ɛʔ/ 百		/auʔ/ 落	/m̩ʔ/ 默	/ap/ 合	/ɔp/ 啑	/at/ 達 / 达	/ŋ̍ʔ/ 嗆 / 呛	/ak/ 六	/ɔk/ 國 / 国	/ãʔ/ 焓	/ɔ̃ʔ/ 膜	/ɛ̃ʔ/ 脈 / 脉		/ãuʔ/ 澩 / 泶
even teeth		/i/ 魚 / 鱼	/ia/ 椰	/io/ 叫		/iu/ 油	/iau/ 鳥 / 鸟		/im/ 心	/iam/ 薟 / 莶	/in/ 今	/ian/ 燕	/iŋ/ 星	/iaŋ/ 央	/iɔŋ/ 衝 / 冲	/ĩ/ 圓 / 圆	/iã/ 影	/iɔ̃/ 娘	/iũ/ 妞	/iãu/ 貓 / 猫
even teeth	checked	/iʔ/ 滴	/iaʔ/ 頁 / 页	/iɔʔ/ 諾 / 诺	/ioʔ/ 藥 / 药	/iuʔ/ 喌	/iauʔ/ 寂		/ip/ 入	/iap/ 葉 / 叶	/it/ 必	/iat/ 滅 / 灭	/ik/ 色	/iak/ 約 / 约	/iɔk/ 祝	/ĩʔ/ 物	/iãʔ/ 嚇 / 吓			/iãuʔ/ 蟯 / 蛲
closed mouth		/u/ 有	/ua/ 花	/ue/ 火	/ui/ 水	/uai/ 歪			/un/ 溫 / 温	/uan/ 完						/uã/ 山	/uĩ/ 黃 / 黄	/uãi/ 檨 / 檨		
closed mouth	checked	/uʔ/ 托	/uaʔ/ 辣	/ueʔ/ 郭					/ut/ 骨	/uat/ 越								/uãiʔ/ 跩		

The vowel /a/ is the open central unrounded vowel [ä] in most rimes, including /a/, /ua/, /ia/, /ai/, /uai/, /au/, /iau/, /ã/, /ãʔ/. In the rimes /ian/ and /iat/, /a/ is realized as [ɛ] (i.e. as [iɛn] and [iɛt̚]) or [ə] (i.e. as [iən] and [iət̚]).

The rimes /iŋ/ and /ik/ are usually realized with a short [ə] between the vowel [i] and the velar consonant. In many areas outside of the urban area of Zhangzhou, including Pinghe, Changtai, Yunxiao, Zhao'an and Dongshan, /iŋ/ and /ik/ are pronounced as /eŋ/ and /ek/ instead.

The codas /p/, /t/ and /k/ are unreleased, i.e. [p̚], [t̚] and [k̚], respectively.

=== Tones ===
There are seven tones:

No.	1	2	3	4	5	6	7
Tone name	dark level 陰平 / 阴平	light level 陽平 / 阳平	rising 上聲 / 上声	dark departing 陰去 / 阴去	light departing 陽去 / 阳去	dark entering 陰入 / 阴入	light entering 陽入 / 阳入
Tone contour	˦ (44)	˩˧ (13)	˥˧ (53)	˨˩ (21)	˨ (22)	˧˨ (32)	˩˨˩ (121)
Example hanzi	東 / 东	同	董	棟 / 栋	動 / 动	督	獨 / 独

Most people in the urban area do not pronounce the dark level tone as high-level, but slightly mid-rising. While most sources still records this tone as 44, its tone value has also been recorded as 24, 45, 34 or 35 to reflect its rising nature.

=== Tone sandhi ===
The Zhangzhou dialect has nine tone sandhi rules: only the last syllable of nouns and clause endings remain unchanged by tone sandhi. The two-syllable tone sandhi rules are shown in the table below:

Tone sandhi of first syllable
Original citation tone		Tone sandhi	Example word & sandhi
dark level 44		22	詩 經 /si˦ kiŋ˦/ [si˨ kiŋ˦]
light level 13		22	南 京 /lam˩˧ kiã˦/ [lam˨ kiã˦]
rising 53		44	紙 箱 /tsua˥˧ siɔ̃˦/ [tsua˦ siɔ̃˦]
dark departing 21		53	世 間 /si˨˩ kan˦/ [si˥˧ kan˦]
light departing 22		21	是 非 /si˨ hui˦/ [si˨˩ hui˦]
dark entering 32	coda /-ʔ/	53 (the glottal stop /-ʔ/ is lost)	鐵 釘 /tʰiʔ˧˨ tiŋ˦/ [tʰi˥˧ tiŋ˦]
dark entering 32	coda /-p/, /-t/, /-k/	5	接 收 /tsiap˧˨ siu˦/ [tsiap˥ siu˦]
light entering 121	coda /-ʔ/	21 (the glottal stop /-ʔ/ is lost)	石 山 /tsioʔ˩˨˩ suã˦/ [tsio˨˩ suã˦]
light entering 121	coda /-p/, /-t/, /-k/	21	立 春 /lip˩˨˩ tsʰun˦/ [lip˨˩ tsʰun˦]

== Sources ==
- Cheng, Chin-Chuan (1999). "Quantitative Studies in Min Dialects". In Ting, Pang-Hsin (ed.). Contemporary Studies in Min Dialects. Journal of Chinese Linguistics Monograph Series. Vol. 14. Chinese University Press, Project on Linguistic Analysis. pp. 229–246. JSTOR 23833469.
- Ding, Picus Sizhi (2016). Southern Min (Hokkien) as a Migrating Language: A Comparative Study of Language Shift and Maintenance Across National Borders. Singapore: Springer. ISBN 978-981-287-594-5.
- Douglas, Rev. Carstairs (1873). Chinese-English Dictionary of the Vernacular or Spoken Language of Amoy, with the Principal Variations of the Chang-chew and Chin-chew dialects. London: Trübner & Co.
- Gao, Ran (2001). 漳州方言音系略说 [A Note on the Phonology of the Zhangzhou Dialect]. In Minnan Fangyan Research Laboratory (ed.). 闽南方言·漳州话研究 [Min Nan Fangyan: Research on the Zhangzhou Dialect]. Beijing: 中国文联出版社. pp. 109–116.
- Hirayama, Hisao (1975). 厦门话古调值的内部构拟 [Internal Reconstruction of the Ancient Tone Values of the Xiamen Dialect]. Journal of Chinese Linguistics (in Chinese). 3 (1): 3–15. JSTOR 23749860.
- Huang, Diancheng, ed. (1998). 福建省志·方言志 (in Chinese). Beijing: 方言出版社. ISBN 7-80122-279-2. Archived from the original on 2019-02-10.
- Huang, Yishan (2018). Tones in Zhangzhou: Pitch and Beyond (PDF) (PhD). Australian National University.
- Lin, Baoqing (1992). 漳州方言词汇（一） [Vocabulary of the Zhangzhou Dialect (1)]. Fangyan (in Chinese) (2): 151–160.
- Ma, Zhongqi, ed. (2008). 闽台闽南方言韵书比较研究 (in Chinese). Beijing: China Social Sciences Press. ISBN 978-7-5004-7230-8.
- Phillips, George (1877). "Zaitun Researches: Part V". The Chinese Recorder and Missionary Journal. 8 (2): 117–124.
- Tung, Tung-ho (1959). 四個閩南方言 [Four South Min Dialects]. Bulletin of the Institute of History and Philology. 30: 729–1042.
- Yang, Xiu-ming (2014). 漳州方言阴平调的调形特点与历史演变 [Traits of Yin-ping Tone of Zhangzhou Dialect and the Historical Evolution]. Journal of Minnan Normal University (Philosophy & Social Sciences) (in Chinese) (3): 45–52. doi:10.16007/j.cnki.issn2095-7114.2014.03.042.
- Zhangzhou City Local Chronicles Editorial Board, ed. (1999). Zhangzhou Shizhi 漳州市志 [Zhangzhou Annals] (in Chinese). Vol. 49: 方言. Beijing: China Social Sciences Press. ISBN 978-7-5004-2625-7. Archived from the original on 2019-02-10.
- Zhou, Changji (2012). B1—15、16 闽语. 中国语言地图集 [Language Atlas of China] (in Chinese). Vol. 汉语方言卷 (2nd ed.). Beijing: Commercial Press. pp. 110–115. ISBN 978-7-100-07054-6.
