= Eishun =

Eishun, frequently written as 「永春」("everlasting spring") in Japanese, is the name of a number of Japanese painters:

- Eishun, 15th century yamato-e painter
- Kanō Eishun, 18th century Kanō school painter
- Baiōken Eishun, 18th century ukiyo-e painter and print artist
- Eishun Toshiyasu, active c. 1926-1945
