= Amoy dialect =

Dialect of Hokkien spoken in the city of Xiamen

Amoy
- Amoyese, Amoynese, Xiamenese
- 廈門話 Ē-mn̂g-ōe
- Native to: China
- Region: part of Xiamen (Amoy) (Siming and Huli districts), Haicang and Longhai districts to the west
- Native speakers: 2 million (2021)
- Language family: Sino-Tibetan: Sinitic; Chinese; Min; Coastal Min; Southern Min; Hokkien; Amoy
- Early forms: Proto-Sino-Tibetan: Old Chinese (Note: Min is believed to have split from Old Chinese, rather than Middle Chinese like other varieties of Chinese.); Proto-Min

Language codes
- ISO 639-3: –
- Glottolog: xiam1236
- Linguasphere: 79-AAA-je
- Distribution of Hokkien dialects. Amoy dialect is in magenta.

The Amoy dialect or Xiamen dialect (Chinese: 廈門話; Pe̍h-ōe-jī: Ē-mn̂g-ōe; pinyin: Xiàménhuà), also known as Amoyese, Amoynese, Amoy Hokkien, Xiamenese or Xiamen Hokkien, is a dialect of Hokkien spoken in the city of Xiamen (historically known as "Amoy") and its surrounding metropolitan area, in the southern part of Fujian province. Currently, it is one of the most widely researched and studied varieties of Southern Min. It has historically come to be one of the more standardized varieties.

Amoyese and Taiwanese are both historically mixtures of Quanzhou and Zhangzhou dialects. As such, they are very closely aligned phonologically. There are some differences between the two, especially lexical, as a result of physical separation and the differing histories of mainland China and Taiwan during the 20th century. Amoyese and Taiwanese are mutually intelligible. Intelligibility with other Hokkien, especially inland, is more difficult. By that standard, Amoyese and Taiwanese may be considered dialects of a single language. Ethnolinguistically, however, Amoyese is part of mainland Hokkien.

== History ==
In 1842, as a result of the signing of the Treaty of Nanking, Amoy was designated as a trading port in Fujian. Amoy and Kulangsu rapidly developed, which resulted in a large influx of people from neighboring areas such as Quanzhou and Zhangzhou. The mixture of these various accents formed the basis for the Amoy dialect.

Over the last several centuries, a large number of Hoklo people from these same areas migrated to Taiwan during Dutch, Tungning and Qing rule. The "Amoy dialect" was considered the vernacular of Taiwan. Eventually, the mixture of accents spoken in Taiwan became popularly known as Taiwanese (Chinese: 臺語; pinyin: Táiyǔ; Pe̍h-ōe-jī: Tâi-gí; Japanese: 台湾語; Hepburn: Taiwango) during Imperial Japanese rule. As in American and British English, there are subtle lexical and phonological differences between modern Taiwanese and Amoy Hokkien; however, these differences do not generally pose any barriers to communication.

Amoy dialect speakers also migrated alongside speakers of other varieties of Chinese to Southeast Asia, mainly in Singapore, Malaysia, the Philippines, Indonesia, Brunei, Thailand, Cambodia and Myanmar. The varieties of Hokkien that thus developed in Southeast Asia share many features with the Amoy dialect, with the phonology of Singaporean Hokkien cited as being very close to that of Amoy.

== Vocabulary ==
For further information, read the article: Swadesh list

The spoken Amoy dialect preserves many of the sounds and words from Old Chinese. However, the vocabulary of Amoy was also influenced in its early stages by the Minyue languages spoken by the ancient Minyue peoples.

Below is a Swadesh list for Amoy Hokkien:

- The Amoy Min Nan Swadesh list

=== Literary and colloquial readings ===
Like other languages of Southern Min, Amoy has complex rules for literary and colloquial readings of Chinese characters. For example, the character for big/great, 大, has a vernacular reading of tōa ([tua˧]), but a literary reading of tāi ([tai˧]). Because of the loose nature of the rules governing when to use a given pronunciation, a learner of Amoy must often simply memorize the appropriate reading for a word on a case-by-case basis. For single-syllable words, it is more common to use the vernacular pronunciation.

Disyllabic words illustrating literary–colloquial reading differences
Character	Colloquial word	Colloquial meaning	Colloquial reading	Literary word	Literary meaning	Literary reading
大	大人	adult	tōa-lâng	大師	great master	tāi-su
高	高原	plateau	ko-goân	高長	tall and big (in stature)	kau-chhiâng
樹	樹箬	leaf of a tree	chhiū-hio̍h	樹敵	antagonize, make an enemy of	sū-te̍k
飛	飛虎	mahi-mahi, dorado	pe-hó͘	飛快	at lightning speed	hui-khoài
雨	雨衣	raincoat	hō͘-i	穀雨	the sixth solar term, "Grain Rain"	Kok-ú

Occasionally lexemes composed of the same written characters have different meanings that are differentiated by the reading. Other times, the two variants have no semantic differences (such as with 名片).

Disyllabic words differentiated by literary–colloquial readings
Characters	Colloquial meaning	Colloquial reading	Literary meaning	Literary reading
雨水	rainwater, precipitation	hō͘-chúi	the second solar term, "Rain Water"	Ú-súi
大學	university, college	tōa-o̍h	Great Learning, a classic of Confucian thought	tāi-ha̍k
兩岸	the two banks of e.g. a river	nn̄g-hōaⁿ	cross-strait, in reference to Mainland China and Taiwan	lióng-gān

The vernacular readings are generally thought to predate the literary readings, as is the case with the Min Chinese varieties; the literary readings appear to have evolved from Middle Chinese. The following chart illustrates some of the more commonly seen sound shifts:

Colloquial	Literary	Example			
[p-], [pʰ-]	[h-]	分	pun	hun	divide
[ts-], [tsʰ-], [tɕ-], [tɕʰ-]	[s-], [ɕ-]	成	chiâⁿ	sêng	to become
[k-], [kʰ-]	[tɕ-], [tɕʰ-]	指	kí	chí	finger
[-ã], [-uã]	[-an]	看	khòaⁿ	khàn	to see
[-ʔ]	[-t]	食	chia̍h	si̍t	to eat
[-i]	[-e]	世	sì	sè	world
[-e]	[-a]	家	ke	ka	family
[-ia]	[-i]	企	khiā	khì	to stand

There is also a substratum effect that can result in another reading etymologically unrelated to the character. This borrowed reading or "gloss reading" (simplified Chinese: 训读; traditional Chinese: 訓讀; pinyin: xùndú; Pe̍h-ōe-jī: hùn-tho̍k) may act as an additional vernacular layer, or may supplant the original colloquial reading.

Characters with an additional 'borrowed' reading
Characters	Borrowed reading (with original character, where known)	Colloquial reading	Literary reading
肉	bah	he̍k	lio̍k
黑	o͘ (烏)	(none)	hek
乾	ta (焦)	koaⁿ	kan
高	koâiⁿ (懸)	ko	kau
田	chhân (塍 or 層)	(none)	tiân
人	lâng (儂)	(none)	lîn
多	chōe (濟)	(none)	to
食	chia̍h	si̍t	se̍k

== Phonology ==
=== Initials ===
		Labial	Alveolar	Alveolo- palatal	Velar	Glottal
Stop	voiceless	p	t		k	ʔ
Stop	aspirated	pʰ	tʰ		kʰ	
Stop	voiced	b			ɡ	
Affricate	voiceless		ts	tɕ		
Affricate	aspirated		tsʰ	tɕʰ		
Affricate	voiced		dz	dʑ		
Fricative			s	ɕ		h
Nasal		m	n		ŋ	
Approximant			l			

- Word-initial alveolar consonants /ts, tsʰ, dz/ when occurring before /i/ are pronounced as alveo-palatal sounds [tɕ, tɕʰ, dʑ].
- /l/ can fluctuate freely in initial position as either a flap [ɾ] or voiced alveolar plosive stop [d].
- [ʔ] can occur in both word initial and final position.
- /m ŋ/ when occurring before /m̩ ŋ̍/ can be pronounced as voiceless sounds [m̥], [ŋ̊].

Unlike Mandarin, the Amoy dialect distinguishes between voiced and voiceless unaspirated initial consonants (Mandarin has no voicing of initial consonants). Unlike English, it differentiates between unaspirated and aspirated voiceless initial consonants (as Mandarin does too). In less technical terms, native Amoy speakers have little difficulty in hearing the difference between the following syllables:

	unaspirated		aspirated
bilabial stop	bo 母	po 保	pʰo 抱
velar stop	go 俄	ko 果	kʰo 科
	voiced	voiceless	

However, these fully voiced consonants did not descend from the Early Middle Chinese voiced obstruents, unlike in Wu Chinese. Rather they are derived from the fortition and denasalization of nasal initials.

=== Finals ===
Rimes without codas
	/a/ 阿	/ɔ/ 烏	/i/ 魚	/e/ 火	/o/ 好	/u/ 母	/ai/ 愛	/au/ 抱
/i/-	/ia/ 寫				/io/ 后	/iu/ 救		/iau/ 鳥
/u/-	/ua/ 花		/ui/ 水	/ue/ 話			/uai/ 歪	

Rimes with nasal codas
-/m/		-/n/		-/ŋ/		
/m̩/ 毋	/am/ 暗	/an/ 按		/ŋ̍/ 黃	/aŋ/ 港	/ɔŋ/ 風
/im/ 心	/iam/ 薟	/in/ 今	/iɛn/ 免	/iŋ/ 英	/iaŋ/ 雙	/iɔŋ/ 恭
		/un/ 恩	/uan/ 完			

Nasalized rimes without codas
	/ã/ 三	/ɔ̃/ 魯	/ẽ/ 明		/ãi/ 歹	/ãu/ 腦
/ĩ/ 暝	/iã/ 定			/iũ/ 想		/iãu/ 貓
	/uã/ 山			/uĩ/ 莓	/uãi/ 彎	

- As with other forms of Southern Min, Amoy makes substantial use of nasalization.

Checked rimes
-/p/		-/t/		-/k/			-/ʔ/ with oral vowel							-/ʔ/ with nasal vowel						-/ʔ/ with syllabic nasal	
	/ap/ 十		/at/ 克		/ak/ 六	/ɔk/ 樂		/aʔ/ 鴨	/ɔʔ/ 索	/oʔ/ 學	/eʔ/ 欲	/auʔ/ 落			/ãʔ/ 趿	/ɔ̃ʔ/ 乎	/ẽʔ/ 夾	/ãiʔ/ 唉	/ãuʔ/ 澩	/m̩ʔ/ 摁	/ŋ̍ʔ/ 嗆
/ip/ 急	/iap/ 葉	/it/ 必	/iɛt/ 閲	/ik/~/ek/ 色	/iak/ 煏	/iɔk/ 祝	/iʔ/ 捏	/iaʔ/ 食		/ioʔ/ 尺		/iauʔ/ 藃	/iuʔ/ 搐	/ĩʔ/ 物	/iãʔ/ 嚇				/iãuʔ/ 蟯		
		/ut/ 骨	/uat/ 越				/uʔ/ 嗍	/uaʔ/ 活			/ueʔ/ 喂										

- Final consonants are pronounced as unreleased [p̚ t̚ k̚].

=== Tones ===
Amoy is similar to other Southern Min variants in that it largely preserves the Middle Chinese tone system of six distinct tones in syllables which do not end in a stop consonant and two tones in syllables which do end in a stop consonant (the checked tones). The tones are traditionally numbered from 1 through 8, with 4 and 8 being the checked tones; however, the distinction between traditional tones 2 and 6 (yin rising and yang rising respectively) was lost by the last quarter of the 19th century. Additionally, a large proportion of what would have been tone 6 (yang rising) shifted to tone 7 (yang departing), specifically those with historical voiced obstruent initials, and those with sonorant initials in their vernacular readings. Thus, Amoy exhibits five phonemic tones in syllables not ending in such stop consonants, and two checked tones. (Note: For example, Douglas (1899) [1873] states: In Amoy, though nominally there are eight, yet really there are only seven, as the second tone class, the “chiuⁿ-siaⁿ,” is not divided into two.)

Tone number	Tone name	Tone letter	Chao tone numerals
1	陰平; im-pîⁿ Yin level	˥	55
2	陰上 / 上聲; im-sióng / sióng-siaⁿ Yin rising / Rising	˥˧	53
3	陰去; im-khì/khù Yin falling	˨˩	21
4	陰入; im-li̍p Yin entering	˩ʔ	1ʔ
5	陽平; iông-pîⁿ Yang level	˧˥	35
6 (2)	陽上 / 上聲; iông-sióng / sióng-siaⁿ Yang rising / Rising	˥˧	53
7	陽去; iông-khì/khù Yang falling	˧	33
8	陽入; iông-li̍p Yang entering	˥ʔ	5ʔ

=== Tone sandhi ===
Amoy has extremely extensive tone sandhi rules; in an utterance, only the last syllable pronounced is not affected by the rules. What an 'utterance' is, in the context of this language, is an ongoing topic for linguistic research. For the purpose of this article, an utterance may be considered a word, a phrase, or a short sentence. The diagram illustrates the rules that govern the pronunciation of a tone on each of the syllables affected (that is, all but the last in an utterance):

== Grammar ==
Amoy grammar shares a similar structure to other Chinese dialects, although it is slightly more complex than Mandarin. Moreover, equivalent Amoy and Mandarin particles are usually not cognates.

=== Complement constructions ===
Amoy complement constructions are roughly parallel to Mandarin ones, although there are variations in the choice of lexical term. The following are examples of constructions that Amoy employs.

In the case of adverbs:

伊 走 會 緊
i cháu ē kín
he runs obtains quick
He runs quickly.

Mandarin: tā pǎo de kuài (他跑得快)

In the case of the adverb "very":

伊 走 真 緊
i cháu chin kín
He runs obtains quick
He runs very quickly.

Mandarin: tā pǎo de hěn kuài (他跑得很快)

伊 走 袂 緊
i cháu bōe kín
He runs not quick
He does not run quickly.

Mandarin: tā pǎo bù kuài (他跑不快)

伊 看 會 著
i khòaⁿ ē tio̍h
He see obtains {already achieved}
He can see.

Mandarin: tā kàn de dào (他看得到)

For the negative,

伊 看 袂 著
i khòaⁿ bōe tio̍h
He sees not {already achieved}
He cannot see.

Mandarin: tā kàn bù dào (他看不到)

For the adverb "so," Amoy uses kah (甲) instead of Mandarin de (得):

伊 驚 甲 話 著 講 袂 出來
i kiaⁿ kah ōe tio̍h kóng bōe chhut-lâi
He startled {to the point of} words also say not {come out}
He was so startled, that he could not speak.

Mandarin: tā xià de huà dōu shuō bù chūlái (他嚇得話都說不出來)

=== Negative particles ===
Negative particle syntax is parallel to Mandarin about 70% of the time, although lexical terms used differ from those in Mandarin. For many lexical particles, there is no single standard Hanji character to represent these terms (e.g. m̄, a negative particle, can be variously represented by 毋, 呣, and 唔), but the most commonly used ones are presented below in examples. The following are commonly used negative particles:

1. m̄ (毋/伓) - is not + noun (Mandarin 不, bù)
  i m̄-sī gún lāu-bú. (伊毋是阮老母) "She is not my mother."
2. m̄ (毋/伓) - does not/will not + verb (Mandarin 不, bù)
  i m̄ lâi. (伊毋來) "He will not come."
3. verb + bōe (袂/𣍐 (⿰勿會)) + particle - is not able to (Mandarin 不, bù)
  góa khòaⁿ-bōe-tio̍h. (我看袂著) "I am not able to see it."
4. bōe (袂/𣍐 (⿰勿會)) + helping verb - cannot (opposite of ē 會, "is able to") (Mandarin 不, bù)
  i bōe-hiáu kóng Eng-gú. (伊袂曉講英語) "He can't speak English."
  - helping verbs that go with bōe (袂)
    bōe-sái (袂使) - is not permitted to (Mandarin 不可以 bù kěyǐ)
    bōe-hiáu (袂曉) - does not know how to (Mandarin 不會, búhuì)
    bōe-tàng (袂當) - not able to (Mandarin 不能, bùnéng)
5. mài (莫/勿愛) - do not (imperative) (Mandarin 別, bié)
  mài kóng! (莫講) "Don't speak!"
6. bô (無) - do not + helping verb (Mandarin 不, bù)
  i bô beh lâi. (伊無欲來) "He is not going to come."
  - helping verbs that go with bô (無):
    beh (欲) - want to + verb; will + verb
    ài (愛) - must + verb
    èng-kai (應該) - should + verb
    kah-ì (合意) - like to + verb
7. bô (無) - does not have (Mandarin 沒有, méiyǒu)
  i bô chîⁿ. (伊無錢) "He does not have any money."
8. bô (無) - did not (Mandarin 沒有, méiyǒu)
  i bô lâi. (伊無來) "He did not come."
9. bô (無) - is not + adjective (Mandarin 不, bù)
  i bô súi. (伊無媠/水) "She is not beautiful."
  - hó (好) ("good") is an exception, as it can use both m̄ and bô.

=== Common particles ===
Commonly seen particles include:

- 與 (hō·) - indicates passive voice (Mandarin 被, bèi)

伊 與 人 騙 去
i hō· lâng phiàn khì
"They were cheated."

- 共 (kā) - identifies the object (Mandarin 把, bǎ)

伊 共 錢 交 與 你
i kā chîⁿ kau hō· lí
"He handed the money to you"

- 加 (ke) - "more"

伊 加 食 一 碗
i ke chia̍h chi̍t óaⁿ
"He ate one more bowl."

- 共 (kā) - identifies the object

我 共 你 講
góa kā lí kóng
"I'm telling you."

- 濟 (chōe) - "more"

伊 有 較 濟 的 朋友
i ū khah chōe ê pêng-iú
"He has comparatively many friends."

== Romanization ==
A number of Romanization schemes have been devised for Amoy. Pe̍h-ōe-jī is one of the oldest and best established. However, the Taiwanese Language Phonetic Alphabet has become the romanization of choice for many of the recent textbooks and dictionaries from Taiwan.

Vowels
IPA	Pe̍h-ōe-jī	Tâi-lô	TLPA	BP	MLT	DT	Kana	Phonetic Symbols	Hangul	Example	
IPA	Pe̍h-ōe-jī	Tâi-lô	TLPA	BP	MLT	DT	Kana	Phonetic Symbols	Hangul	Traditional	Simplified
a	a	a	a	a	a	a	アア	ㄚ	ᅡ	亞洲	亚洲
ap	ap	ap	ap	ap	ab/ap	āp/ap	アㇷ゚	ㄚㆴ	압	壓力	压力
at	at	at	at	at	ad/at	āt/at	アッ	ㄚㆵ	앋	警察	警察
ak	ak	ak	ak	ak	ag/ak	āk/ak	アㇰ	ㄚㆻ	악	沃水	沃水
aʔ	ah	ah	ah	ah	aq/ah	āh/ah	アァ	ㄚㆷ	앟	牛肉	牛肉
ã	aⁿ	ann	ann/aN	na	va	ann/aⁿ	アア	ㆩ	앗	三十	三十
ɔ	o͘	oo	oo	oo	o	o	オオ	ㆦ	ᅩ	烏色	乌色
ɔk	ok	ok	ok	ok	og/ok	ok	オㇰ	ㆦㆻ	옥	中國	中国
ɔ̃	oⁿ	onn	oonn/ooN	noo	vo	onn/oⁿ	オオ	ㆧ	옷	否	否
ə	o	o	o	o	ø	or	オ̅オ̅	ㄜ	ᅥ	澳洲	澳洲
o	o	o	o	o	ø	or	ヲヲ	ㄛ	ᅥ	澳洲	澳洲
e	e	e	e	e	e	e	エエ	ㆤ	ᅦ	下晡	下晡
ẽ	eⁿ	enn	enn/eN	ne	ve	enn/eⁿ	エエ	ㆥ	엣	青	青
i	i	i	i	i	i	i	イイ	ㄧ	ᅵ	醫學	医学
iɛn	ian	ian	ian	ian	ien	ian/en	イェヌ	ㄧㄢ	엔	鉛筆	铅笔
iəŋ	eng	ing	ing	ing	eng	ing	イェン	ㄧㄥ	영	英國	英国
iək	ek	ik	ik	ik	eg/ek	ik	イェㇰ	ㄧㆻ	역	翻譯	翻译
ĩ	iⁿ	inn	inn/iN	ni	vi	inn/iⁿ	イイ	ㆪ	잇	病院	病院
ai	ai	ai	ai	ai	ai	ai	アイ	ㄞ	ᅢ	愛情	爱情
aĩ	aiⁿ	ainn	ainn/aiN	nai	vai	ainn/aiⁿ	アイ	ㆮ	앳	載	载
au	au	au	au	au	au	au	アウ	ㆯ	알	歐洲	欧洲
am	am	am	am	am	am	am	アム	ㆰ	암	暗時	暗时
ɔm	om	om	om	om	om	om	オム	ㆱ	옴	參	参
m̩	m	m	m	m	m	m	ム	ㆬ	음	阿姆	阿姆
ɔŋ	ong	ong	ong	ong	ong	ong	オン	ㆲ	옹	王梨	王梨
ŋ̍	ng	ng	ng	ng	ng	ng	ン	ㆭ	응	黃色	黄色
u	u	u	u	u	u	u	ウウ	ㄨ	ᅮ	有無	有无
ua	oa	ua	ua	ua	oa	ua	ヲア	ㄨㄚ	ᅪ	歌曲	歌曲
ue	oe	ue	ue	ue	oe	ue	ヲエ	ㄨㆤ	ᅰ	講話	讲话
uai	oai	uai	uai	uai	oai	uai	ヲァイ	ㄨㄞ	ᅫ	奇怪	奇怪
uan	oan	uan	uan	uan	oan	uan	ヲァヌ	ㄨㄢ	왠	人員	人员
ɨ	i	ir	ir	i	i	i	ウ̅ウ̅	ㆨ	ᅵ	豬肉	猪肉
(i)ũ	(i)uⁿ	(i)unn	(i)unn/uN	n(i)u	v(i)u	(i)unn/uⁿ	ウウ	ㆫ	윳	舀水	舀水

Consonants
IPA	Pe̍h-ōe-jī	Tâi-lô	TLPA	BP	MLT	DT	Kana	Phonetic Symbols	Hangul	Example	
IPA	Pe̍h-ōe-jī	Tâi-lô	TLPA	BP	MLT	DT	Kana	Phonetic Symbols	Hangul	Traditional	Simplified
p	p	p	p	b	p	b	パア	ㄅ	ᄇ	報紙	报纸
b	b	b	b	bb	b	bh	バア	ㆠ	ᄈ	閩南	闽南
pʰ	ph	ph	ph	p	ph	p	パ̣ア	ㄆ	ᄑ	普通	普通
m	m	m	m	bbn	m	m	マア	ㄇ	ᄆ	請問	请问
t	t	t	t	d	t	d	タア	ㄉ	ᄃ	豬肉	猪肉
tʰ	th	th	th	t	th	t	タ̣ア	ㄊ	ᄐ	普通	普通
n	n	n	n	ln	n	n	ナア	ㄋ	ᄂ	過年	过年
nŋ	nng	nng	nng	lng	nng	nng	ヌン	ㄋㆭ		雞卵	鸡卵
l	l	l	l	l	l	l	ラア	ㄌ	ᄅ	樂觀	乐观
k	k	k	k	g	k	g	カア	ㄍ	ᄀ	價值	价值
ɡ	g	g	g	gg	g	gh	ガア	ㆣ	ᄁ	牛奶	牛奶
kʰ	kh	kh	kh	k	kh	k	カ̣ア	ㄎ	ᄏ	客廳	客厅
h	h	h	h	h	h	h	ハア	ㄏ	ᄒ	煩惱	烦恼
tɕi	chi	tsi	zi	zi	ci	zi	チイ	ㄐ	ᄌ	支持	支持
dʑi	ji	ji	ji	li	ji	r	ジイ	ㆢ	ᄍ	漢字	汉字
tɕʰi	chhi	tshi	ci	ci	chi	ci	チ̣イ	ㄑ	ᄎ	支持	支持
ɕi	si	si	si	si	si	si	シイ	ㄒ	ㅅ	是否	是否
ts	ch	ts	z	z	z	z	サ̅ア	ㄗ	ᄌ	報紙	报纸
dz	j	j	j	l	j	r	ザア	ㆡ	ᄍ	熱天	热天
tsʰ	chh	tsh	c	c	zh	c	サ̣̅ア	ㄘ	ᄎ	参加	参加
s	s	s	s	s	s	s	サア	ㄙ	ㅅ	司法	司法

Tones
Tone name	IPA	Pe̍h-ōe-jī	Tâi-lô	TLPA	BP	MLT	DT	Kana (normal vowels)	Kana (nasal vowels)	Phonetic Symbols	Hangul	Example	
Tone name	IPA	Pe̍h-ōe-jī	Tâi-lô	TLPA	BP	MLT	DT	Kana (normal vowels)	Kana (nasal vowels)	Phonetic Symbols	Hangul	Traditional	Simplified
Yin level (陰平 1)	a˥	a	a	a1	ā	af	a	アア	アア	ㄚ	ᄋ	公司	公司
Yin rising (陰上 2)	a˥˧	á	á	a2	ǎ	ar	à	アア	アア	ㄚˋ	ᄅ	報紙	报纸
Yin departing (陰去 3)	a˨˩	à	à	a3	à	ax	â	アア	アア	ㄚ˪	ᄂ	興趣	兴趣
Yin entering (陰入 4)	ap˩ at˩ ak˩ aʔ˩	ap at ak ah	ah	a4	āp āt āk āh	ab ad ag aq	āp āt āk āh	アㇷ゚ アッ アㇰ アァ	アㇷ゚ アッ アㇰ アァ	ㄚㆴ ㄚㆵ ㄚㆻ ㄚㆷ	ᄋ	血壓 警察 中國 牛肉	血压 警察 中国 牛肉
Yang level (陽平 5)	a˧˥	â	â	a5	ǎ	aa	ǎ	アア	アア	ㄚˊ	ᄉ	人員	人员
Yang rising (陽上 6)		ǎ	ǎ	a6		aar						老爸	老爸
Yang departing (陽去 7)	a˧	ā	ā	a7	â	a	ā	アア	アア	ㄚ˫	ᄀ	草地	草地
Yang entering (陽入 8)	ap˥ at˥ ak˥ aʔ˥	a̍p a̍t a̍k a̍h	a̍h	a8	áp át ák áh	ap at ak ah	ap at ak ah	アㇷ゚ アッ アㇰ アァ	アㇷ゚ アッ アㇰ アァ	ㄚㆴ˙ ㄚㆵ˙ ㄚㆻ˙ ㄚㆷ˙	ᄇ	配合 法律 文學 歇熱	配合 法律 文学 歇热
High rising (9)	a˥˥	ă	a̋	a9			á				ㅋ	昨昏	昨昏
Neutral (0)	a˨	--a	--ah	a0		~a	å					入去	入去

- Note: The bopomofo extended characters in the zhuyin row require a UTF-8 font capable of displaying Unicode values 31A0–31B7 (ex. Code2000 true type font).

== See also ==
- Amoy
- Southern Min
- Hokkien
  - Quanzhou & Zhangzhou
  - Taiwanese
  - Penang Hokkien
  - Medan Hokkien
  - Lan-nang
- Written Hokkien
- Holopedia
- Speak Hokkien Campaign
- Languages of China
- Languages of Taiwan
- Languages of Singapore
- List of prestige dialects
- Amoy Min Nan Swadesh list
- Sino-Tibetan Swadesh lists

== Sources ==
- Barclay, Thomas (1923). Supplement to Dictionary of the Vernacular or Spoken Language of Amoy. Shanghai: The Commercial Press. hdl:2027/mdp.39015051950106.
- Douglas, Carstairs (1899) [1873]. Chinese-English Dictionary of the Vernacular or Spoken Language of Amoy (2nd ed.). London: Presbyterian Church of England. OL 25126855M.
- Huanan, Wang 王華南 (2007). Ài shuō Táiyǔ wǔqiān nián: Táiyǔ shēngyùn zhīměi 愛說台語五千年 : 台語聲韻之美 [To Understand the Beauty of Taiwanese] (in Chinese). Taibei Shi: Gao tan wenhua chuban. ISBN 978-986-7101-47-1.
- Li, Shunliang 李順涼 (2004). Hong, Hongyuan 洪宏元 (ed.). Huá-Tái-Yīng cíhuì jùshì duìzhào jí / Chinese-Taiwanese-English Lexicon 華台英詞彙句式對照集 / Chinese-Taiwanese-English Lexicon (in Chinese and English). Taibei Shi: Wunan tushu chuban gufen youxian gongsi. ISBN 957-11-3822-3.
- MacGowan, John (1898). A Manual of the Amoy Colloquial (PDF) (4th ed.). Amoy: Chui Keng Ton. hdl:2027/nyp.33433081879649.
- Maclay, Howard S. (1953). The Phonology of Amoy Chinese. University of New Mexico.
- Sung, Margaret M. Y. (1973). "A Study of Literary and Colloquial Amoy Chinese". Journal of Chinese Linguistics. 1 (3): 414–436. JSTOR 2375286.
- Tang, Tingchi 湯廷池 (1999). Mǐnnányǔ yǔfǎ yánjiū shìlùn 閩南語語法研究試論 [Papers on Southern Min Syntax] (in Chinese and English). Taibei Shi: Taiwan xuesheng shuju. ISBN 957-15-0948-5.
- Zhou, Changji 周长楫; Li, Rong 李荣 (1993). Xiàmén fāngyán cídiǎn 厦门方言词典 [Xiamen Topolect Dictionary] (in Chinese) (1st ed.). Nanjing: 江苏教育出版社 Jiangsu Educational Press. ISBN 978-7-5343-1995-2.
- Zwicky, Arnold M.; Kaisse, Ellen M.; Chen, Matthew Y. (May 1987). "The syntax of Xiamen tone sandhi". Phonology Yearbook. 4 (1): 109–149. doi:10.1017/S0952675700000798.
