= Medan Hokkien =

Chinese dialect spoken in parts of Indonesia

- 棉蘭福建話; Mî-lân Hok-kiàn-ōa (POJ)
- Native to: Indonesia
- Region: Medan, Pematangsiantar, Kisaran, Rantau Prapat, Tebing Tinggi, Tanjungbalai, Binjai, Jakarta and other cities in North Sumatra, Java and other regions of Indonesia with a significant Chinese population
- Native speakers: 800.000~1.000.000 (2010)
- Language family: Sino-Tibetan: Sinitic; Chinese; Min; Coastal Min; Southern Min; Hokkien; Zhangzhou; Penang Hokkien; Medan Hokkien
- Early forms: Proto-Sino-Tibetan: Old Chinese (Note: Min is believed to have split from Old Chinese, rather than Middle Chinese like other varieties of Chinese.); Proto-Min
- Writing system: Latin (Indonesian orthography)

Language codes
- ISO 639-3: nan for Southern Min/Min Nan which encompasses a variety of languages and dialects including "Penang-Medan Hokkien"/"Medan Hokkien"
- Glottolog: None
- Linguasphere: 79-AAA-jek

Medan Hokkien is a local variety of Hokkien spoken amongst Chinese Indonesians in Medan, North Sumatra, Indonesia. It is the lingua franca in Medan as well as the surrounding cities in the province of North Sumatra. It is also spoken in some Medan Chinese migrant communities such as in Jakarta. Medan Hokkien is a subdialect of the Zhangzhou (漳州) Hokkien, particularly of Haicheng (海澄) subdialect. It borrows heavily from Teochew, Deli Malay and Indonesian.

It is predominantly a spoken dialect: Vernacular Hokkien, including Medan Hokkien, is traditionally passed down orally and is rarely transcribed in written Hokkien. Moreover, Indonesia's New Order Era imposed martial laws to suppress and ban display of Chinese characters and Chinese tradition in public. However, with the rise of social media, Medan Hokkien is often transcribed in EYD, ignoring tone markings altogether.

When comparing Medan Hokkien to other Hokkien dialects spoken in countries such as Malaysia and Singapore, Medan Hokkien can be relatively intelligible. It is, however, most similar to Penang Hokkien. Both are strikingly similar that it could be difficult to tell the difference between the two if a Medan Hokkien speaker does not heavily mix Deli Malay and Indonesian borrowings in their conversation.

== History ==
Medan Hokkien’s origin could be linguistically traced back to Penang Hokkien and its Kedahan roots. Early presence of Chinese in Medan could be found in Pulau Kampai and Kota China, with archaeological discoveries pointing out the presence of Chinese traders as far back as 12th century CE. When John Anderson was sent for a diplomatic mission to eastern coasts of Sumatra in 1823, he recounted the presence very few Chinese in what was known as Deli, and around 50 to 100 Chinese in Asahan. Trade between eastern coasts of Sumatra and Penang and Malacca was already very much established by then.

The rise of Deli as a major exporter of Tobacco brought in great influx of Chinese Coolies (indentured labourers) from Penang. By 1890, Chinese Coolies in East Sumatra rose up to 53,806. The significance of Penang's role in Deli's economy and the influence of Penang's elite Babanyonya and the Five Big Kongsi cannot be denied. Cheah Choo Yew (1841-1931) was one of the founding fathers of Cheah Kongsi was native to Langkat, East Sumatra. Khoo Cheow Teong (1840-1916) was the great grandson of Koh Lay Huan (Penang's first Kapitan China) and grandson of Khoo Wat Seng (founding father of Khoo Kongsi). He was the Kapitan Cina of Asahan for 26 years. Penang's famous Cheong Fatt Tze was also related to Medan's Kapitan Cina Tjong A Fie and Tjong Yong Hian, and the three of them monopolised major commodities in East Sumatra. The cultural link between Penang and Medan was beyond mere proximity. One could even find strong similarities in rituals such as worship of Datuk and in mutually shared Peranakan dishes.

Russell Jones, in his article 'The Chiangchew Hokkiens, the true pioneers in Nanyang' took the effort to confirm the early presence of Zhangzhou Hokkiens, not only in Penang, but also in Malacca, Batavia and the rest of the archipelago. In addition, the uncanny similarity of the Malay loanwords (batu, mana, binatang, tapi), 'Hokkien-ised' Malay terms (lokun, sukak) and as well as Kedahan dialect (gatai) in Penang Hokkien that has become canonic to Medan Hokkien vocabularies is evident of its lineage.

Medan Hokkien also had substantial influence from Teochew dialect, due to the dominant presence of Teochew coolies during the Tobacco boom. The events of Japanese invasion, East Sumatra revolution and New Order regime sundered the cross-strait cultural kinship between the two cities. The two dialects ever since diverged and evolved separately, where Penang Hokkien became more Anglicised and Mandarinised, while Medan Hokkien became more Indonesianised.

== See also ==
- Penang Hokkien
- Hoklo people
- Hokkien culture
- Hokkien architecture
- Written Hokkien
- Hokkien media
- Taiwanese Hokkien
- Singapore Hokkien
- Southern Malaysia Hokkien
- Philippine Hokkien
- Holopedia
- Speak Hokkien Campaign
