= Penang Hokkien =

Dialect of Hokkien spoken in parts of Malaysia

- 庇能福建話; Pī-néeng Hok-kiàn-uā (Tâi-lô); Pī-né͘ng Hok-kiàn-ōa (Pe̍͘h-ōa-jī)
- Native to: Malaysia
- Region: Penang, parts of Kedah, northern Perak (Kerian, Larut and Hulu Perak) and Perlis
- Language family: Sino-Tibetan: Sinitic; Chinese; Min; Coastal Min; Southern Min; Hokkien; Zhangzhou; Penang Hokkien
- Early forms: Proto-Sino-Tibetan: Old Chinese (Note: Min is believed to have split from Old Chinese, rather than Middle Chinese like other varieties of Chinese.); Proto-Min
- Writing system: Latin: Modified Tâi-lô; Modified Pe̍h-ōe-jī (Pe̍͘h-ōa-jī); Ad hoc methods Chinese Characters; Traditional; Hangul (Experimental); Hokkien Imji; Mixed script comprising the above methods

Language codes
- ISO 639-3: nan for Southern Min / Min Nan which encompasses a variety of Hokkien dialects including "Penang-Medan Hokkien" / "Penang Hokkien".
- Glottolog: None
- Linguasphere: 79-AAA-jek
- IETF: nan-u-sd-my07

Penang Hokkien
- Traditional Chinese: 庇能福建話
- Tâi-lô: Pī-néeng Hok-kiàn-uā
Transcriptions
Southern Min
- Hokkien POJ: Pī-né͘ng Hok-kiàn-ōa / Pī-nɛ́ng (Note: The open-mid front unrounded vowel /ɛ/ is a feature of Zhangzhou Hokkien, from which Penang Hokkien is derived. Tâi-lô records this vowel as ⟨ee⟩. It is much less commonly written in Pe̍͘h-ōa-jī as it has merged with ⟨e⟩ in mainstream Taiwanese and Amoy Hokkien. However it may be written as a distinct vowel in Pe̍͘h-ōa-jī using ⟨ɛ⟩ or ⟨e͘ ⟩ (with a dot above right, by analogy with ⟨o͘ ⟩).) Hok-kiàn-ōa
- Tâi-lô: Pī-néeng Hok-kiàn-uā

Alternative Chinese name
- Traditional Chinese: 檳城福建話
- Simplified Chinese: 槟城福建话
- Tâi-lô: Pin-siânn Hok-kiàn-uā
Transcriptions
Standard Mandarin
- Hanyu Pinyin: Bīnchéng Fújiànhuà
Southern Min
- Hokkien POJ: Pin-siâⁿ Hok-kiàn-ōa
- Tâi-lô: Pin-siânn Hok-kiàn-uā

Flag of Penang, where Penang Hokkien is natively spoken

A man speaking Penang Hokkien

Penang Hokkien (Chinese: 庇能福建話; Pe̍h-ōe-jī: Pī-né͘ng Hok-kiàn-ōa; Tâi-lô: Pī-néeng Hok-kiàn-uā; IPA: /pi˨˩nɛŋ˦˥ hɔk̚˦kiɛn˥˧ua˨˩/) is a local variant of Hokkien spoken in Penang, Malaysia. It is spoken natively by 63.9% of Penang's Chinese community, and also by some Penangite Indians and Penangite Malays.

It was once the lingua franca among the majority Chinese population in Penang, Kedah, Perlis and northern Perak. However, since the 1980s, many younger speakers have shifted towards Malaysian Mandarin under the Speak Mandarin Campaign in Chinese-medium schools in Malaysia, even though Mandarin was not previously spoken in these regions. Mandarin has been adopted as the only language of instruction in Chinese schools and, from the 1980s to mid-2010s, these schools penalised students and teachers for using non-Mandarin varieties of Chinese. A 2021 study found that Penang Hokkien was a 'threatened' language in the Expanded Graded Intergenerational Disruption Scale, due to the encroachment of Mandarin.

Penang Hokkien is a subdialect of Zhangzhou (漳州; Tsiang-tsiu) Hokkien, with extensive use of Malay and English loanwords. Compared to dialects in Fujian (福建; Hok-kiàn) province, it most closely resembles the variety spoken in the district of Haicang (海滄; Hái-tshng) in Longhai (龍海; Liông-hái) county and in the districts of Jiaomei (角美; Kak-bí) and Xinglin (杏林; Hēng-lîm) in neighbouring Xiamen (廈門; Ēe-muî) prefecture. In Southeast Asia, similar dialects are spoken in the states bordering Penang (Kedah, Perlis and northern Perak), as well as in Medan and North Sumatra, Indonesia. It is markedly distinct from Southern Peninsular Malaysian Hokkien, Singaporean Hokkien and Taiwanese Hokkien.

== Orthography ==
Penang Hokkien is largely a spoken language, however it can be written in Chinese characters (唐人字; Tn̂g-lâng-jī), or romanised in the Latin script (紅毛字; Âng-môo-jī). Penang Hokkien has a growing body of written, particularly romanised material, thanks largely in part to its increasing online presence on social media. Many topics focus on the language itself such as dictionaries and learning materials. This is linked to efforts to preserve, revitalise and promote the language as part of Penang's cultural heritage, due to increasing awareness of the loss of Penang Hokkien usage among younger generations in favour of Mandarin and English. The standard romanisation systems commonly used in these materials are based on Tâi-lô and Pe̍͘h-ōa-jī, with varying modifications to suit Penang Hokkien phonology.

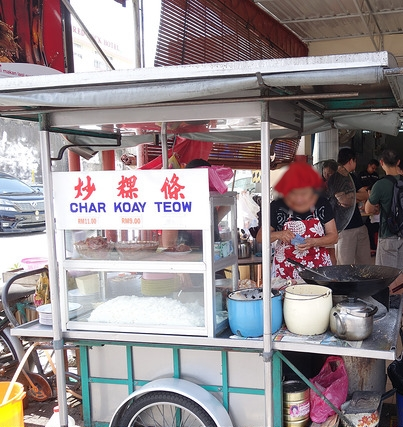
A Char Koay Teow stall. An example of how a Penangite writes Penang Hokkien using ad hoc methods.

The Hokkien Language Association of Penang (Persatuan Bahasa Hokkien Pulau Pinang; 庇能福建話協會) is one such organisation which promotes the language's usage and revitalisation. Through their Speak Hokkien Campaign they promote a Tâi-lô based system modified to suit the phonology of Penang Hokkien and its loanwords. This system is used throughout this article and its features are detailed below.

The Speak Hokkien Campaign also promotes the use of traditional Chinese characters derived from recommended character lists for written Hokkien published by Taiwan's Ministry of Education.

Most native-speakers are not aware of these standardised systems and resort to ad hoc methods of romanisation based on English, Malay and Pinyin spelling rules. These methods are in common use for many proper names and food items, e.g. Char Kway Teow (炒粿條; tshá-kúe-tiâu). These spellings are often inconsistent and highly variable with several alternate spellings being well established, e.g. Char Koay Teow. These methods, which are more intuitive to the average native-speaker, are the basis of non-standard romanisation systems used in some written material.

== Phonology ==
=== Consonants ===
Initials
		Labial	Alveolar		Palatal	Velar	Glottal
		Labial	plain	sibilant	Palatal	Velar	Glottal
Nasal		m [m] 名 (miâ)	n [n] 爛 (nuā)			ng [ŋ] 硬 (ngēe)	
Plosive/ Affricate	plain	p [p] 比 (pí)	t [t] 大 (tuā)	ts [ts] 姊 (tsí)		k [k] 教 (kàu)	[ʔ] 影 (iánn)
Plosive/ Affricate	aspirated	ph [pʰ] 脾 (phî)	th [tʰ] 拖 (thua)	tsh [tsʰ] 飼 (tshī)		kh [kʰ] 扣 (khàu)	
Plosive/ Affricate	voiced	b [b] 米 (bí)	d [d] tsian-doi (煎蕊)	j [dz] 字 (jī)		g [g] 牛 (gû)	
Fricative		f [f] sóo-fá (沙發)		s [s] 時 (sî)	sh [ʃ] kú-shérn (古申)		h [h] 喜 (hí)
Lateral			l [l] 賴 (luā)				
Approximant			r [ɹ] ríng-gi̋t (令吉)		y [j] sa-yang (捎央)	w [w] 我 (wá)	

- Unlike other dialects of Hokkien, alveolar affricates and fricatives remain the same and do not undergo palatalisation to become alveolo-palatal before /i/, e.g. 時 [si] instead of [ɕi].
- Words that begin with a null initial, i.e. begin with a vowel without a preceding consonant may feature an initial glottal stop /ʔ/, this is not indicated in writing.
- The consonants ⟨w⟩ and ⟨y⟩ are only used in the spelling of loanwords. They may be analysed in terms of native Hokkien phonology as beginning with a null initial and may instead be spelled with ⟨u⟩ and ⟨i⟩ respectively, e.g. 我 wá/uá and 捎央 sa-yang/sa-iang.
- The consonants ⟨d⟩, ⟨f⟩, ⟨sh⟩ and ⟨r⟩ are only used in loanwords.

Finals
	Bilabial	Alveolar	Velar	Glottal
Nasal	-m [m] 暗 (àm)	-n [n] 安 (an)	-ng [ŋ] 紅 (âng)	
Plosive	-p [p̚] 答 (tap)	-t [t̚] 殺 (sat)	-k [k̚] 角 (kak)	-h [ʔ] 鴨 (ah)

Syllabic consonant
	Bilabial	Velar
Nasal	m [m̩] 毋 (m̄)	ng [ŋ̍] 霜 (sng)

=== Vowels ===
Monophthongs
	Front		Back	
	Simple	Nasal	Simple	Nasal
Close	i [i] 伊 (i)	inn [ĩ] 圓 (înn)	u [u] 有 (ū)	
Close-Mid	e [e] 會 (ē)		o [o] 蠔 (ô)	
Open-Mid	ee [ɛ] 下 (ēe)	enn [ɛ̃] 嬰 (enn)	oo [ɔ] 烏 (oo)	onn [ɔ̃] 嗚 (onn)
Open	a [a] 亞 (a)	ann [ã] 餡 (ānn)		

Diphthongs & Triphthongs
Diphthong					Triphthong
ai [ai] 愛 (ài)	ia [ia] 椰 (iâ)	io [io] 腰 (io)	iu [iu] 油 (iû)	ue [ue] 鍋 (ue)	iau [iau] 枵 (iau)
au [au] 後 (āu)	ia [iɛ] 燕 (iàn)*	ioo [iɔ] 娘 (niôo)*	ua [ua] 話 (uā)	ui [ui] 為 (uī)	uai [uai] 歪 (uai)

- In the Tâi-lô system for Penang Hokkien, nasal vowels are indicated using final ⟨-nn⟩, while Pe̍͘h-ōa-jī uses superscript ⟨◌ⁿ⟩. Vowel nasalisation occurs in words that have nasal initials (⟨m-⟩, ⟨n-⟩, ⟨ng-⟩), however, this is not explicitly indicated in writing with either ⟨-nn⟩ or ⟨◌ⁿ⟩, e.g. 卵 nūi (/nuĩ/) instead of nūinn/nūiⁿ.
  For most speakers who are not familiar with Tâi-lô or Pe̍͘h-ōa-jī, nasalisation is commonly indicated by putting an ⟨n⟩ after the initial consonant of a word. This is commonly seen for the popular Penang delicacy Tau Sar Pneah (豆沙餅; tāu-sa-piánn). In other instances, nasalisation may not be indicated at all, such as in Popiah (薄餅; po̍h-piánn), or as in the common last name Ooi (黃; Uînn).
- The final ⟨ioo⟩ is only written in conjunction with words that have an initial ⟨n-⟩, e.g. 娘 niôo. In this instance it is pronounced /iɔ̃/ and is a variant of ⟨ionn⟩, with nasalisation instead indicated by the nasal initial.
- The rime ⟨ionn⟩ is a variant pronunciation of ⟨iaunn⟩. The two may be used interchangeably in Penang Hokkien, e.g. 張 tiaunn/tionn, 羊 iâunn/iônn.
- When ⟨ia⟩ is followed by final ⟨-n⟩ or ⟨-t⟩, it is pronounced [iɛ], with ⟨ian⟩ and ⟨iat⟩ being pronounced as [iɛn] and [iɛt̚] respectively.
  In speech, these sounds are often reduced to [ɛn] and [ɛt̚], e.g. 免 mián/mén.
- The diphthong /ua/ may be spelled ⟨wa⟩ in loanwords, e.g. 我 wá/uá.
- The diphthong /ia/ may be spelled ⟨ya⟩ in loanwords, e.g. sa-yang/sa-iang 捎央.
- There are clear distinction between /e/ and /ɛ/ vowel in Penang Hokkien. For example, the term 家 (home) is pronounced as /kɛ/ (Tâi-lô: ⟨kee⟩, Pe̍͘h-ōa-jī: ⟨ke͘⟩), while 雞 (chicken) is pronounced as /ke/, which is transcribed as ⟨ke⟩ in both Tâi-lô and Pe̍͘h-ōa-jī. However, a lot of Penang Hokkien Tâi-lô or Pe̍͘h-ōa-jī users were prone to ignore the difference. Reasons being the absence of formal letter on /ɛ/ from the orthodox Pe̍h-ōe-jī which is based on Amoy accent, and there are lack of support from most mainstream POJ input methods for the letter ⟨e͘⟩. Despite the existence of formal notation of /ɛ/ in Tâi-lô as ⟨ee⟩, some Tâi-lô users were seems to neglect it too, possibly due to the influence from Taiwanese online resources which don't include letter /ee/ and not aware of it.

Non-native vowels (used in loanwords)
Tâi-lô	IPA	Example	Note
er	[ə]	bēr-liân	Occurs in Quanzhou accented varieties of Hokkien such as those spoken in Southern Malaysia and Singapore. Used in Malay and English loanwords.
y	[y]	豬腸粉 tsý-tshiông-fân	Used in Cantonese loanwords, may be pronounced as ⟨i⟩.
ei	[ei]	無釐頭 môu-lêi-thāu	Used in Cantonese loanwords.
eoi	[ɵy]	濕濕碎 sa̋p--sa̋p--sêoi	An alternate pronunciation of ⟨ue⟩ due to Cantonese influence. Used in Cantonese loanwords, may be pronounced as ⟨ue⟩.
oi	[ɔi]	糜 môi	Used in Malay, English, Cantonese and Teochew loanwords. Replaces ⟨ol⟩ in Malay loanwords, e.g. bo̍t-toi 瓿瓵 (botol), tsian-doi 煎蕊 (cendol). Note: The change from final ⟨-l⟩ in Standard Malay to ⟨-i⟩ is a general feature of Penang Malay, the local variety from which Penang Hokkien borrows. This phonological change can be seen in other loanwords from Penang Malay, e.g. sām-bai 參峇 (sambal).
ou	[ou]	大佬 tāi-lôu	Used in Cantonese and Teochew loanwords.

=== Rhymes ===
Vowel(s)	Open		Nasal			Plosive			
Vowel(s)	[-]	[◌̃]	[m]	[n]	[ŋ]	[p̚]	[t̚]	[k̚]	[ʔ]
[a]	a	ann	am	an	ang	ap	at	ak	ah
[ai]	ai	ainn							aih
[au]	au								auh
[e]	e				eng			ek	eh
[ɛ]	ee	enn	em*	en*	eeng*		et*	eek*	eeh
[ə]	er*			ern*			ert*		erh*
[ei]	ei*								
[i]	i	inn	im	in	ing*	ip	it	ik*	ih
[ia]	ia	iann	iam		iang	iap		iak	iah
[iɛ]				ian			iat		
[iau]	iau	iaunn							
[io]	io								ioh
[iɔ]	ioo*	ionn			iong			iok	
[iu]	iu								

Vowel(s)	Open		Nasal			Plosive			
Vowel(s)	[-]	[◌̃]	[m]	[n]	[ŋ]	[p̚]	[t̚]	[k̚]	[ʔ]
[o]	o		um*		ung*			uk*	oh
[ɔ]	oo	onn	om	on*	ong		ot*	ok	ooh
[ɔi]	oi*								
[ou]	ou*								
[u]	u			un			ut		uh
[ua]	ua	uann		uan	uang*		uat		uah
[uai]	uai	uainn							
[ue]	ue								ueh
[ui]	ui	uinn							
[y]	y*			yn*					
[ɵy]	eoi*								
[m̩]	m		－						
[ŋ̍]	ng		－						

- * Used in loanwords, variants and onomatopoeia

=== Tones ===
In Penang Hokkien, the two Departing tones (3rd & 7th) are virtually identical, and may not be distinguished except in their sandhi forms. Most native speakers of Penang Hokkien are therefore only aware of four tones in unchecked syllables (high, low, rising, high falling), and two Entering tones (high and low) in checked syllables. In most systems of romanisation, this is accounted as seven tones altogether. The tones are:

Penang Hokkien tones
	Upper/Dark (陰)					Lower/Light (陽)				
	No.	Name	TL	Contour	Sandhied	No.	Name	TL	Contour	Sandhied
Level (平)	1	陰平 im-piânn	a	[˦˦] (44)	[˨˩] (21)	5	陽平 iông-piânn	â	[˨˧] (23)	[˨˩] (21)
Rising (上)	2	上聲 sióng-siann	á	[˥˧] (53)	[˦˦] (44)	－				
Rising (上)	2	上聲 sióng-siann	á	[˦˦˥] (445)	[˦˦] (44)	－				
Departing (去)	3	陰去 im-khì	à	[˨˩] (21)	[˥˧] (53)	7	陽去 iông-khì	ā	[˨˩] (21)	[˨˩] (21)
Departing (去)	3	陰去 im-khì	à	[˨˩] (21)	[˦˦] (44)	7	陽去 iông-khì	ā	[˨˩] (21)	[˨˩] (21)
Entering (入)	4	陰入 im-ji̍p	a◌	[ʔ˧] (3)	[ʔ˦] (4)	8	陽入 iông-ji̍p	a̍◌	[ʔ˦] (4)	[ʔ˧] (3)
Note	Entering tones (4 & 8) only occur in closed syllables where ◌ represents either -p, -t, -k, or -h.									

The names of the tones no longer bear any relation to the tone contours. The (upper) Rising (2nd) tone has two variants in Penang Hokkien, a high falling tone [˥˧] (53) and a high rising tone [˦˦˥] (445). The high falling tone [˥˧] (53) is more common among the older generations while in the younger generations there has been a shift towards the use of the high rising tone [˦˦˥] (445). When the 3rd tone is sandhied to the 2nd tone, the high falling variant [˥˧] (53) is used, however some speakers may sandhi the 3rd tone to the 1st tone [˦] (44). As in Amoy and Zhangzhou, there is no lower Rising (6th) tone.

==== Tone sandhi ====
Penang Hokkien, like other Hokkien dialects albeit less extensive, features tone sandhi (變調; piàn-tiāu), a process where the tone of a character changes if it is followed by another character as part of a multisyllabic compound. When a character is read in isolation as a monosyllabic word, or as the final character in a multisyllabic compound, it is pronounced with its "original tone" (本調; pún-tiāu). Within a multisyllabic compound, every character, except for the one in the final position undergoes tone sandhi. For example, the word 牛 gû in isolation is pronounced with an ascending tone, [˨˧] (23), but when it combines with a following syllable, as in 牛肉 gû-bah, it undergoes tone sandhi and is pronounced with a low tone, [˨˩] (21). Meanwhile 肉 bah in the final position is pronounced with its original tone [ʔ˧] (3). This process occurs regardless of the length of the compound, for example, in 牛肉粿條湯 gû-bah-kué-tiâu-thng, the first 4 characters are pronounced with their sandhied tone, while only the final character 湯 thng, is pronounced with its original tone.

In both Tâi-lô and Pe̍͘h-ōa-jī based romanisation systems, compounds are indicated with the use of hyphens linking the individual syllables. Single hyphens (-) are most often used and linked syllables undergo tone sandhi as described above. Double hyphens (--) are used in instances where the preceding syllable does not undergo tone sandhi. Tone marks always show the original tone, and do not change to indicate the sandhied tone in a compound.

1st	→	7th	←	5th
↑	(↖)	↓
2nd	←	3rd
4th	↔	8th

The general tone sandhi rules for Penang Hokkien are as follows:

- 5th becomes 7th
- 7th becomes 3rd
- 3rd becomes 2nd (for some speakers becomes 1st)
- 2nd becomes 1st
- 1st becomes 7th

Checked syllables (-p, -t, -k, -h):

- 4th becomes 8th
- 8th becomes 4th

Although the two departing tones (3rd & 7th) are virtually identical in Penang Hokkien, in their sandhi forms they become [˥˧] (53) and [˨˩] (21) and are thus easily distinguishable.

==== Relationship between Hokkien and Mandarin tones ====
There is a reasonably reliable correspondence between Hokkien and Mandarin tones:

- Upper Level: Hokkien 1st tone = Mandarin 1st tone, e.g. 雞 ke/jī.
- Lower Level: Hokkien 5th tone = Mandarin 2nd tone, e.g. 龍 lêng/lóng.
- Rising: Hokkien 2nd tone = Mandarin 3rd tone, e.g. 馬 bée/mǎ.
- Departing: Hokkien 3rd/7th tones = Mandarin 4th tone, e.g. 兔 thòo/tù, 象 tshiōnn/xiàng.

Words with Entering tones all end with ⟨-p⟩, ⟨-t⟩, ⟨-k⟩ or ⟨-h⟩ (glottal stop). As Mandarin no longer has any Entering tones, there is no simple corresponding relationship for the Hokkien 4th and 8th tones, e.g. 國 kok/guó, but 發 huat/fā. The tone in Mandarin often depends on what the initial consonant of the syllable is (see the article on Entering tones for details).

== Literary and colloquial pronunciations ==
Hokkien has not been taught in schools in Penang since the establishment of the Republic of China in 1911, when Mandarin was made the Chinese national language. As such, few if any people have received any formal instruction in Hokkien, and it is not used for literary purposes. However, as in other variants of Min Nan, most words have both literary and colloquial pronunciations. Literary variants are generally eschewed in favour of colloquial pronunciations, e.g. 大學 tuā-o̍h instead of tāi-ha̍k, though literary pronunciations still appear in limited circumstances, e.g.:

- in given names (but generally not surnames), e.g. 安 an rather than uann, 玉 gio̍k rather than ge̍k, 月 gua̍t rather than gue̍h, 明 bêng rather than mêe
- in a few surnames, e.g. 葉 ia̍p rather than hio̍h
- in other proper names, e.g. 龍山堂 Liông-san-tông rather than Lêng-suann-tn̂g
- in certain set phrases, e.g. 差不多 tsha-put-to rather than tshee-m̄-to, 見笑 kiàn-siàu rather than kìnn-tshiò
- in certain names of plants, herbs, and spices, e.g. 木瓜 bo̍k-kua rather than ba̍k-kua, 五香 ngóo-hiong rather than gōo-hiong
- in names of certain professions, eg. 學生 ha̍k-seng instead of o̍h-senn, 醫生 i-seng rather than i-senn, and 老君 ló-kun instead of lāu-kun. A notable exception is 先生 sin-senn

Unlike in China, Taiwan, and the Philippines, the literary pronunciations of numbers higher than two are not used when giving telephone numbers, etc.; e.g. 二五四 jī-gōo-sì instead of jī-ngóo-sù.

== Differences from other varieties of Hokkien ==
Penang Hokkien has differences in pronunciation and vocabulary when compared to other varieties of Hokkien. Although Penang Hokkien has many similarities to Zhangzhou Hokkien from which it is derived, it also has its own unique differences.

- The use of Zhangzhou pronunciations such as 糜 muâi (Amoy: bê), 先生 sin-senn (Amoy: sian-sinn), etc.;
- The use of Zhangzhou expressions such as 調羹 thâu-kiong (Amoy: 湯匙 thng-sî);
- The adoption of pronunciations from Teochew: e.g. 我 wá/uá (Zhangzhou: guá), 糜 môi (Zhangzhou: muâi);
- The adoption of Amoy and Quanzhou pronunciations like 歹勢 pháinn-sè (Zhangzhou: bái/pháinn-sì), 百 pah (Zhangzhou: peeh), etc.

General pronunciation differences can be shown as below:

Penang Hokkien	Amoy Hokkien	Zhangzhou Dialect	Example
8th tone [˦] (4)	8th tone [˦] (4)	8th tone [˩˨] (12)	
-e	-ue	-e	細 sè
-ee	-e	-ee	蝦 hêe
-enn	-inn	-enn	生 senn
-eng	-ing* (/iəŋ/)	-ing* (/iəŋ/)	生 seng
-ek	-ik* (/iək̚/)	-ik* (/iək̚/)	色 sek
-iaunn / -ionn	-iunn	-ionn	想 siāunn
-iong / -iang	-iong	-iang	相 siong
-in	-un	-in	銀 gîn
j-	l-	j-	入 ji̍p
-oo	-ng	-oo	兩 nōo
-u	-i	-i	魚 hû
-ue	-e	-ue	火 hué
-ua	-ue	-ua	話 uā
-uinn	-ng	-uinn	酸 suinn

== Loanwords ==
Due to Penang's linguistic and ethnic diversity, Penang Hokkien is in close contact with many other languages and dialects which are drawn on heavily for loanwords. These include Malay, Teochew, Cantonese and English.

=== Malay ===
Like other dialects in Malaysia and Singapore, Penang Hokkien borrows heavily from Malay, but sometimes to a greater extent than other Hokkien dialects, e.g.:

Penang Hokkien	Malay	Other Hokkien	Definition	Note
ān-ting	anting	耳鉤 hīnn-kau	earring	
bā-lái	balai polis	警察局 kíng-tshat-kio̍k	police station	
bā-lú 峇屢	baru	拄才 tú-tsiah	new(ly), just now	
bān-san 萬山	bangsal	菜市仔 tshài-tshī-á	market	see also: pá-sat (巴剎)
báng-kû	bangku	椅條 í-liâu	stool	
bá-tû 礣砥	batu	石頭 tsio̍h-thâu	stone	
bēr-liân	berlian	璇石 suān-tsio̍h	diamond	
bī-nā-tang	binatang	動物 tōng-bu̍t	animal	禽獸 (khîm-siù) is also frequently used.
gâ-tái 疨㾂	gatal	癢 tsiūnn	itchy	
gēr-lí / gî-lí 疑理	geli	噁 ònn	creepy; hair-raising	
jiám-bân 染蠻	jamban	便所 piān-sóo	toilet	
kan-nang-tsû / kan-lang-tsû 蕳砃薯	kentang	馬鈴薯 má-lîng-tsû	potato	
kau-în / kau-îng 交寅	kahwin	結婚 kiat-hun	marry	
khit-siàn 乞善	kesian	可憐 khó-liân	pity	
lām-peng	lampin	尿帕仔 jiō-phè-á	diaper	
lô-ti 羅知	roti	麵包 mī-pau	bread	
ló-kun 老君	dukun	醫生 i-seng	doctor	
lui 鐳	duit	錢 tsînn	money	
má-ná 嗎哪	mana	當時 tang-sî 啥物時陣 siánn-mih-sî-tsūn	as if; since when?	
mā-nek	manik	珠仔 tsu-á	bead	
má-tâ 馬打	mata-mata	警察 kíng-tshat	police	
pá-sat 巴剎	pasar	菜市仔 tshài-tshī-á	market	see also: bān-san (萬山)
pīng-gang	pinggang	腰 io	waist	
pún 呠 / 僨	pun	也 iā	also	
lā-sa	rasa	感覺 kám-kak	to feel	
sá-bûn 雪文	sabun	茶箍 tê-khoo	soap	Other varieties of Hokkien including some Taiwanese varieties also use 雪文 (sá-bûn)
sâm-pá 儳㞎	sampah	糞埽 pùn-sò	garbage	
sa-yang 捎央	sayang	愛 ài	to love; what a pity	
som-bóng 森妄	sombong	勢利 sè-lī	snobbish	
soo-tong 蘇東	sotong	鰇魚 jiû-hû	squid/cuttlefish	
su-kā / su-kah 私合	suka	愛 ài	to like	
tá-hān 扙捍	tahan	忍耐 lím-nāi	endure	
ta-pí 焦比 / 逐比	tapi	但是 / 毋過 tān-sī / m̄-koh	but	
to-lóng 多琅	tolong	鬥相共 tàu-sann-kāng	help	鬥相共 (tàu-sann-kāng) is also frequently used.
tong-kat 杖楬	tongkat	枴仔 kuái-á	walking stick	
tser-la-kà	celaka	該死 kai-sí	damn it	
tsiám-pó	campur	摻 tsham	to mix	
tua-la 大帤	tuala	面巾 bīn-kin	towel	

There are also many Hokkien words which have been borrowed into Malay, sometimes with slightly different meanings, e.g.:

Malay	Penang Hokkien	Definition	Notes
beca	馬車 bée-tshia	horse-cart	
bihun	米粉 bí-hún	rice vermicelli	
Jepun	日本; Ji̍t-pún	Japan	
loteng	樓頂 lâu-téng	upstairs	Originally means "attic" in Hokkien.
kicap	鮭汁 kê-tsiap	fish sauce	Originally means "sauce" in Hokkien.
kongsi	公司 kong-si	to share	Originally means "company/firm/clan association" in Hokkien.
kuaci	瓜子 kua-tsí	edible watermelon seeds	
kuetiau	粿條 kué-tiâu	flat rice noodle	
kuih	粿 kué	rice-flour cake	
mi	麵 mī	noodles	
sinseh	先生 sin-senn	traditional Chinese doctor	
tauhu	豆腐 taū-hū	tofu	
tauke	頭家 thâu-kee	boss	
teh	茶 têe	tea	
teko	茶鈷 têe-kóo	teapot	
Tionghua / Tionghoa	中華; Tiong-huâ	Chinese (of/relating to China)	
Tiongkok	中國; Tiong-kok	China	
tukang	廚工 tû-kang	craftsman	

=== Other Chinese varieties ===
There are words in Penang Hokkien that originated from other varieties of Chinese spoken in and around Malaysia. e.g.:

Penang Hokkien	Originated from	Definition	Note
愛 ài	Teochew	want	Other varieties of Hokkien use 欲 beh.
我 wá	Teochew	I; me	Originally pronounced as guá in Hokkien, however Penang Hokkien has adopted the Teochew pronunciation.
我儂 wá-lâng	Teochew	we; us	May be shortened to wang/uang (卬). Other varieties of Hokkien use 阮 gún/guán.
汝儂 lú-lâng	Teochew	you guys	May be shortened to luang (戎). Other varieties of Hokkien use 恁 lín.
伊儂 i-lâng	Teochew	they; theirs	May be shortened to yang/iang (傇). Other varieties of Hokkien use 𪜶 (亻因) in.
無變 bô-piàn	Teochew	nothing can be done	
豬母酸 / 豬母霜 tu-bó-suinn / tu-bó-sng	Teochew	octopus (particularly as food)	From local Teochew 豬母酸 tṳ-bó-sṳng.
啱 ngam	Cantonese	fit; suitable	
大佬 tāi-lôu	Cantonese	bro; boss	Penang Hokkien uses pronunciation from Cantonese.
緊張 kán-tsiong / kín-tsiong	Cantonese	nervous	From the Cantonese pronunciation 緊張 gán jēung, or a compound of Hokkien 緊 (kín) + Cantonese 張 (jēung). The original Hokkien pronunciation would be kín-tiaunn/kín-tionn.
無釐頭 môu-lêi-thāu	Cantonese	makes no sense	From Cantonese 無厘頭 mòuh lèih tàuh.
豬腸粉 tsý-tshiông-fân	Cantonese	chee cheong fun	Penang Hokkien uses pronunciation from Cantonese.
雲吞 uān-than	Cantonese	wantan	Penang Hokkien uses pronunciation from Cantonese.
濕濕碎 sa̋p-sa̋p-sêoi	Cantonese	easy; "a piece of cake"	Penang Hokkien uses pronunciation from Cantonese.
死父 sí-pēe	Singaporean Hokkien	very	Originated from Teochew 死父 sí-pĕ and adopted from Singaporean Hokkien 死爸 sí-pē.
我老兮 wá-lāu-ê	Singaporean Hokkien	oh my god; oh no	

=== English ===
Penang Hokkien has also borrowed some words from English, some of which may have been borrowed via Malay. Often, these words tend to be more technical and less well embedded than the Malay words, e.g. brake, park, pipe, pump, etc. However some are used in common everyday language, e.g.:

Penang Hokkien	English	Other Hokkien	Note
a-bôi 阿bôi	Boy	囝 kiánn	Familiar term of address for one's own son. Also used generally to refer to someone else's son or younger male around one's son's age.
a-gêr 阿gêr	Girl	查某囝 tsa-bóo-kiánn	Familiar term of address for one's own daughter. Also used generally to refer to someone else's daughter or younger female around one's daughter's age.
áng-kér 安哥	Uncle	阿叔 a-tsek	Familiar term of address for a man around one's father's age. Also used generally to refer to any middle-aged or older man.
án-tí 安娣	Aunty	阿姨 a-î	Familiar term of address for a woman around one's mother's age. Also used generally to refer to any middle-aged or older woman.
kú-shérn 古申	cushion	墊 tiām	
lée-liô 黎撩	radio	收音機 siu-im-ki	
móo-tó 摩哆	motorcycle	摩托車 môo-thok-tshia	Derives from 'motor' in 'motorcycle'.
sée-le̋rt 沙律	salad	沙拉 sa-la	
sóo-fá 沙發	sofa	膨椅 phòng-í	

=== Thai ===
Penang Hokkien also contains words which are thought to come from Thai, e.g.:

Penang Hokkien	Definition	Other Hokkien	Note
pua̍t 鈸 / 鏺	1/10 of a unit of currency i.e. 10 sen / cents e.g. 50 sen 五鈸 gōo-pua̍t	角 kak	Etymology ultimately unknown but thought to come from Thai baht.

== Entertainment ==
In recent years, a number of movies that incorporate the use of Penang Hokkien have been filmed, as part of wider efforts to preserve the language's relevance. Among the more recent movies are The Journey, which became the highest-grossing Malaysian film in 2014, and You Mean the World to Me, the first movie to be filmed entirely in Penang Hokkien.

Another contribution to the entertainment landscape is the Penang Hokkien Podcast. As an initiative in the realm of Penang Hokkien entertainment, the Penang Hokkien Podcast complements the efforts to preserve the language's relevance. It serves as an audio medium that celebrates the culture, and humour associated with Penang Hokkien.

In the Doctor Who series, the first language to be used other than English was Hokkien. This occurred in a dialogue translated by the Penang-born actress Pik-Sen Lim, in The Mind of Evil serial (1971). Lim also used Penang Hokkien in the British sitcom Mind Your Language (1977–79), when portraying the character Chung Su-Lee, a Chinese national.

== Speak Hokkien Campaign ==
The Speak Hokkien Campaign is a social movement aimed at the revitalisation and promotion of the Hokkien language, with a particular focus on preserving its use among Hokkien-speaking communities worldwide. Launched online on 12 Jul 2015, the campaign began as a grassroots initiative on Facebook by Hokkien speakers from Penang, Malaysia, and has since grown into an active platform for spreading awareness and fostering pride in the language.

While its roots lie in Penang Hokkien, the campaign also shares information about other variants of Hokkien spoken in regions such as Singapore, the Philippines, Indonesia, Taiwan, and beyond, emphasising the language’s diversity and cultural richness.

The campaign contrasts with Singapore’s government-led Speak Mandarin Campaign, advocating instead for the preservation and use of Hokkien. The Facebook page is operated by members of the Persatuan Bahasa Hokkien Pulau Pinang (Hokkien Language Association of Penang), a non-governmental organisation officially established in 2014 to safeguard the linguistic and cultural heritage of Penang Hokkien. Through its online presence, the Speak Hokkien Campaign plays a crucial role in uniting Hokkien-speaking communities globally and inspiring a renewed appreciation for the language.

== See also ==
- Hokkien architecture
- Hokkien culture
- Hokkien media
- Hoklo people
- Lan-nang-oe (Philippine Hokkien)
- Medan Hokkien
- Place and street names of Penang
- Singaporean Hokkien
- Southern Malaysia Hokkien
- Taiwanese Hokkien
- Written Hokkien
