= Speak Hokkien Campaign =

Language preservation movement

Speak Hokkien Campaign (simplified Chinese: 讲福建话运动; traditional Chinese: 講福建話運動; Pe̍h-ōe-jī: Kóng Hok-kiàn-ōa Ūn-tōng) is a social movement dedicated to the language revitalization of the Hokkien language. The campaign was launched online by some Hokkien speakers from Penang, Malaysia, and is committed to maintaining and expanding the use of Hokkien. The name was chosen to contrast with the Speak Mandarin Campaign, which is a Singaporean government program meant to encourage Chinese Singaporeans to speak Mandarin instead of Hokkien.

== See also ==
- Hoklo people
- Hokkien culture
- Hokkien architecture
- Written Hokkien
- Hokkien media
- Southern Malaysia Hokkien
- Penang Hokkien
- Taiwanese Hokkien
- Medan Hokkien
- Singaporean Hokkien
- Amoy dialect
- Lan-nang-ue (Philippine dialect of Hokkien)
- Protection of the Varieties of Chinese
- Universal Declaration of Linguistic Rights
