= Southern Peninsular Malaysian Hokkien =

Dialect of Hokkien spoken in parts of Malaysia

Southern Malaysia Hokkien
- 南马福建话; Lâm-Má Hok-kiàn-ōe (POJ)
- Native to: Southern Malaysia
- Region: Johor, Malacca, Coastal Selangor
- Language family: Sino-Tibetan: Sinitic; Chinese; Min; Coastal Min; Southern Min; Hokkien; Quanzhou; Southern Malaysia Hokkien
- Early forms: Proto-Sino-Tibetan: Old Chinese (Note: Min is believed to have split from Old Chinese, rather than Middle Chinese like other varieties of Chinese.); Proto-Min
- Dialects: Melaka Hokkien; Klang Hokkien; Johor Hokkien

Language codes
- ISO 639-3: nan for Southern Min / Min Nan which encompasses a variety of Hokkien dialects including "in Malaysia, most notably in and around Kuching, Muar, Klang".
- Glottolog: None
- Linguasphere: 79-AAA-jek

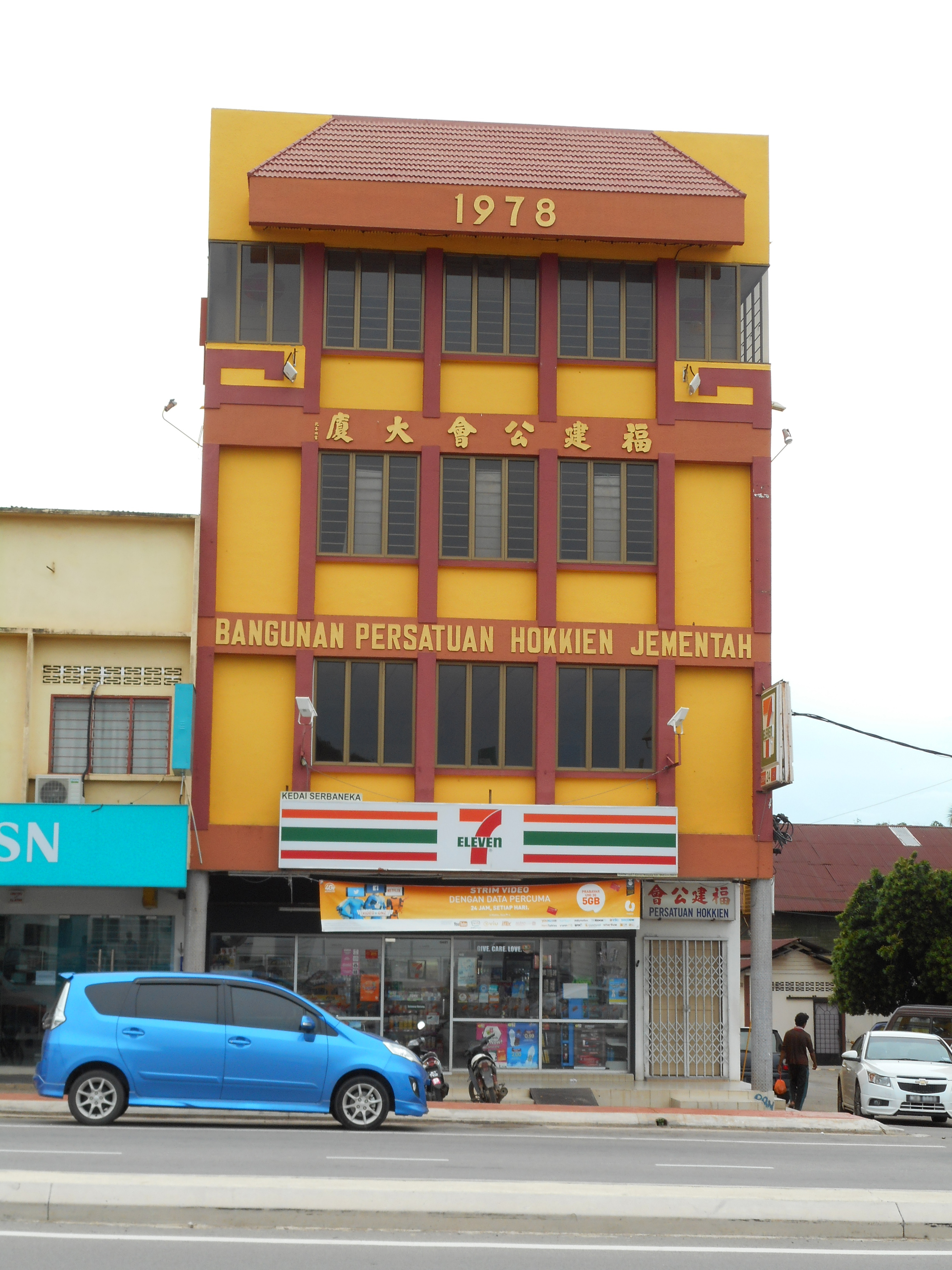
Jementah Hokkien Association in Jementah, Segamat, Johor.

Southern Malaysian Hokkien (simplified Chinese: 南马福建话; traditional Chinese: 南馬福建話; pinyin: Nán Mǎ Fújiànhuà; Pe̍h-ōe-jī: Lâm-Má Hok-kiàn-oē) is a local variant of the Min Nan Chinese variety spoken in Central and Southern Peninsular Malaysia (Klang, Melaka, Muar, Tangkak, Segamat, Batu Pahat, Pontian and Johor Bahru). Due to geographical proximity, it is heavily influenced by Singaporean Hokkien.

This dialect is based on Quanzhou-accented varieties of Min Nan, including the Eng Choon (Yongchun) dialect. It is markedly distinct from Penang Hokkien and Medan Hokkien, which are based on the Zhangzhou dialects.

Similar to the situation in Singapore, the term Hokkien is generally used by the Chinese in South-east Asia to refer to Min Nan Chinese (闽南语). Southern Malaysian Hokkien is based on the Quanzhou dialects with some influence from the Amoy dialect. The dialect also contains loan words from Malay.

== Phonology ==
This section is based on Eng Choon (Yongchun) Hokkien spoken in Melaka.

=== Vowels ===
There are eight phonemic vowels:

	Front	Central	Back
Close	i	ɨ	u
Close-mid	e		o
Mid		ə̠	
Open-mid			ɔ
Open	a		

=== Tones ===
There are seven tones, five of which are long tones and two are checked tones. Like other varieties of Hokkien, these tones also undergo tone sandhi in non-final positions. The tone values (both base tones and sandhi tones) of the long tones are shown below:

Tone number	Final/base tone	Non-final/sandhi tone
1	˧ (33)	˧ (33)
2	˨˧ (23)	˨˩ (21)
3	˥˨ (52)	˧˦ (34)
5	˨˩ (21)	˥˧ (53)
6	˨˩ (21)	˨˩ (21)

== Influences from other languages ==
Southern Malaysian Hokkien is also subjected to influence from various languages or dialects spoken in Malaysia. This is influenced to a certain degree by the Teochew dialect and is sometimes being regarded to be a combined Hokkien–Teochew speech (especially in Muar, Batu Pahat, Pontian and Johor Bahru).

There are some loanwords from Malay, but they are fewer in number than in Penang Hokkien and do not completely replace the original words in Hokkien. For example, unlike Penang Hokkien that has loanwords for "rock" that is borrowed from Malay's "batu", Southern Malaysian Hokkien uses Chinese word 石頭 (chioh-thau) for "rock". Southern Malaysian Hokkien also has loanwords from English.

== See also ==
- Hoklo people
- Hokkien culture
- Hokkien architecture
- Written Hokkien
- Hokkien media
- Penang Hokkien
- Singaporean Hokkien
- Taiwanese Hokkien
- Medan Hokkien
- Philippine Hokkien
- Amoy dialect
- Speak Hokkien Campaign
- Holopedia
- Chinese in Malaysia
- Chinese in Singapore
- Chinese in Indonesia
- Chinese in Philippines

== Sources ==
- Chang, Yueh-chin; Hsieh, Feng-fan (2012). "Tonal coarticulation in Malaysian Hokkien: A typological anomaly?". The Linguistic Review. 29 (1): 37–73. doi:10.1515/tlr-2012-0003.
- Huang, Ting; Chang, Yueh-chin; Hsieh, Feng-fan (17–21 August 2011). An Acoustic Analysis of Central Vowels in Malaysian Hokkien (PDF). 17th International Congress of Phonetic Sciences. Hong Kong. pp. 914–917.
- Tan, Chee Beng (2001). "Chinese in Southeast Asia and Identities in Changing Global Context". In Armstrong, M. Jocelyn; Armstrong, R. Warwick; Mulliner, Kent (eds.). Chinese Populations in Contemporary Southeast Asian Societies: Identities, Interdependence and International Influence. London and New York: Routledge. pp. 210–236. ISBN 0-7007-1398-0.
