= Funscreen Weekly =

Taiwanese online newspaper

- Official logo
- Type: Film criticism
- Owners: National Central University Film Studies Center; Taiwan Film and Audiovisual Institute
- Founder: Lin Wen-chi
- Editor-in-chief: Tsai Hsiao-sung
- Founded: 2005
- Language: Traditional Chinese
- Country: Taiwan
- Website: https://funscreen.tfai.org.tw/

Funscreen Weekly (Chinese: 放映週報) is a Taiwanese online newspaper that provides news, reviews, and interviews about films. Originally founded as Funscreen Biweekly in 2005 as a student publication for National Central University, it later became a non-profit online newspaper co-owned by the Taiwan Film and Audiovisual Institute. Funscreen Weekly is the first online publication and one of only two currently operating media outlets in Taiwan that focuses on providing film reviews, and it received the Outstanding Contribution Award in the 14th Taipei Film Awards.

== History ==
In 1993, Lin Wen-chi (林文淇), a doctorate graduate in literature, was offered a professorship in the Department of English at National Central University (NCU), introducing film studies courses to the university and beginning his career as a film scholar. In the following years, Lin wrote film reviews for various newspapers and magazines, but only occasionally and by invitation. In 2004, NCU established the Cimage Taiwan Film Company (中映電影公司) to support the entrepreneurial efforts of its graduates in the film industry, and in 2005, Cimage began publishing a film-themed newspaper titled Funscreen Biweekly (放映雙週報), which operated as a school publication. It was named Funscreen in English because its Chinese name "放映" is pronounced similarly to "Fun". The first issue was published in January 2005, featuring Hou Hsiao-hsien's Café Lumière as its cover story. Lin served as the guiding teacher, and contributing writers volunteered their work without compensation. The Reporter referred to 2005 as a low point for the Taiwanese film industry, noting that mainstream media seldom covered domestic films, and acknowledged Funscreen for "providing valuable documentary information about that period". Lin cited inspiration from film director Tsai Ming-liang's film promotion efforts at university campuses for founding the newspaper, and he later served as its chief editor.

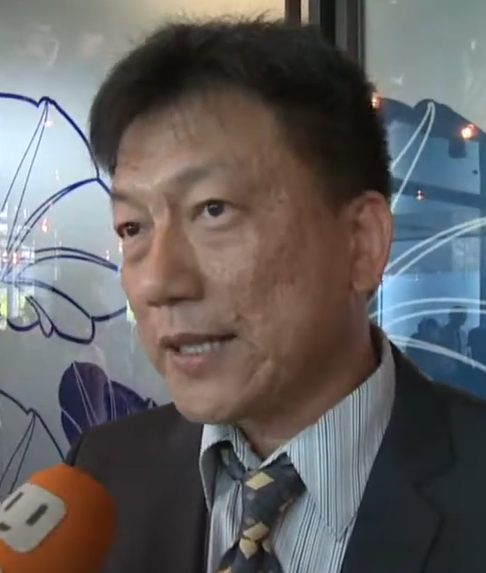
Lin Wen-chi, the founder of Funscreen Weekly.

Due to a lack of operating funds, the newspaper was initially set to cease publication after a year and a half, but it was taken over by NCU's Film Studies Center, continuing as a non-profit publication funded by the Government Information Office. It shifted to a weekly publication schedule and changed its title to Funscreen Weekly. The newspaper became the first online publication in Taiwan focusing on the Taiwanese film industry, offering film reviews, interviews, film news, and commentaries with an emphasis on filmmaking and film aesthetics. In 2011, it conducted a survey among filmmakers and critics to vote on the best ten Taiwanese films of the past decade. In 2012, Lin Wen-chi became the director of the Chinese Taipei Film Archive, where he brought Funscreen under the institution's management to alleviate its financial difficulties. As of 2012, the newspaper had approximately 40,000 subscribers, with all writers being NCU students and no full-time writers on staff. That same year, Funscreen Weekly received the Outstanding Contribution Award in the 14th Taipei Film Awards, becoming the first and only non-individual recipient of the award until the Taipei Documentary Filmmakers' Union won in the same category in the 18th Taipei Film Awards in 2016.

In mid-autumn 2014, a collection of film reviews and critiques titled Funscreen on Paper (紙上放映) was released, edited by Shinie Wang, a Funscreen writer who joined the publication since January 2009. In 2020, the Chinese Taipei Film Archive was restructured and renamed the Taiwan Film and Audiovisual Institute (TFAI), while Funscreen continued to operate under the institute. As of November 2024, Funscreen Weekly remains one of only two active media outlets which primarily focuses on providing film reviews in Taiwan, alongside a printed publication Film Appreciation Journal, with both publications currently co-owned and published by the TFAI. In 2025, it won the Special Contribution Award in the 6th Taiwan Film Critics Society Awards.

== Reception ==
Film critic Bae Dongmi said that when "discussing 21st-century Taiwanese and Asian cinema, one cannot pass through Funscreen Weekly". Scholar Ama H. Vanniarachchy wrote that Funscreen "focus[es] entirely on film reviews and discussions, giving space for deeper reflection and debate", and that it "do[es] not exist to flatter friends or promote stars", but rather "to analyse and educate — and in the process, they help audiences become more discerning".

Film critic Hsieh Chia-chin, however, found that the magazine was "somewhat burdened" by "its mission to support local cinema and engage in dialogue with Taiwanese filmmakers and scholars, making it less useful as a reference for general audiences, and less inclined to discuss foreign films".

== Awards and nominations ==
Year	Award	Category	Nominee	Result	Ref.
2012	14th Taipei Film Awards	Outstanding Contribution Award	—N/a	Won	
2025	6th Taiwan Film Critics Society Awards	Special Contribution Award	—N/a	Won	
