= National Film Archive =

The National Film Archive may refer to:

- BFI National Archive, which was called the National Film Archive between 1955 and 1992
- National Film Archive of India, a division of the Indian Ministry of Information and Broadcasting
- National Film Archive of Japan, an independent administrative institution and museum
- National Film Archive – Audiovisual Institute, Poland
- Taiwan Film and Audiovisual Institute, known as the National Film Archive from 1989 to 1995
