= Taiwan Film and Audiovisual Institute =

Organization in Taipei, Taiwan

Coordinates: 25°02′38.1″N 121°31′20.6″E

Taiwan Film and Audiovisual Institute 國家電影及視聽文化中心
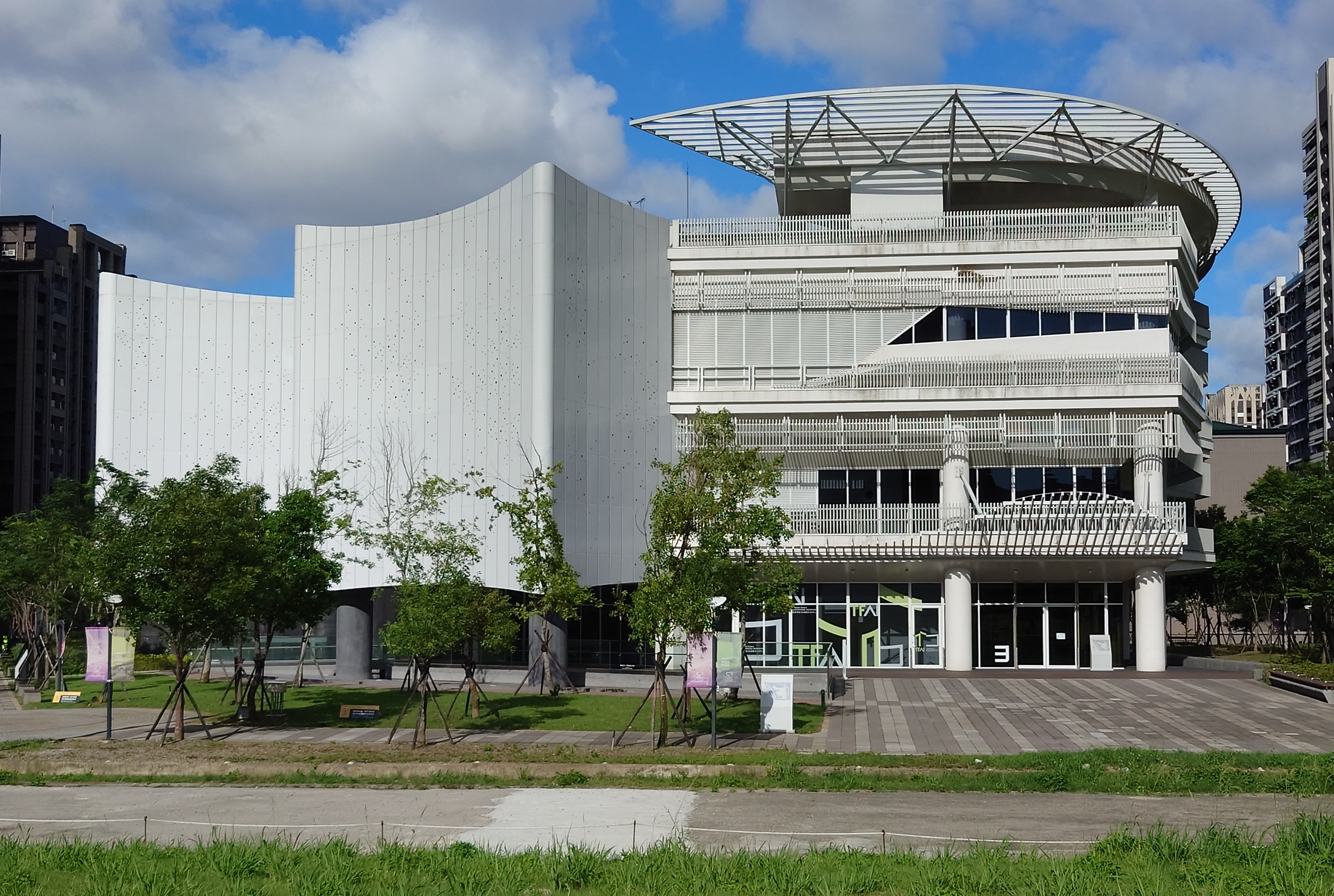
- Established: 19 January 1979 (as the Film Library of the Motion Picture Development Foundation)
- Mission: Film preservation and restoration
- Chair: Arthur Chu
- Executive director: Du Li-chin
- Budget: NT$170 million p.a.
- Formerly called: Film Library of the Motion Picture Development Foundation; National Film Archive; Chinese Taipei Film Archive; Taiwan Film Institute
- Location: Xinzhuang, New Taipei City, Taiwan
- Website: tfai.org.tw

The Taiwan Film and Audiovisual Institute (TFAI; traditional Chinese: 國家電影及視聽文化中心; simplified Chinese: 国家电影及视听文化中心; pinyin: Guójiā Diànyǐng Jí Shìtīng Wénhuà Zhōngxīn; lit. 'National Film and Audiovisual Culture Center'), formerly Taiwan Film Institute (TFI; traditional Chinese: 國家電影中心; simplified Chinese: 国家电影中心; pinyin: Guójiā Diànyǐng Zhōngxīn; lit. 'National Film Center'), is a foundation in Zhongzheng District, Taipei, Taiwan, that aims to preserve Taiwanese and Mandarin films. At its establishment in 1979, the foundation was known as the Film Library of the Motion Picture Development Foundation. It became the National Film Archive in 1989, and the Chinese Taipei Film Archive later.

== History ==
Plans for a national film archive were first proposed in 1967 by the Cultural Bureau of the Ministry of Education. Two years later, drafting of the Film Archive Establishment Act began. However, the Cultural Bureau was shut down in 1973, and the film archive project was placed on hold. Oversight of Taiwanese cinema was delegated to the Government Information Office (GIO). The Motion Picture Development Foundation, which had been established in 1975 with help from the GIO and the Taipei Film Business Association, announced in 1978 that a film library would be funded via the GIO. The Film Library of the Motion Picture Development Foundation opened on 19 January 1979.

The film library later became responsible for hosting the Golden Horse Awards ceremony. It was renamed the National Film Archive in 1989, shortly before its founding director Hsu Li-kong left his post. Hsu's successor Ray Jing ended the archive's involvement with the Golden Horse Awards. Additionally, the name change brought with it a new mission. Jing began compiling old Taiwanese Hokkien films and other artifacts of the Taiwanese film industry, choosing to set aside the cultural education of the public. In 1991, the National Film Archive split from the Motion Picture Development Foundation, and was placed under the purview of the National Film Archive Foundation shortly thereafter. The foundation itself answered to the Department of Motion Picture Affairs, a division of the Government Information Office. The National Film Archive sought membership in the International Federation of Film Archives in 1992. Membership was granted in 1995, after the archive became the Chinese Taipei Film Archive.

On 28 July 2014, the Ministry of Culture replaced the Chinese Taipei Film Archive with the Taiwan Film Institute. The TFI was launched in a ceremony attended by culture minister Lung Ying-tai and New Taipei Mayor Eric Chu. On 26 December 2016, the institute launched an online box office, an attempt to increase the transparency of the Taiwanese film industry. In July 2017, it launched its film restoration laboratory.

The Legislative Yuan passed a bill in December 2019, upgrading the Taiwan Film Institute from an incorporated foundation to an administrative public body. The legislation took effect on 19 May 2020 and the organization was renamed to the Taiwan Film and Audiovisual Institute.

== Film preservation ==
A selection of Hokkien films were curated by Chang Yann and Alfonso Li for the 25th Golden Horse Awards in 1988 at the direction of Hsu Li-kong. Attempts to preserve Hokkien films began under Ray Jing's leadership of the National Film Archive. In 2013, the Chinese Taipei Film Archive began the Taiwan Cinema Digital Restoration Project. The Taiwan Film and Audiovisual Institute holds within its collection all of the surviving Hokkien-language films produced between 1956 and 1961. Although 1,000 Hokkien-language films were produced between 1956 and 1981, and 1,500 to 2,000 were created in total, roughly 160 complete films survive, due to the political censorship of the White Terror period, which also heavily affected Hokkien pop. By 2026, TFAI restored its 100th Hokkien film.

From 1989 to 2022, the Taiwan Film and Audiovisual Institute collected over 18,000 Taiwanese films. As of 2022, this film collection was stored in Shulin District, New Taipei. There are plans for a film museum, with more space dedicated to film storage.

== Organizational structures ==
- Department of Administration
- Department of Acquisition and Preservation
- Department of Education and Public Services
- Department of Research and Development
- Department of Documentary
- Department of International Promotion
- Department of Digital Restoration
- Office of Accounting

== Events ==
The film institute also holds film preservation with other institute outside Taiwan. It regularly holds movie screenings and exhibitions on films, as well as film compilation. It also invites renowned move experts to teach at the institute. The institute has also been promoting movies to elementary and secondary schools in Taiwan.

== Transportation ==
The organization is accessible within walking distance south of Shandao Temple Station of Taipei Metro.
