= Hokkien architecture =

Architectural style of the Hoklo people

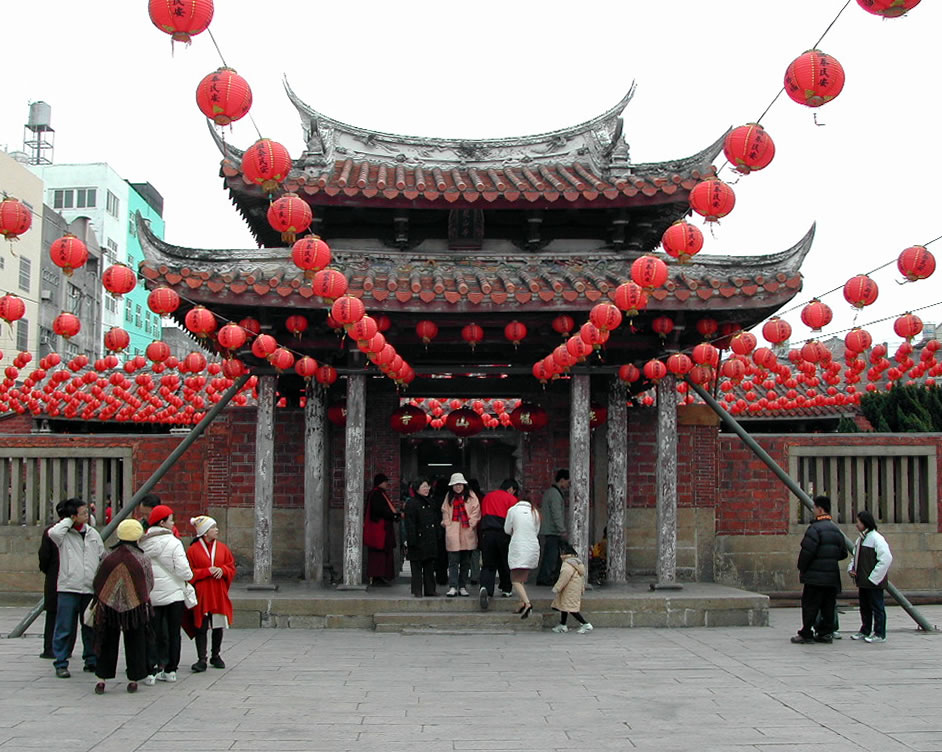
Hoklo architecture styled Lukang Longshan Temple.

Hokkien architecture, also called Hoklo architecture or Minnan architecture, refers to the architectural style of the Hoklo people, a Han Chinese sub-group who have historically been the dominant demographic of the Southern Chinese province of Fujian (called "Hokkien" in the Hoklo language), and Taiwan, Singapore. This style shares many similarities with those of surrounding Han Chinese groups. There are, however, several features that are unique or mostly unique to Hoklo-made buildings, making many traditional buildings in Hokkien and Taiwan visually distinctive from those outside the region.

== Minyue architecture ==
Prior to the annexation of the Minyue Kingdom by the Han dynasty, the region was inhabited by the Minyue people, a branch of the Baiyue aboriginals. The Minyue State's Imperial City (Traditional Chinese: 閩越王城遺址) gave some clues about what their architectural style was like.

== Swallowtail roof ==
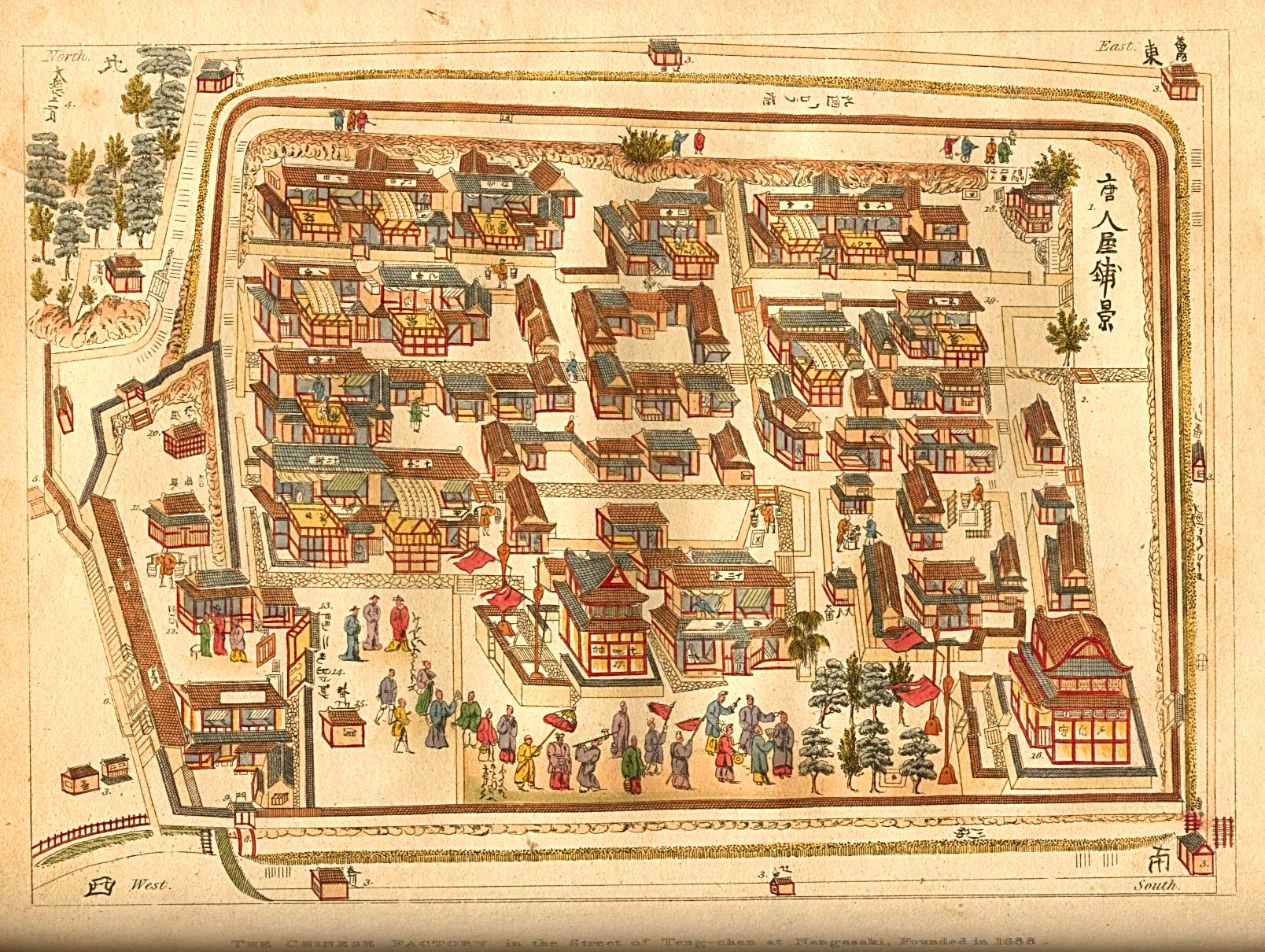
Hokkien community (Chinese:唐人屋敷) doing business at Nagasaki in the second half of the 18th century

Swallowtail roof (Pe̍h-ōe-jī: ìnn-bé-tsiah; Traditional Chinese: 燕尾脊, literally "swallowtail ridge") is a feature rarely (if at all) seen in non-Hoklo Han Chinese architecture. It is very common in Hokkien and Taiwan. The term refers to a roof that has an upward-curving ridge shaped like the tail of a swallow. The degree of curving may vary. The "swallowtail" in question can be single- or double-layered and is typically decorated with a large amount of colorful carvings. This feature originated in 16th century (Ming Dynasty). At that time, Hoklo people were doing business with Southeast Asia, Taiwan, Ryukyu (Ryūkyū-kan) and Japan, and decided that they would like to show off their newfound wealth - resulting in this bright and elaborate architectural style. Due to its bright and showy nature, this architectural feature is commonly found in major temples, mansions, and ancestral halls.

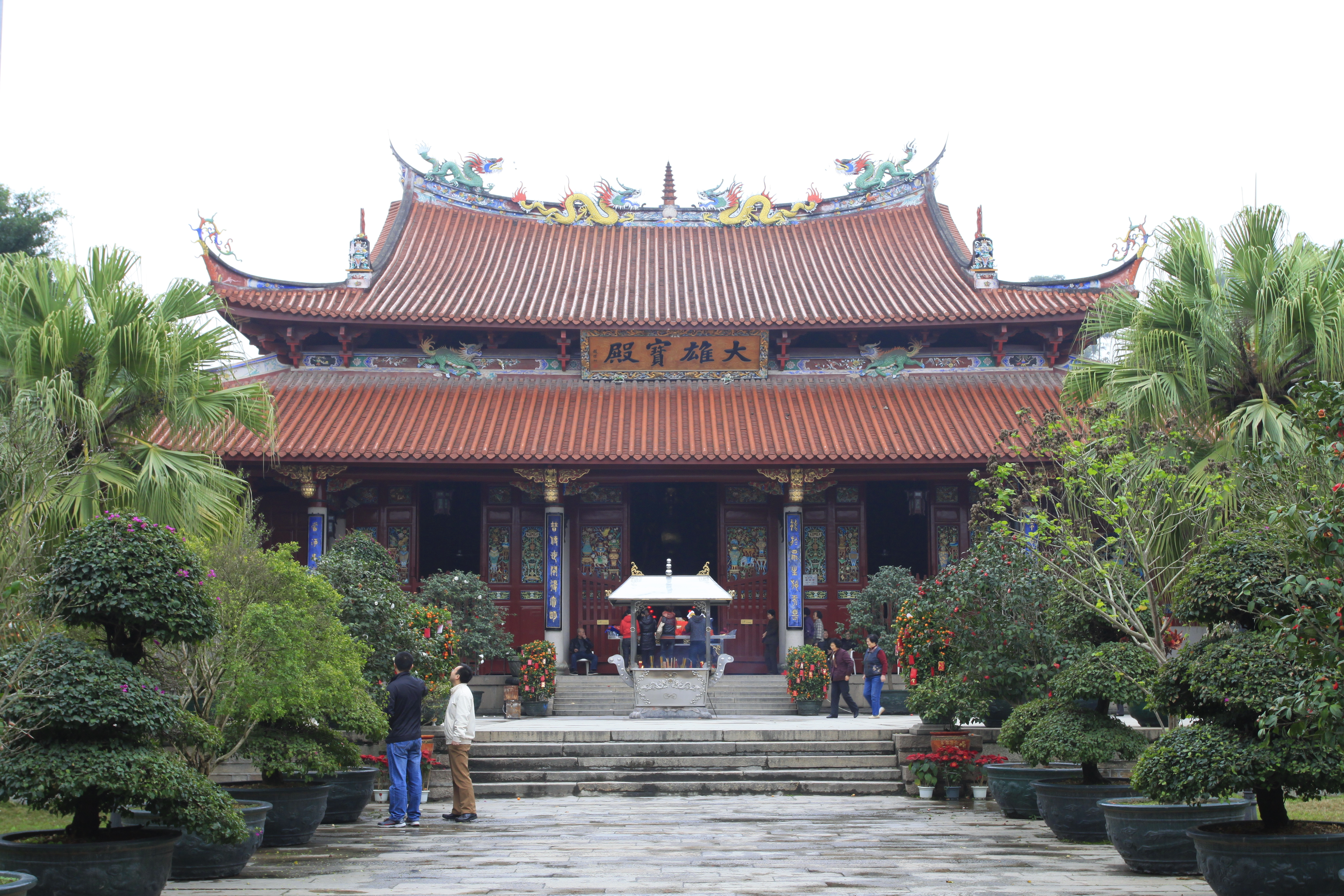
Mahavira Hall of Nanshan Temple, Zhangzhou, Fujian.

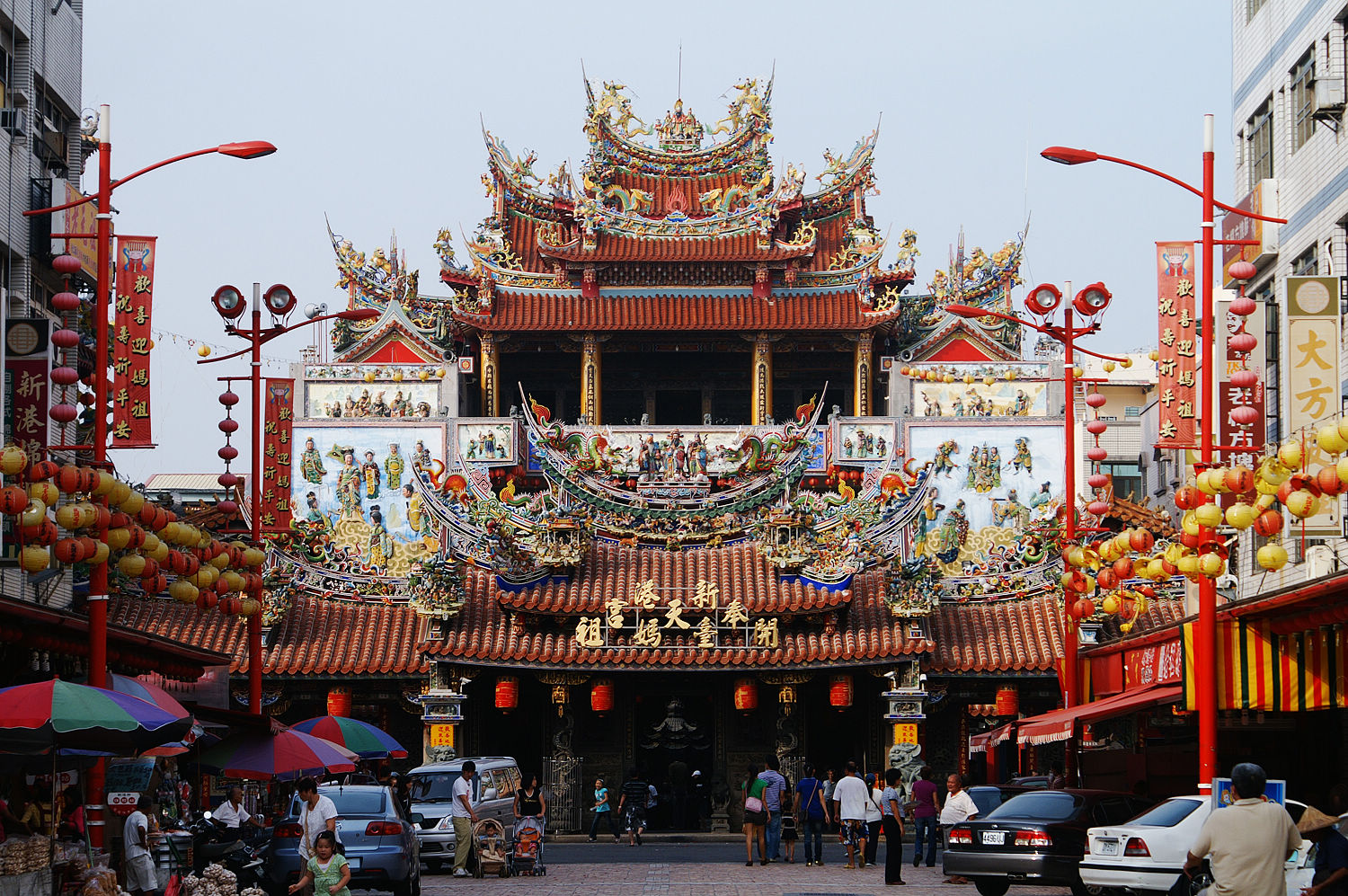
Fengtian Temple, a prominent Mazu temple in Chiayi City, Taiwan.

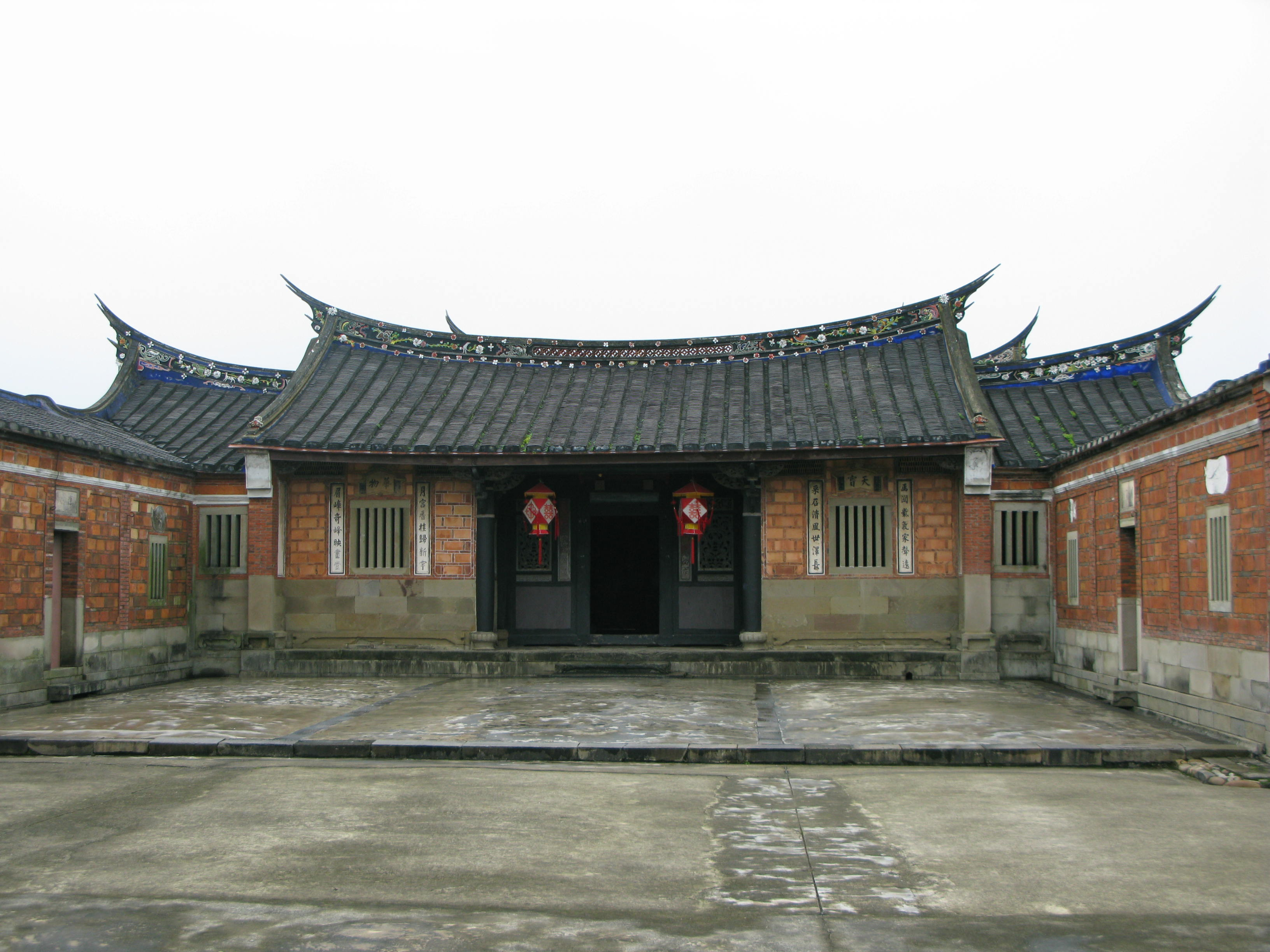
Lee Teng-fan's Ancient Residence, Taoyuan. Many Hakka clans in Taiwan adopted Minnan architecture.

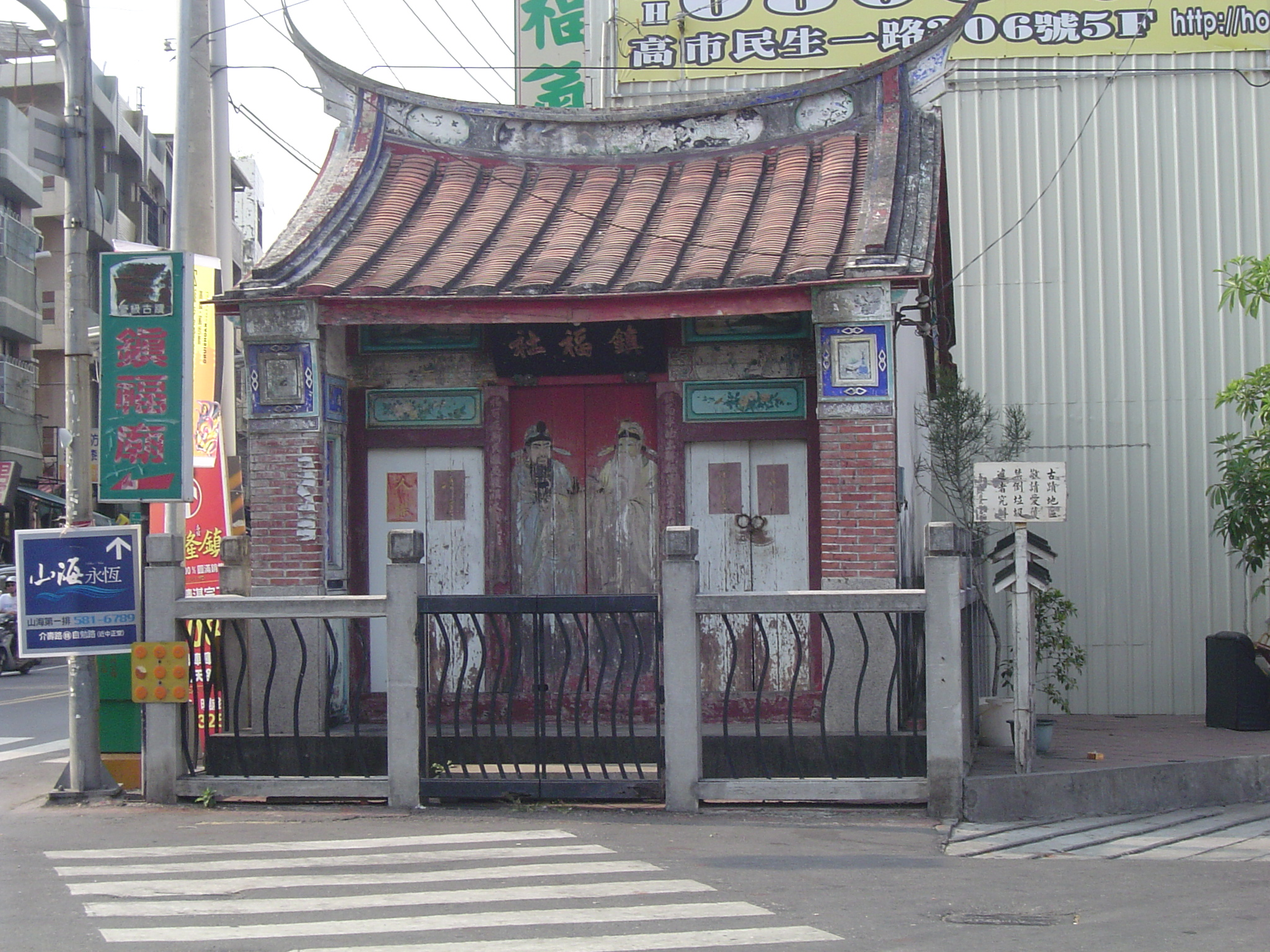
A shrine dedicated to Tudigong, a Chinese Earth Deity, in Kaohsiung, Taiwan; It is an example of a less garish swallowtail roof.

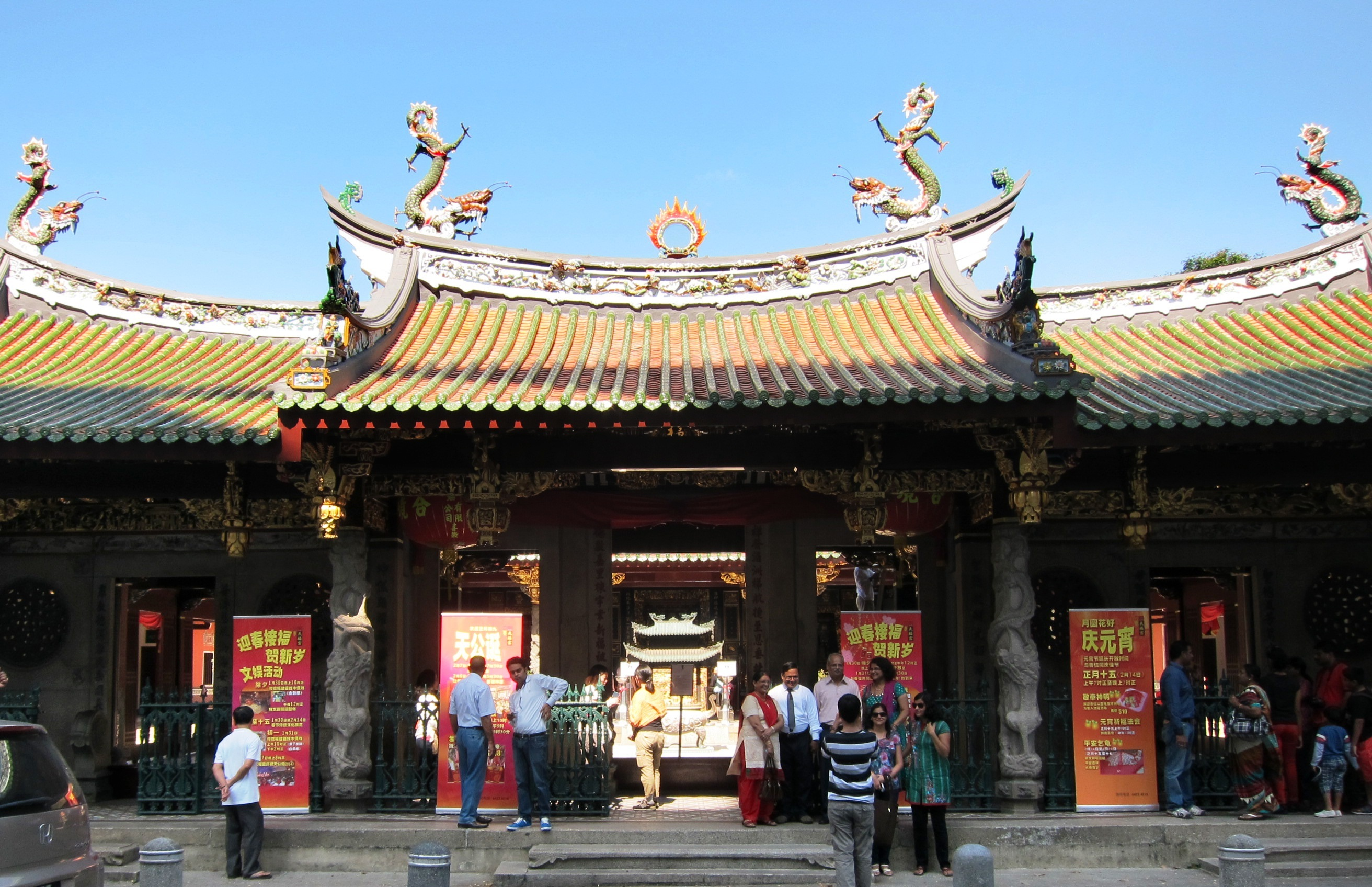
Thian Hock Keng Temple, dedicated to Mazu, one of the oldest Hokkien temple in Singapore.

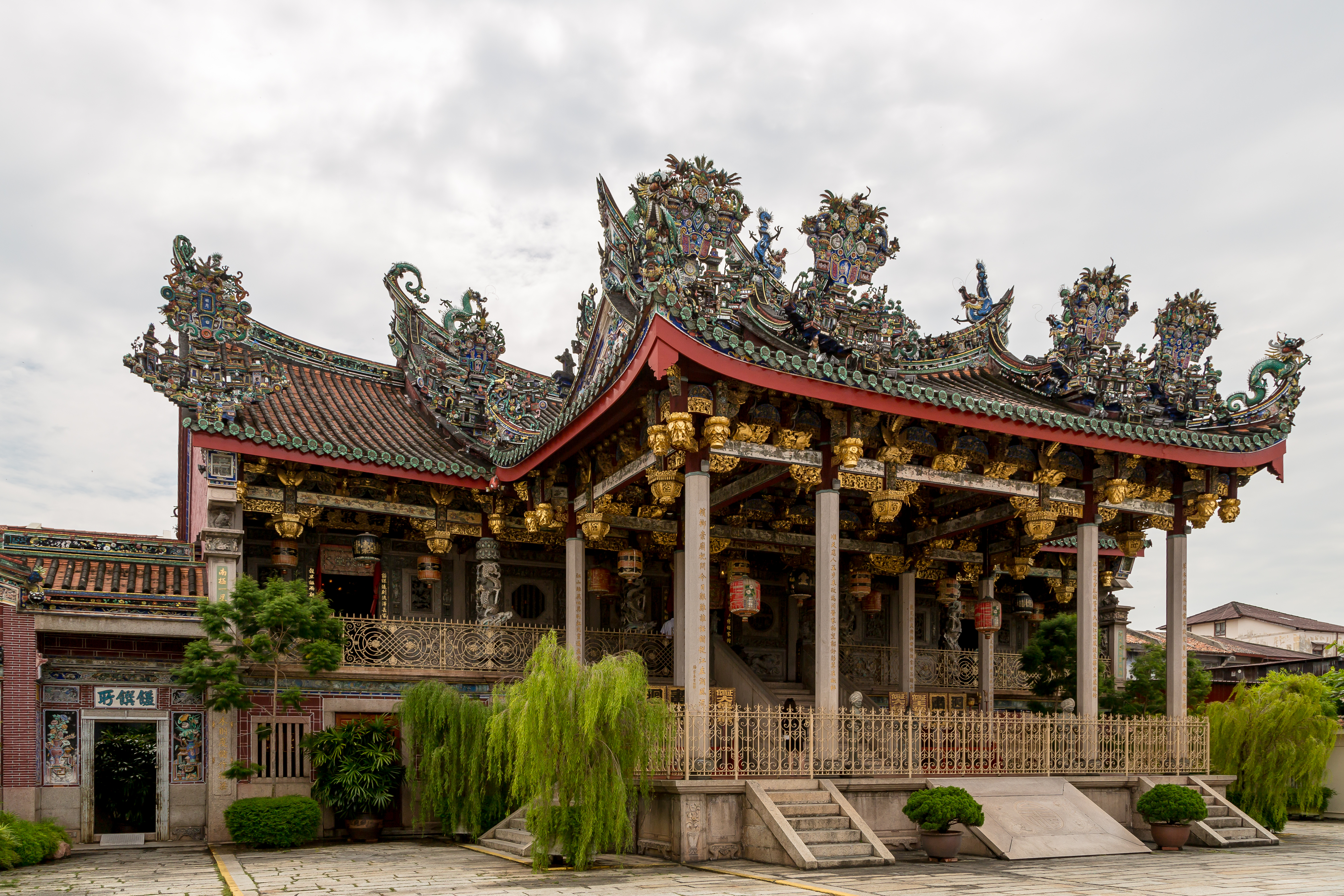
Leong San Tong Khoo Kongsi is located Penang, Malaysia and is the country's largest Hokkien clanhouse.

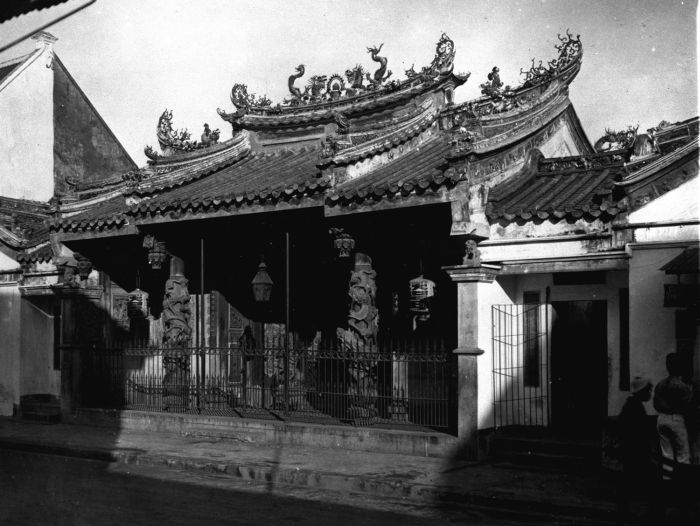
Historical image of a Mazu Temple in Makassar, Sulawesi, Indonesia. The building was burned in 1997 during anti-Chinese riot in the city. The temple was being rebuilt and renamed as Vihara Ibu Agung Bahari.

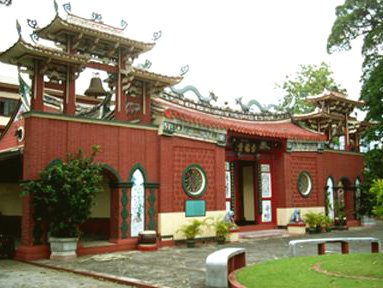
Chong Hock Tong Temple at the Manila Chinese Cemetery in Manila, Philippines

== Cut porcelain carving ==
Cut porcelain carving (Pe̍h-ōe-jī: Tsián-huî-tiau; Traditional Chinese: 剪瓷雕, literally "cut porcelain carving") is also prevalent among Hoklo architecture and, to a lesser extent, Vietnamese architecture. Traditionally, Hoklo porcelain artists would often gather small colored porcelain artifacts (such as bowls and other eating utensils), cut and/or grind them into smaller fragments, and then paste these fragments onto sculptures attached to buildings for the purpose of decoration. This art is frequently used on the ridges, window frames, and doors of temples and larger residences, often in conjunction with swallowtail roof. The topic of these sculptures may vary - ranging from plants and animals to figures from Chinese mythology or Hoklo folktales. In Taiwan, a new style has even been formed by combining cut porcelain carving with cochin ware.

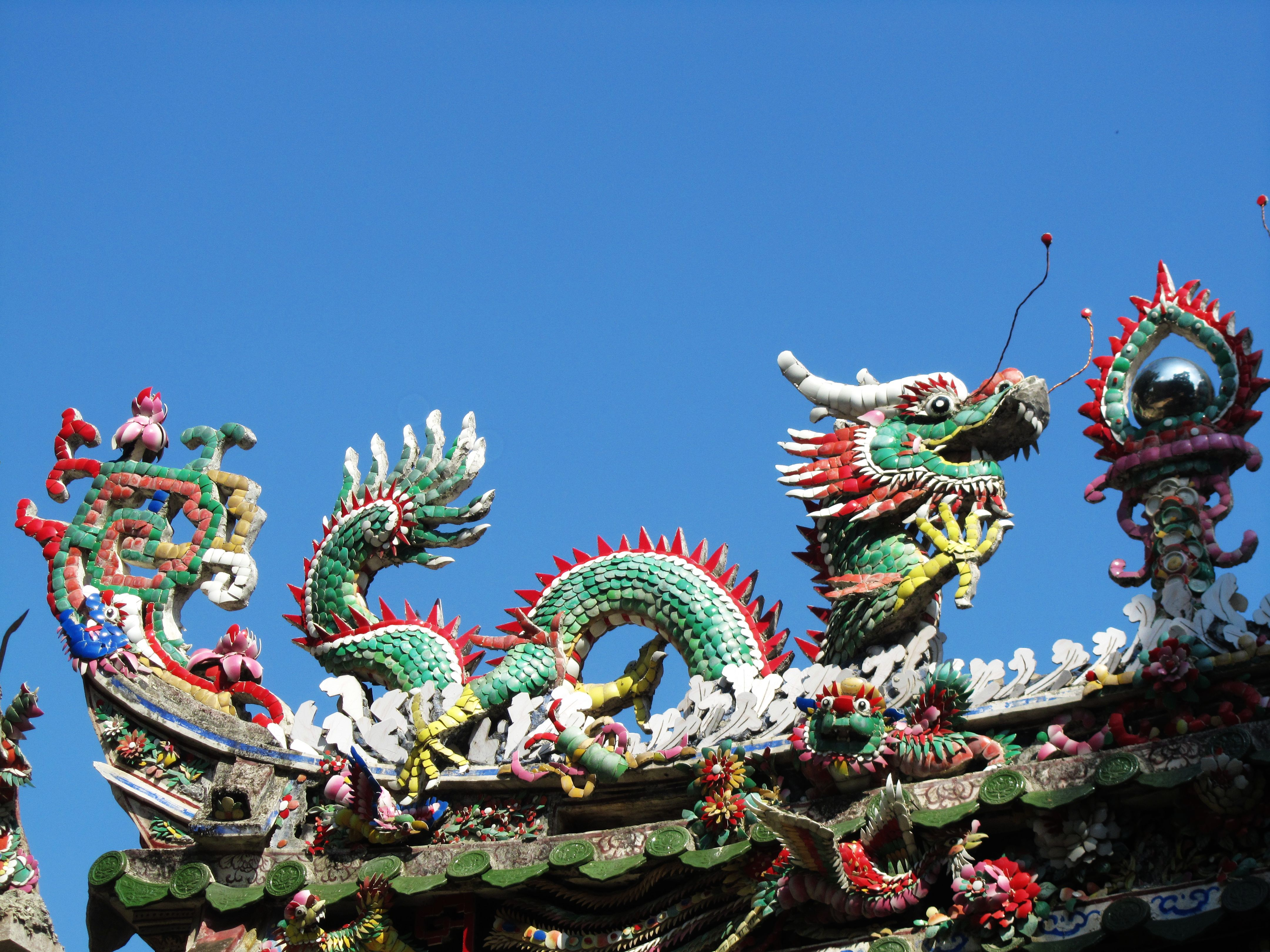
A Chinese dragon sculpture on the roof of Amoy Memorial Temple of Lord Guan, Amoy, Hokkien.

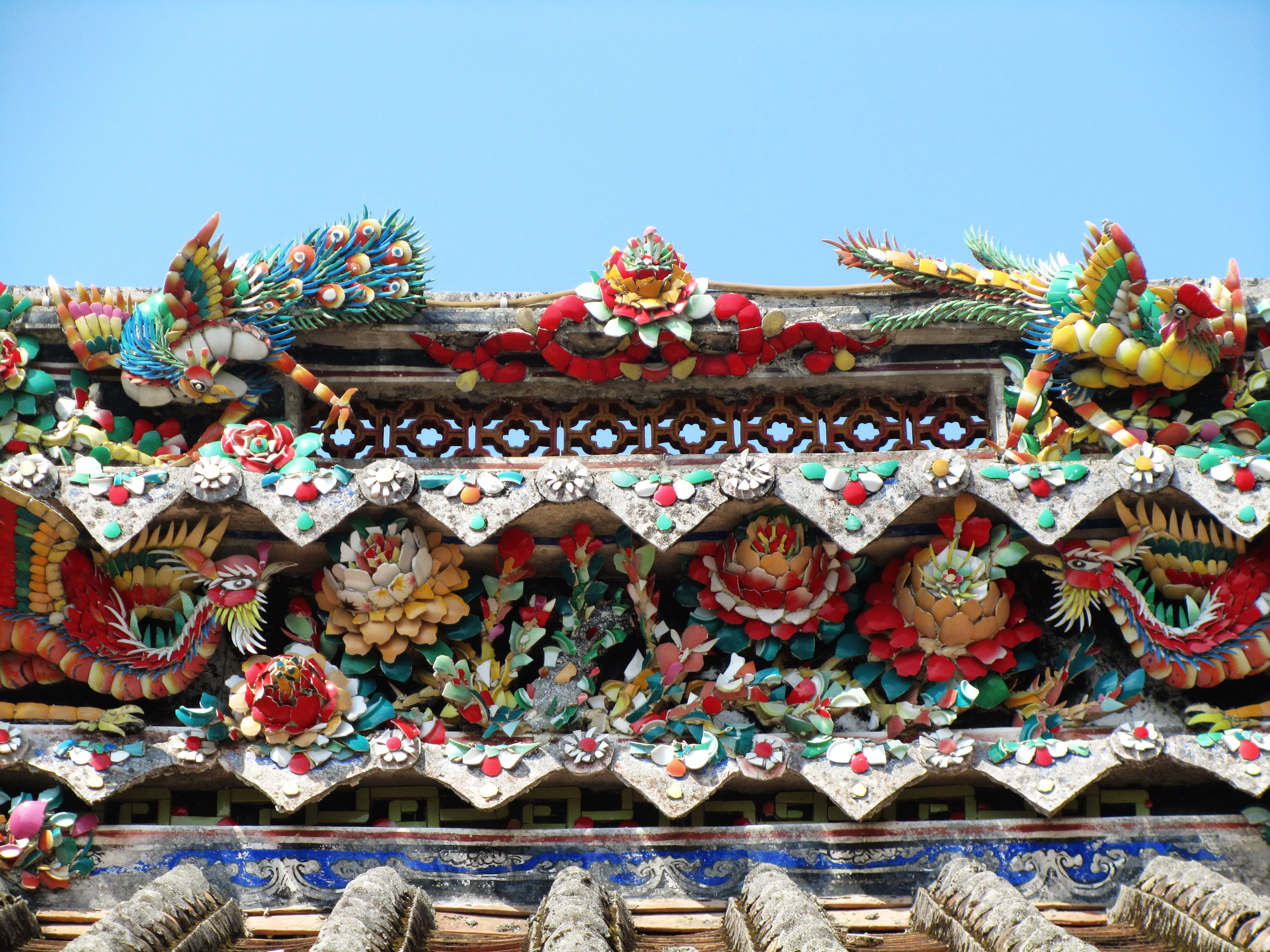
Cut porcelain carving decorations above the main door of Nanfeng Ancestral Temple.

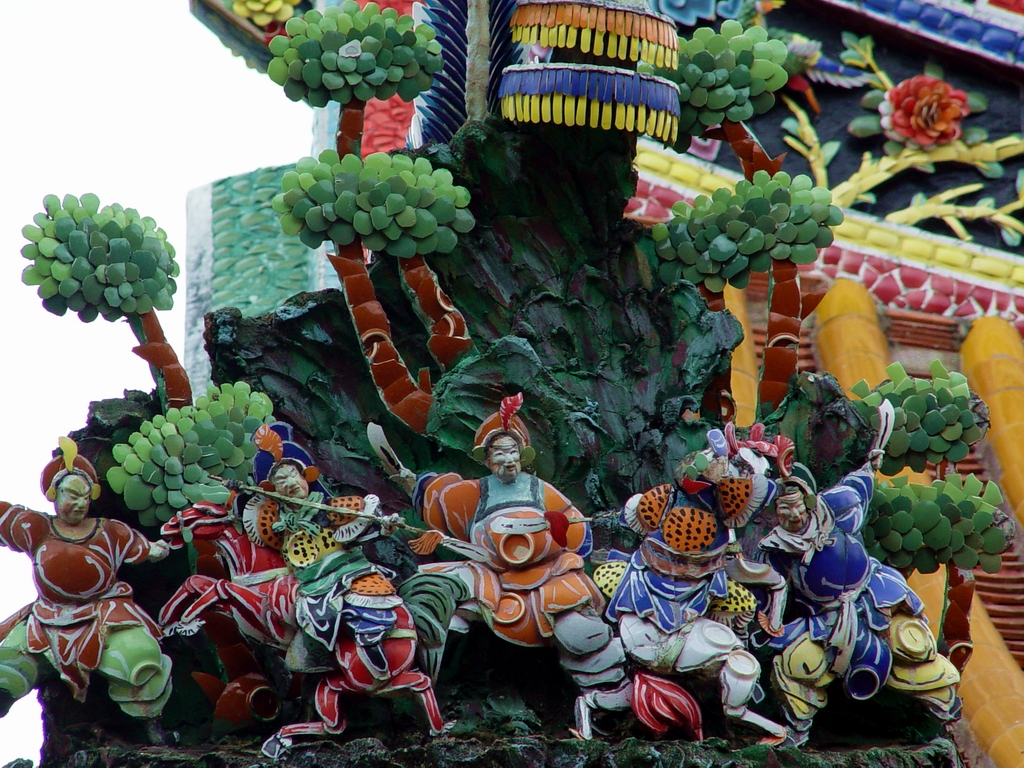
Cut porcelain carving decorations on Beipu Citian Temple, Hsinchu County, Taiwan.

== Hokkien Sanheyuan ==
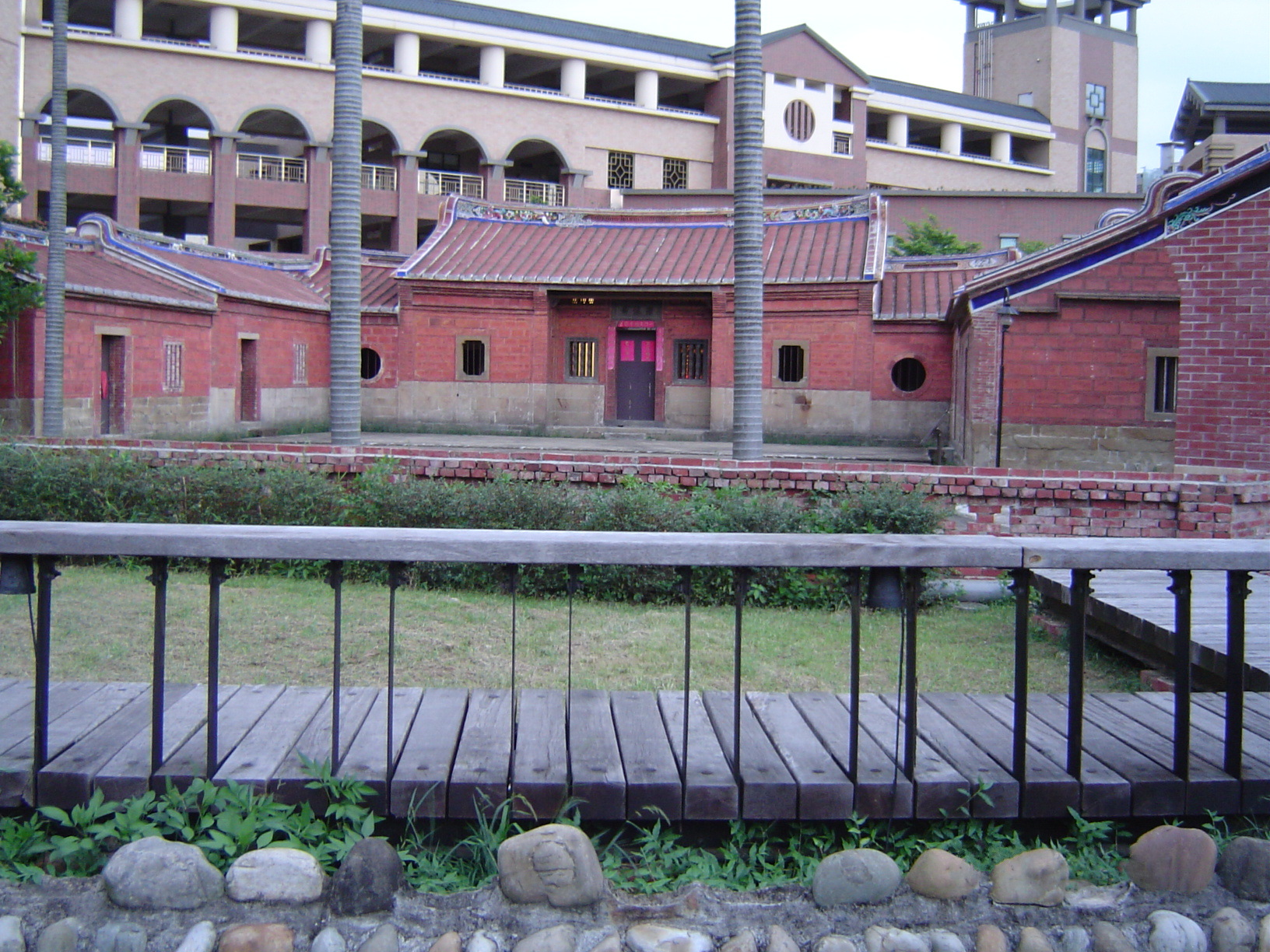
The Huang Family Qianrang Estate, in Taipei, Taiwan, is a Sanheyuan.

Sanheyuan (Pe̍h-ōe-jī: Sam-ha̍h-īnn; Traditional Chinese: 三合院, literally "Three-combo building") is a type of building found throughout most of the Greater China region. They are residences with structures on three sides of a courtyard, forming an inverted U-shape. While this style is shared by nearly all Han Chinese groups, Hokkien Sanheyuan have been noted by their usage of multiple wings (called "protecting dragons" in Taiwan) to spread outward, a trait quite distinctive to Hoklo Sanheyuan.

== Têng-á-kha ==
Têng-á-kha (Pe̍h-ōe-jī: Têng-á-kha; Traditional Chinese: 亭仔跤) is a style of architecture found in much of Southern China and is considered the Hokkien counterpart to the Cantonese tong lau. It is a style that incorporates elements from Western European architecture, arising slowly in late 18th century due to the Hokkien contact with Western European culture in Southeast Asia. A typical têng-á-kha has a ground floor used for running some sort of business (such as a grocery store) and upper floors that are used for residential purposes. Amoy's têng-á-khas are said to be marked by having pink and white as main colorings, use of streets full of têng-á-khas such as markets, and the distribution of têng-á-khas in net-like structures. The city of Chinchew has also been noted for having a well-preserved set of têng-á-khas.

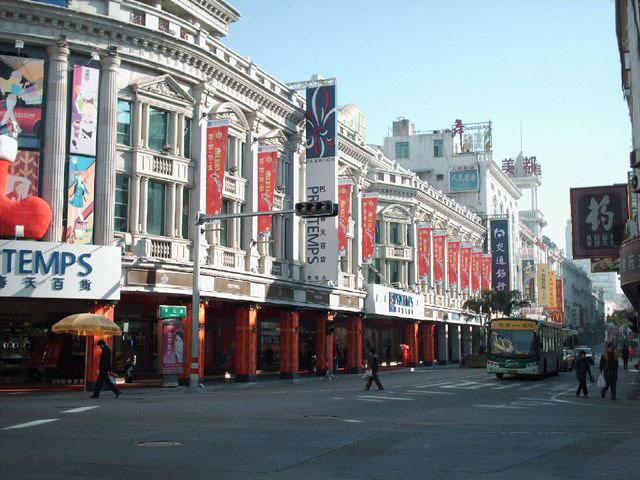
Zhongshan Road, Amoy, is filled with têng-á-khas.

The Hayashi Department Store in Tainan, Taiwan, is also considered a good example of têng-á-kha.

== Others ==
=== Hokkien earthen buildings ===
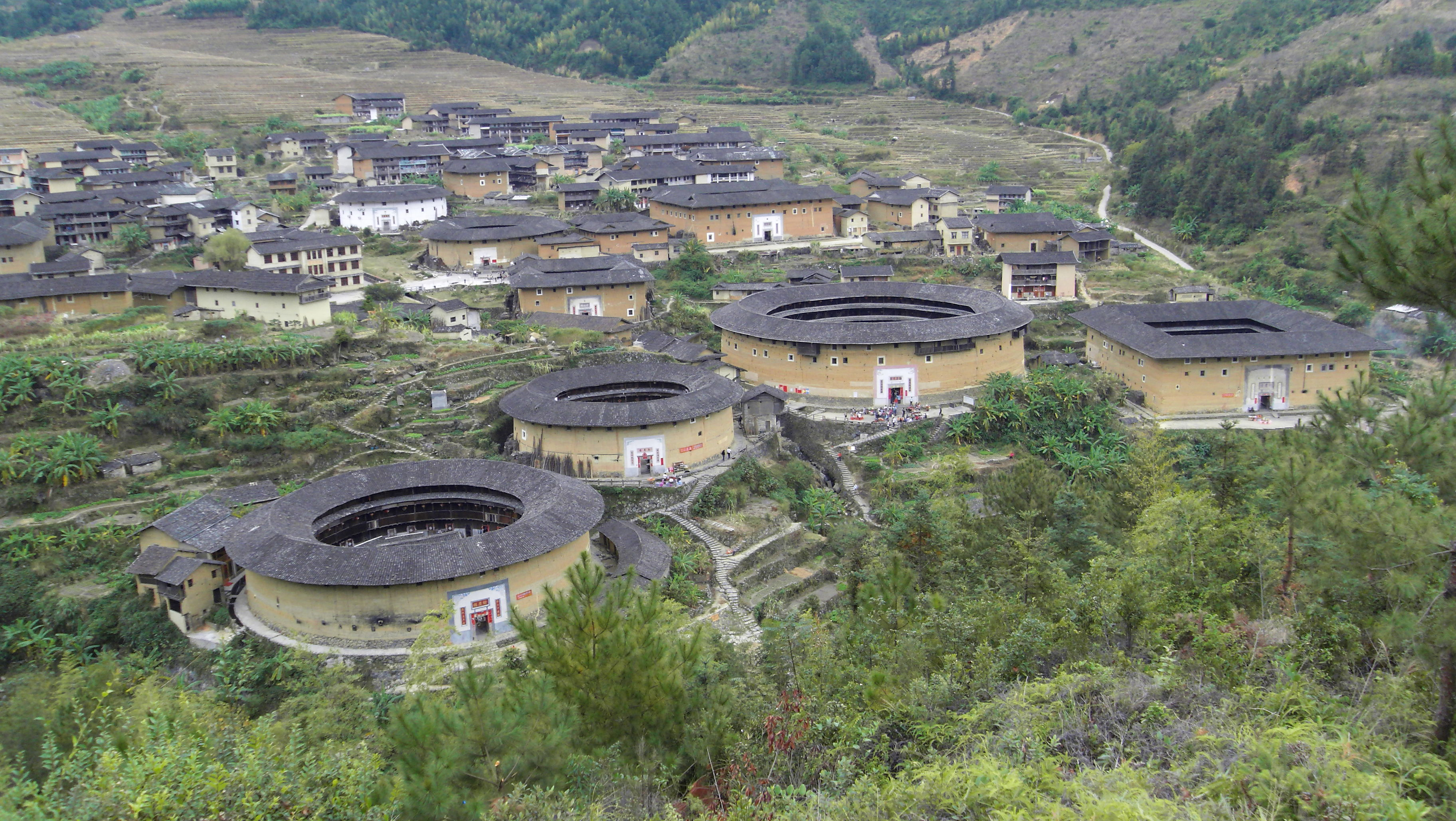
Tshe-khue Tulou cluster in Lêng-nâ, Fujian.

Hokkien earthen buildings (Pe̍h-ōe-jī: Hok-kiàn thóo-lâu; Traditional Chinese: 福建土樓, literally "Hokkien earthen building"), called "Fujian Tulou" in Mandarin Chinese, is another distinct type of architecture found in the Hokkien region. It is a set of large, enclosed and fortified earth buildings associated with the Hakka people, who speak the Hakka language, rather than Hoklo. However, it has been noted that this style of architecture is found almost exclusively among Hakka people in Fujian province and thus has become associated with the region.

== In Modern Architecture ==
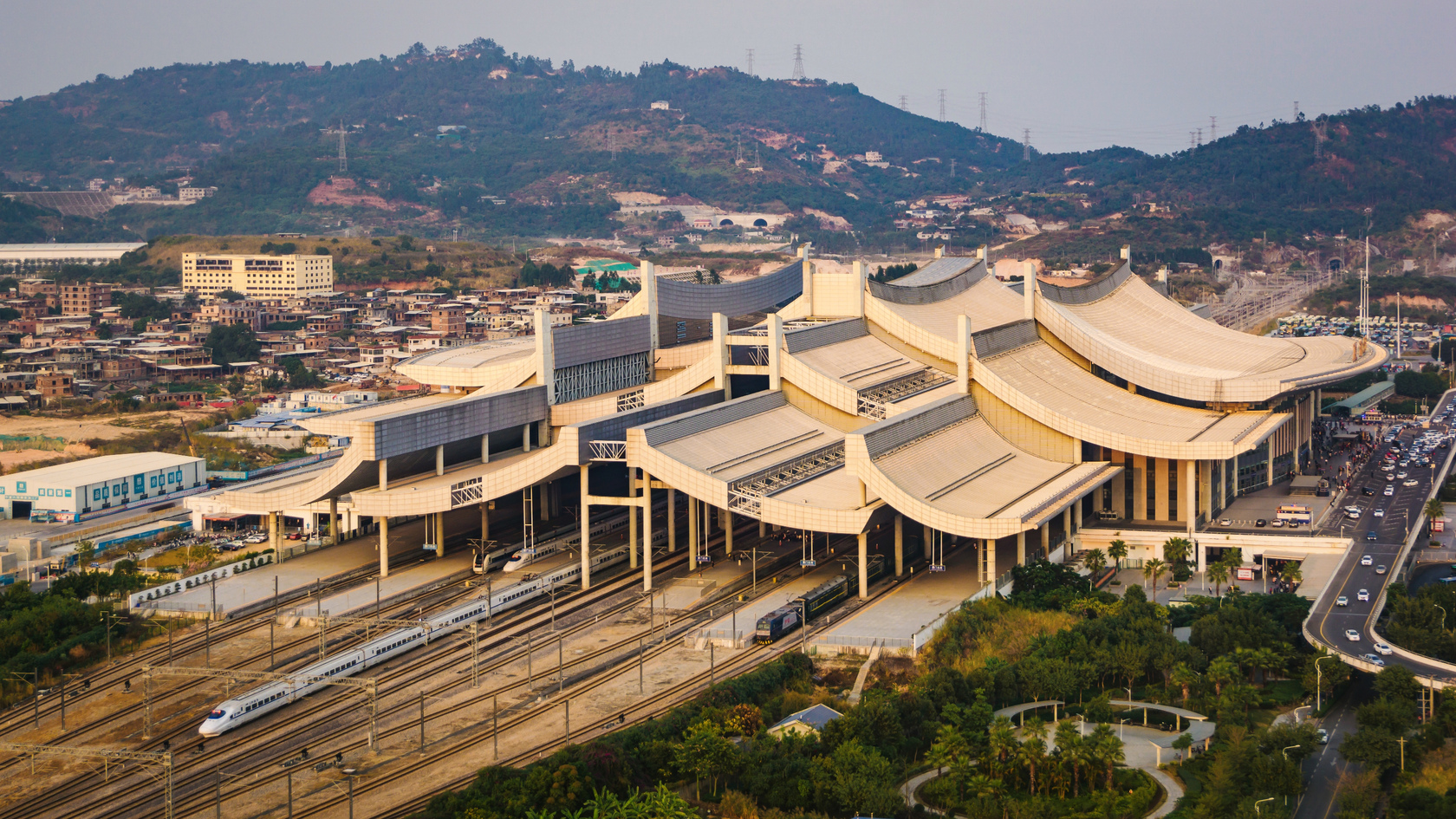
Xiamen North Railway Station

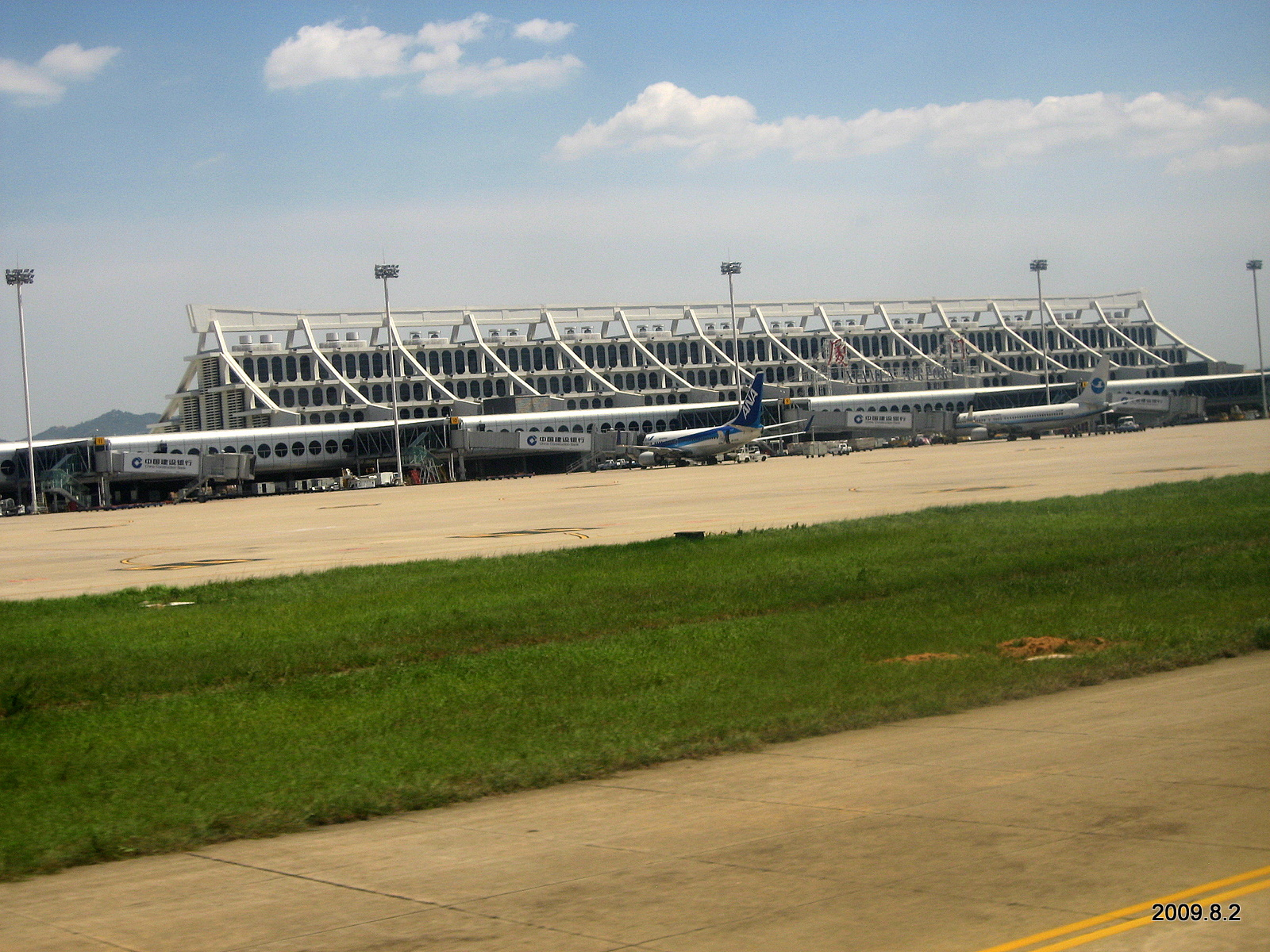
Xiamen Gaoqi International Airport Terminal 3

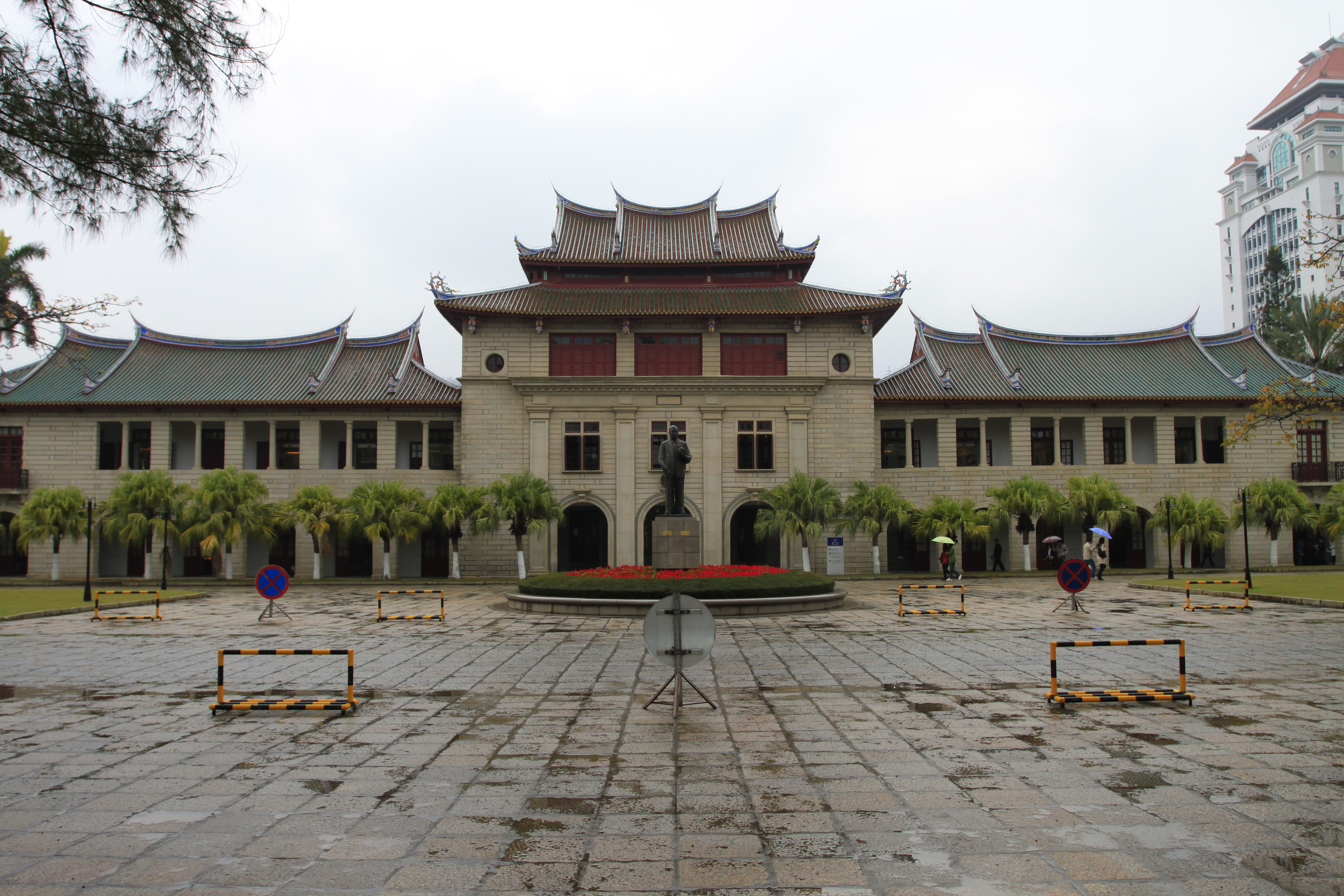
Xiamen University campus

== See also ==
- Architecture of Taiwan
- Architecture of Singapore
- Cantonese architecture
- Hakka architecture
- Architecture of Jiangxi
- Chinese architecture

== Bibliography ==
- Knapp, Ronald G. (2019). China's Old Dwellings. University of Hawaii Press.

== News articles ==
- "Exhibition sheds light on architectural influence between Fujian, Singapore". The Straits Times (online). 2019-10-28.
