= Hokkien entertainment media =

Hokkien media is the mass media produced in Hokkien. Taiwan is by far the largest producer of Hokkien-language media.

The "golden age" of both Hokkien popular music and film in Asia was the mid-1950s through to the mid-1960s.

== Films ==
Many films in Taiwan are produced in Hokkien. Many other films that are primarily in Mandarin or some other language may also have some Taiwanese dialogue.

The first Hokkien films shown in Taiwan were shot in Hong Kong and featured dialogue in the Amoy dialect. The increasing popularity of Amoy films in Taiwan drew audiences away from Taiwanese opera performances, so some troupe leaders began making films in Taiwanese Hokkien. Over 1,000 Hokkien-language films were made in Taiwan between 1956 and 1961. The popularity of Amoy films, established in the early 1950s, then fell, and was overtaken by Taiwanese Hokkien films. By 1981, the number of Taiwanese Hokkien films made numbered 2,000. However, censorship during Taiwan's White Terror period heavily affected Hokkien pop and film. As a result, approximately 160 Hokken-language films from this period survive, all held by the Taiwan Film and Audiovisual Institute (TFAI). When Ray Jing became leader of the National Film Archive, a predecessor organization to the Taiwan Film and Audiovisual Institute, he began focusing the organization's efforts on the preservation of Hokkien-language films. The Taiwan Cinema Digital Restoration Project was launched in 2013 by the TFAI. The project sought to archive and restore Hokkien-language films.

Besides Taiwan, some Hokkien films have also been produced in Mainland China, Singapore, Malaysia, Indonesia and Philippines.

== Television ==
There are a variety of television dramas, news broadcasts, variety shows, etc. that are produced in Hokkien. There were restrictions on the broadcasting of Hokkien in Taiwan, but they were lifted in the 1980s.

Taiwanese dubs of Cartoon Network shows feature some Taiwanese-language dialogue.

== Music ==
The recording of Hokkien opera and songs in Taiwan and China can be traced back to the 1920s. During the middle stage of Japanese colonial rule in Taiwan, there was an industry of recorded Hokkien popular music. This was funded mainly by American record companies such as Columbia Records and RCA. Although significant, this industry was largely ended with the start of the Second Sino-Japanese War in 1937 and the subsequent restrictions on cultural production in Taiwanese and Hakka.

== See also ==
- Nanguan music, a genre of Chinese classical music originating in Fujian
