= Comparison of Hokkien writing systems =

The chart below compares a number of different writing systems for Hokkien, including bopomofo, kana, Hangul, various romanizations, and Chinese characters.

== Comparison chart ==
Vowels
IPA	Pe̍h-ōe-jī	Tâi-lô	TLPA	BP	MLT	DT	Kana	Phonetic Symbols	Hangul	Example	
IPA	Pe̍h-ōe-jī	Tâi-lô	TLPA	BP	MLT	DT	Kana	Phonetic Symbols	Hangul	Traditional	Simplified
a	a	a	a	a	a	a	アア	ㄚ	ᅡ	亞洲	亚洲
ap	ap	ap	ap	ap	ab/ap	āp/ap	アㇷ゚	ㄚㆴ	압	壓力	压力
at	at	at	at	at	ad/at	āt/at	アッ	ㄚㆵ	앋	警察	警察
ak	ak	ak	ak	ak	ag/ak	āk/ak	アㇰ	ㄚㆻ	악	沃水	沃水
aʔ	ah	ah	ah	ah	aq/ah	āh/ah	アァ	ㄚㆷ	앟	牛肉	牛肉
ã	aⁿ	ann	ann/aN	na	va	ann/aⁿ	アア	ㆩ	앗	三十	三十
ɔ	o͘	oo	oo	oo	o	o	オオ	ㆦ	ᅩ	烏色	乌色
ɔk	ok	ok	ok	ok	og/ok	ok	オㇰ	ㆦㆻ	옥	中國	中国
ɔ̃	oⁿ	onn	oonn/ooN	noo	vo	onn/oⁿ	オオ	ㆧ	옷	否	否
ə	o	o	o	o	ø	or	オ̅オ̅	ㄜ	ᅥ	澳洲	澳洲
o	o	o	o	o	ø	or	ヲヲ	ㄛ	ᅥ	澳洲	澳洲
e	e	e	e	e	e	e	エエ	ㆤ	ᅦ	下晡	下晡
ẽ	eⁿ	enn	enn/eN	ne	ve	enn/eⁿ	エエ	ㆥ	엣	青	青
i	i	i	i	i	i	i	イイ	ㄧ	ᅵ	醫學	医学
iɛn	ian	ian	ian	ian	ien	ian/en	イェヌ	ㄧㄢ	엔	鉛筆	铅笔
iəŋ	eng	ing	ing	ing	eng	ing	イェン	ㄧㄥ	영	英國	英国
iək	ek	ik	ik	ik	eg/ek	ik	イェㇰ	ㄧㆻ	역	翻譯	翻译
ĩ	iⁿ	inn	inn/iN	ni	vi	inn/iⁿ	イイ	ㆪ	잇	病院	病院
ai	ai	ai	ai	ai	ai	ai	アイ	ㄞ	ᅢ	愛情	爱情
aĩ	aiⁿ	ainn	ainn/aiN	nai	vai	ainn/aiⁿ	アイ	ㆮ	앳	載	载
au	au	au	au	au	au	au	アウ	ㆯ	알	歐洲	欧洲
am	am	am	am	am	am	am	アム	ㆰ	암	暗時	暗时
ɔm	om	om	om	om	om	om	オム	ㆱ	옴	參	参
m̩	m	m	m	m	m	m	ム	ㆬ	음	阿姆	阿姆
ɔŋ	ong	ong	ong	ong	ong	ong	オン	ㆲ	옹	王梨	王梨
ŋ̍	ng	ng	ng	ng	ng	ng	ン	ㆭ	응	黃色	黄色
u	u	u	u	u	u	u	ウウ	ㄨ	ᅮ	有無	有无
ua	oa	ua	ua	ua	oa	ua	ヲア	ㄨㄚ	ᅪ	歌曲	歌曲
ue	oe	ue	ue	ue	oe	ue	ヲエ	ㄨㆤ	ᅰ	講話	讲话
uai	oai	uai	uai	uai	oai	uai	ヲァイ	ㄨㄞ	ᅫ	奇怪	奇怪
uan	oan	uan	uan	uan	oan	uan	ヲァヌ	ㄨㄢ	왠	人員	人员
ɨ	i	ir	ir	i	i	i	ウ̅ウ̅	ㆨ	ᅵ	豬肉	猪肉
(i)ũ	(i)uⁿ	(i)unn	(i)unn/uN	n(i)u	v(i)u	(i)unn/uⁿ	ウウ	ㆫ	윳	舀水	舀水

Consonants
IPA	Pe̍h-ōe-jī	Tâi-lô	TLPA	BP	MLT	DT	Kana	Phonetic Symbols	Hangul	Example	
IPA	Pe̍h-ōe-jī	Tâi-lô	TLPA	BP	MLT	DT	Kana	Phonetic Symbols	Hangul	Traditional	Simplified
p	p	p	p	b	p	b	パア	ㄅ	ᄇ	報紙	报纸
b	b	b	b	bb	b	bh	バア	ㆠ	ᄈ	閩南	闽南
pʰ	ph	ph	ph	p	ph	p	パ̣ア	ㄆ	ᄑ	普通	普通
m	m	m	m	bb	m	m	マア	ㄇ	ᄆ	請問	请问
t	t	t	t	d	t	d	タア	ㄉ	ᄃ	豬肉	猪肉
tʰ	th	th	th	t	th	t	タ̣ア	ㄊ	ᄐ	普通	普通
n	n	n	n	n	n	n	ナア	ㄋ	ᄂ	過年	过年
nŋ	nng	nng	nng	lng	nng	nng	ヌン	ㄋㆭ		雞卵	鸡卵
l	l	l	l	l	l	l	ラア	ㄌ	ᄅ	樂觀	乐观
k	k	k	k	g	k	g	カア	ㄍ	ᄀ	價值	价值
ɡ	g	g	g	gg	g	gh	ガア	ㆣ	ᄁ	牛奶	牛奶
kʰ	kh	kh	kh	k	kh	k	カ̣ア	ㄎ	ᄏ	客廳	客厅
h	h	h	h	h	h	h	ハア	ㄏ	ᄒ	煩惱	烦恼
tɕi	chi	tsi	zi	zi	ci	zi	チイ	ㄐ	ᄌ	支持	支持
ʑi	ji	ji	ji	li	ji	r	ジイ	ㆢ	ᄍ	漢字	汉字
tɕʰi	chhi	tshi	ci	ci	chi	ci	チ̣イ	ㄑ	ᄎ	支持	支持
ɕi	si	si	si	si	si	si	シイ	ㄒ	ㅅ	是否	是否
ts	ch	ts	z	z	z	z	サ̅ア	ㄗ	ᄌ	報紙	报纸
dz	j	j	j	l	j	r	ザア	ㆡ	ᄍ	熱天	热天
tsʰ	chh	tsh	c	c	zh	c	サ̣̅ア	ㄘ	ᄎ	参加	参加
s	s	s	s	s	s	s	サア	ㄙ	ㅅ	司法	司法

Tones
Tone name	IPA	Pe̍h-ōe-jī	Tâi-lô	TLPA	BP	MLT	DT	Kana (normal vowels)	Kana (nasal vowels)	Phonetic Symbols	Hangul	Example	
Tone name	IPA	Pe̍h-ōe-jī	Tâi-lô	TLPA	BP	MLT	DT	Kana (normal vowels)	Kana (nasal vowels)	Phonetic Symbols	Hangul	Traditional	Simplified
Yin level (陰平 1)	a˥	a	a	a1	ā	af	a	アア	アア	ㄚ	ᄋ	公司	公司
Yin rising (陰上 2)	a˥˧	á	á	a2	ǎ	ar	à	アア	アア	ㄚˋ	ᄅ	報紙	报纸
Yin departing (陰去 3)	a˨˩	à	à	a3	à	ax	â	アア	アア	ㄚ˪	ᄂ	興趣	兴趣
Yin entering (陰入 4)	ap˩ at˩ ak˩ aʔ˩	ap at ak ah	ah	a4	āp āt āk āh	ab ad ag aq	āp āt āk āh	アㇷ゚ アッ アㇰ アァ	アㇷ゚ アッ アㇰ アァ	ㄚㆴ ㄚㆵ ㄚㆻ ㄚㆷ	ᄋ	血壓 警察 中國 牛肉	血压 警察 中国 牛肉
Yang level (陽平 5)	a˧˥	â	â	a5	ǎ	aa	ǎ	アア	アア	ㄚˊ	ᄉ	人員	人员
Yang rising (陽上 6)		ǎ	ǎ	a6		aar						老爸	老爸
Yang departing (陽去 7)	a˧	ā	ā	a7	â	a	ā	アア	アア	ㄚ˫	ᄀ	草地	草地
Yang entering (陽入 8)	ap˥ at˥ ak˥ aʔ˥	a̍p a̍t a̍k a̍h	a̍h	a8	áp át ák áh	ap at ak ah	ap at ak ah	アㇷ゚ アッ アㇰ アァ	アㇷ゚ アッ アㇰ アァ	ㄚㆴ˙ ㄚㆵ˙ ㄚㆻ˙ ㄚㆷ˙	ᄇ	配合 法律 文學 歇熱	配合 法律 文学 歇热
High rising (9)	a˥˥	ă	a̋	a9			á				ㅋ	昨昏	昨昏
Neutral (0)	a˨	--a	--ah	a0		~a	å					入去	入去

- Note: The bopomofo extended characters in the zhuyin row require a UTF-8 font capable of displaying Unicode values 31A0–31B7 (ex. Code2000 true type font).

== See also ==
- Hokkien
- Hokkien culture
- Written Hokkien
- Hokkien entertainment media
- Taiwanese Hokkien
- Singapore Hokkien
- Penang Hokkien
- Southern Malaysia Hokkien
- Medan Hokkien
- Philippine Hokkien
- Speak Hokkien Campaign
