= Phofsit Daibuun =

Orthography in the Latin alphabet for Taiwanese Hokkien

Phofsit Daibuun (普實臺文, PSDB) is an orthography in the Latin alphabet for Taiwanese Hokkien based on Modern Literal Taiwanese. It allows for the use of the ASCII character set to indicate the proper lexical tones without any subsidiary scripts or diacritic symbols.

== Phonology ==
Consonants
| | | | Dental | Alveolo-palatal | Bilabial | Alveolar | Velar | Glottal |
| Plosive | voiceless | unaspiration | | | p | d | k | ' ([ʔ]) |
| Plosive | voiceless | aspiration | | | ph | t | q | |
| Plosive | voiced | unaspiration | | | b | | g | |
| Affricate | voiceless | unaspiration | z | c | | | | |
| Affricate | voiceless | aspiration | zh | ch | | | | |
| Affricate | voiced | unaspiration | | j | | | | |
| Fricative | voiceless | unaspiration | s | si | | | | |
| Fricative | voiceless | aspiration | | | | | | h |
| Nasal | voiced | unaspiration | | | m/v | n | ng/v | |
| Lateral | voiced | unaspiration | | | | l | | |

Nasalized syllables are indicated by "v" preceding the syllable nucleus. Except for b, j, l, which do not precede nasalized vowels, and m and n, which are already nasals.

| Normal | c | ch | d | g | h | k | p | ph | q | s | t | z | zh | ø |
| Nasalized | cv | chv | dv | gv | hv | kv | pv | phv | qv | sv | tv | zv | zhv | v |
| Example | 爭(cvy) | 星(chvy) | 鄭(dve) | 硬(gve) | 耳(hvi) | 件(kvia) | 病(pve) | 鼻(phvi) | 扲(qvii) | 漬(svi) | 縫(tvi) | 濺(zvoa) | 青(zhvef) | 院(vi) |

Vowels
| | Front | Central | Back |
| Close | i | | u |
| Close-mid | e | | oi(2) |
| Mid | | oi(1) | |
| Open-mid | | | o |
| Open | a | | |

Regarding the pronunciation of "oi":

- in southern regions such as Tainan, the pronunciation tends toward oi(1), the mid central vowel ə
- in central and northern regions, the pronunciation tends toward oi(2), the close-mid back unrounded vowel ɤ

=== Tone spellings ===
- The table below shows the spelling of the basic tone (7) mid tone, and the four sub-tones (1) high, (5) rising, (3) low falling/low, (2) falling/high falling
- (') indicates a changed tone
- (**) indicates a tone that does not exist in standard Taiwanese

==== Monophthongs ====
| a (ha)夏 | af 阿 | aa (gaa)牙 | ax (pax)豹 | ar (kar)絞 |
| i 異 | y 伊 | ii 姨 | ix 意 | ie 椅 |
| u 有 | w 污 | uu (guu)牛 | ux 熨 | uo 羽 |
| e 下 | ef (qef)溪(qef) | ee 的 | ex (kex)嫁 | ea 矮 |
| o 芋 | of 黑 | oo 湖 | ox (tox)兔 | or 挖 |
| oi (goi)餓 | oy 渦 | ooi 蚵 | oix 奧 | oir 襖 |
| ng (hng)遠 | ngf 秧 | ngg 黃 | ngx 怏 | ngr 阮 |
| m 毋 | mf' (mfpooi)姆婆 | mm 蕾 | mx' (mxsi)不是 | mr 姆 |

==== Diphthongs ====
| ai (dai)代 | ay 哀 | aai (daai)台 | aix 愛 | ae 藹 |
| au 後 | aw 歐 | aau 喉 | aux 懊 | ao (kao)狗 |
| ia 夜 | iaf 埃 | iaa 爺 | iax 厭 | iar 野 |
| iau 耀 | iaw 邀 | iaau 姚 | iaux (tiaux)跳 | iao (ciao)鳥 |
| ioi (bioi)廟 | ioy 腰 | iooi 搖 | ioix (kioix)叫 | ioir (cioir)少 |
| iu 柚 | iw 憂 | iuu 油 | iux 幼 | iuo 友 |
| oa (doa)大 | oaf (koaf)歌 | oaa (zoaa)蛇 | oax (hoax)化 | oar (zoar)紙 |
| oai (hoai)壞 | oay (koay)乖 | oaai (hoaai)懷 | oaix (koaix)怪 | oae (koae)拐 |
| oe 話 | oef 鍋 | oee 唯 | oex (hoex)貨 | oea 挖 |
| ui 位 | uy 威 | uii 圍 | uix 畏 | uie 委 |

==== Nasal finals ====
| an (han)限 | afn 安 | aan 緊 | axn 案 | arn (karn)簡 |
| ang (bang)網 | afng 翁 | aang 紅 | axng 甕 | arng (karng)講 |
| am 頷 | afm 醃 | aam 涵 | axm 暗 | arm 洝 |
| eng 用 | efng 鷹 | eeng 閒 | exng 應 | erng 泳 |
| iam 豔 | iafm 閹 | iaam 鹽 | iaxm 厭 | iarm 掩 |
| iang 恙 | iafng 央 | iaang 陽 | iaxng 泱 | iarng 養 |
| ien 沿 | iefn 煙 | ieen 鉛 | iexn 宴 | iern 演 |
| in 胤 | yn 因 | iin 云 | ixn 印 | irn 引 |
| im (dim)燉 | ym 音 | iim 淫 | ixm 蔭 | irm 飲 |
| iong 用 | iofng 央 | ioong 容 | ioxng 擁 | iorng 勇 |
| oan 緩 | oafn 冤 | oaan 完 | oaxn 怨 | oarn 遠 |
| ong 旺 | ofng 汪 | oong 王 | oxng 罋 | orng 往 |
| un 運 | wn 溫 | uun 勻 | uxn 搵 | urn 隱 |
| om' 掩'埋 | ofm 掩 | oom** | oxm (doxm)頓 | orm' (dorm)頓'頭 |

==== Checked syllables ====
- # symbol represents characters used for their meaning, rather than their pronunciation

===== Monophthong =====
| | Labial | Dental | Velar | Open |
| Low | ab 壓 | ad 握 | ag 渥 | aq 鴨 |
| High | ap 盒 | at (bat)密 | ak (bak)目 | ah (tah)疊 |
| Low | ib 揖 | id 壹 | ig** | iq (tiq)鐵 |
| High | ip 佾 | it 軼 | ik** | ih 胰 |
| Low | ub** | ud 熨 | ug** | uq (duq)拄 |
| High | up** | ut (kut)滑 | uk** | uh (duh)刺 |
| Low | eb** | ed** | eg 億 | eq (keq)格 |
| High | ep** | et** | 役 | eh 狹 |
| Low | ob (lob)#踏 | od** | og 惡 | oq (moq)漏平 |
| High | op (lop'lob) | ot** | ok (dok)獨 | oh (moh)膜 |
| Low | oib** | oid** | oig** | oiq #慢 |
| High | oip** | oit** | oik** | oih 學 |

===== Diphthong =====
| iab #掩藏 | ied 謁 | iag (siag)摔 | iaq 扼 |
| iap 葉 | iet 搧 | iak (diak)彈 | iah 頁 |
| | oad #轉 | iog | auq (kauq)輾 |
| | oat 悅 | iok 育 | auh (bauh)貿 |
| iuq (kiuq)縮 | | | iauq (hiauq)剝 |
| iuh' (kiuh)縮 | | | iauh (hiauh)剝 |
| oaq (koaq)割 | ioiq #猜 | oeq (hoeq)血 | uiq (huiq)血 |
| oah 活 | ioih 藥 | oeh 劃 | uih 劃 |

==== Rarely used vowels ====
| Vowel | Example |
|---|---|
| io | nio, =nio 讓；svio, =sviu 想 |
| iof | diofng 忠；hviof, =hviw香 |
| ioo | nioo, =niuu 量，想；hioong affectionate, cruel |
| iox | cioxng 將，從；hioxng 向 |
| ior | nior, =niuo 兩；bioir 秒 |
| ioq | hioq 嗎 (interrogative) |
| oaiq | voaiq 瘸著走 |
| oaih' | vih'voaih'kioix 噫椏叫 |
| mq | hmq, =hmr strike down forcefully |
| mh | hmh insidious, silent; hmq'hmh |
| ngq | hngq (expression of agreement) |
| ngh | dngh 當, 擔任；hngh (expression of disapproval) |

== Examples ==
=== Universal Declaration of Human Rights ===
PSDB
Lienhabkog seakaix jinqoaan soangieen

De id diaau

Sofu ee laang cit zhutsix doixsi zuxiuu ee, jichviar di zungiaam kab qoanli siong itlut pengderng. Langlaang tiensefng doi u lysexng kab liongsym, erngkay aix kafnnar hviadi kaxngqoarn laai hoxsiong duietai.

English
Universal Declaration of Human Rights

Article 1

All human beings are born free and equal in dignity and rights. They are endowed with reason and conscience and should act towards one another in a spirit of brotherhood.

=== Greetings ===
| PSDB | Translation | Remarks |
|---|---|---|
| Ciaqpar`boe? | Greetings. | ("Have you eaten?") |
| Sitlea! | Sorry for my impoliteness! | (lit., "Disrespect") |
| Goar tviaf booi. | I don't understand. | (lit., "I hear not") |
| Piexnsor di doyui? | Where's the bathroom? | (lit., "bathroom is where?") |
| Loflat! Kafmsia! | Thank you |
| Ho daf `lax! | Cheers! | (lit., Let it [the cup/glass] be dry [empty]!) |
| Lie karm korng Engguo? | Do you speak English? |
| Siensvy korng, hagsefng diaxmdiam tviaf. | The teacher talks, the students quietly listen. |
| Kin'afjit hit'ee zabor-gyn'ar laai goarn daw qvoax goar. | Today that girl came to my house to see me. |
| Kin'axm larn beq qix Suxliim Iaxchi'ar. | Tonight, we want to go to Shilin Night Market. |

== Comparison chart ==
Vowels
| IPA | Pe̍h-ōe-jī | Tâi-lô | TLPA | BP | MLT | DT | Kana | Phonetic Symbols | Hangul | Example | |
| IPA | Pe̍h-ōe-jī | Tâi-lô | TLPA | BP | MLT | DT | Kana | Phonetic Symbols | Hangul | Traditional | Simplified |
|---|---|---|---|---|---|---|---|---|---|---|---|
| a | a | a | a | a | a | a | アア | ㄚ | ᅡ | 亞洲 | 亚洲 |
| ap | ap | ap | ap | ap | ab/ap | āp/ap | アㇷ゚ | ㄚㆴ | 압 | 壓力 | 压力 |
| at | at | at | at | at | ad/at | āt/at | アッ | ㄚㆵ | 앋 | 警察 | 警察 |
| ak | ak | ak | ak | ak | ag/ak | āk/ak | アㇰ | ㄚㆻ | 악 | 沃水 | 沃水 |
| aʔ | ah | ah | ah | ah | aq/ah | āh/ah | アァ | ㄚㆷ | 앟 | 牛肉 | 牛肉 |
| ã | aⁿ | ann | ann/aN | na | va | ann/aⁿ | アア | ㆩ | 앗 | 三十 | 三十 |
| ɔ | o͘ | oo | oo | oo | o | o | オオ | ㆦ | ᅩ | 烏色 | 乌色 |
| ɔk | ok | ok | ok | ok | og/ok | ok | オㇰ | ㆦㆻ | 옥 | 中國 | 中国 |
| ɔ̃ | oⁿ | onn | oonn/ooN | noo | vo | onn/oⁿ | オオ | ㆧ | 옷 | 否 | 否 |
| ə | o | o | o | o | ø | or | オ̅オ̅ | ㄜ | ᅥ | 澳洲 | 澳洲 |
| o | o | o | o | o | ø | or | ヲヲ | ㄛ | ᅥ | 澳洲 | 澳洲 |
| e | e | e | e | e | e | e | エエ | ㆤ | ᅦ | 下晡 | 下晡 |
| ẽ | eⁿ | enn | enn/eN | ne | ve | enn/eⁿ | エエ | ㆥ | 엣 | 青 | 青 |
| i | i | i | i | i | i | i | イイ | ㄧ | ᅵ | 醫學 | 医学 |
| iɛn | ian | ian | ian | ian | ien | ian/en | イェヌ | ㄧㄢ | 엔 | 鉛筆 | 铅笔 |
| iəŋ | eng | ing | ing | ing | eng | ing | イェン | ㄧㄥ | 영 | 英國 | 英国 |
| iək | ek | ik | ik | ik | eg/ek | ik | イェㇰ | ㄧㆻ | 역 | 翻譯 | 翻译 |
| ĩ | iⁿ | inn | inn/iN | ni | vi | inn/iⁿ | イイ | ㆪ | 잇 | 病院 | 病院 |
| ai | ai | ai | ai | ai | ai | ai | アイ | ㄞ | ᅢ | 愛情 | 爱情 |
| aĩ | aiⁿ | ainn | ainn/aiN | nai | vai | ainn/aiⁿ | アイ | ㆮ | 앳 | 載 | 载 |
| au | au | au | au | au | au | au | アウ | ㆯ | 알 | 歐洲 | 欧洲 |
| am | am | am | am | am | am | am | アム | ㆰ | 암 | 暗時 | 暗时 |
| ɔm | om | om | om | om | om | om | オム | ㆱ | 옴 | 參 | 参 |
| m̩ | m | m | m | m | m | m | ム | ㆬ | 음 | 阿姆 | 阿姆 |
| ɔŋ | ong | ong | ong | ong | ong | ong | オン | ㆲ | 옹 | 王梨 | 王梨 |
| ŋ̍ | ng | ng | ng | ng | ng | ng | ン | ㆭ | 응 | 黃色 | 黄色 |
| u | u | u | u | u | u | u | ウウ | ㄨ | ᅮ | 有無 | 有无 |
| ua | oa | ua | ua | ua | oa | ua | ヲア | ㄨㄚ | ᅪ | 歌曲 | 歌曲 |
| ue | oe | ue | ue | ue | oe | ue | ヲエ | ㄨㆤ | ᅰ | 講話 | 讲话 |
| uai | oai | uai | uai | uai | oai | uai | ヲァイ | ㄨㄞ | ᅫ | 奇怪 | 奇怪 |
| uan | oan | uan | uan | uan | oan | uan | ヲァヌ | ㄨㄢ | 왠 | 人員 | 人员 |
| ɨ | i | ir | ir | i | i | i | ウ̅ウ̅ | ㆨ | ᅵ | 豬肉 | 猪肉 |
| (i)ũ | (i)uⁿ | (i)unn | (i)unn/uN | n(i)u | v(i)u | (i)unn/uⁿ | ウウ | ㆫ | 윳 | 舀水 | 舀水 |

Consonants
| IPA | Pe̍h-ōe-jī | Tâi-lô | TLPA | BP | MLT | DT | Kana | Phonetic Symbols | Hangul | Example | |
| IPA | Pe̍h-ōe-jī | Tâi-lô | TLPA | BP | MLT | DT | Kana | Phonetic Symbols | Hangul | Traditional | Simplified |
|---|---|---|---|---|---|---|---|---|---|---|---|
| p | p | p | p | b | p | b | パア | ㄅ | ᄇ | 報紙 | 报纸 |
| b | b | b | b | bb | b | bh | バア | ㆠ | ᄈ | 閩南 | 闽南 |
| pʰ | ph | ph | ph | p | ph | p | パ̣ア | ㄆ | ᄑ | 普通 | 普通 |
| m | m | m | m | bb | m | m | マア | ㄇ | ᄆ | 請問 | 请问 |
| t | t | t | t | d | t | d | タア | ㄉ | ᄃ | 豬肉 | 猪肉 |
| tʰ | th | th | th | t | th | t | タ̣ア | ㄊ | ᄐ | 普通 | 普通 |
| n | n | n | n | n | n | n | ナア | ㄋ | ᄂ | 過年 | 过年 |
| nŋ | nng | nng | nng | lng | nng | nng | ヌン | ㄋㆭ | | 雞卵 | 鸡卵 |
| l | l | l | l | l | l | l | ラア | ㄌ | ᄅ | 樂觀 | 乐观 |
| k | k | k | k | g | k | g | カア | ㄍ | ᄀ | 價值 | 价值 |
| ɡ | g | g | g | gg | g | gh | ガア | ㆣ | ᄁ | 牛奶 | 牛奶 |
| kʰ | kh | kh | kh | k | kh | k | カ̣ア | ㄎ | ᄏ | 客廳 | 客厅 |
| h | h | h | h | h | h | h | ハア | ㄏ | ᄒ | 煩惱 | 烦恼 |
| tɕi | chi | tsi | zi | zi | ci | zi | チイ | ㄐ | ᄌ | 支持 | 支持 |
| ʑi | ji | ji | ji | li | ji | r | ジイ | ㆢ | ᄍ | 漢字 | 汉字 |
| tɕʰi | chhi | tshi | ci | ci | chi | ci | チ̣イ | ㄑ | ᄎ | 支持 | 支持 |
| ɕi | si | si | si | si | si | si | シイ | ㄒ | ㅅ | 是否 | 是否 |
| ts | ch | ts | z | z | z | z | サ̅ア | ㄗ | ᄌ | 報紙 | 报纸 |
| dz | j | j | j | l | j | r | ザア | ㆡ | ᄍ | 熱天 | 热天 |
| tsʰ | chh | tsh | c | c | zh | c | サ̣̅ア | ㄘ | ᄎ | 参加 | 参加 |
| s | s | s | s | s | s | s | サア | ㄙ | ㅅ | 司法 | 司法 |

Tones
| Tone name | IPA | Pe̍h-ōe-jī | Tâi-lô | TLPA | BP | MLT | DT | Kana (normal vowels) | Kana (nasal vowels) | Phonetic Symbols | Hangul | Example | |
| Tone name | IPA | Pe̍h-ōe-jī | Tâi-lô | TLPA | BP | MLT | DT | Kana (normal vowels) | Kana (nasal vowels) | Phonetic Symbols | Hangul | Traditional | Simplified |
|---|---|---|---|---|---|---|---|---|---|---|---|---|---|
| Yin level (陰平 1) | a˥ | a | a | a1 | ā | af | a | アア | アア | ㄚ | ᄋ | 公司 | 公司 |
| Yin rising (陰上 2) | a˥˧ | á | á | a2 | ǎ | ar | à | アア | アア | ㄚˋ | ᄅ | 報紙 | 报纸 |
| Yin departing (陰去 3) | a˨˩ | à | à | a3 | à | ax | â | アア | アア | ㄚ˪ | ᄂ | 興趣 | 兴趣 |
| Yin entering (陰入 4) | ap˩ at˩ ak˩ aʔ˩ | ap at ak ah | ah | a4 | āp āt āk āh | ab ad ag aq | āp āt āk āh | アㇷ゚ アッ アㇰ アァ | アㇷ゚ アッ アㇰ アァ | ㄚㆴ ㄚㆵ ㄚㆻ ㄚㆷ | ᄋ | 血壓 警察 中國 牛肉 | 血压 警察 中国 牛肉 |
| Yang level (陽平 5) | a˧˥ | â | â | a5 | ǎ | aa | ǎ | アア | アア | ㄚˊ | ᄉ | 人員 | 人员 |
| Yang rising (陽上 6) | | ǎ | ǎ | a6 | | aar | | | | | | 老爸 | 老爸 |
| Yang departing (陽去 7) | a˧ | ā | ā | a7 | â | a | ā | アア | アア | ㄚ˫ | ᄀ | 草地 | 草地 |
| Yang entering (陽入 8) | ap˥ at˥ ak˥ aʔ˥ | a̍p a̍t a̍k a̍h | a̍h | a8 | áp át ák áh | ap at ak ah | ap at ak ah | アㇷ゚ アッ アㇰ アァ | アㇷ゚ アッ アㇰ アァ | ㄚㆴ˙ ㄚㆵ˙ ㄚㆻ˙ ㄚㆷ˙ | ᄇ | 配合 法律 文學 歇熱 | 配合 法律 文学 歇热 |
| High rising (9) | a˥˥ | ă | a̋ | a9 | | | á | | | | ㅋ | 昨昏 | 昨昏 |
| Neutral (0) | a˨ | --a | --ah | a0 | | ~a | å | | | | | 入去 | 入去 |

- Note: The bopomofo extended characters in the zhuyin row require a UTF-8 font capable of displaying Unicode values 31A0–31B7 (ex. Code2000 true type font).
