= Modern Literal Taiwanese =

Orthography for Taiwanese in the Latin alphabet

Modern Literal Taiwanese (MLT), also known as Modern Taiwanese Language (MTL), is an orthography in the Latin alphabet for Taiwanese based on the Taiwanese Modern Spelling System (TMSS). MLT is able to use the ASCII character set plus ⟨ø⟩ to indicate the proper variation of pitch without any subsidiary scripts or diacritic symbols. The Phofsit Daibuun orthography is based on MLT, but substitutes ⟨oi⟩ for ⟨ø⟩.

== Phonology ==
Consonants
			Bilabial	Alveolar	Palato-alveolar	Velar	Glottal
Plosive	voiceless	unaspirated	p	t		k	' ([ʔ])
Plosive	voiceless	aspirated	ph	th		kh	
Plosive	voiced	unaspirated	b			g	
Affricate	voiceless	unaspirated		z	c		
Affricate	voiceless	aspirated		zh	ch		
Affricate	voiced	unaspirated			j		
Fricative	voiceless	unaspirated		s	s		
Fricative	voiceless	aspirated					h
Nasal	voiced	unaspiration	m/v	n		ng/v	
Lateral	voiced	unaspiration		l			

Vowels
	Front	Central	Back
Close	i		u
Close-mid	e		ø(2)
Mid		ø(1)	
Open-mid			o
Open	a		

== MLT Examples ==
=== Universal Declaration of Human Rights ===
MLT
Lienhabkog seakaix jinkhoaan soangieen

Tøe-id tiaau

Langlaang svilai zuxiuu, zai zungiaam kab khoanli siong itlut pengterng. Yn huoiuo lysexng kab liongsym, peng irnie hviati koanhe ee cviasiin hoxsiong tuiethai.

English
Universal Declaration of Human Rights

Article 1

All human beings are born free and equal in dignity and rights. They are endowed with reason and conscience and should act towards one another in a spirit of brotherhood.

=== MLT greetings ===
MLT	Translation	Remarks
Ciaqpar`bøe?	Greetings.	("Have you eaten?")
Sitlea!	Sorry for my impoliteness!	(lit., "Disrespect")
Goar thviaf bøo.	I don't understand.	(lit., "I hear not")
Piexnsor ti tøfui?	Where's the bathroom?	(lit., "bathroom is where?")
Loflat! Kafmsia!	Thank you
Ho taf `laq!	Cheers!	(lit., Let it [the cup/glass] be dry [empty]!)
Lie karm korng Engguo?	Do you speak English?
Siensvy korng, hagsefng tiaxmtiam thviaf.	The teacher talks, the students quietly listen.
Kin'afjit hit'ee zabor-gyn'ar laai goarn taw khvoax goar.	Today that girl came to my house to see me.
Kin'axm larn beq khix Suxliim Iaxchi'ar.	Tonight, we want to go to Shilin Night Market.

== The current system ==
The MLT alphabet adopts the Latin alphabet of 26 letters and the Scandinavian letter ø to express the basic sounds of Taiwanese:

a b c ch e f g h i j k kh l m n ng ø o p ph q r s t th u v y z zh

A MLT word, like each English word, can be formed by only one syllable or several syllables, with the two syllables being the most typical. Each syllable in MLT follows either one of the two underlying patterns (phonemes inside the bracket [] are optional):

- [Consonant] + [front nasal-sound] + vowel + [tone indicator]
- [Consonant] + vowel + [tone indicator] + [rear nasal-sound]

=== Consonants ===
- Bilabial: b, p, ph, m
- Alveolar: t, th, n, l
- Velar: g, k, kh, h
- Palatal: c, ch, s, j
- Dental: z, zh, s, j

=== Vowels ===
- Simple: a, i, u, e, o, ø, m, ng
- Compound: ai, au, ia, iu, iø, iau, ui, oa, oe, øe, oai
- Special High Tone (1st tone of i, u): y, w
- Special Shouting-Out Tone (2nd tone of ai, i, u, e, au): ae, ie, uo, ea, ao
- Front Nasal (indicator only, must be followed by a vowel): v
- Rear Nasal: m, n, ng

The nasals m, n, and ng can be appended to any of the vowels and some of the diphthongs. In addition, m and ng can function as independent syllables by themselves.

The stops h/q, k/g, p/b and t/d can appear as the last letter in a syllable, in which case they are pronounced with no audible release. (The finals h and q stand for a glottal stop of high and low tone, respectively.)

TMSS originally prescribed two special characters: the Greek letter ν and an o crossed by a backslash. These were replaced with the Latin letter v and number 0, respectively. Because mixing numbers into words is problematic for spell checkers, 0 was subsequently replaced by ø.

=== Tones ===
Not only consonants and vowel sounds, but also tones are represented by letters in the MLT system. Certain letters have no sound of their own and are merely used as tone indicators. Others letters represent vowels or vowel combinations which have certain tones. For example, "f", "r", and "x" are tone indicators only, and have no sound of their own in MLT. "Af" represents the "a" sound with a "high" tone, "ar" represents the same vowel sound but with a "shouting" tone, "ax" is the "a" sound with the low falling tone. A "y" or "w" indicates a high tone "i" and "u", respectively, while certain diphthongs, such as "ie" and "uo", are treated as "shouting" tones. The basic tone is represented by a normal, simple vowel (or voiced consonant—e.g. the nasals, "m" or "ng") without any special spelling modification.

==== High tone ====
A high tone is derived by raising the pitch of the voice to a level somewhat above the basic tone and is normally represented by adding the tone indicator "f" after a vowel, with the exception of the "i" and "u" sounds in a syllable. A high tone "i" and a high tone "u" are denoted by "y" and "w", respectively.

(The high tone would be near the top of one's normal speaking register. It may possibly be compared to the sort of high intonation used by English speakers when imitating a singer warming up with a high but level "mi, mi, mi, mi, mi".)

==== Shouting-out tone ====
A shouting-out (or just "shouting") tone is derived from shouting out a basic tone, and is normally represented by adding a tone indicator "r" after a vowel. When compound vowels are present in the shouting tone, however, sounds which by the normal rule would otherwise be written "air", "ir", "ur", "er", and "aur" are instead spelled "ae", "ie", "uo", "ea", and "ao", respectively. Exceptions occur when this rule overlaps with other rules. For example, the shouting tone of "lin" is written "lirn", not "lien" (interpreted as a compound vowel in basic tone) even though "lie" is the "shouting" counterpart to "li".

(Note that the so-called "shouting" tone is not literally a shout, but refers to the sort of quick, falling tone used, e.g., in shouting out a single-syllable word. It may be understood by English speakers by comparing the neutral tone in the normal pronunciation of the vowel in the name "Bob" with the quick, falling tone used when shouting the name (or saying the name quietly but with urgency), "Bob!" Similarly, saying "No!" achieves the same quick, downward tone in English.)

==== Low-falling tone ====
The low-falling tone is always marked by appending an "x" to the rearmost vowel. (Think of the low, almost guttural tone used in muttering a flat "Huh." or "Hmph." in English.)

==== Rising tone ====
The rising tone is denoted according to the following rules:

- Simple vowel: simply repeat the vowel. (E.g., "guu".)
- Compound vowel: repeat the last vowel letter except when it contains an “a”, then just repeat the “a”. (E.g., "zoaa".) In the case of ø, use øo rather than øø.

(Just as an urgent, quick "No!" can provide an example of the "shouting" tone in English, a questioning "No?" may represent the rising tone.)

==== Short tone ====
The low stopping tones are indicated by switching the final stops with the high stopping tones' as follows: h->q, t->d, p->b, k->g.

==== Examples ====
Examples for the seven tones:

- 1 (High): ty (豬, pig)
- 2 (Shouting-out): bea (馬, horse)
- 3 (Low-falling): pax (豹, leopard)
- 4 (Low stop): aq (鴨, duck)
- 5 (Rising): zoaa (蛇, snake)
- 7 (Basic): chviu (象, elephant)
- 8 (High stop): lok (鹿, deer)

=== Special Symbols ===
The apostrophe (', typewriter apostrophe) is used to demarcate syllables when there is ambiguity. A hyphen (-) is used to join two or more isolated words to make a new compound word with its own meaning. When a word contains a grave accent (`), all the syllables after this mark are accented in the low tone (low-falling for the long tones, and low-short for short tones).

=== Comparison chart ===
Vowels
IPA	Pe̍h-ōe-jī	Tâi-lô	TLPA	BP	MLT	DT	Kana	Phonetic Symbols	Hangul	Example	
IPA	Pe̍h-ōe-jī	Tâi-lô	TLPA	BP	MLT	DT	Kana	Phonetic Symbols	Hangul	Traditional	Simplified
a	a	a	a	a	a	a	アア	ㄚ	ᅡ	亞洲	亚洲
ap	ap	ap	ap	ap	ab/ap	āp/ap	アㇷ゚	ㄚㆴ	압	壓力	压力
at	at	at	at	at	ad/at	āt/at	アッ	ㄚㆵ	앋	警察	警察
ak	ak	ak	ak	ak	ag/ak	āk/ak	アㇰ	ㄚㆻ	악	沃水	沃水
aʔ	ah	ah	ah	ah	aq/ah	āh/ah	アァ	ㄚㆷ	앟	牛肉	牛肉
ã	aⁿ	ann	ann/aN	na	va	ann/aⁿ	アア	ㆩ	앗	三十	三十
ɔ	o͘	oo	oo	oo	o	o	オオ	ㆦ	ᅩ	烏色	乌色
ɔk	ok	ok	ok	ok	og/ok	ok	オㇰ	ㆦㆻ	옥	中國	中国
ɔ̃	oⁿ	onn	oonn/ooN	noo	vo	onn/oⁿ	オオ	ㆧ	옷	否	否
ə	o	o	o	o	ø	or	オ̅オ̅	ㄜ	ᅥ	澳洲	澳洲
o	o	o	o	o	ø	or	ヲヲ	ㄛ	ᅥ	澳洲	澳洲
e	e	e	e	e	e	e	エエ	ㆤ	ᅦ	下晡	下晡
ẽ	eⁿ	enn	enn/eN	ne	ve	enn/eⁿ	エエ	ㆥ	엣	青	青
i	i	i	i	i	i	i	イイ	ㄧ	ᅵ	醫學	医学
iɛn	ian	ian	ian	ian	ien	ian/en	イェヌ	ㄧㄢ	엔	鉛筆	铅笔
iəŋ	eng	ing	ing	ing	eng	ing	イェン	ㄧㄥ	영	英國	英国
iək	ek	ik	ik	ik	eg/ek	ik	イェㇰ	ㄧㆻ	역	翻譯	翻译
ĩ	iⁿ	inn	inn/iN	ni	vi	inn/iⁿ	イイ	ㆪ	잇	病院	病院
ai	ai	ai	ai	ai	ai	ai	アイ	ㄞ	ᅢ	愛情	爱情
aĩ	aiⁿ	ainn	ainn/aiN	nai	vai	ainn/aiⁿ	アイ	ㆮ	앳	載	载
au	au	au	au	au	au	au	アウ	ㆯ	알	歐洲	欧洲
am	am	am	am	am	am	am	アム	ㆰ	암	暗時	暗时
ɔm	om	om	om	om	om	om	オム	ㆱ	옴	參	参
m̩	m	m	m	m	m	m	ム	ㆬ	음	阿姆	阿姆
ɔŋ	ong	ong	ong	ong	ong	ong	オン	ㆲ	옹	王梨	王梨
ŋ̍	ng	ng	ng	ng	ng	ng	ン	ㆭ	응	黃色	黄色
u	u	u	u	u	u	u	ウウ	ㄨ	ᅮ	有無	有无
ua	oa	ua	ua	ua	oa	ua	ヲア	ㄨㄚ	ᅪ	歌曲	歌曲
ue	oe	ue	ue	ue	oe	ue	ヲエ	ㄨㆤ	ᅰ	講話	讲话
uai	oai	uai	uai	uai	oai	uai	ヲァイ	ㄨㄞ	ᅫ	奇怪	奇怪
uan	oan	uan	uan	uan	oan	uan	ヲァヌ	ㄨㄢ	왠	人員	人员
ɨ	i	ir	ir	i	i	i	ウ̅ウ̅	ㆨ	ᅵ	豬肉	猪肉
(i)ũ	(i)uⁿ	(i)unn	(i)unn/uN	n(i)u	v(i)u	(i)unn/uⁿ	ウウ	ㆫ	윳	舀水	舀水

Consonants
IPA	Pe̍h-ōe-jī	Tâi-lô	TLPA	BP	MLT	DT	Kana	Phonetic Symbols	Hangul	Example	
IPA	Pe̍h-ōe-jī	Tâi-lô	TLPA	BP	MLT	DT	Kana	Phonetic Symbols	Hangul	Traditional	Simplified
p	p	p	p	b	p	b	パア	ㄅ	ᄇ	報紙	报纸
b	b	b	b	bb	b	bh	バア	ㆠ	ᄈ	閩南	闽南
pʰ	ph	ph	ph	p	ph	p	パ̣ア	ㄆ	ᄑ	普通	普通
m	m	m	m	bbn	m	m	マア	ㄇ	ᄆ	請問	请问
t	t	t	t	d	t	d	タア	ㄉ	ᄃ	豬肉	猪肉
tʰ	th	th	th	t	th	t	タ̣ア	ㄊ	ᄐ	普通	普通
n	n	n	n	ln	n	n	ナア	ㄋ	ᄂ	過年	过年
nŋ	nng	nng	nng	lng	nng	nng	ヌン	ㄋㆭ		雞卵	鸡卵
l	l	l	l	l	l	l	ラア	ㄌ	ᄅ	樂觀	乐观
k	k	k	k	g	k	g	カア	ㄍ	ᄀ	價值	价值
ɡ	g	g	g	gg	g	gh	ガア	ㆣ	ᄁ	牛奶	牛奶
kʰ	kh	kh	kh	k	kh	k	カ̣ア	ㄎ	ᄏ	客廳	客厅
h	h	h	h	h	h	h	ハア	ㄏ	ᄒ	煩惱	烦恼
tɕi	chi	tsi	zi	zi	ci	zi	チイ	ㄐ	ᄌ	支持	支持
dʑi	ji	ji	ji	li	ji	r	ジイ	ㆢ	ᄍ	漢字	汉字
tɕʰi	chhi	tshi	ci	ci	chi	ci	チ̣イ	ㄑ	ᄎ	支持	支持
ɕi	si	si	si	si	si	si	シイ	ㄒ	ㅅ	是否	是否
ts	ch	ts	z	z	z	z	サ̅ア	ㄗ	ᄌ	報紙	报纸
dz	j	j	j	l	j	r	ザア	ㆡ	ᄍ	熱天	热天
tsʰ	chh	tsh	c	c	zh	c	サ̣̅ア	ㄘ	ᄎ	参加	参加
s	s	s	s	s	s	s	サア	ㄙ	ㅅ	司法	司法

Tones
Tone name	IPA	Pe̍h-ōe-jī	Tâi-lô	TLPA	BP	MLT	DT	Kana (normal vowels)	Kana (nasal vowels)	Phonetic Symbols	Hangul	Example	
Tone name	IPA	Pe̍h-ōe-jī	Tâi-lô	TLPA	BP	MLT	DT	Kana (normal vowels)	Kana (nasal vowels)	Phonetic Symbols	Hangul	Traditional	Simplified
Yin level (陰平 1)	a˥	a	a	a1	ā	af	a	アア	アア	ㄚ	ᄋ	公司	公司
Yin rising (陰上 2)	a˥˧	á	á	a2	ǎ	ar	à	アア	アア	ㄚˋ	ᄅ	報紙	报纸
Yin departing (陰去 3)	a˨˩	à	à	a3	à	ax	â	アア	アア	ㄚ˪	ᄂ	興趣	兴趣
Yin entering (陰入 4)	ap˩ at˩ ak˩ aʔ˩	ap at ak ah	ah	a4	āp āt āk āh	ab ad ag aq	āp āt āk āh	アㇷ゚ アッ アㇰ アァ	アㇷ゚ アッ アㇰ アァ	ㄚㆴ ㄚㆵ ㄚㆻ ㄚㆷ	ᄋ	血壓 警察 中國 牛肉	血压 警察 中国 牛肉
Yang level (陽平 5)	a˧˥	â	â	a5	ǎ	aa	ǎ	アア	アア	ㄚˊ	ᄉ	人員	人员
Yang rising (陽上 6)		ǎ	ǎ	a6		aar						老爸	老爸
Yang departing (陽去 7)	a˧	ā	ā	a7	â	a	ā	アア	アア	ㄚ˫	ᄀ	草地	草地
Yang entering (陽入 8)	ap˥ at˥ ak˥ aʔ˥	a̍p a̍t a̍k a̍h	a̍h	a8	áp át ák áh	ap at ak ah	ap at ak ah	アㇷ゚ アッ アㇰ アァ	アㇷ゚ アッ アㇰ アァ	ㄚㆴ˙ ㄚㆵ˙ ㄚㆻ˙ ㄚㆷ˙	ᄇ	配合 法律 文學 歇熱	配合 法律 文学 歇热
High rising (9)	a˥˥	ă	a̋	a9			á				ㅋ	昨昏	昨昏
Neutral (0)	a˨	--a	--ah	a0		~a	å					入去	入去

- Note: The bopomofo extended characters in the zhuyin row require a UTF-8 font capable of displaying Unicode values 31A0–31B7 (ex. Code2000 true type font).

== History of MLT ==
The Pe̍h-ōe-jī (POJ) system, introduced in the 19th century, provides a basis for phonetic transcription of the Taiwanese language using the Latin alphabet. It initially developed a significant user base, but the number of users declined during the period of Japanese colonization of Taiwan, when the use of POJ was suppressed in preference to katakana, and also during the era of martial law, during which Mandarin Chinese was promoted.

Prof. Liim Keahioong, formerly of the National Cheng Kung University in Tainan, Taiwan, pioneered the Taiwanese Modern Spelling System (TMSS) in 1943, with the intent to avoid the diacritical markings of POJ as well as the cumbersome difficulty of inputting Chinese characters with the available technology. TMSS served as the basis for Modern Literal Taiwanese (MLT). Other variants of MLT exist, such as Phofsit Daibuun and Simplified MLT (SMLT).
