= Washington DC Taiwanese School =

Taiwanese American Cultural and Educational Non-Profit Organization

Coordinates: 39.03161°N 77.17209°W

WDCTS
- Washington DC Taiwanese School
- 華府台灣學校; Hoahuo Taioaan Haghau; Hua-fu Taiwan Hsueh-hsiao
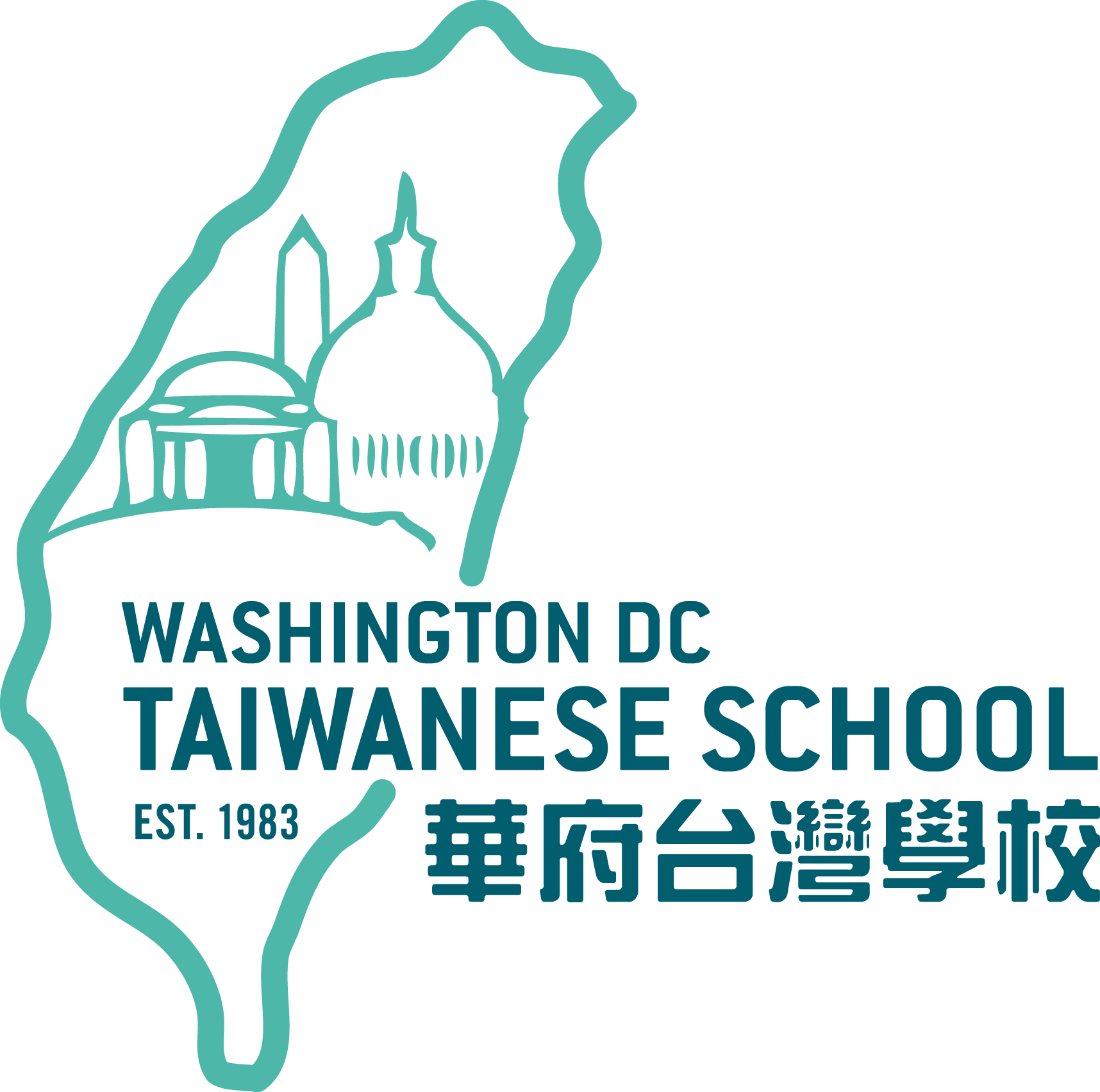
- Washington DC Taiwanese School logo
- Formation: 1983
- Type: Nonprofit
- Location: United States
- Official language: English, Modern Taiwanese Language, Mandarin
- Parent organization: Taiwanese Youth Arts Foundation (TYAF)
- Website: https://wdcts.org/

Washington DC Taiwanese School (Chinese: 華府台灣學校; Modern Taiwanese Language: Hoahuo Taioaan Haghau; Wade–Giles: Hua-fu Taiwan Hsueh-hsiao; Pinyin: Huafu Taiwan Xuexiao) is a Taiwanese-American non-profit organization that was established in 1983. The school offers classes on Sunday afternoons at Cabin John Middle School in Potomac, Maryland, with a curriculum focused on language learning, cultural immersion, and community engagement.

== Accomplishments and Community Impact ==
Washington DC Taiwanese School (WDCTS) has been recognized for preserving Taiwanese heritage overseas and its teaching and management of the Taiwan Centers for Mandarin Learning by the Taiwanese government. The school commemorates significant events such as 2-28 Memorial Day and Taiwan Human Rights Day, and hosts various cultural celebrations and events, including the Lunar New Year, Mother's Day, Dragon Boat Festival, Ancestors Day, Mid-Autumn Festival, and Winter Solstice celebration

The school participates in local communities and events, such as the Rockville Bubble Tea Festival and the Lantern Festival. In the response to the COVID-19 pandemic, the organization delivered meals to medical personnel at hospitals in Maryland, D.C., and Virginia.

The school trains teachers and showcase its students accomplishments. It emphasizes preserving languages by promoting reading and writing skills. The school also hosts events, such as calligraphy competitions.

== Classes and Extracurricular Activities ==
The Washington DC Taiwanese School provides Taiwanese, traditional Mandarin, and Japanese classes at various levels for both children and adults. Extracurricular activities are offered for children and adult to participate include chess club, TaiChi, dance, yoga, basketball, GuZheng, percussion, and calligraphy.

== WDCTS Historic Background ==
In 1983, the Washington DC Taiwanese Language School, later renamed Washington DC Taiwanese School, was founded by a group of Taiwanese Americans. It was established with the aim of preserving and promoting Taiwanese heritage, languages, and lifestyles for future generations while also inviting the American public to experience and understand this unique culture.[citation] Initially, the school's programs included "literary (文), martial (武), and recreational (康樂)" activities.

== Dragon Boat Teams ==
Washington DC Taiwanese School has both an adult and a youth dragon boat team that compete annually in the DC Dragon Boat Festival. The adult team, Humpbacks, was formed in 2007, and the youth team, Belugas, was formed in 2019.

== Taiwanese Youth Arts Foundation (TYAF) ==
The Taiwanese Youth Arts Foundation (TYAF) (Chinese: 台灣人青少年才藝基金會; Modern Taiwanese Language: Taioaan-laang Zhengsiaolieen Zaige Kikimhoe; Wade–Giles: Taiwan Jen Ching-shao-nien Tsai-i Chi-chun Hui; Pinyin: Taiwan Ren QingShaoNian CaiYi JiJin Hui) is a non-profit organization established in 1982 in the Washington DC area by local Taiwanese-American individuals. Its mission statement is to provide an environment and opportunities for young Taiwanese Americans to learn about and promote Taiwanese culture.

TYAF is the organization that operates WDCTS. TYAF sponsors various cultural and charitable activities, including the Outstanding Taiwanese American Youth Awards and annual WDCTS events such as their Lunar New Year Party, Taiwanese American Heritage Week, Mother's Day celebration, and Winter Solstice festival. It also sponsors cultural activities such as Taiwanese puppet shows, and organizes charitable activities such as standing up against AAPI hate, and raising funds for disaster relief with other local Taiwanese American organizations.

=== TYAF Historic Background ===
The foundation was used by the founders to accept donations from fellow Taiwanese Americans and rent classrooms to hold regular activities.

=== Activities ===
TYAF and the Taiwanese Association of America (TAA) have jointly organized "Taiwan Night" every year since 1985. The event includes the presentation of the Outstanding Youth Award to recognize young talent, as well as special community service awards for exceptional contributions to the Taiwanese community. In 2007, TYAF became a certifying organization for the President's Volunteer Service Award, which it now presents to recognize service to the Taiwanese community.

=== Scholarships ===
TYAF provides scholarships to support education and promote Taiwanese culture, language, and heritage. The foundation offers three scholarships that recognize and reward excellence among youth in Taiwanese language and culture.

=== Outstanding Service Award ===
The Outstanding Service Award is presented by TYAF to community leaders who have shown exceptional dedication to serving their communities. Recipients are chosen based on their commitment to making a positive impact on the lives of those around them.
