= PSDB (disambiguation) =

PSDB may refer to:

- Brazilian Social Democracy Party
- Always Forward (Brazil) (called the PSDB Cidadania Federation or Federação PSDB Cidadania)
- Phofsit Daibuun
- PSDB United
