= Ang Ui-jin =

Taiwanese linguist

- 洪惟仁
- Born: 16 June 1946 (age 79); Xigang, Chiayi County, Taiwan
- Education: Chinese Culture University (BA); National Taiwan Normal University (MA); National Tsing Hua University (PhD)
- Website: http://www.uijin.idv.tw/ (Chinese)

Ang Ui-jin (Chinese: 洪惟仁; Pe̍h-ōe-jī: Âng Ûi-jîn; pinyin: Hóng Wéirén; born 16 June 1946) is a Taiwanese linguist. He was the chief architect of the Taiwanese Language Phonetic Alphabet and remains a scholar in the progressive reform and development of Taiwanese Hokkien.

== Early life and education ==
Ang was born in Xigang District, Tainan, on June 16, 1946. He graduated from Chinese Culture University with a bachelor's degree in Chinese in 1969 and from National Taiwan Normal University with a master's degree in Chinese in 1973. In September 1973, he was persecuted during the White Terror and sentenced to life imprisonment for "crimes of rebellion" (預備叛亂罪). Later, he was granted amnesty and released from prison after 6 years and 8 months.

In 2003, Ang earned his Ph.D. in linguistics from National Tsing Hua University. His doctoral dissertation was titled, "The Motivation and Direction of Sound Change: On the Competition of Minnan Dialects Chang-chou and Chüan-chou and the Emergence of General Taiwanese" (Chinese: 音變的動機與方向：漳泉競爭與台灣普通腔的形成).

== Career ==
His research expertises include Min Nan phonetics, dialectology, Chinese phonology, and the sociology of language. He was once a full-time associate professor at Yuan Ze University. He became dean and full-time professor at the Department of Taiwanese Languages and Literature at National Taichung University in 2006.

He was the 6th President of the Taiwan Linguistics Society (台灣語文學會). In 1992 he founded Taiwanese Hokkien magazine Digest of the Taiwanese language (台語文摘).

Ang Ui-jin's oldest son is Mark Ang, the founder of the Formosa Festival of International Filmmaker Awards (FFIFA) and an award-winning director in Taiwan.

== Bibliography (Chinese) ==
- 中國訓詁學之理論基礎 [The theoretical foundation of Chinese Exegesis]. National Taiwan Normal University. 1971.
- 台灣河佬話聲調研究 [Tone research on Taiwanese Hokkien]. Taipei: 自立晚報 Independence Evening Post. 1985.
- 台灣禮俗語典 [Dictionary of Taiwanese etiquette]. Taipei: 自立晚報 [Independence Evening Post]. 1986.
- 台灣方言之旅 [Insight into Taiwanese dialects]. Taipei: 前衛出版社 [Qianwei Publisher]. 1992.
- 台灣語言危機 [Linguistic danger of Taiwanese languages]. Taipei: 前衛出版社 [Qianwei Publisher]. 1992.
- 『彙音妙悟』與古代泉州音 [Phonology of Quanzhou speech]. Taipei: 國立中央圖書館台灣分館 [National Central Library Branch]. 1996.
- 台灣話音韻入門──附台灣十五音字母 [Introduction to Taiwanese phonology]. Taipei: 國立復興劇藝實驗學校 [National Art Revival School]. 1996.
- 台灣文獻書目解題：語言類 [Taiwanese explanation on titles of sources: linguistics]. Taipei: 國立中央圖書館台灣分館 [Taipei National Art Revival School]. 1996.
- 高雄縣閩南語方言 [Kaohsiung county's Minnan Dialect]. 高雄縣政府 [Kaohsiung County Government]. 1997.
- 新竹市志‧住民志‧語言篇 [Hsinchu city novel: dweller's stories: Language chapter]. 新竹市政府 [Hsinchu City Government]. 1997.

== See also ==
- Taiwanese Romanization System
- Pe̍h-ōe-jī
- Taiwanese Hokkien
- Hokkien
- Taiwanese Hangul
