= Ewellic alphabet =

Phonemic alphabet for English and other languages

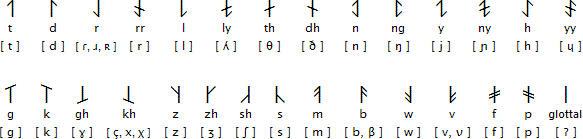
Ewellic alphabet - consonants with phonetic transcription

The Ewellic script (pronounced yoo-WELL-ik) was invented by Doug Ewell in 1980 as a way to represent the pronunciation of English and other languages without the precision of the International Phonetic Alphabet (IPA).
