= Taiwanese Phonetic Symbols =

Phonetic script for Taiwanese languages

- Script type: Semisyllabary (letters for onsets and rimes; diacritics for tones)
- Creator: Chu Chao-hsiang, Taiwan NLC
- Period: 1946 to the present, used as ruby characters in Taiwan
- Languages: Taiwanese Hokkien, Hakka

Related scripts
- Parent systems: Oracle bone script: Seal script; Clerical script; Mandarin Phonetic Symbols; Taiwanese Phonetic Symbols
- Sister systems: Simplified Chinese, Kanji, Hanja, Chữ Nôm, Khitan large script, Khitan small script

ISO 15924
- ISO 15924: Bopo (285), Bopomofo

Unicode
- Unicode alias: Bopomofo
- Unicode range: U+3100–U+312F, U+31A0–U+31BF

Taiwanese Phonetic Symbols
- Traditional Chinese: 臺語方音符號
- Simplified Chinese: 台语方音符号
Transcriptions
Standard Mandarin
- Hanyu Pinyin: Táiyǔ Fāngyīn Fúhào
- Bopomofo: ㄊㄞˊ ㄩˇ ㄈㄤ ㄧㄣ ㄈㄨˊ ㄏㄠˋ
- Gwoyeu Romatzyh: Tairyeu Fang'yin Fwuhaw
- Wade–Giles: T'ai^{2}-yü^{3} Fang^{1}-yin^{1} Fu^{2}-hao^{4}
- Tongyong Pinyin: Tái-yǔ Fang-yin Fú-hào
- MPS2: Táiyǔ Fāngyīn Fúhàu
- IPA: [tʰǎɪ.ỳ fáŋ.ín fǔ.xâʊ]
Hakka
- Romanization: Thòi-ngî Fông-yîm Fù-ho
Southern Min
- Hokkien POJ: Tâi-gí Hong-im Hû-hō
- Tâi-lô: Tâi-gí Hong-im Hû-hō

Taiwanese Phonetic Symbols

Taiwanese Phonetic Symbols (Chinese: 臺語方音符號; TPS: ㄉㄞˊ ㆣ丨ˋ ㄏㆲ 丨ㆬ ㄏㄨˊ ㄏㄜ˫) constitute a system of phonetic notation for the transcription of Taiwanese languages, especially Taiwanese Hokkien. The system was designed by Professor Chu Chao-hsiang, a member of the National Languages Committee in Taiwan, in 1946. The system is derived from Mandarin Phonetic Symbols by creating additional symbols for the sounds that do not appear in Mandarin phonology. It is one of the phonetic notation systems officially promoted by Taiwan's Ministry of Education.

== Symbols ==
There are 49 symbols used in standard Taiwanese Hokkien. Of these 49 symbols, 26 are from the original Mandarin Phonetic Symbols, while 23 are additional, created for Taiwanese languages.

Initial symbols (21)
ㄅ	ㆠ	ㄆ	ㄇ	ㄉ	ㄊ	ㄋ	ㄌ	ㄍ	ㆣ	ㄎ	ㄫ	ㄏ	ㄐ	ㆢ	ㄑ	ㄒ	ㄗ	ㆡ	ㄘ	ㄙ			
[p]	[b]	[pʰ]	[m]	[t]	[tʰ]	[n]	[l]	[k]	[ɡ]	[kʰ]	[ŋ]	[h]	[t͡ɕ]	[d͡ʑ]	[t͡ɕʰ]	[ɕ]	[t͡s]	[d͡z]	[t͡sʰ]	[s]			
Final symbols (24)
ㄚ	ㆩ	ㆦ	ㆧ	ㄜ	ㆤ	ㆥ	ㄞ	ㆮ	ㄠ	ㆯ	ㆰ	ㆱ	ㆬ	ㄢ	ㄣ	ㄤ	ㆲ	ㄥ	ㆭ	ㄧ	ㆪ	ㄨ	ㆫ
[a]	[ã]	[ɔ]	[ɔ̃]	[ə]	[e]	[ẽ]	[ai]	[ãĩ]	[ɑu]	[ɑ̃ũ]	[am]	[ɔm]	[m̩]	[an]	[ən]	[aŋ]	[ɔŋ]	[əŋ]	[ŋ̍]	[i]	[ĩ]	[u]	[ũ]

- The symbols in blue do not exist in Mandarin phonology.
- Four voiceless consonants ㄅ, ㄉ, ㄍ, ㄏ may be written in small form to represent the unreleased coda, as in ㆴ [p̚], ㆵ [t̚], ㆶ [k̚], ㆷ [ʔ]. However, due to technical errors, the coda symbol for ㄍ was mistaken as ㄎ. Unicode encoded ㆻ (31BB) in its version 13.0, and added a note under ㆶ (31B6), indicating 31BB is preferred.
- Some extra symbols are used in other Taiwanese dialects: ㄬ [ɲ], ㄛ [o], ㄝ [ɛ], ㆨ [ɨ].

=== Images ===
Images below are a collection of Taiwanese Phonetic Symbols:

- For Taiwanese Hokkien and Taiwanese Hakka:,,,,,,,
- For Taiwanese Hakka only:,
- For Taiwanese Hokkien only:,,,,,,,,,,,,,,,,
- For Mandarin only:,,,
- For Taiwanese Hakka and Mandarin:,,,,
- represents [x] in Mandarin and [h] in Taiwanese Hokkien and Taiwanese Hakka.
- / represent [ɛ]/[e] in Taiwanese Hokkien respectively, but they represent [e]/[ɛ] in Taiwanese Hakka.
- Vowel [ɨ] is represented with in Hokkien and in Hakka.

== Etymology ==
Initials
Group	Symbol	IPA	POJ	TL	BP	Notes	Example
Bilabial	ㄅ	[p]	p		b	Same value as in Mandarin	邊 (ㄅㄧㄢ pian)
Bilabial	ㆠ	[b]	b		bb	Derived from ㄅ as a voiced counterpart	文 (ㆠㄨㄣˊ bûn)
Bilabial	ㄆ	[pʰ]	ph		p	Same value as in Mandarin	波 (ㄆㄜ pho)
Bilabial	ㄇ	[m]	m		bbn	Same value as in Mandarin	毛 (ㄇㆦˊ môo)
Alveolar	ㄉ	[t]	t		d	Same value as in Mandarin	地 (ㄉㆤ˫ tē)
Alveolar	ㄊ	[tʰ]	th		t	Same value as in Mandarin	他 (ㄊㆩ thann)
Alveolar	ㄋ	[n]	n		ln	Same value as in Mandarin	耐 (ㄋㄞ˫ nāi)
Alveolar	ㄌ	[l]	l			Same value as in Mandarin	柳 (ㄌㄧㄨˋ liú)
Velar	ㄍ	[k]	k		g	Same value as in Mandarin	求 (ㄍㄧㄨˊ kiû)
Velar	ㆣ	[ɡ]	g		gg	Derived from ㄍ as a voiced counterpart	語 (ㆣㄧˋ gí)
Velar	ㄎ	[kʰ]	kh		k	Same value as in Mandarin	去 (ㄎㄧ˪ khì)
Velar	ㄫ	[ŋ]	ng		ggn	Once appeared in old Mandarin	雅 (ㄫㄚˋ ngá)
Glottal	ㄏ	[h]	h			Different value to Mandarin, in Mandarin [x]	喜 (ㄏㄧˋ hí)
Alveolo- palatal	ㄐ	[t͡ɕ]	chi	tsi	zi	Same value as in Mandarin	尖 (ㄐㄧㆰ tsiam)
Alveolo- palatal	ㆢ	[d͡ʑ]	ji		zzi	Derived from ㄐ as a voiced counterpart	入 (ㆢㄧㆴ. ji̍p)
Alveolo- palatal	ㄑ	[t͡ɕʰ]	chhi	tshi	ci	Same value as in Mandarin	手 (ㄑㄧㄨˋ tshiú)
Alveolo- palatal	ㄒ	[ɕ]	si			Same value as in Mandarin	寫 (ㄒㄧㄚˋ siá)
Alveolar	ㄗ	[t͡s]	ch	ts	z	Same value as in Mandarin	曾 (ㄗㄢ tsan)
Alveolar	ㆡ	[d͡z]	j		zz	Derived from ㄗ as a voiced counterpart	熱 (ㆡㄨㄚㆷ. jua̍h)
Alveolar	ㄘ	[t͡sʰ]	chh	tsh	c	Same value as in Mandarin	出 (ㄘㄨㆵ tshut)
Alveolar	ㄙ	[s]	s			Same value as in Mandarin	衫 (ㄙㆩ sann)
Rhymes and medials
Group	Symbol	IPA	POJ	TL	BP	Notes	Example
Vowels	ㄚ	[a]	a			Same value as in Mandarin	查 (ㄘㄚˊ tshâ)
Vowels	ㆩ	[ã]	aⁿ	ann	na	Derived from ㄚ as a nasalized counterpart	衫 (ㄙㆩ sann)
Vowels	ㆦ	[ɔ]	o͘	oo		New symbol solely used in Taiwanese, derived from ㄛ	烏 (ㆦ oo)
Vowels	ㆧ	[ɔ̃]	oⁿ	onn	noo	Derived from ㆦ as a nasalized counterpart	唔 (ㆧ onn)
Vowels	ㄜ	[ə]	o			Different value from Mandarin, in Mandarin [ɰɤ]. May written as ㄛ and pronounced [o] in some dialects	高 (ㄍㄜ ko)
Vowels	ㆤ	[e]	e			New symbol solely used in Taiwanese	禮 (ㄌㆤˋ lé)
Vowels	ㆥ	[ẽ]	eⁿ	enn	ne	Derived from ㆤ as a nasalized counterpart	生 (ㄙㆥ senn)
Diph- thongs	ㄞ	[ai]	ai			Same value as in Mandarin	愛 (ㄞ˪ ài)
Diph- thongs	ㆮ	[ãĩ]	aiⁿ	ainn	nai	Derived from ㄞ as a nasalized counterpart	歹 (ㄆㆮˋ pháinn)
Diph- thongs	ㄠ	[ɑu]	au		ao	Same value as in Mandarin	𠢕 (ㆣㄠˊ gâu)
Diph- thongs	ㆯ	[ɑ̃ũ]	auⁿ	aunn	nao	Derived from ㄠ as a nasalized counterpart, rarely used	澩 (ㄏㆯㆷ. ha̍unnh)
M finals	ㆰ	[am]	am			A combination of ㄚ and ㄇ	暗 (ㆰ˪ àm)
M finals	ㆱ	[ɔm]	om			A combination of ㆦ and ㄇ, rarely used	掩 (ㆱ om)
M finals	ㆬ	[m̩]	m			Derived from ㄇ. May be used as a final bilabial nasal or a syllabic consonant	姆 (ㆬˋ ḿ)
N finals	ㄢ	[an]	an			Same value as in Mandarin	安 (ㄢ an)
N finals	ㄣ	[n]	-n			Only used in the finals ㄧㄣ, ㄨㄣ. ㄧㄣ has same value as in Mandarin. ㄨㄣ is pronounced as [un] unlike [wən] in Mandarin	因 (ㄧㄣ in)
Ng finals	ㄤ	[aŋ]	ang			Same value as in Mandarin	人 (ㄌㄤˊ lâng)
Ng finals	ㆲ	[ɔŋ]	ong			New symbol solely used in Taiwanese	王 (ㆲˊ ông)
Ng finals	ㄥ	[əŋ]	-ng			Only used in the final ㄧㄥ.	英 (ㄧㄥ ing)
Ng finals	ㆭ	[ŋ̍]	ng			Derived from ㄫ. May be used as a final velar nasal or a syllabic consonant	酸 (ㄙㆭ sng)
Medial vowels	ㄧ	[i]	i			Same value as in Mandarin	衣 (ㄧ i)
Medial vowels	ㆪ	[ĩ]	iⁿ	inn	ni	Derived from ㄧ as a nasalized counterpart	圓 (ㆪˊ înn)
Medial vowels	ㄨ	[u]	u/o (Note: Written as ⟨o⟩ when followed by an ⟨a⟩ (ㄚ) or ⟨e⟩ (ㆤ), as in the finals ⟨oa⟩, ⟨oe⟩ and ⟨oai⟩ (ㄨㄞ). Written as ⟨u⟩ elsewhere.)	u		Same value as in Mandarin	污 (ㄨ u)
Medial vowels	ㆫ	[ũ]	uⁿ	unn	nu	Derived from ㄨ as a nasalized counterpart. Only used in the final ㄧㆫ [ĩũ]	張 (ㄉㄧㆫ tiunn)

== Other features ==
=== Combined rhymes ===
Vowel(s)	Open syllables		Nasal			Plosive				
Vowel(s)	Open syllables		[m]	[n]	[ŋ]	[p̚]	[t̚]	[k̚]	[ʔ]	
[a]	ㄚ	ㆩ	ㆰ	ㄢ	ㄤ	ㄚㆴ	ㄚㆵ	ㄚㆻ	ㄚㆷ	ㆩㆷ
[ai]	ㄞ	ㆮ							ㄞㆷ	ㆮㆷ
[au]	ㄠ								ㄠㆷ	
[e]	ㆤ	ㆥ							ㆤㆷ	ㆥㆷ
[i]	ㄧ	ㆪ	ㄧㆬ	ㄧㄣ	ㄧㄥ	ㄧㆴ	ㄧㆵ	ㄧㆻ	ㄧㆷ	ㆪㆷ
[ia]	ㄧㄚ	ㄧㆩ	ㄧㆰ	ㄧㄢ	ㄧㄤ	ㄧㄚㆴ	ㄧㄚㆵ	ㄧㄚㆻ	ㄧㄚㆷ	ㄧㆩㆷ
[iau]	ㄧㄠ	ㄧㆯ							ㄧㄠㆷ	
[iə]	ㄧㄜ								ㄧㄜㆷ	
[iɔ]					ㄧㆲ			ㄧㆦㆻ		
[iu]	ㄧㄨ	ㄧㆫ							ㄧㄨㆷ	ㄧㆫㆷ

Vowel(s)	Open syllables		Nasal			Plosive				
Vowel(s)	Open syllables		[m]	[n]	[ŋ]	[p̚]	[t̚]	[k̚]	[ʔ]	
[ə]	ㄜ								ㄜㆷ	
[ɔ]	ㆦ	ㆧ	ㆱ		ㆲ	ㆦㆴ		ㆦㆻ	ㆦㆷ	ㆧㆷ
[u]	ㄨ			ㄨㄣ			ㄨㆵ		ㄨㆷ	
[ua]	ㄨㄚ	ㄨㆩ		ㄨㄢ			ㄨㄚㆵ		ㄨㄚㆷ	
[uai]	ㄨㄞ	ㄨㆮ								
[ue]	ㄨㆤ								ㄨㆤㆷ	
[ui]	ㄨㄧ									
[m̩]	ㆬ		－						ㆬㆷ	
[ŋ̍]	ㆭ		－						ㆭㆷ	

=== Tones ===
Tone No.	1	2(6)	3	4	5	7	8
Name	陰平	陰上	陰去	陰入	陽平	陽去	陽入
Name	im-piânn	im-siōng	im-khì	im-ji̍p	iông-piânn	iông-khì	iông-ji̍p
Symbol	none	ˋ	˪	ㄅ, ㄉ, ㄍ, ㄏ	ˊ	˫	ㄅ̇, ㄉ̇, ㄍ̇, ㄏ̇
Pitch	˥	˥˩	˧˩	˧ʔ	˨˦	˧	˥ʔ
Pitch	44	51	31	3ʔ	24	33	5ʔ
Example	ㄉㆲ (東)	ㄉㆲˋ (黨)	ㄉㆲ˪ (棟)	ㄉㆦㆻ (督)	ㄉㆲˊ (同)	ㄉㆲ˫ (洞)	ㄉㆦㆻ̇ (毒)

== Example ==
Audio File:	Sound file
Taiwanese Phonetic Symbols:	ㄒㄧㄢ ㄒㆪ ㄍㆲˋ, ㄏㄚㆻ̇ ㄒㄧㄥ ㄉㄧㆰ˫ ㄉㄧㆰ˫ ㄊㄧㆩ
IPA:	[ ɕɪɛn˧ ɕĩ˥ kɔŋ˥˩ hak̚˧ ɕiəŋ˥ tɪam˧ tɪam˧ tʰĩã˥ ]
Pe̍h-ōe-jī:	Sian-siⁿ kóng, ha̍k-seng tiām-tiām thiaⁿ.
Tâi-lô:	Sian-sinn kóng, ha̍k-sing tiām-tiām thiann.
Traditional Chinese:	先生講、學生恬恬聽。
Hanyu Pinyin:	Xiān shēng jiǎng, xué shēng tián tián tīng.
Translation:	A teacher is speaking. Students are quietly listening.

Note: 恬恬 is Taiwanese Hokkien (台灣話). Synonyms would be 安靜 or 靜靜. 先生, in this context, means "teacher".

== Unicode support ==
The Mandarin Phonetic Symbols were added to the Unicode Standard in October 1991 with the release of version 1.0. The Unicode block for Mandarin Phonetic Symbols is U+3100 ... U+312F.

Bopomofo^{[1]}^{[2]} Official Unicode Consortium code chart (PDF)
	0	1	2	3	4	5	6	7	8	9	A	B	C	D	E	F
U+310x						ㄅ	ㄆ	ㄇ	ㄈ	ㄉ	ㄊ	ㄋ	ㄌ	ㄍ	ㄎ	ㄏ
U+311x	ㄐ	ㄑ	ㄒ	ㄓ	ㄔ	ㄕ	ㄖ	ㄗ	ㄘ	ㄙ	ㄚ	ㄛ	ㄜ	ㄝ	ㄞ	ㄟ
U+312x	ㄠ	ㄡ	ㄢ	ㄣ	ㄤ	ㄥ	ㄦ	ㄧ	ㄨ	ㄩ	ㄪ	ㄫ	ㄬ	ㄭ	ㄮ	ㄯ
Notes: 1. As of Unicode version 17.0; 2. Grey areas indicate non-assigned code points

The extended phonetic symbols were added to the Unicode Standard in September 1999 with the release of version 3.0. The Unicode block for the extended symbols is U+31A0 ... U+31BF. Four symbols for Cantonese and one for Minnan and Hakka coda were released in 2020 with the publication of version 13.0. One can learn more information from the proposals.

Bopomofo Extended^{[1]} Official Unicode Consortium code chart (PDF)
	0	1	2	3	4	5	6	7	8	9	A	B	C	D	E	F
U+31Ax	ㆠ	ㆡ	ㆢ	ㆣ	ㆤ	ㆥ	ㆦ	ㆧ	ㆨ	ㆩ	ㆪ	ㆫ	ㆬ	ㆭ	ㆮ	ㆯ
U+31Bx	ㆰ	ㆱ	ㆲ	ㆳ	ㆴ	ㆵ	ㆶ	ㆷ	ㆸ	ㆹ	ㆺ	ㆻ	ㆼ	ㆽ	ㆾ	ㆿ
Notes: 1. As of Unicode version 17.0

== Font support ==
The Academia Sinica of Taiwan has released three sets of fonts for Taiwanese Hokkien: "吳守禮標楷台語注音字型", "吳守禮細明台語注音字型", and "吳守禮台語注音字型". When the above fonts are used (to Chinese characters), the Bopomofo Phonetic Symbols will automatically appear. For words with more than one pronunciation, user can choose "破音" fonts to find the desired pronunciation. The user manual can be downloaded here.

== See also ==
- Taiwanese Hokkien
- Written Hokkien
- Pe̍h-ōe-jī
- Taiwanese Romanization System
- Taiwanese kana
- Bopomofo
