= Code2000 =

Pan-Unicode digital font

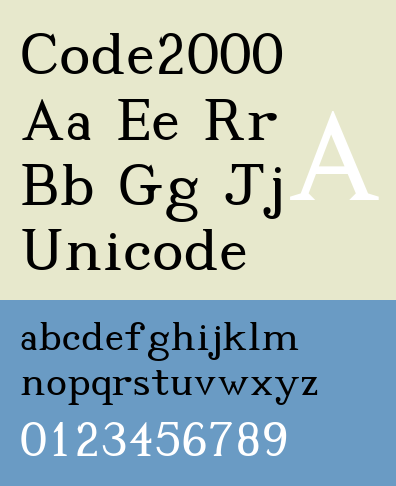
- Designer: James Kass
- Date released: 2023, v1.176

Code2001
- Designer: James Kass
- Date released: 2022, v0.922

Code2002
- Designer: James Kass
- Date released: 2022, v0.922

Code2000 is a serif and pan-Unicode digital font, which includes characters and symbols from a very large range of writing systems. As of the current version 1.176 released in 2023, Code2000 is designed and implemented by James Kass to include as much of the Unicode 15.1 standard as practical (with 15.1 being the currently-released version), and to support OpenType digital typography features. Code2000 supports the Basic Multilingual Plane. Code2001 was designed to support the Supplementary Multilingual Plane, with ISO 8859-1 characters shared with Code2000 for compatibility. A third font, Code2002, was left substantially unfinished and never officially released.

Code2000 was released as shareware/donationware, with the licensing fee set at $5.00. Code2001 was released under a free software license that prohibited most derivative works but otherwise allowed free use, redistribution and embedding. The project was discontinued in 2008, with its web domain name later taken by an Australian programming site.

On September 13, 2023, after 15 years of inactivity, Kass relaunched the project and began work on updating the fonts.

== Code2000 ==
The names in the following list are taken directly from the Unicode standard.

- Basic Latin
- Latin-1 Supplement
- Latin Extended – A
- Latin Extended – B
- IPA Extensions
- Spacing Modifier Letters
- Combining Diacritical Marks
- Greek and Coptic
- Cyrillic
- Cyrillic Supplementary
- Armenian
- Hebrew
- Arabic
- Syriac
- Thaana
- Devanagari
- Bengali
- Gurmukhi
- Gujarati
- Oriya
- Tamil
- Telugu
- Kannada
- Malayalam
- Thai
- Lao
- Myanmar
- Georgian
- Hangul Jamo
- Ethiopic
- Cherokee
- Unified Canadian Aboriginal Syllabics
- Ogham
- Runic
- Buhid
- Khmer
- Mongolian
- Limbu
- Tai Le
- New Tai Lue
- Khmer Symbols
- Buginese
- Balinese
- Sundanese
- Lepcha
- Ol Chiki
- Phonetic Extensions
- Phonetic Extensions Supplement
- Combining Diacritical Marks – Supplement
- Latin Extended Additional
- Greek Extended
- General Punctuation
- Superscripts and Subscripts
- Currency Symbols
- Combining Diacritical Marks for Symbols
- Letter-like Symbols
- Number Forms
- Arrows
- Mathematical Operators
- Miscellaneous Technical
- Control Pictures, which are graphical presentations (via different code points) for the 34 control characters in 7-bit ASCII and among the first 128 code points of Unicode, including space and delete
- Optical Character Recognition
- Enclosed Alphanumerics
- Box Drawing
- Block Elements
- Geometric Shapes
- Miscellaneous Symbols
- Dingbats
- Braille Patterns
- Supplemental Arrows – B
- Miscellaneous Mathematical Symbols – B
- Supplemental Mathematical Operators
- Miscellaneous Symbols and Arrows
- Glagolitic
- Latin Extended-C
- Coptic
- Georgian Supplement
- Tifinagh
- Ethiopic Extended
- Cyrillic Extended-A
- Supplemental Punctuation
- CJK Radicals Supplement
- Kangxi Radicals
- Ideographic Description Characters
- CJK Symbols and Punctuation
- Hiragana
- Katakana
- Bopomofo
- Hangul Compatibility Jamo
- Kanbun
- Bopomofo Extended
- CJK Strokes
- Katakana Phonetic Extensions
- Enclosed CJK Letters and Months
- CJK Compatibility
- CJK Unified Ideographs Extension A
- Yijing Hexagram Symbols
- CJK Unified Ideographs
- Yi Syllables
- Yi Radicals
- Vai
- Cyrillic Extended-B
- Modifier Tone Letters
- Latin Extended-D
- Syloti Nagri
- Phags-pa
- Saurashtra
- Kayah Li
- Rejang
- Cham
- Hangul Syllables
- CJK Compatibility Ideographs
- Alphabetic Presentation Forms
- Arabic Presentation Forms – A
- Variation Selectors
- Vertical Forms
- Combining Half Marks
- CJK Compatibility Forms
- Arabic Presentation Forms – B
- Half-width and Full-width Forms
- Specials

It also includes several scripts not officially recognized, in the Unicode Private Use Areas:

- Tengwar (ConScript Unicode Registry)
- Cirth (ConScript Unicode Registry)
- Ewellic (ConScript Unicode Registry)
- Phaistos (ConScript Unicode Registry)
- Klingon (ConScript Unicode Registry)

== Code2001 ==
This is a second font in the Code 2000 family. It covers the Unicode Plane One Supplementary Multilingual Plane, mostly used for historic language scripts. The majority of these glyphs are not found in Code 2000.

Code2001 includes support for:

- ISO-8859-1 characters
- Linear B
- Aegean numbers
- Phaistos
- Old Italic
- Gothic
- Ugaritic
- Old Persian Cuneiform
- Deseret
- Shavian script
- Osmanya
- Cypriot syllabary
- Phoenician
- Byzantine Musical Symbols
- Musical Symbols
- Tài Xuán Jīng Symbols
- Counting Rod Numerals
- Mathematical Alphanumeric Symbols (including the ones in the Letter-like Symbols block)
- Domino Tiles

As the font ceased updating in 2008, it does not include the emoji, added to Unicode in version 6.0, that make up the best-known and most commonly used characters in the set. This font covers a few characters in the Unicode Plane Two Supplementary Ideographic Plane. It also covers a few tags in Unicode Plane Fourteen Supplementary Special-purpose Plane.

Also included are:

- Tengwar
- Cirth
- Pollard script

The first two are not yet approved for use in Unicode, and therefore are encoded in the Plane Fifteen Private Use Area and the Basic Multilingual Plane. (As noted above, the former two are also available in Code2000.) The Pollard Script is in Unicode now, so its spot is deprecated.

== Code2002 ==
This is a third font in the Code 2000 family. The glyphs in this font are not part of either Code 2000 or Code 2001.

This font partially covers the Unicode Plane Two Supplementary Ideographic Plane. This is a Supplementary Plane used for Chinese, Japanese, and Korean ideographs. Roughly 40% of Plane Two is included in this font.

== See also ==
- Unicode typeface
- Free software Unicode typefaces
- Unicode

Other well-known Unicode fonts include:

- Arial Unicode MS
- Lucida Sans Unicode
- TITUS Cyberbit Basic
- TITUS Cyberbit Unicode
- Free UCS Outline Fonts
