= Daī-ghî tōng-iōng pīng-im =

Latin orthography for Taiwanese Hokkien

Daī-ghî tōng-iōng pīng-im (abbr: DT; Chinese: 臺語通用拼音; lit. 'Taiwanese phonetic transcription system') is an orthography in the Latin alphabet for Taiwanese Hokkien based upon Tongyong Pinyin. It is able to use the Latin alphabet to indicate the proper variation of pitch with nine diacritic symbols.

== Phonology ==
Consonants
			Dental	Alveolo-palatal	Bilabial	Alveolar	Velar	Glottal
Plosive	voiceless	unaspiration			b	d	g	-h/ ' ([ʔ])
Plosive	voiceless	aspiration			p	t	k	
Plosive	voiced	unaspiration			bh		gh	
Affricate	voiceless	unaspiration	z	zi				
Affricate	voiceless	aspiration	c	ci				
Affricate	voiced	unaspiration		r				
Fricative	voiceless	unaspiration	s	si				
Fricative	voiceless	aspiration						h
Nasal	voiced	unaspiration			m	n	ng	
Lateral	voiced	unaspiration				l		

Vowels
	Front	Central	Back
Close	i		u
Close-mid	e		or(2)
Mid		or(1)	
Open-mid			o
Open	a		

DT in its present form has 17 initials, 18 finals and 8 tones.

=== Tone number ===
Taiwanese is a tonal language. In Taiwanese, which has nine tones and two extra tones, neutral tone and nasal vowel.

DT tone number
1st	2nd	3rd	4th	5th	6th	7th	8th	9th	Neutral	Nasal
a	à	a̱	ā(p/t/k/h)	ă	à	ā	a(p/t/k/h)	á	å	aⁿ/ann

== Tone definition ==
Schema of the tone sandhi rules in Taiwanese.

=== Tone marks ===
Tones are expressed by diacritics; checked syllables (i.e. those ending with glottal stops) are followed by the letter h. Where diacritics are not technically available, e.g. on some parts of the internet, tone alphabet may be used instead.

1. a (1st tone; yinping)
2. à (2nd tone; yingshang)
3. a̠ (3rd tone; yinqu)
4. ā (ptkh) (4th tone; yinru)
5. ă (5th tone; yangping)
6. ä (6th tone; yangshang)
7. ā (7th tone; yangqu)
8. a (ptkh) (8th tone; yangru)
9. á (9th tone; high rising)
10. å (neutral tone)
11. aⁿ (ann) (nasal vowel)

Examples for these tones: ciūⁿ (elephant), bâ (leopard), bhè (horse), di (pig), zŭa (snake), āh (duck), lok (deer). And, a neutral tone, sometimes indicated by å(aj) in DT, has no specific contour; its pitch always depends on the tones of the preceding syllables. Taiwanese speakers refer to this tone as the "neutral tone" (Chinese: 輕聲).

=== Tone sandhi ===
Tone sandhi or chain shift by circulation, as the tones are encoded by appending and modifying spellings with attention to the rules of the DT system. The basic tone has no modification and tone mark. Generally speaking, the basic tone means the 7th tone (mid even tone; yangqu).

== Morphology ==
A DT word, like an English word, can be formed by only one syllable or several syllables, with the two syllables being the general typicality. Each syllable in DT follows one of the six underlying patterns:

=== Alphabet ===
The DT alphabet adopts the Latin alphabet of 19 letters, 4 digraphs, and 6 diacritics to express the basic sounds of Taiwanese:

dt capital letter	A	B	Bh	C	D	E	G	Gh	H	I	K	L	M	N	Ng	O	Or	P	R	S	T	U	Z
dt lower case	a	b	bh	c	d	e	g	gh	h	i	k	l	m	n	ng	o	or	p	r	s	t	u	z

=== Initials ===
bh, z, c, gh, h, r, g, k, l, m, n, ng, b, p, s, d, t

Note that unlike their typical interpretation in modern English language, bh and gh are voiced and unaspirated, whereas b, g, and d are plain unvoiced as in Hanyu Pinyin. p, k, and t are unvoiced and aspirated, corresponding closer to p, t, and k in English. It is inconsistent with the use of h's in the Legge romanization and the use of the diacritic in the International Phonetic Alphabet to signal consonantal aspiration.

=== Finals ===
- Vowels: a, i, u, e, or, o
- Diphthongs: ai, au, ia, iu, io, ui, ua, ue
- Triphthongs: iau, uai
- Nasals: m, n, ng

The nasals m, n, and ng can be appended to any of the vowels and some of the diphthongs. In addition, m and ng can function as independent syllables by themselves.

The stops h, g, b and d can appear as the last letter in a syllable, in which case they are pronounced with no audible release. (The final h in DT stands for a glottal stop.)

=== Delimiting symbols ===
All syllables in each word are normally separated by the dash (-) mark. Generally, syllables before the dash which must undergo tone sandhi.

== DT examples ==
=== Universal Declaration of Human Rights ===
DT
Lēn-hâ-gōk sê-gāi rīn-kūan sūan-ghĕn

Dê 1 diău

Lāng-lăng seⁿ-låi zû-iŭ, zāi zūn-ghiăm gāh kuăn-lī siòng it-lip bīng-dìng. In hù-iù li-sîng gāh liōng-sim, lî-ciaⁿ ìng-gai i hiānn-dī gūan-hē ē zīng-sĭn hō-siōng dùi-dāi.

English
Universal Declaration of Human Rights

Article 1

All human beings are born free and equal in dignity and rights. They are endowed with reason and conscience and should act towards one another in a spirit of brotherhood.

=== Greeting of Voyager Golden Record ===
DT	English	Audio file: Voyager Golden Record
Tài-kong bīng-iù, lin hòr! Lin ziâ-bà bhē! Û-ĭng, dôr-lăi ghun-zia zē òr.	Friends of space, how are you all! Have you eaten yet? Drop in on us if you have time.	Taiwanese(Amoy; Min nan; Formosan) sound record of voyager 1
