= Taiwanese Hangul =

Orthography system for Taiwanese Hokkien

- Chinese characters "臺語諺文" written in Taiwanese Hangul
- Script type: Featural alphabet
- Creator: Hsu Tsao-te (first proposed)
- Period: since 1987
- Languages: Taiwanese Hokkien

Related scripts
- Parent systems: Hangul: Taiwanese Hangul

Taiwanese Hangul (Hangul: 대끼깐뿐; Chinese: 臺語諺文; pinyin: Táiyǔ Yànwén; Pe̍h-ōe-jī: Tâi-gí Gān-bûn; Korean: 대만어 한글/타이완어 한글) is an orthography system for Taiwanese Hokkien (Taiwanese). Developed and promoted by Taiwanese linguist Hsu Tsao-te (許曹德) in 1987, it uses modified Hangul letters to represent spoken Taiwanese, and was later supported by Ang Ui-jin.

Because both Chinese characters and Hangul are both written in the space of square boxes, unlike letters of the Latin alphabet, the use of Chinese-Hangul mixed writing is able to keep the spacing between the two scripts more consistent compared to Chinese-Latin mixed writing. Anecdotally, the system was boosted by in the 1990s as an early attempt to communicate in spoken Taiwanese using the then newly introduced mail servers being implemented at the National Taiwan University.

== Letters ==
=== Initials ===
		Bilabial		Alveolar		Alveolo-palatal		Velar		Glottal
		Voiceless	Voiced	Voiceless	Voiced	Voiceless	Voiced	Voiceless	Voiced	Voiceless
Nasal			ᄆ [m] ㄇ 毛 (mo͘ )		ᄂ [n] ㄋ 耐 (nāi)				ㄸ [ŋ] ㄫ 雅 (ngá)	
Stop	Unaspirated	ᄇ [p] ㄅ 邊 (pian)	ᄈ [b] ㆠ 文 (bûn)	ᄃ [t] ㄉ 地 (tē)				ᄀ [k] ㄍ 求 (kiû)	ᄁ [ɡ] ㆣ 語 (gí)	
Stop	Aspirated	ᄑ [pʰ] ㄆ 波 (pho)		ᄐ [tʰ] ㄊ 他 (thaⁿ)				ᄏ [kʰ] ㄎ 去 (khì)		
Affricate	Unaspirated			ᄌ [ts] ㄗ 曾 (tsan/chan)	ᄍ [dz] ㆡ 熱 (joa̍h)	ᄌ [tɕ] ㄐ 尖 (tsiam/chiam)	ᄍ [dʑ] ㆢ 入 (ji̍p)			
Affricate	Aspirated			ᄎ [tsʰ] ㄘ 出 (tshut/chhut)		ᄎ [tɕʰ] ㄑ 手 (tshiú/chhiú)				
Fricative				ㅅ [s] ㄙ 衫 (saⁿ)		ㅅ [ɕ] ㄒ 寫 (siá)				ᄒ [h] ㄏ 喜 (hí)
Lateral					ᄅ [l] ㄌ 柳 (liú)					

=== Vowels ===
Monophthongs
	Front		Central	Back	
	Simple	Nasal	Simple	Simple	Nasal
Close	ᅵ [i] ㄧ 衣 (i)	잇 [ĩ] ㆪ 圓 (îⁿ)		ᅮ [u] ㄨ 污 (u)	웃 [ũ] ㆫ 張 (tiuⁿ)
Mid	ᅦ [e] ㆤ 禮 (lé)	엣 [ẽ] ㆥ 生 (seⁿ)	ᅥ [ə] ㄜ 高 (ko)	ᅩ [ɔ] ㆦ 烏 (o͘ )	옷 [ɔ̃] ㆧ 翁 (oⁿ)
Open	ᅡ [a] ㄚ 查 (cha)	앗 [ã] ㆩ 衫 (saⁿ)			

Diphthongs & Triphthongs
Diphthongs	ᅢ [aɪ] ㄞ (ai)	알 [aʊ] ㄠ (au)	ᅣ [ɪa] ㄧㄚ (ia)	ᅧ [ɪo] ㄧㄜ (io)
Diphthongs	ᅲ [iu] ㄧㄨ (iu)	ᅪ [ua] ㄨㄚ (oa)	ᅰ [ue] ㄨㆤ (oe)	ᅱ [ui] ㄨㄧ (ui)
Triphthongs	얄 [ɪaʊ] ㄧㄠ (iau)		ᅫ [uai] ㄨㄞ (oai)	

=== Coda endings ===
	Bilabial	Alveolar	Velar	Glottal
Nasal consonant	ᄆ [m] ㆬ (-m)	ᄂ [n] ㄣ (-n)	ㅇ [ŋ] ㆭ (-ng)	
Stop consonant	ᄇ [p̚] ㆴ (-p)	ᄃ [t̚] ㆵ (-t)	ᄀ [k̚] ㆻ (-k)	ᄒ [ʔ] ㆷ (-h)

=== Tone markings ===
No.	Hangul	Latin diacritics	Chinese tone name	Examples Hangul/Latin/Hanzi (Listen 🔊) meaning
1	ᄋ	absent	陰平 (yinping) dark level	카_{ᄋ}/kha/跤 🔊 foot; leg
2	ᄅ	◌́	上聲 (sióng-siaⁿ)/陰上 (yinshang) rising / dark rising	쥐_{ㄹ}/tsúi/水 🔊 water
3	ᄂ	◌̀	陰去 (yinqu) dark departing	갈_{ㄴ}/kàu/到 🔊 arrive
4	ᄋ	absent	陰入 (yinru) dark entering	빻_{ㅇ}/bah/肉 🔊 meat
5	ᄉ	◌̂	陽平 (yangping) light level	옹_{ㅅ}/ông/王 🔊 king
(6) appears only in Lukang dialect; merged to 7 in the prestige dialect	not devised	◌̆	陽上 (yangshang) light rising	[]/huǎn (Lukang)/犯 violate / commit (a crime)
7	ᄀ	◌̄	陽去 (yangqu) light departing	환_{ㄱ}/huān (prestige)/犯 🔊 violate / commit (a crime)
8	ᄇ	̍ (overstroke/vertical line above)	陽入 (yangru) light entering	쫳_{ㅂ}/joa̍h/熱 🔊 hot
Continuous tone sandhi	ㅣ	absent	occurs when a character/syllable is before another one in a phrase. Rule of the prestige dialect: 5→7, 7→3, 3→2, 2→1, 1→7; 4→8, 8→4	대_{시}끼_{ㄹ}/Tâi-gí/臺語 🔊 Taiwanese language

== Different use of Hangul between Taiwanese and Korean ==
	Taiwanese Hokkien	Korean	Note
ㅃ	/b/, a voiced consonant	/p͈/, a tense consonant	
ㄲ	/g/, a voiced consonant	/k͈/, a tense consonant	
ㅉ	/ʣ/ or /ʥ/, a voiced consonant	/t͡ɕ͈/, a tense consonant	
ㄸ	/ŋ/,	/t͈/	as the syllable onset such as 따
ㅎ	/ʔ/, a glottal stop	/t̚/	as the syllable coda such as 앟
ㅅ	/ⁿ/, vowel nasalization	/t̚/	as the syllable coda such as 앗
ㅆ	/ⁿʔ/, a combination of ㅅ and ㅎ	/s͈/ or /t̚/	as the syllable coda such as 았
ᅥ	/o/ or /ə/	/ʌ/	
ᅩ	/ɔ/	/o/	
ㅐ	/ai/	/ɛ/	
알	/au/	/aɭ/	
ㅡ	silent	/ɯ/	
ㅢ	읨/m̩ʔ/, 읭/ŋ̍ʔ/	/ɰi/, /i/, /ɛ/	

== Examples ==
=== Matthew 6:1 ===
Taiwanese Hangul		Pe̍h-ōe-jī	
Chinese characters	關係行善的教訓 恁著謹慎，毋通為著欲予儂看，故意蹛儂的面前顯示恁的善行； 恁若按呢做，恁就袂當對天父得著報賞。		
Chinese-Hangul mixed writing	關係行善에教訓 린뎧謹慎，음탕為뎧뼇호儂看，故意돠儂에面前顯示린에善行； 린若안네做，린就뻬당뒤天父得뎧報賞。	Chinese-Latin mixed writing	關係行善ê教訓 Lín tio̍h謹慎，m̄-thang為tio̍h boeh hō͘儂看，故意toà儂ê面前顯示lín ê善行； Lín若án-ne做，lín就bē-tàng tùi天父得tio̍h報賞。
Hangul	관헤 형센 에 갈훈 린 뎧 긴신，음탕 위뎧 뼇 호 랑 쾃，고이 돠 랑 에 삔졍 헨시 린 에 센형； 린 나 안네 저，린 쥬 뻬당 뒤 텐후 딛뎧 버슛。	Romanization	Koan-he Hêng-siān ê Kàu-hùn Lín tio̍h kín-sīn, m̄-thang ūi-tio̍h boeh hō͘ lâng khoàⁿ, kò-ì toà lâng ê bīn-chêng hián-sī lín ê siān-hêng. Lín nā án-ne chò, lín chiū bē-tàng tùi Thian-hū tit-tio̍h pò-siúⁿ.

== See also ==
- Cantonese Hangul
