= Taiwanese Language Phonetic Alphabet =

Taiwanese Language Phonetic Alphabet (Chinese: 臺灣語言音標方案; pinyin: Táiwān yǔyán yīnbiāo fāng'àn; Pe̍h-ōe-jī: Tâi-ôan gí-giân im-piau hong-àn), more commonly known by its initials TLPA, is a romanization system for the Taiwanese Hokkien, Taiwanese Hakka, and indigenous Taiwanese languages. Based on Pe̍h-ōe-jī and first published in full in 1998, it was intended as a transcription system rather than as a full-fledged orthography.

== See also ==
- Pe̍h-ōe-jī
- Pha̍k-fa-sṳ
- Taiwanese Hakka Romanization System
- Pinfa
- Hagfa Pinyim
