= Taiwanese kana =

Writing system for Taiwanese Hokkien

- Script type: Syllabary with some features of an alphabet
- Period: 1896–1945
- Languages: Taiwanese Hokkien

Related scripts
- Parent systems: Oracle bone script: Seal script; Clerical script; Regular script (kanji); Man'yōgana; Katakana; Taiwanese kana
- Sister systems: Hakka kana

ISO 15924
- ISO 15924: Kana (411), Katakana

Unicode
- Unicode alias: Katakana

Taiwanese kana

Chinese name
- Traditional Chinese: 臺灣語假名
- Simplified Chinese: 台湾语假名
Transcriptions
Standard Mandarin
- Hanyu Pinyin: Táiwānyǔ jiǎmíng
- Wade–Giles: T'ai^{2}-wan^{1}-yü^{3} chia^{3}-ming^{2}
- Tongyong Pinyin: Táiwanyǔ jiǎmíng
Southern Min
- Hokkien POJ: Tâi-oân-gí ká-bêng

Japanese name
- Kyūjitai: 臺灣語假名
- Shinjitai: 台湾語仮名
Transcriptions
- Romanization: Taiwan-go kana

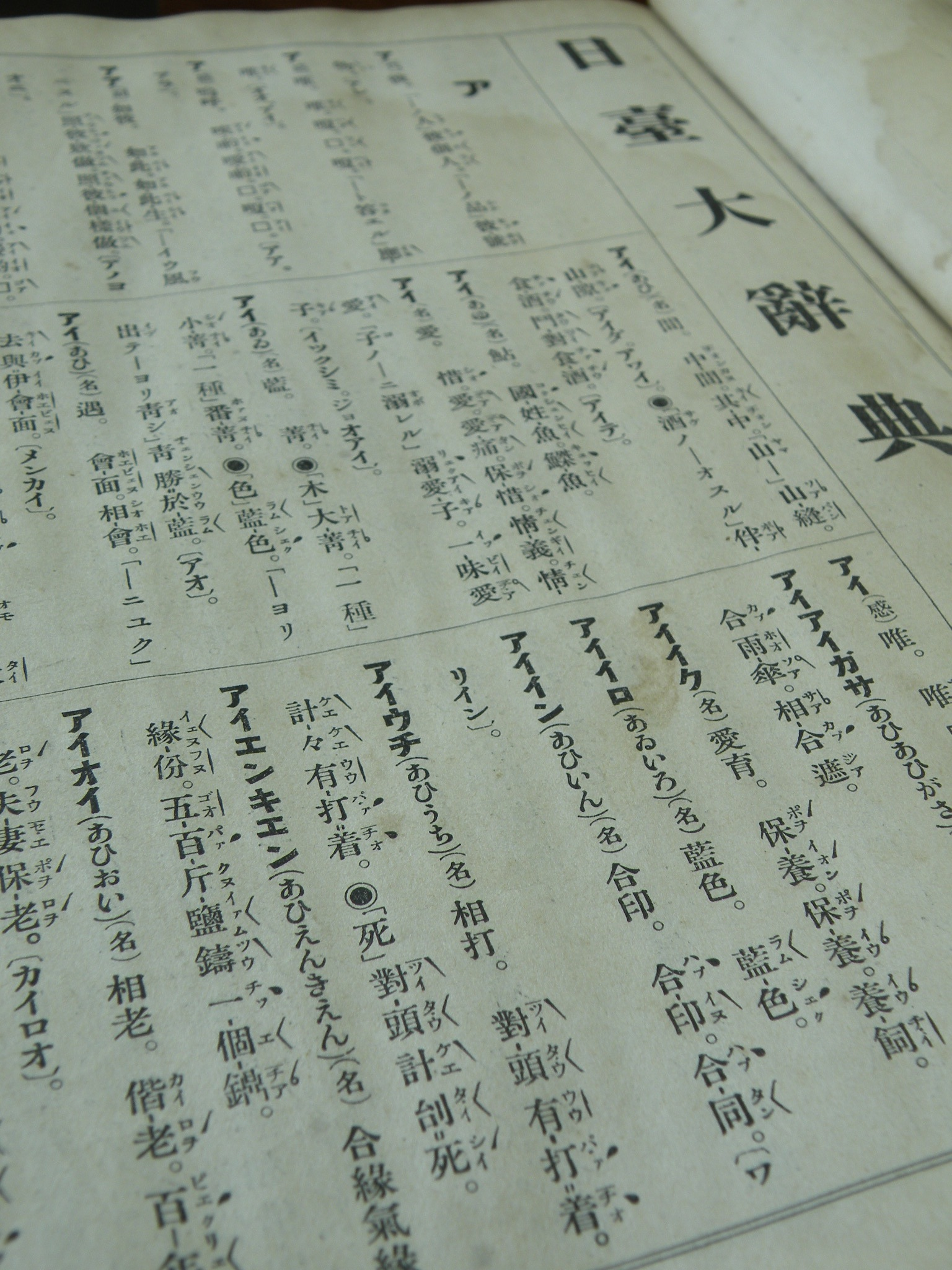
A page from the Japanese–Taiwanese Dictionary (日臺大辭典, Nittai daijiten) of 1907, by Ogawa Naoyoshi

Taiwanese kana (タイ𚿳ヲァヌ𚿳ギイ𚿰カア𚿰ビェン𚿳; Pe̍h-ōe-jī: Tâi-oân-gí ká-bêng) is a katakana-based writing system that was used to write Taiwanese Hokkien (commonly called "Taiwanese") when the island of Taiwan was under Japanese rule. It functioned as a phonetic guide to Chinese characters, much like furigana in Japanese or Bopomofo in Chinese. There were similar systems for other languages in Taiwan as well, including Hakka and Formosan languages.

The system was imposed by Japan at the time and used in a few dictionaries, as well as textbooks. The Taiwanese–Japanese Dictionary, published in 1931–32, is an example. It uses various signs and diacritics to identify sounds that do not exist in Japanese. The system is chiefly built for the Amoy dialect of Hokkien spoken in Taiwan, with some consideration for the Quanzhou and Zhangzhou dialects of Hokkien also spoken in Taiwan as well, which descendant speakers of all three of the historical major dialects of Hokkien thrived, developed, and intermixed in Taiwan for centuries producing modern Taiwanese Hokkien and its own specific regional dialects throughout the island (Formosa) and nearby smaller islands (e.g. Pescadores).

Through the system, the Office of the Governor-General of Taiwan aimed to help Taiwanese people learn the Japanese language, as well as help Japanese people learn the Taiwanese language. Linguistically speaking, however, the syllabary system was cumbersome for a language that has phonology far more complicated than Japanese. After Japanese administration ended, the system soon became obsolete. Now, only a few scholars, such as those who study the aforementioned dictionary, learn Taiwanese kana.

The system underwent modification over time. This article is mainly about the last edition, used from roughly 1931.

== Basic rules ==
Mapped sounds are mostly similar to katakana in Japanese, with the kana ヤ, ユ, ヨ, ワ, ヰ, and ヱ not used. Each syllable is written with two or three kana (with a few exceptions). Notable differences include:

=== Vowels ===
- There are six vowels in Taiwanese: ア [a], イ [i], ウ [u], エ [e], オ [ɔ], ヲ [o]. The pronunciations of ウ, オ, and ヲ are different from Japanese (which are [ɯ], [o], and [(w)o] respectively.)
- The vowel ヲ is pronounced [u] in the diphthongs ヲア [ua] and ヲエ [ue], also their extensions such as ヲァイ [uai], ヲァッ [uat̚]. In some dialects ヲ may be pronounced [o] or [ɤ].
- In syllables with a single vowel, the kana for the vowel is repeated, like the long vowels in Japanese. For example, カア [ka], キイ [ki], オオ [ɔ], ヲヲ [o].
- The small kana ァ, ィ, ゥ, ェ, ォ, 𛅦 are defined as short vowels. They are used to represent the second vowel in the middle of a syllable, or a final glottal stop. For example, キァウ [kiau], キェㇰ for [kiɪk̚], キァゥ [kiauʔ].
- There are two optional vowel kana for the Choân-chiu accent (Quanzhou dialect): ウ̅ [ɯ] and オ̅ [ə]. For example, クウ̅ [kɯ], クオ̅ [kə], クゥ̅ヌ [kɯn].

=== Consonants ===
- フ is pronounced [hu], not [ɸɯ] as in Japanese.
- There are six overlined kana to distinguish [t] and [ts]/[tɕ]. サ̅ [tsa], チ̅ [ti], ツ̅ [tu] or [tɯ], セ̅ [tse], ソ̅ [tso] or [tsɔ] or [tsə], ト̅ [tə].

	Taiwanese kana						Modern Japanese kana				
IPA	a	i	u/ɯ	e/ɛ	o/ɔ	ə	ä	i	ɯ̟/ɯ̟ᵝ	e̞	o̞
t	タ	チ̅	ツ̅	テ	ト	ト̅	タ	ティ	トゥ	テ	ト
ts/tɕ	サ̅	チ	ツ	セ̅	ソ̅	ソ̅	ツァ	チ	ツ	ツェ	ツォ

- The aspirated consonants [pʰ], [tʰ], [kʰ], [tsʰ]/[tɕʰ] are represented by adding an underdot to the kana. For example, ク̣ for [kʰu].
- Final nasal consonants are written as ム [m], ヌ [n], ン [ŋ]. Note that ム, ヌ are pronounced [mu], [nu] when they are used as initials. For example, カヌ [kan], ヌヌ for [nun].
- The syllabic consonant [ŋ̍] is spelt (u+)ン, for example クン [kŋ̍]. Note that [ŋ̍] without a preceding vowel is written as a single ン, not ウン or ンン.
- The syllabic consonant [m̩] is spelt (u+)ム, for example フム [hm̩]. Note that [m̩] without a preceding vowel is written as a single ム, not ウム or ムム.
- Initial [ŋ] is spelt as [ɡ] with a nasal tone sign. For example, ガア𚿰 [ɡa˥˩], ガア𚿸 [ŋa˥˩].
- Final plosives (which have no audible release) are ㇷ゚ [p̚], ッ [t̚], ㇰ [k̚], similar to the kana used in Ainu.
- Final glottal stops [ʔ] are represented by the short-vowel small kana (ァ, ィ, ゥ, ェ, ォ, 𛅦) at the end. For example, カァ [kaʔ], カゥ [kauʔ].

=== Tone signs ===
There are different tone signs for oral vowels and nasal vowels.

Tone number	1	2(6)	3	4	5	7	8
Pitch	˦	˥˩	˧˩	ʔ˨	˨˦	˧	ʔ˥
Oral vowels	None	𚿰	𚿱	𚿲	𚿳	𚿵	𚿶
Nasal vowels	𚿷	𚿸	𚿹	𚿺	𚿻	𚿽	𚿾
Pe̍h-ōe-jī	a	á	à	ah	â	ā	a̍h

- When a text is written vertically, these signs are written on the right side of letters. Taiwanese kana is only attested in vertical orientation, so it is unknown where the signs would be placed if it were written horizontally.
- Initial consonants [m], [n], [ŋ] are always written with nasal vowel tone signs, whereas [b], [l], [ɡ] are always with oral vowels. Note that [ŋ] and [ɡ] share the same initial kana.

== Taiwanese kana chart ==
=== Rime chart ===
ア、イ
Vowel	Open syllable	Final nasals			Final plosives			
Vowel	Open syllable	[m]	[n]	[ŋ]	[p̚]	[t̚]	[k̚]	[ʔ]
[a]	アア	アム	アヌ	アン	アㇷ゚	アッ	アㇰ	アァ
[ai]	アイ							
[au]	アウ							アゥ
[ia]	イア	イァム		イァン	イァㇷ゚		イァㇰ	イァ
[iau]	イァウ							イァゥ
[i]	イイ	イム	イヌ		イㇷ゚	イッ		イィ
[iu]	イウ							イゥ
[ie]			イェヌ	イェン		イェッ	イェㇰ	
[iɔ]				イォン			イォㇰ	
[io]	イヲ							イ𛅦

ウ、エ、オ、ヲ、ム、ン
Vowel	Open syllable	Final nasals			Final plosives			
Vowel	Open syllable	[m]	[n]	[ŋ]	[p̚]	[t̚]	[k̚]	[ʔ]
[u]	ウウ		ウヌ			ウッ		ウゥ
[ui]	ウイ							
[ɯ]	ウ̅ウ̅		ウ̅ン					
[ɯi]	ウ̅イ							
[e]	エエ							エェ
[ɔ]	オオ	オム		オン	オㇷ゚		オㇰ	オォ
[ə]	オ̅オ̅							
[əe]	オ̅エ							
[ua]	ヲア		ヲァヌ	ヲァン		ヲァッ		ヲァ
[uai]	ヲァイ							
[ue]	ヲエ							ヲェ
[o]	ヲヲ							ヲ𛅦
[m̩]	ム							ム
[ŋ̍]	ン							ン

=== Syllable chart ===
	None	p	pʰ	b	m	t	tʰ	l	n	ts/tɕ	tsʰ/tɕʰ	s/ɕ	dz/dʑ	k	kʰ	ɡ/ŋ	h
a	アア	パア	パ̣ア	バア	マア	タア	タ̣ア	ラア	ナア	サ̅ア	サ̣̅ア	サア		カア	カ̣ア	ガア	ハア
aʔ	アァ	パァ	パ̣ァ	バァ		タァ	タ̣ァ	ラァ	ナァ	サ̅ァ	サ̣̅ァ	サァ		カァ	カ̣ァ		ハァ
ai	アイ	パイ	パ̣イ	バイ	マイ	タイ	タ̣イ	ライ	ナイ	サ̅イ	サ̣̅イ	サイ		カイ	カ̣イ	ガイ	ハイ
au	アウ	パウ	パ̣ウ	バウ	マウ	タウ	タ̣ウ	ラウ	ナウ	サ̅ウ	サ̣̅ウ	サウ		カウ	カ̣ウ	ガウ	ハウ
auʔ			パ̣ゥ		マゥ	タゥ		ラゥ	ナゥ		サ̣̅ゥ			カゥ			
am	アム					タム	タ̣ム	ラム		サ̅ム	サ̣̅ム	サム		カム	カ̣ム	ガム	ハム
an	アヌ	パヌ	パ̣ヌ	バヌ		タヌ	タ̣ヌ	ラヌ		サ̅ヌ	サ̣̅ヌ	サヌ		カヌ	カ̣ヌ	ガヌ	ハヌ
aŋ	アン	パン	パ̣ン	バン		タン	タ̣ン	ラン		サ̅ン	サ̣̅ン	サン		カン	カ̣ン	ガン	ハン
ap̚	アㇷ゚					タㇷ゚	タ̣ㇷ゚	ラㇷ゚		サ̅ㇷ゚	サ̣̅ㇷ゚	サㇷ゚		カㇷ゚	カ̣ㇷ゚		ハㇷ゚
at̚	アッ	パッ		バッ		タッ	タ̣ッ	ラッ		サ̅ッ	サ̣̅ッ	サッ		カッ	カ̣ッ		ハッ
ak̚	アㇰ	パㇰ	パ̣ㇰ	バㇰ		タㇰ	タ̣ㇰ	ラㇰ		サ̅ㇰ	サ̣̅ㇰ	サㇰ		カㇰ	カ̣ㇰ	ガㇰ	ハㇰ
ia	イア	ピア			ミア	チ̅ア	チ̣̅ア		ニア	チア	チ̣ア	シア	ジア	キア	キ̣ア	ガア	ヒア
iaʔ	イァ	ピァ	ピ̣ァ			チ̅ァ	チ̣̅ァ	リァ		チァ	チ̣ァ	シァ		キァ	キ̣ァ	ガァ	ヒァ
iau	イァウ	ピァウ	ピ̣ァウ	ビァウ	ミァウ	チ̅ァウ	チ̣̅ァウ	リァウ	ニァウ	チァウ	チ̣ァウ	シァウ	ジァウ	キァウ	キ̣ァウ	ギァウ	ヒァウ
iauʔ															カ̣ァゥ	ガァゥ	ハァゥ
iam	イァム					チ̅ァム	チ̣̅ァム	リァム		チァム	チ̣ァム	シァム	ジァム	キァム	キ̣ァム	ギァム	ヒァム
iaŋ	イァン	ピァン	ピ̣ァン					リァン		チァン	チ̣ァン	シァン	ジァン		キ̣ァン	ギァン	ヒァン
iap̚	イァㇷ゚					チ̅ァㇷ゚	チ̣̅ァㇷ゚	リァㇷ゚		チァㇷ゚	チ̣ァㇷ゚	シァㇷ゚	ジァㇷ゚	キァㇷ゚	キ̣ァㇷ゚	ギァㇷ゚	ヒァㇷ゚
iak̚		ピァㇰ	ピ̣ァㇰ			チ̅ァㇰ					チ̣ァㇰ	シァㇰ			キ̣ァㇰ		
i	イイ	ピイ	ピ̣イ	ビイ	ミイ	チ̅イ	チ̣̅イ	リイ	ニイ	チイ	チ̣イ	シイ	ジイ	キイ	キ̣イ	ギイ	ヒイ
iʔ		ピィ	ピ̣ィ	ビィ	ミィ	チ̅ィ	チ̣̅ィ		ニィ	チィ	チ̣ィ	シィ			キィ		
im	イム					チ̅ム	チ̣̅ム	リム		チム	チ̣ム	シム	ジム	キム	キ̣ム	ギム	ヒム
in	イヌ	ピヌ	ピ̣ヌ	ビヌ		チ̅ヌ	チ̣̅ヌ	リヌ		チヌ	チ̣ヌ	シヌ	ジヌ	キヌ	キ̣ヌ	ギヌ	ヒヌ
ip̚	イㇷ゚							リㇷ゚		チㇷ゚	チ̣ㇷ゚	シㇷ゚	ジㇷ゚	キㇷ゚	キ̣ㇷ゚		ヒㇷ゚
it̚	イッ	ピッ	ピ̣ッ	ビッ		チ̅ッ				チッ	チ̣ッ	シッ	ジッ	キッ	キ̣ッ		ヒッ
iu	イウ	ピウ		ビウ		チ̅ウ	チ̣̅ウ	リウ	ニウ	チウ	チ̣ウ	シウ	ジウ	キウ	キ̣ウ	ギウ	ヒウ
iuʔ	イゥ																ヒゥ
iɛn	イェヌ	ピェヌ	ピ̣ェヌ	ビェヌ		チ̅ェヌ	チ̣̅ェヌ	リェヌ		チェヌ	チ̣ェヌ	シェヌ	ジェヌ	キェヌ	キ̣ェヌ	ギェヌ	ヒェヌ
iɪŋ	イェン	ピェン	ピ̣ェン	ビェン		チ̅ェン	チ̣̅ェン	リェン		チェン	チ̣ェン	シェン		キェン	キ̣ェン	ギェン	ヒェン
iɛt̚	イェッ	ピェッ	ピ̣ェッ	ビェッ		チ̅ェッ	チ̣̅ェッ	リェッ		チェッ	チ̣ェッ	シェッ	ジェッ	キェッ	キ̣ェッ	ギェッ	ヒェッ
iɪk̚	イェㇰ	ピェㇰ	ピ̣ェㇰ	ビェㇰ		チ̅ェㇰ	チ̣̅ェㇰ	リェㇰ		チェㇰ	チ̣ェㇰ	シェㇰ		キェㇰ		ギェㇰ	ヒェㇰ
iɔŋ	イォン					チ̅ォン	チ̣̅ォン	リォン		チォン	チ̣ォン	シォン	ジォン	キォン	キ̣ォン	ギォン	ヒォン
iɔk̚	イォㇰ					チ̅ォㇰ	チ̣̅ォㇰ	リォㇰ		チォㇰ	チ̣ォㇰ	シォㇰ	ジォㇰ	キォㇰ	キ̣ォㇰ	ギォㇰ	ヒォㇰ
io	イヲ	ピヲ	ピ̣ヲ	ビヲ		チ̅ヲ	チ̣̅ヲ	リヲ		チヲ	チ̣ヲ	シヲ	ジヲ	キヲ	キ̣ヲ	ギヲ	ヒヲ
ioʔ	イ𛅦					チ̅𛅦		リ𛅦		チ𛅦	チ̣𛅦	シ𛅦		キ𛅦	キ̣𛅦	ギ𛅦	ヒ𛅦
ui	ウイ	プイ	プ̣イ	ブイ	ムイ	ツ̅イ	ツ̣̅イ	ルイ		ツイ	ツ̣イ	スイ		クイ	ク̣イ	グイ	フイ
ɯi	ウ̅イ	プゥ̅イ	プ̣ゥ̅イ			ツ̅ゥ̅イ	ツ̣̅ゥ̅イ			ツゥ̅イ	ツ̣ゥ̅イ			クゥ̅イ	ク̣ゥ̅イ	グゥ̅イ	フゥ̅イ
u	ウウ	プウ	プ̣ウ	ブウ		ツ̅ウ	ツ̣̅ウ	ルウ		ツウ	ツ̣ウ	スウ	ズウ	クウ	ク̣ウ	グウ	フウ
uʔ	ウゥ	プゥ	プ̣ゥ			ツ̅ゥ	ツ̣̅ゥ			ツゥ	ツ̣ゥ				ク̣ゥ		
ɯ	ウ̅ウ̅					ツ̅ウ̅	ツ̣̅ウ̅	ルウ̅		ツウ̅	ツ̣ウ̅	スウ̅	ズウ̅	クウ̅	ク̣ウ̅	グウ̅	フウ̅
un	ウヌ	プヌ	プ̣ヌ	ブヌ		ツ̅ヌ	ツ̣̅ヌ	ルヌ		ツヌ	ツ̣ヌ	スヌ	ズヌ	クヌ	ク̣ヌ	グヌ	フヌ
ɯn	ウ̅ン											スゥ̅ヌ		クゥ̅ヌ	ク̣ゥ̅ヌ	グゥ̅ヌ	フゥ̅ン
ut̚	ウッ	プッ	プ̣ッ	ブッ		ツ̅ッ	ツ̣̅ッ	ルッ		ツッ	ツ̣ッ	スッ		クッ	ク̣ッ		フッ
ɯt̚																グゥ̅ッ	
m̩	ム																フム
m̩ʔ																	フム
ŋ̍	ン	プン			ムン	ツ̅ン	ツ̣̅ン		ヌン	ツン	ツ̣ン	スン		クン	ク̣ン		フン
ŋ̍ʔ			プ̣ン								ツ̣ン	スン					フン
e	エエ	ペエ	ペ̣エ	ベエ	メエ	テエ	テ̣エ	レエ	ネエ	セ̅エ	セ̣̅エ	セエ		ケエ	ケ̣エ	ゲエ	ヘエ
eʔ	エェ	ペェ		ベェ	メェ	テェ	テ̣ェ	レェ	ネェ	セ̅ェ	セ̣̅ェ	セェ		ケェ	ケ̣ェ	ゲェ	ヘェ
ə	オ̅オ̅	ポオ̅	ポ̣オ̅	ボオ̅		ト̅オ̅	ト̣オ̅	ロオ̅		ソ̅オ̅	ソ̣̅オ̅	ソオ̅	ゾオ̅	コ̅オ̅	コ̣オ̅	ゴオ̅	ホオ̅
əʔ	オ̅ォ̅	ポォ̅		ボォ̅		トォ̅		ロォ̅		ソ̅ォ̅	ソ̣̅ォ̅	ソォ̅		コォ̅	コ̣ォ̅		
ɔ	オオ	ポオ	ポ̣オ	ボオ	モオ	トオ	ト̣オ	ロオ	ノオ	ソ̅オ	ソ̣̅オ	ソオ		コオ	コ̣オ	ゴオ	ホオ
ɔʔ					モォ												
ɔm	オム					トム						ソム					
ɔŋ	オン	ポン	ポ̣ン	ボン		トン	ト̣ン	ロン		ソ̅ン	ソ̣̅ン	ソン		コン	コ̣ン	ゴン	ホン
ək̚														コォ̅ク	コ̣ォ̅ク		
ɔk̚	オㇰ	ポㇰ	ポ̣ㇰ	ボㇰ		トㇰ	ト̣ㇰ	ロㇰ		ソ̅ㇰ	ソ̣̅ㇰ	ソㇰ		コㇰ	コ̣ㇰ	ゴㇰ	ホㇰ
ua	ヲア	ポア	ポ̣ア	ボア	モア	トア	ト̣ア	ロア	ノア	ソ̅ア	ソ̣̅ア	ソア		コア	コ̣ア	ゴア	ホア
uaʔ	ヲァ	ポァ	ポ̣ァ	ボァ			ト̣ァ	ロァ		ソ̅ァ	ソ̣̅ァ	ソァ	ゾァ	コァ	コ̣ァ		ホァ
uai	ヲァイ									ソ̅ァイ		ソァイ		コァイ	コ̣ァイ		ホァイ
uan	ヲァヌ	ポァヌ	ポ̣ァヌ	ボァヌ		トァヌ	ト̣ァヌ	ロァヌ		ソ̅ァヌ	ソ̣̅ァヌ	ソァヌ		コァヌ	コ̣ァヌ	ゴァヌ	ホァヌ
uaŋ	ヲァン										ソ̣̅ァン						
uat̚	ヲァッ	ポァッ	ポ̣ァッ	ボァッ		トァッ	ト̣ァッ	ロァッ		ソ̅ァッ		ソァッ		コァッ	コ̣ァッ	ゴァッ	ホァッ
ue	ヲエ	ポエ	ポ̣エ	ボエ		トエ		ロエ		ソ̅エ	ソ̣̅エ	ソエ	ゾエ	コエ	コ̣エ	ゴエ	ホエ
ueʔ	ヲェ	ポェ	ポ̣ェ	ボェ								ソェ		コェ	コ̣ェ	ゴェ	ホェ
əe						トォ̅エ	ト̣ォ̅エ	ロォ̅エ		ソ̅ォ̅エ	ソ̣̅ォ̅エ	ソォ̅エ		コォ̅エ	コ̣ォ̅エ	ゴォ̅エ	ホォ̅エ
o	ヲヲ	ポヲ	ポ̣ヲ	ボヲ		トヲ	ト̣ヲ	ロヲ		ソ̅ヲ	ソ̣̅ヲ	ソヲ		コヲ	コ̣ヲ	ゴヲ	ホヲ
oʔ	ヲ𛅦	ポ𛅦	ポ̣𛅦			ト𛅦	ト̣𛅦	ロ𛅦		ソ̅𛅦	ソ̣̅𛅦	ソ𛅦		コ𛅦			ホ𛅦

1. Tone signs are always needed for a syllable.
2. [ɡ] always takes oral vowel tone signs; [m], [n], [ŋ] always take nasal vowel tone signs.
3. Some spellings are not clear. 仔(á) was sometimes written as ア rather than アア. 的(ê) was sometimes written as エ rather than エエ.
4. [ɔ] is spelt with オ, such as in オオ, ポオ, イオ, ピオ, and so on.

== Example ==
Audio file:
Taiwanese kana:	シェヌ シイ𚿷 コン𚿰、ハㇰ𚿶 シェン チ̅ァム𚿵 チ̅ァム𚿵 チ̣̅ア𚿷。
IPA:	[ɕiɪn˧ ɕĩ˥ kɔŋ˥˩ hak̚˧ ɕiɪŋ˥ tiam˧ tiam˧ tʰiã˥]
Pe̍h-ōe-jī:	Sian-siⁿ kóng, ha̍k-seng tiām-tiām thiaⁿ.
Tâi-lô:	Sian-sinn kóng, ha̍k-sing tiām-tiām thiann.
Traditional Chinese:	先生講、學生恬恬聽。
Translation:	A teacher is speaking. Students are quietly listening.

== Unicode support ==
Amongst software/encodings, Nishiki-teki fully supports the system.

Unicode has been able to represent small ku (ㇰ) and small pu (ㇷ゚) since Unicode 3.2, small katakana wo (𛅦) since Unicode 12.0, and tone signs since Unicode 14.0 (2021).

It also requires the use of the combining overline and combining dot below with kana to represent overlined and underdotted kana (like so: チ̅, ツ̣). Font support for these small kana and for sensible rendering of these uncommon combining sequences is in practice limited; overlines are simulated in the tables above using markup.

Kana Extended-B^{[1]}^{[2]} Official Unicode Consortium code chart (PDF)
	0	1	2	3	4	5	6	7	8	9	A	B	C	D	E	F
U+1AFFx	𚿰	𚿱	𚿲	𚿳		𚿵	𚿶	𚿷	𚿸	𚿹	𚿺	𚿻		𚿽	𚿾	
Notes 1.As of Unicode version 18.0 2.Grey areas indicate non-assigned code points

== Sources ==
- Ogawa Naoyoshi, ed. (1931–1932). 臺日大辭典. 上卷 [Taiwanese-Japanese Dictionary] (in Japanese and Taiwanese Hokkien). Vol. 1. Taihoku: Governor-General of Taiwan.
  - Ogawa Naoyoshi, ed. (1931–1932). 臺日大辭典. 下卷 [Taiwanese-Japanese Dictionary] (in Japanese and Taiwanese Hokkien). Vol. 2. Taihoku: Governor-General of Taiwan.
