= Bbánlám pìngyīm =

Romanization system for the Amoy version of the Hokkien Southern Min language

Bbánlám Uē Pìngyīm Hōng'àn (Chinese: 閩南話拼音方案; Pe̍h-ōe-jī: Bân-lâm Ōe Pheng-im Hong-àn), Bbánlám pìngyīm, Minnan pinyin or simply pingyim, is a romanization system for Hokkien Southern Min, in particular the Amoy (Xiamen) version of this language. This romanization system was devised at Xiamen University and first published in the 1982 普通話閩南方言詞典 (Mandarin-Hokkien Dictionary).

== Names ==
Various names are used such as Bbínpīn Hōngàn (Chinese: 閩拼方案), BbínPīn or BP (閩拼). It is commonly known as Pumindian (普閩典) in Taiwan, named after the Mandarin-Southern Min Dictionary (simplified Chinese: 普通话闽南语词典; traditional Chinese: 普通話閩南語詞典; pinyin: Pǔtōnghuà Mǐnnányǔ Cídiǎn) where the system is used, but the formal Chinese name is Southern Min Language Spelling System (闽南话拼音方案; 閩南話拼音方案; Mǐnnán Huà Pīnyīn Fāng'àn).

== Alphabet ==
The BP alphabet adopts the Latin alphabet of 20 letters, 5 digraphs and 5 diacritics to express the basic sounds of the Min Nan language:

bp capital letter	A	B	Bb	C	D	E	G	Gg	H	I	K	L	M	N	Ng	O	Oo	P	S	T	U	W	Y	Z	Zz
bp lower case	a	b	bb	c	d	e	g	gg	h	i	k	l	m	n	ng	o	oo	p	s	t	u	w	y	z	zz
