= Hui'an (disambiguation) =

Hui'an is a county in southern Fujian, China.

Hui'an may also refer to:

- Empress Hui'an (died 866?), concubine of Emperor Yizong of Tang
- Muzha (mythology), Chinese mythological character, also known as Hui'an

== See also ==
- Hui'an dialect from Hui'an
- Hui'an maidens from Hui'an
- Huai'an (disambiguation)
