= Hokkien numerals =

Words used to denote numbers in Hokkien

- Numerals
- Hàn-jī: 數字
- Pe̍h-ōe-jī: Sò͘-lī / Sò͘-jī
- Tâi-lô: Sòo-lī / Sòo-jī

The Hokkien language (incl. Taiwanese) has two regularly used sets of numerals, a more ancient colloquial/vernacular or native Hokkien system and a literary system.

The more ancient vernacular numerals are the native numbers of Hokkien that trace back to Hokkien's origins itself, which is a Coastal Min language that spread southwest across the coast of Fujian from around the Min River. It was brought by the earliest Min-speaking Han Chinese settlers from the time of the Jin dynasty (266–420) settling the area around the Jin River around 284 AD. Meanwhile, the literary system came from Tang-era Classical Chinese/Middle Chinese that was loaned in for formal reading use during medieval times (e.g. Tang, Min, Southern Tang, Song dynasty times), similar to the Sino-Xenic pronunciations in Japanese, Okinawan, Korean, Jeju, Vietnamese, etc, but within the Sinitic family to the Min group.

Literary and colloquial systems are not totally mutually independent; they are sometimes mixed used. The specific pronunciation of each number depends on the specific dialect of Hokkien (e.g. Amoy-Tong'an, Quanzhou, Zhangzhou, Longyan, etc.), which each dialect may either share or use slightly different phonemes and tones on how each dialect may properly count numbers in the Hokkien language for both vernacular and literary systems.

== Basic numerals ==
Number	Literary system (Note: Based on Tang dynasty Classical Chinese/Middle Chinese loaned for formal reading during medieval times)					Colloquial or vernacular system (Note: Based on the average colloquial spoken language of Hokkien with more ancient roots brought by the earliest Min-speaking Han Chinese settlers from around the Min River from the time of the Jin dynasty (266–420) settling the area around the Jin River)					Notes
Number	Hàn-jī / Hàn-lī	Amoy / Xiamen (POJ / TL)	Quanzhou (POJ / TL)	Zhangzhou (POJ / TL)	Longyan (POJ / TL)	Hàn-jī / Hàn-lī	Amoy / Xiamen (POJ / TL)	Quanzhou (POJ / TL)	Zhangzhou (POJ / TL)	Longyan (POJ / TL)	Notes
0	零 / 〇	lêng / lîng	lêng / lîng	lêng / lîng	?	空 / 〇	khòng	khòng	khòng	?	
0	零 / 〇	[liɪŋ²⁴]	[liɪŋ²⁴]	[liɪŋ¹³]	[?]	空 / 〇	[kʰɔŋ²¹]	[kʰɔŋ⁴¹]	[kʰɔŋ²¹]	[?]	
1	一	it	it	it	it	蜀 / 一	chi̍t / tsi̍t	chi̍t / tsi̍t	chi̍t / tsi̍t	chi̍t / tsi̍t	et (一) as in [et̚⁴] and che̍t (蜀) as in [t͡set̚²³] are used in the Hui'an dialect
1	一	[it̚³²]	[it̚⁵]	[it̚³²]	[it̚⁵]	蜀 / 一	[t͡sit̚⁴]	[t͡sit̚²⁴]	[t͡sit̚¹²¹]	[t͡sit̚³²]	et (一) as in [et̚⁴] and che̍t (蜀) as in [t͡set̚²³] are used in the Hui'an dialect
2	二	lī	lī	jī	li	兩	nn̄g	nňg	nō͘ / nōo	?	gī (二) is also used in the Taichung dialect in Taiwan
2	二	[li²²]	[li⁴¹]	[d͡zi²²]	[li³³⁴]	兩	[nŋ̍²²]	[nŋ̍²²]	[nɔ̃²²]	[?]	gī (二) is also used in the Taichung dialect in Taiwan
3	三	sam	sam	sam	?	三	saⁿ / sann	saⁿ / sann	saⁿ / sann	?	
3	三	[sam⁴⁴]	[sam³³]	[sam⁴⁴]	[?]	三	[sã⁴⁴]	[sã³³]	[sã⁴⁴]	[?]	
4	四	sù	sìr	sù	sìr	四	sì	sì	sì	sì	sì (四) as in [si⁴¹] is also used literarily in the Jinjiang dialect and Philippine Hokkien
4	四	[su²¹]	[sɯ⁴¹]	[su²¹]	[sz̩²¹³]	四	[si²¹]	[si⁴¹]	[si²¹]	[si²¹³]	sì (四) as in [si⁴¹] is also used literarily in the Jinjiang dialect and Philippine Hokkien
5	五	ngó͘ / ngóo	gó͘ / góo	ngó͘ / ngóo	gú	五	gō͘ / gōo	gǒ͘ / gǒo	gō͘ / gōo	ňg	
5	五	[ŋɔ̃⁵³]	[ɡɔ⁵⁵⁴]	[ŋɔ̃⁵³]	[ɡu²¹]	五	[ɡɔ²²]	[ɡɔ²²]	[ɡɔ²²]	[ŋ̍⁵³]	
6	六	lio̍k	lio̍k	lio̍k	?	六	la̍k	la̍k	la̍k	?	
6	六	[liɔk̚⁴]	[liɔk̚²⁴]	[liɔk̚¹²¹]	[?]	六	[lak̚⁴]	[lak̚²⁴]	[lak̚¹²¹]	[?]	
7	七	chhit / tshit	chhit / tshit	chhit / tshit	chhit / tshit	七	chhit / tshit	chhit / tshit; chhiak / tshiak	chhit / tshit	chhit / tshit	chhet (七) as in [t͡sʰet̚⁴] is used in the Hui'an dialect; sit (七) as in [sit̚³²] is used in the Zhangpu dialect
7	七	[t͡sʰit̚³²]	[t͡sʰit̚⁵]	[t͡sʰit̚³²]	[t͡sʰit̚⁵]	七	[t͡sʰit̚³²]	[t͡sʰit̚⁵]; [t͡sʰiak̚⁵]	[t͡sʰit̚³²]	[t͡sʰit̚⁵]	chhet (七) as in [t͡sʰet̚⁴] is used in the Hui'an dialect; sit (七) as in [sit̚³²] is used in the Zhangpu dialect
8	八	pat	pat	pat	pat	八	poeh / pueh	poeh / pueh	peh	piē	
8	八	[pat̚³²]	[pat̚⁵]	[pat̚³²]	[pat̚⁵]	八	[pueʔ³²]	[pueʔ⁵]	[peʔ³²]	[pie⁵⁵]	
9	九	kiú	kiú	kiú	?	九	káu	káu	káu	?	
9	九	[kiu⁵³]	[kiu⁵⁵⁴]	[kiu⁵³]	[?]	九	[kau⁵³]	[kau⁵⁵⁴]	[kau⁵³]	[?]	
10	十	si̍p	si̍p	si̍p	?	十	cha̍p / tsa̍p	cha̍p / tsa̍p	cha̍p / tsa̍p	?	se̍p (十) as in [sep̚²³] is used in the Hui'an dialect
10	十	[sip̚⁴]	[sip̚²⁴]	[sip̚¹²¹]	[?]	十	[t͡sap̚⁴]	[t͡sap̚²⁴]	[t͡sap̚¹²¹]	[?]	se̍p (十) as in [sep̚²³] is used in the Hui'an dialect
20	-	-	-	-	-	廿	lia̍p	lia̍p	jia̍p	?	lia̍p (廿) is the univerbation of lī-cha̍p (二十) as in Amoy [li²²⁻²¹ t͡sap̚⁴] and Quanzhou [li⁴¹⁻²² t͡sap̚²⁴]; jia̍p (廿) is the univerbation of jī-cha̍p (二十) as in Zhangzhou [d͡zi²²⁻²¹ t͡sap̚¹²¹]
20	-	-	-	-	-	廿	[liap̚⁴]	[liap̚²⁴]	[d͡ziap̚¹²¹]	[?]	lia̍p (廿) is the univerbation of lī-cha̍p (二十) as in Amoy [li²²⁻²¹ t͡sap̚⁴] and Quanzhou [li⁴¹⁻²² t͡sap̚²⁴]; jia̍p (廿) is the univerbation of jī-cha̍p (二十) as in Zhangzhou [d͡zi²²⁻²¹ t͡sap̚¹²¹]
30	-	-	-	-	-	卅	sa̍p	sa̍p	sa̍p	?	The univerbation of saⁿ-cha̍p (三十)
30	-	-	-	-	-	卅	[sap̚⁴]	[sap̚²⁴]	[sap̚¹²¹]	[?]	The univerbation of saⁿ-cha̍p (三十)
40	-	-	-	-	-	卌	siap	siap	siap	?	The univerbation of sì-cha̍p (四十)
40	-	-	-	-	-	卌	[siap̚³²]	[siap̚⁵]	[siap̚³²]	[?]	The univerbation of sì-cha̍p (四十)
70	-	-	-	-	-	竊	chhia̍p / tshia̍p	-	chhia̍p / tshia̍p	?	The univerbation of chhit-cha̍p (七十)
70	-	-	-	-	-	竊	[t͡sʰiap̚⁴]	-	[t͡sʰiap̚¹²¹]	[?]	The univerbation of chhit-cha̍p (七十)
100	百	pek / pik	piak	pek / pik	?	百	pah	pah	peeh	?	
100	百	[piɪk̚³²]	[piak̚⁵]	[piɪk̚³²]	[?]	百	[paʔ³²]	[paʔ⁵]	[pɛʔ³²]	[?]	
1,000	千	chhian / tshian	chhian / tshian	chhian / tshian	?	千	chheng / tshing; chhaiⁿ / tshainn	chhuiⁿ / tshuinn	chheng / tshing; chhan / tshan	?	chheeng (千) as in [t͡sʰɛŋ⁵⁵] is used in the Chawan dialect
1,000	千	[t͡sʰiɛn⁴⁴]	[t͡sʰiɛn³³]	[t͡sʰiɛn⁴⁴]	[?]	千	[t͡sʰiɪŋ⁴⁴]; [t͡sʰãi⁴⁴]	[t͡sʰuĩ³³]	[t͡sʰiɪŋ⁴⁴]; [t͡sʰan⁴⁴]	[?]	chheeng (千) as in [t͡sʰɛŋ⁵⁵] is used in the Chawan dialect
10^{4}	萬	bān	bān	bān	?	-	-	-	-	-	cha̍p-chheng (十千) is used in Penang, Southern Peninsular Malaysian, and Singaporean Hokkien, together with bān (萬)
10^{4}	萬	[ban²²]	[ban⁴¹]	[ban²²]	[?]	-	-	-	-	-	cha̍p-chheng (十千) is used in Penang, Southern Peninsular Malaysian, and Singaporean Hokkien, together with bān (萬)
10^{5}	十萬	cha̍p-bān / tsa̍p-bān	cha̍p-bān / tsa̍p-bān	cha̍p-bān / tsa̍p-bān	?	-	-	-	-	-	pah-chheng (百千) as in [paʔ⁵ t͡sʰiɪŋ³³] is used in Philippine Hokkien, instead of cha̍p-bān (十萬)
10^{5}	十萬	[t͡sap̚⁴⁻³² ban²²]	[t͡sap̚²⁴⁻² ban⁴¹]	[t͡sap̚¹²¹⁻²¹ ban²²]	[?]	-	-	-	-	-	pah-chheng (百千) as in [paʔ⁵ t͡sʰiɪŋ³³] is used in Philippine Hokkien, instead of cha̍p-bān (十萬)
10^{6}	百萬	pah-bān	pah-bān	pah-bān	?	-	-	-	-	-	tháng (桶) as in [tʰaŋ⁵⁵⁴] and bīn-tháng (面桶) as in [bin²² tʰaŋ⁵⁵⁴] are used in Philippine Hokkien, instead of pah-bān (百萬)
10^{6}	百萬	[pa(ʔ)³²⁻⁵³ ban²²]	[pa(ʔ)⁵ ban⁴¹]	[pa(ʔ)³²⁻⁵³ ban²²]	[?]	-	-	-	-	-	tháng (桶) as in [tʰaŋ⁵⁵⁴] and bīn-tháng (面桶) as in [bin²² tʰaŋ⁵⁵⁴] are used in Philippine Hokkien, instead of pah-bān (百萬)
10^{7}	千萬	chheng-bān / tshing-bān; chhian-bān / tshian-bān	chhian-bān / tshian-bān; chhuiⁿ-bān / tshuinn-bān	chheng-bān / tshing-bān; chhian-bān / tshian-bān	?	-	-	-	-	-	cha̍p-tháng (十桶) as in [t͡sap̚² tʰaŋ⁵⁵⁴] and cha̍p-bīn-tháng (十面桶) as in [t͡sap̚² bin²² tʰaŋ⁵⁵⁴] are used in Philippine Hokkien, instead of chheng-bān (千萬)
10^{7}	千萬	[t͡sʰiɪŋ⁴⁴⁻²² ban²²]; [t͡sʰiɛn⁴⁴⁻²² ban²²]	[t͡sʰiɛn³³ ban⁴¹]; [t͡sʰuĩ³³ ban⁴¹]	[t͡sʰiɪŋ⁴⁴⁻²² ban²²]; [t͡sʰiɛn⁴⁴⁻²² ban²²]	[?]	-	-	-	-	-	cha̍p-tháng (十桶) as in [t͡sap̚² tʰaŋ⁵⁵⁴] and cha̍p-bīn-tháng (十面桶) as in [t͡sap̚² bin²² tʰaŋ⁵⁵⁴] are used in Philippine Hokkien, instead of chheng-bān (千萬)
10^{8}	億	ek / ik	iak	ek / ik	?	-	-	-	-	-	pah-tháng (百桶) as in [paʔ⁵ tʰaŋ⁵⁵⁴] and pah-bīn-tháng (百面桶) as in [paʔ⁵ bin²² tʰaŋ⁵⁵⁴] are used in Philippine Hokkien, instead or along with iak (億)
10^{8}	億	[iɪk̚³²]	[iak̚⁵]	[iɪk̚³²]	[?]	-	-	-	-	-	pah-tháng (百桶) as in [paʔ⁵ tʰaŋ⁵⁵⁴] and pah-bīn-tháng (百面桶) as in [paʔ⁵ bin²² tʰaŋ⁵⁵⁴] are used in Philippine Hokkien, instead or along with iak (億)
10^{12}	兆*	tiāu	tiǎu	tiāu	?	-	-	-	-	-	*tiāu (兆) as in [tiau³³] for trillion is chiefly used in Taiwanese Hokkien From now on, see Chinese numerals
10^{12}	兆*	[tiau²²]	[tiau²²]	[tiau²²]	[?]	-	-	-	-	-	*tiāu (兆) as in [tiau³³] for trillion is chiefly used in Taiwanese Hokkien From now on, see Chinese numerals
10^{16}	京	keng / king	keng / king	keng / king	?	-	-	-	-	-	
10^{16}	京	[kiɪŋ⁴⁴]	[kiɪŋ³³]	[kiɪŋ⁴⁴]	[?]	-	-	-	-	-	
10^{20}	垓	kai	?	?	?	-	-	-	-	-	
10^{20}	垓	[kai⁴⁴]	[?]	[?]	[?]	-	-	-	-	-	
10^{24}	秭	chí / tsí	?	?	?	-	-	-	-	-	
10^{24}	秭	[t͡si⁵³]	[?]	[?]	[?]	-	-	-	-	-	
10^{28}	穰	jiông	?	?	?	-	-	-	-	-	
10^{28}	穰	[d͡ziɔŋ²⁴]	[?]	[?]	[?]	-	-	-	-	-	
10^{32}	溝	ko͘ / koo	kio	ko͘ / koo	?	-	-	-	-	-	
10^{32}	溝	[kɔ⁴⁴]	[kio³³]	[kɔ⁴⁴]	[?]	-	-	-	-	-	
10^{36}	澗	kàn	kàn	kàn	?	-	-	-	-	-	
10^{36}	澗	[kan²¹]	[kan⁴¹]	[kan²¹]	[?]	-	-	-	-	-	
10^{40}	正	chèng / tsìng	chèng / tsìng	chèng / tsìng	?	-	-	-	-	-	
10^{40}	正	[t͡siɪŋ²¹]	[t͡siɪŋ⁴¹]	[t͡siɪŋ²¹]	[?]	-	-	-	-	-	
10^{44}	載	cháiⁿ / tsáinn	cháiⁿ / tsáinn	cháiⁿ / tsáinn	?	-	-	-	-	-	
10^{44}	載	[t͡sãi⁵³]	[t͡sãi⁵⁵⁴]	[t͡sãi⁵³]	[?]	-	-	-	-	-	

== Cardinal numbers ==
For cardinal numbers usage, the colloquial system is usually used. For example, one should use chi̍t ê lâng for the meaning of "a person" instead of using *it ê lâng. However, a notable exceptions for numerals 1 and 2 appears while the number is greater than 10.

Situation \ Numeral	0	1	2	3	4	5	6	7	8	9	10
Less than 10	lêng	it / et	jī / lī / gī	sam	sù / sìr / sì	ngó͘ / gó͘ / gú	lio̍k	chhit / chhet / sit / chhiak	pat	kiú	si̍p / se̍p
Less than 10	khòng	chi̍t / che̍t	nn̄g / nňg / nō͘	saⁿ	sì	gō͘ / gǒ͘ / ňg	la̍k	chhit / chhet / sit / chhiak	poeh / peh / piē	káu	cha̍p
Greater than 10	lêng	it / et	jī / lī / gī	sam	sù / sìr / sì	ngó͘ / gó͘ / gú	lio̍k	chhit / chhet / sit / chhiak	pat	kiú	si̍p / se̍p
Greater than 10	khòng	chi̍t / che̍t	nn̄g / nňg / nō͘	saⁿ	sì	gō͘ / gǒ͘ / ňg	la̍k	chhit / chhet / sit / chhiak	poeh / peh / piē	káu	cha̍p

For "few hundred and ten, twenty or thirty" or "few thousand and few hundred", in Hokkien the prefixes pah- or chheng- are used instead of the lengthy way, which requires the speaker to state "how many chheng, how many pah, and how many cha̍p".

In the table, n is substituted by chi̍t, nn̄g/nňg, saⁿ, sì, gō͘/gǒ͘, la̍k, chhit, peh/poeh, káu
	10	20	30	40	50	60	70	80	90
Pah-	n-pah-it	n-pah-lī / jī	n-pah-saⁿ	n-pah-sì	n-pah-gō͘ / gǒ͘	n-pah-la̍k	n-pah-chhit	n-pah-poeh / peh	n-pah-káu
	100	200	300	400	500	600	700	800	900
Chheng-	n-chheng-it	n-chheng-lī / jī	n-chheng-saⁿ	n-chheng-sì	n-chheng-gō͘ / gǒ͘	n-chheng-la̍k	n-chheng-chhit	n-chheng-poeh / peh	n-chheng-káu

== Fractional numerals ==
For expressing fractions, one should use the sentence pattern like "cardinal number + hun-chi + cardinal number"; for example, gō͘ hun-chi it (五分之一) for "one fifth" (1/5). Note that the colloquial set of numerals is used in fractional numerals with still the exception of numerals 1 and 2, which should use the literary set as it and jī.

For expressing decimals, one should only use the literary numeral set with tiám (點) for the decimal mark. For example, one may say π equals sam tiám it-sù-it-ngó͘-kiú-jī-lio̍k-ngó͘-sam (3.141592653).

In addition, some special fraction can be expressed in other simpler forms. For percentage, one can still use the sentence pattern of hun-chi as pah hun-chi cha̍p (百分之十) for "ten percent" in most situations; however, for native speakers, the suffix -siâⁿ (成) for "n×10 percents" is used more commonly, so the "twenty percents" should be nn̄g-siâⁿ (兩成). Note that the numeral set used with the suffix -siâⁿ is totally the colloquial one with no exception.

In Taiwan, the term pha-sian-to͘ is also used for fractional numerals, but one should use the sentence term as "cardinal number + ê pha-sian-to͘"; for example, chhit-cha̍p ê pha-sian-to͘ (70%). The term was introduced in Japanese rule era from Japanese language; it's a Japanese loanword originating from English with the meaning of "percent" (paasento; パーセント). The use of pha-sian-to͘ is sometimes simplified as a suffix -pha; for example, cha̍p-peh-pha (18%).

== Ordinal numbers ==
For ordinal numbers, when the numerals are preceded by the prefix tē (第), the colloquial set is used with the exception of numeral 1 and 2; when the numerals are preceded by the prefix thâu (頭), there is no exception to use the colloquial set when the number is smaller than 10, but once the number is greater than 10, the exception of numeral 1 and 2 appears again. Note that the system with prefix thâu is usually added by counter words, and it means "the first few"; for example, thâu-gō͘ pái means "the first five times". Thâu-chhit (number seven) sometimes means thâu-chhit kang (first seven days). It means the first seven days after a person died, which is a Hokkien cultural noun that should usually be avoided.

=== Smaller than 10 ===
Prefix \ Numeral	1	2	3	4	5	6	7	8	9	10
tē-	it / et	jī / lī / gī	sam	sù / sìr / sì	ngó͘ / gó͘ / gú	lio̍k	chhit / chhet / sit / chhiak	pat	kiú	si̍p / se̍p
tē-	chi̍t / che̍t	nn̄g / nňg / nō͘	saⁿ	sì	gō͘ / gǒ͘ / ňg	la̍k	chhit / chhet / sit / chhiak	poeh / peh / piē	káu	cha̍p
thâu-	it / et	jī / lī / gī	sam	sù / sìr / sì	ngó͘ / gó͘ / gú	lio̍k	chhit / chhet / sit / chhiak	pat	kiú	si̍p / se̍p
thâu-	chi̍t / che̍t	nn̄g / nňg / nō͘	saⁿ	sì	gō͘ / gǒ͘ / ňg	la̍k	chhit / chhet / sit / chhiak	poeh / peh / piē	káu	cha̍p

=== Greater than 10 ===
Prefix \ Numeral	1	2	3	4	5	6	7	8	9	n×10
tē-	it / et	jī / lī / gī	sam	sù / sìr / sì	ngó͘ / gó͘ / gú	lio̍k	chhit / chhet / sit / chhiak	pat	kiú	si̍p / se̍p
tē-	chi̍t / che̍t	nn̄g / nňg / nō͘	saⁿ	sì	gō͘ / gǒ͘ / ňg	la̍k	chhit / chhet / sit / chhiak	poeh / peh / piē	káu	cha̍p
thâu-	it / et	jī / lī / gī	sam	sù / sìr / sì	ngó͘ / gó͘ / gú	lio̍k	chhit / chhet / sit / chhiak	pat	kiú	si̍p / se̍p
thâu-	chi̍t / che̍t	nn̄g / nňg / nō͘	saⁿ	sì	gō͘ / gǒ͘ / ňg	la̍k	chhit / chhet / sit / chhiak	poeh / peh / piē	káu	cha̍p

== See also ==
- Hokkien counter word
- Suzhou numerals
