= Xu Shihui =

Chinese billionaire businessman and politician (born 1958)

- Born: 許世輝; 1958 (age 67–68)
- Occupations: Chairman, Dali Foods Group
- Spouse: Chen Liling
- Children: Xu Yangyang

Xu Shihui (Chinese: 許世輝; Pe̍h-ōe-jī: Khó͘ Sè-hui; born 1958) is a Chinese businessman, politician and a representative of the Fujian region at the 12th National People's Congress.

He is the founder and chairman of Dali Foods Group, a food and drink company. As of November 2023, he and his family was worth $7.9 billion.

== Biography ==
Xu Shihui was born in Hui'an, Fujian province. His father was a laborer.

He got a job at Dali, cookie business in Quanzhou, when it was a collective and amassed shares by proving that he was a leader. This business would later become Fujian Dali Foods Group. He serves as group's chairman since 1992.

He has served as a deputy to the National People's Congress since 2008. In 2013, he served as a deputy to the National People's Congress.

In 2015, Dali Foods Group was listed on Hong Kong Stock Exchange.

In 2016, he was ranked 20th in Forbes' China Rich List with a fortune of $6.3 billion. In 2019, he and his family had a fortune of $9.3 billion. In 2020, Forbes estimated his net worth at US$8.8 billion.

In July 2023, he announced the plan to delist the company from the Hong Kong Stock Exchange. In August, his plan was approved by shareholders. The deal was valued at $6.6 billion. He paid a premium of 38% on closing price.

== Personal life ==
He lives in Quanzhou, China. He is married to Chen Liling and has a daughter with her, Xu Yangyang, who is Dali's vice president.
