= Huai'an (disambiguation) =

Huai'an is a prefecture-level city in Jiangsu, China.

Huai'an may also refer to:

- Huai'an District, in Huai'an, Jiangsu, China
- Huai'an County, in Zhangjiakou, Hebei, China

== See also ==
- Hui'an County, Fujian, China
