= Dali Foods Group =

Chinese food company

Dali Foods Group Co., Ltd.
- Native name: 达利食品集团有限公司
- Type: Privately held company
- Industry: Food
- Founded: 1989
- Founder: Xu Shihui
- Headquarters: Hui'an County, Quanzhou, Fujian, China.
- Area served: China
- Key people: Xu Shihui
- Products: Copico chips

Dali Foods Group
- Traditional Chinese: 達利食品集團有限公司
- Simplified Chinese: 达利食品集团有限公司
Transcriptions
Standard Mandarin
- Hanyu Pinyin: Dálì Shípǐn Jítuán Yǒuxiàngōngsī

Dali Foods Group is a baked goods company in China. Its headquarters are in Hui'an County, Quanzhou, Fujian, China.

Dali Foods is known for its low-cost snacks which are sold by more than 6,500 distributors across the country. Their best known brands are its Copico potato chips (可比克; Kěbǐkè), Heqizheng herbal tea and Haochidian soda crackers.

== History ==
The company was founded by Xu Shisui in 1989 in Quanzhou.

In 2004 it began construction of a biscuit processing plant in Changchun, Jilin Province. The total budget for construction of the factory was 19 million euros, with the first phase of the project accounting for 11 million euros and the second phase, consisting of eight production lines, accounting for the remainder.

In 2015, the company raised $1.15 billion from a public float in its initial public offering on the Hong Kong Stock Exchange. It was the largest offering by any Chinese privately owned enterprise in 2015.

In 2022, the company launched a new soy milk brand called Plant Organic to improve its market positioning.

In June 2023, its chairman Xu Shisui announced his privatization plan for the company. In August 2023, shareholders approved the privatization of the $6.5 billion company. Xu offered to take the company private at HK$3.75 a share, which was a 38% premium.
