= Chongwu Army Temple =

Temple in Chongwu, Fujian Province, China

Coordinates: 24°53′00″N 118°55′10″E

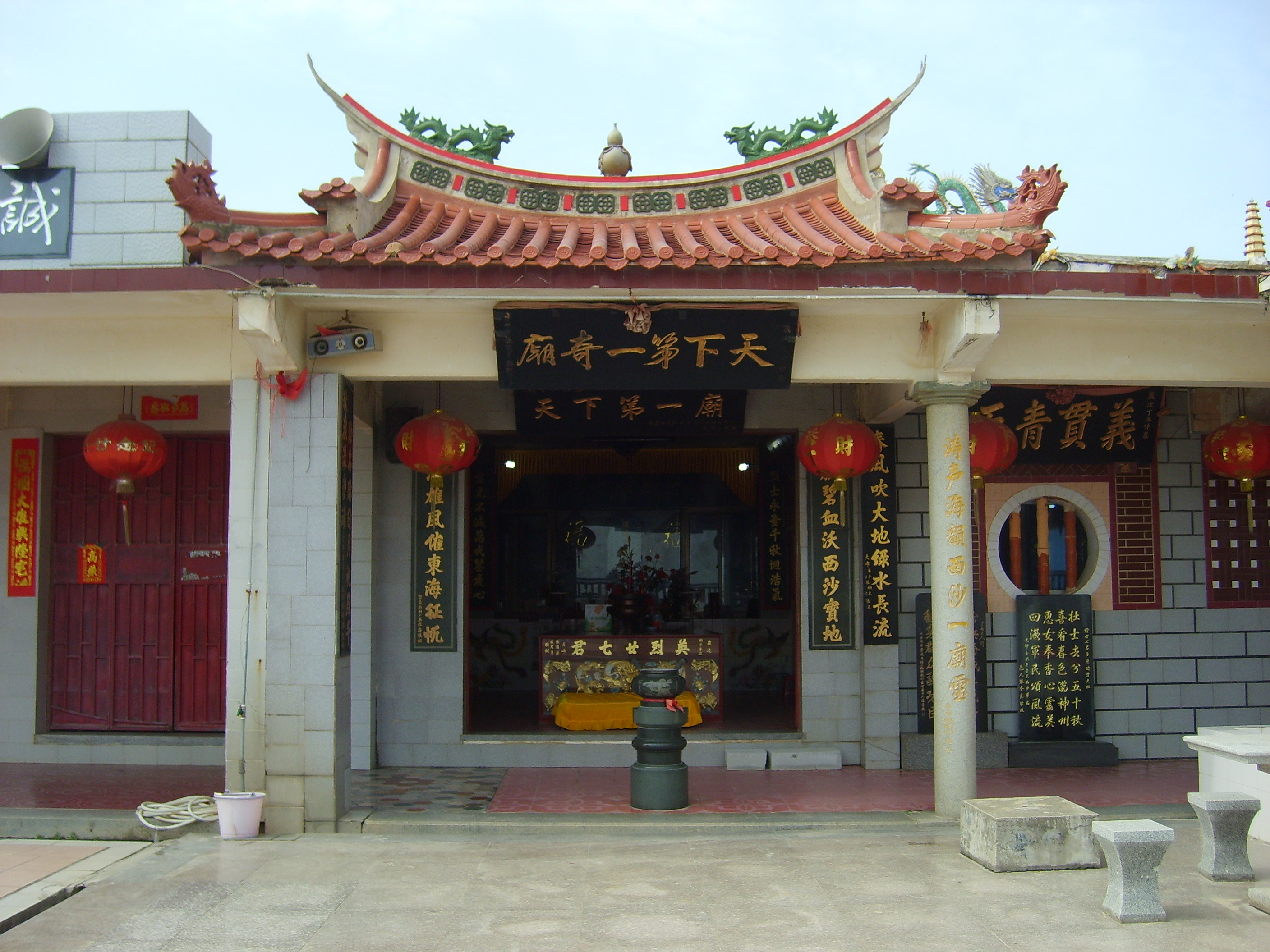
The Chongwu Army Temple as photographed in 2008

The Chongwu Army Temple, also known as the Temple of the People's Liberation Army or PLA Temple (解放军庙), is a building which serves as half a secular shrine to fallen soldiers of China's People's Liberation Army and half a Buddhist temple. Built in 1996 by Zeng Hen, the temple stands in Chongwu, Fujian Province, China. It honors twenty-seven PLA soldiers killed by an attack from Nationalist forces in 1949, including soldiers killed while protecting Zeng.

== Origins ==
On September 17, 1949, Nationalist forces from Taiwan attacked Chongwu during the Chinese Civil War. The attack occurred when a PLA brigade was preparing to depart Chongwu beach for a landing on Jinmen and Xiamen islands. A teenaged girl named Zeng Hen was also walking on the beach during the attack. Five PLA soldiers threw themselves on top of Zeng to protect her and were killed. Sources variously attribute the source of the bombardment that Zeng survived as an attack from a Nationalist ship or plane.

After the attack, Chongwu residents buried the soldiers and, in the local custom, built a simple shrine of straw and thatch. Until this first shrine was torn down during a Maoist political campaign in 1971, residents worshipped at the shrine and burned incense and paper money.

== Establishment ==
Zeng Hen planned to commemorate the PLA soldiers who saved her. After a prolonged struggle with local authorities, Zeng Hen acquired the site where the attack took place. She raised over 600,000 yuan in donations, and contributed 60,000 yuan of her own savings, ultimately succeeding in building the temple in 1996. The more modest 1996 temple was replaced with a more elaborate structure in 2005. Zeng and her children manage the temple.

The site is half devoted to the nominally secular commemoration of the twenty-seven PLA soldiers and half a Buddhist temple. The temple complex covers 2,500 square meters. It consists of a main hall, a memorial hall, two pavilions, a residence for the Zeng family, and a statute of a soldier holding a girl in his arms. The temple's outward appearance is typical of temples dedicated to local deities in southeast China.

The temple's altar bears twenty-seven wooden figures representing a military unit. Behind them is an inscription in the style of a traditional spirit tablet which reads, "People's Liberation Army Martyrs."

== Cultural and political significance ==
The Chinese Communist Party and the Chinese government explicitly support the temple. In 2017, Chinese state television broadcast a documentary about the temple and Zeng Hen's story. High-ranking PLA officers have visited the temple, including Major General Shao Hua, daughter-in-law of Mao Zedong. The local PLA garrison visits regularly. Academic Jifeng Liu writes that the temple is included in Party study materials, consistent with Xi Jinping's goals of building a "new 'Communist civil religion.'"

Some Chongwu locals venerate the twenty-seven PLA martyrs as deities who can perform miracles.

The authenticity of Zeng Hen's story is disputed by two other Chongwu sites which venerate the twenty-seven PLA soldiers, the Martyr's Palace and the Memorial Hall.

As of December 9, 2022, the identities of twenty-five of the PLA soldiers honored at the temple have been confirmed.
