= Hokkien counter word =

- Counter word
- Hàn-jī: 量詞
- Pe̍h-ōe-jī: Liōng-sû
- Tâi-lô: liōng-sû

In Hokkien, counter words (Hàn-jī: 量詞; Pe̍h-ōe-jī: liōng-sû) are words used with numerals to count or quantify people, objects, events, periods of time, and other items. Different counter words are used for different types of nouns or units; for example, lâng (儂) is used for people, pún (本) for books and magazines, and tiám-cheng (點鐘) for hours. The general counter ê (个) can be used with most countable nouns.

Counter-word constructions generally use the colloquial forms of Hokkien numerals. In numbers greater than ten, however, 1 and 2 take their literary rather than colloquial readings; for example, 11 is cha̍p-it (十一) and 22 is jī-cha̍p-jī (二十二). Hokkien has numerous specialized counters for particular classes of nouns and units.

== Table of the traditional numerals ==
For counter words, the colloquial set of the Hokkien numerals system is used with the exception of 1 and 2 when the number is greater than 10; for example, one should say cha̍p-it (十一) and jī-cha̍p-jī (二十二) for 11 and 22 instead of cha̍p-chi̍t (十蜀) and nn̄g-cha̍p-nn̄g (兩十兩), which have no actual meaning. For 0, bô (無, meaning "nothing") is sometimes used, but it is usually needless to count 0.

Numeral	Hokkien		
Numeral	Hàn-jī	Pe̍h-ōe-jī	
Numeral	Hàn-jī	Literary system	Vernacular system
0	零 / 空	lêng	khòng
1	一 / 蜀	it / et	chi̍t / che̍t
2	二 / 兩	jī / lī / gī	nn̄g / nňg / nō͘
3	三	sam	saⁿ
4	四	sù / sìr / sì	sì
5	五	ngó͘ / gó͘ / gú	gō͘ / gǒ͘ / ňg
6	六	lio̍k	la̍k
7	七	chhit	chhit
8	八	pat	poeh / peh / piē
9	九	kiú	káu
10	十	si̍p / se̍p	cha̍p

== Common counters by category ==
Pe̍h-ōe-jī	Hàn-jī	Use examples
ê	个	The Hokkien counter word ê is available for most countable nouns.
People and Things
bué/bé/bér	尾	Fish (hî/hû/hîr)
châng	欉	Tree, plant
chiah	隻	Animals, bicycles (thih-bé), boats (chûn)
hāng	項	Events (tāi-chì), things (mi̍h-kiāⁿ)
keng	間	Rooms (pâng-keng), classrooms (kàu-sek), houses (chhù), schools (ha̍k-hāu), companies (kong-si)
ki	枝	Pen (pit), branch (chhiū-ki), leg (kha), arm (chhiú), strand of hair (thaû-mňg, chhiu), mouth (chhuì)
lâng	儂	People
lia̍p	粒	Fruits, mountains (soaⁿ)
pún	本	Books (chheh), comic books (ang-á-chheh), magazines (cha̍p-chì)
tâi	台	Bicycles (kha-ta̍h-chhia), cars (chhia), machines (ki-khì), mechanical devices, household appliances
tiâu	條	Lines (soàⁿ), songs (koa), railway (thih-lō͘)
tíng	頂	Hat (bō-á), cars (chhia) in some variants
ūi	位	People (polite)
Time, Calendar, etc.
bió	秒	Seconds
goe̍h / ge̍h / ge̍rh / gǒe / gōe / gēr	月	Months of the year (see also: kò-goe̍h)
hun	分	Minutes
hun-cheng	分鐘	Minutes
li̍t / le̍t / ji̍t / gi̍t	日	Days
kang	工	Days
kò-goe̍h / kò-ge̍h	個月	Months
lé-pài	禮拜	Weeks
mê / mî	暝	Nights
nî	年	Years
tang	冬	Years
tiám-cheng	點鐘	Hours

== Extended list of counters ==
Pe̍h-ōe-jī	Hàn-jī	Use examples
au	甌	cup
ba̍k	目	section
goe̍h-ji̍t	月日	Months
hôe	回	Events, behaviors, times, frequency, novel paragraphs
hō͘	戶	Families
ia̍h	頁	Pages
ke	家	Families
keⁿ / kiⁿ	更	1 keⁿ equals 2 hours
kiāⁿ	件	Baggage (hêng-lí), events (tāi-chì)
kńg	卷	Roll stuffs
kûn	群	Groups, people (lâng)
khu	坵	Paddy fields (chhân)
pak	幅	drawings (tô͘)
pa̍k	縛	Bundles, bunches
pî	枇	Bunches of bananas (keng-chio), mullets (o͘-hî-chí), cluster-like items
pō͘	部	Departments (pō͘-bûn) of a company or a government
pōng	磅	1 pōng is 0.454 kilograms.
phiⁿ	篇	Articles (bûn-chiuⁿ)
phō	部	Books, especially for a "set" of books
phoa̍h	袚	Necklace (phoa̍h-liān), chain items (liān-á)
se̍k	席	Seats in a conference or parliament
sian	身	Deities (sîn-bêng), puppets (ang-á), silkworm (niû-á)
sián	仙	Cent
sió-sî	小時	Hours (written)
tha̍h	疊 or 沓	Stacked-like items
thia̍p	疊	Stacked-like items, bricks (chng-á)
thong	通	Telephone calls (tiān-ōe)

== See also ==
- Hokkien numerals
- Chinese classifier
