= Chongwu =

Chongwu 崇武镇
- Town
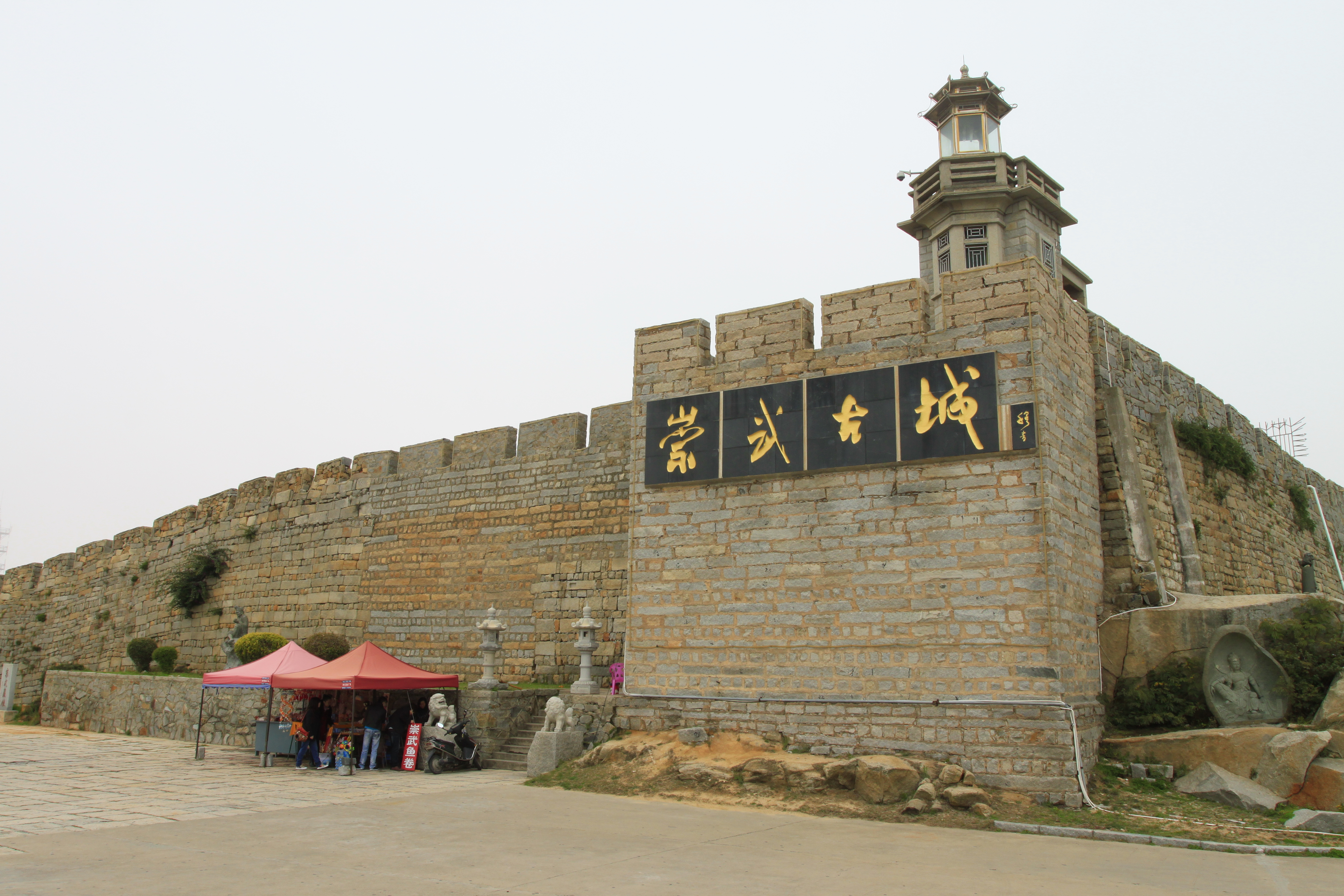
- Chongwu walled city

- Location in Fujian Chongwu (China)
- Coordinates: 24°53′00″N 118°56′00″E
- Country: People's Republic of China
- Province: Fujian
- Prefecture-level city: Quanzhou
- County: Hui'an
- Time zone: UTC+8 (China Standard)

Chongwu Town (Chinese: 崇武镇) is a township-level division of Hui'an County, Quanzhou Prefecture-level city, Fujian Province, China.

Chongwu Town is in the southeastern part of Hui'an County, on a peninsula jutting into Taiwan Strait. The town's historical center, the Old Chongwu Fortress (Chinese: 崇武古城, Chongwu Gu Cheng) is a walled city dating to the late 14th century (Hongwu Emperor's reign; the conventional date is 1384). The traditional Hui'an County vernacular architecture, making heavy use of the local granite, is largely preserved within the walled city. A large sculpture park is located on the narrow strip south of the fortress, between the city wall and the beach.

A memorial hall and the Chongwu Army temple (解放军庙) on the beach just west of town commemorate an engagement between the PLA infantry and the Nationalist air force that took place here in 1949.

A significant amount of hospitality establishment, from luxury to budget hotels, are located outside the walled city.

Chongwu's eastern peninsula, extending east of central Chongwu into Taiwan Strait, contains a number of fishing and farming villages. Toward the east, the peninsula is split in two by the scenic Ben Ji An Bay (畚箕垵澳). A Neolithic archeological site, Dazuoshan (大岞山新石器时代遗址), is found on the "north fork" of the peninsula.

== Climate ==
Climate data for Chongwu Town, elevation 22 m (72 ft), (1991–2020 normals, extremes 1971–2010)
Month	Jan	Feb	Mar	Apr	May	Jun	Jul	Aug	Sep	Oct	Nov	Dec	Year
Record high °C (°F)	25.2 (77.4)	26.0 (78.8)	25.6 (78.1)	28.2 (82.8)	30.6 (87.1)	32.5 (90.5)	34.7 (94.5)	36.7 (98.1)	35.2 (95.4)	33.7 (92.7)	29.6 (85.3)	25.4 (77.7)	36.7 (98.1)
Mean daily maximum °C (°F)	15.2 (59.4)	15.3 (59.5)	17.4 (63.3)	21.2 (70.2)	25.2 (77.4)	27.9 (82.2)	30.0 (86.0)	30.4 (86.7)	29.6 (85.3)	26.1 (79.0)	22.2 (72.0)	17.6 (63.7)	23.2 (73.7)
Daily mean °C (°F)	12.5 (54.5)	12.4 (54.3)	14.5 (58.1)	18.4 (65.1)	22.7 (72.9)	25.9 (78.6)	27.7 (81.9)	27.9 (82.2)	27.0 (80.6)	23.4 (74.1)	19.5 (67.1)	14.9 (58.8)	20.6 (69.0)
Mean daily minimum °C (°F)	10.6 (51.1)	10.5 (50.9)	12.4 (54.3)	16.3 (61.3)	20.8 (69.4)	24.3 (75.7)	25.9 (78.6)	26.0 (78.8)	24.9 (76.8)	21.4 (70.5)	17.6 (63.7)	13.0 (55.4)	18.6 (65.5)
Record low °C (°F)	−0.3 (31.5)	2.9 (37.2)	2.0 (35.6)	7.0 (44.6)	11.4 (52.5)	16.0 (60.8)	21.6 (70.9)	21.8 (71.2)	16.7 (62.1)	12.9 (55.2)	7.7 (45.9)	2.0 (35.6)	−0.3 (31.5)
Average precipitation mm (inches)	38.5 (1.52)	65.5 (2.58)	93.3 (3.67)	99.0 (3.90)	156.6 (6.17)	182.4 (7.18)	104.7 (4.12)	135.0 (5.31)	96.1 (3.78)	44.0 (1.73)	36.1 (1.42)	37.2 (1.46)	1,088.4 (42.84)
Average precipitation days (≥ 0.1 mm)	6.6	9.0	12.9	12.5	13.5	12.5	6.5	8.5	7.1	3.1	4.5	5.9	102.6
Average relative humidity (%)	74	77	79	82	84	89	86	84	77	71	73	72	79
Mean monthly sunshine hours	131.4	106.5	120.0	130.9	144.1	176.8	268.7	248.0	216.1	204.5	157.7	141.6	2,046.3
Percentage possible sunshine	39	33	32	34	35	43	64	62	59	57	48	43	46
Source: China Meteorological Administrationall-time extreme low

== See also ==
- List of township-level divisions of Fujian
