= Hui'an maidens =

Han Chinese subgroup

Hui'an maidens Hūi-oaⁿ cha-bó͘ 惠安女
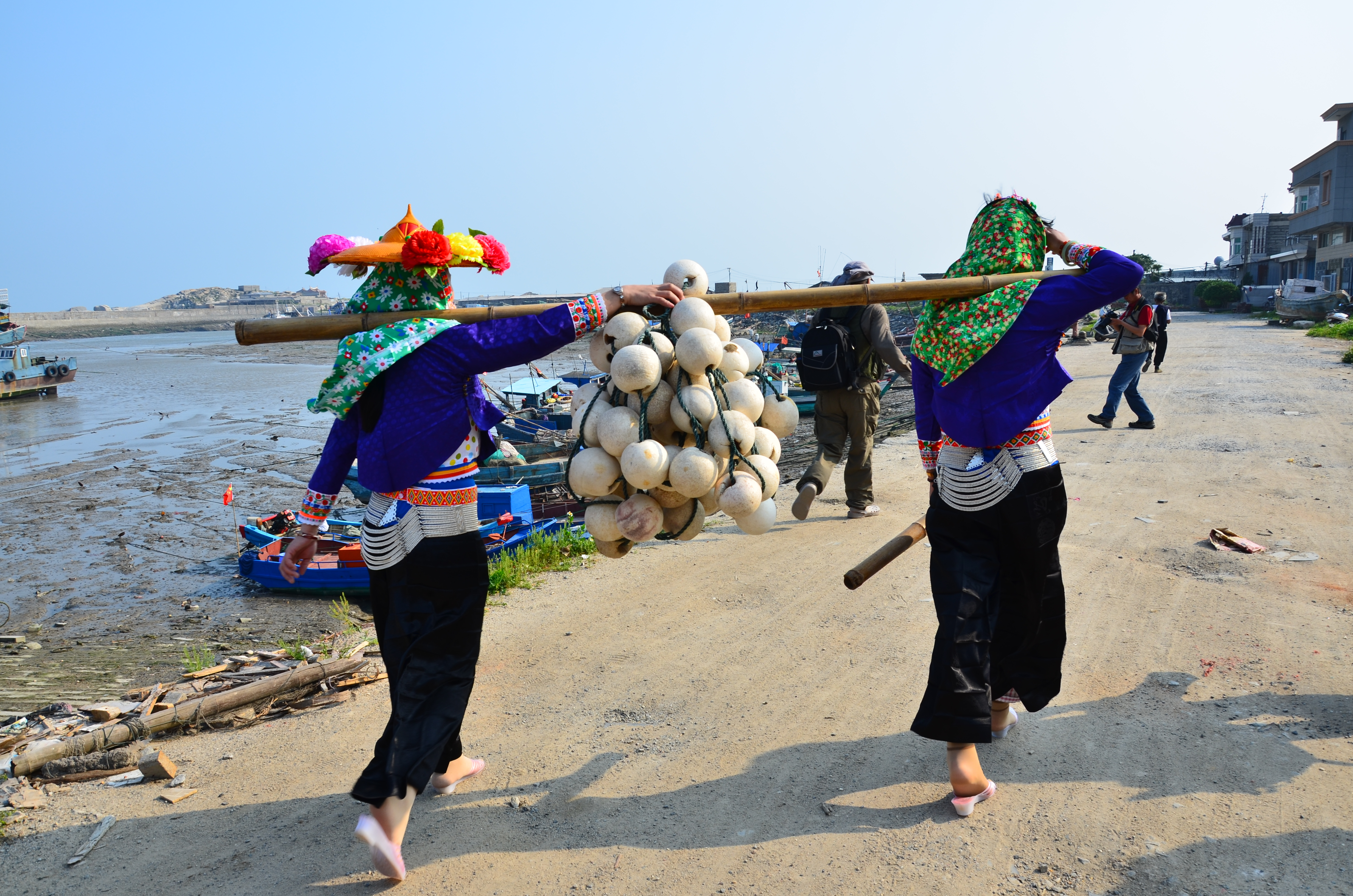
- Hui'an maidens with traditional attire in Hui'an County, Fujian, China.

Total population
- C. tens of thousands

Regions with significant populations
- Hui'an County, Fujian, China

Languages
- Southern Min, Standard Chinese

Religion
- Buddhism, Taoism, Islam

Hui'an maidens or Hui'an women (Chinese: 惠安女; pinyin: Huì'ān nǚ; Pe̍h-ōe-jī: Hūi-oaⁿ cha-bó͘) are a social group that are a part of a distinct Han community residing in Hui'an County of Quanzhou, Fujian, China. They have a distinct dress and marital customs that have been the focus of both anthropologists and governmental censure.

== History ==
Hui'an madiens as Hokkien, adopted Hokkien culture, and practise Chinese religions but their origin traces back to the ancient Minyue people of more than two thousand years ago. The isolation on the eastern peninsula of Hui'an prevented Hui'an maidens from completely assimilating into the Han culture, so many of their distinctive customs and traditions still survive today. Other Baiyue peoples who continue to retain a cultural distinction from the northern Han despite adopting many of their practises and now speak a Sinitic language include the Tanka people and Pinghua.

== Culture ==
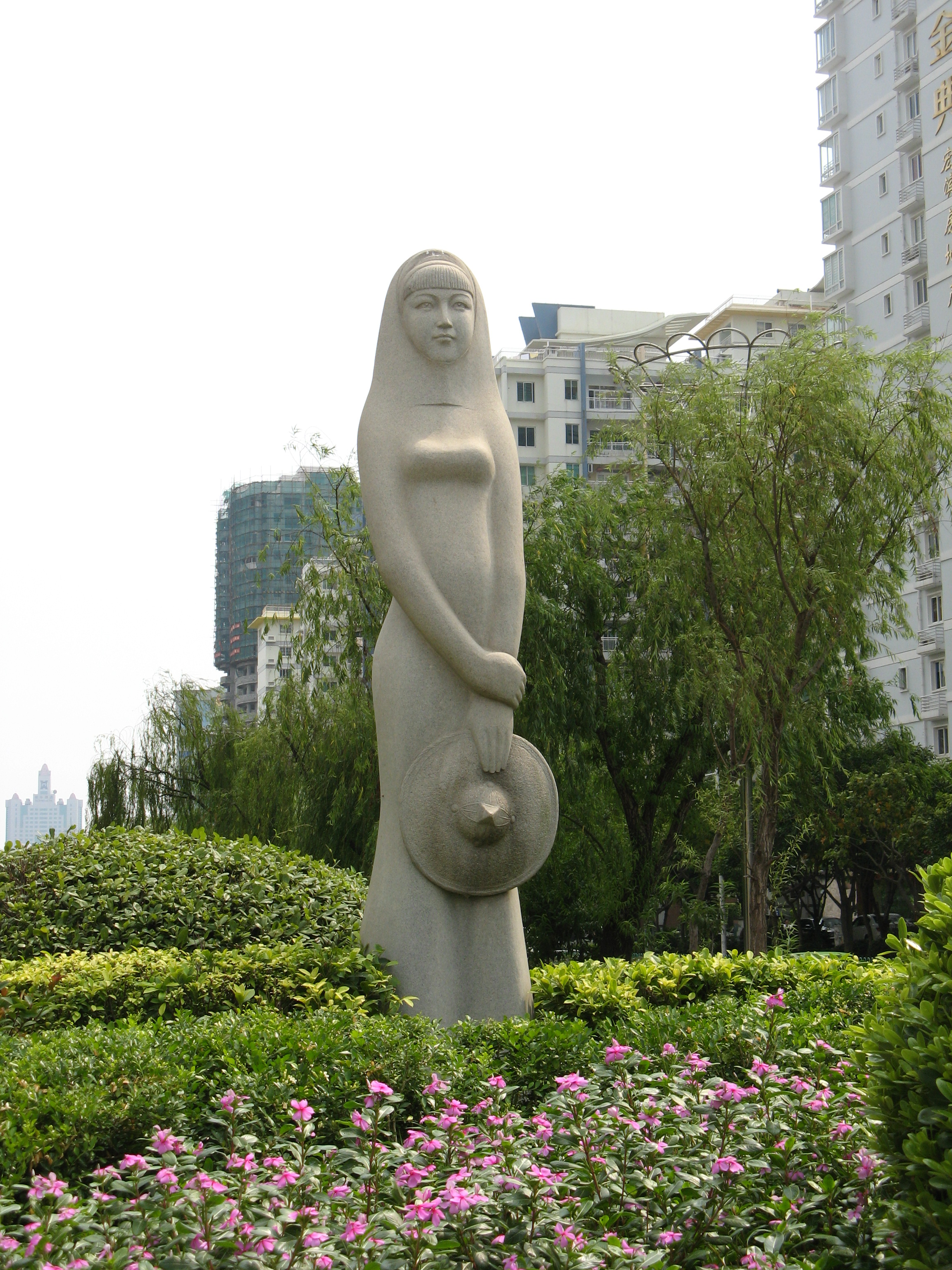
Statue of Hui'an maidens, taken in Quanzhou, Fujian, China.

=== Costumes ===
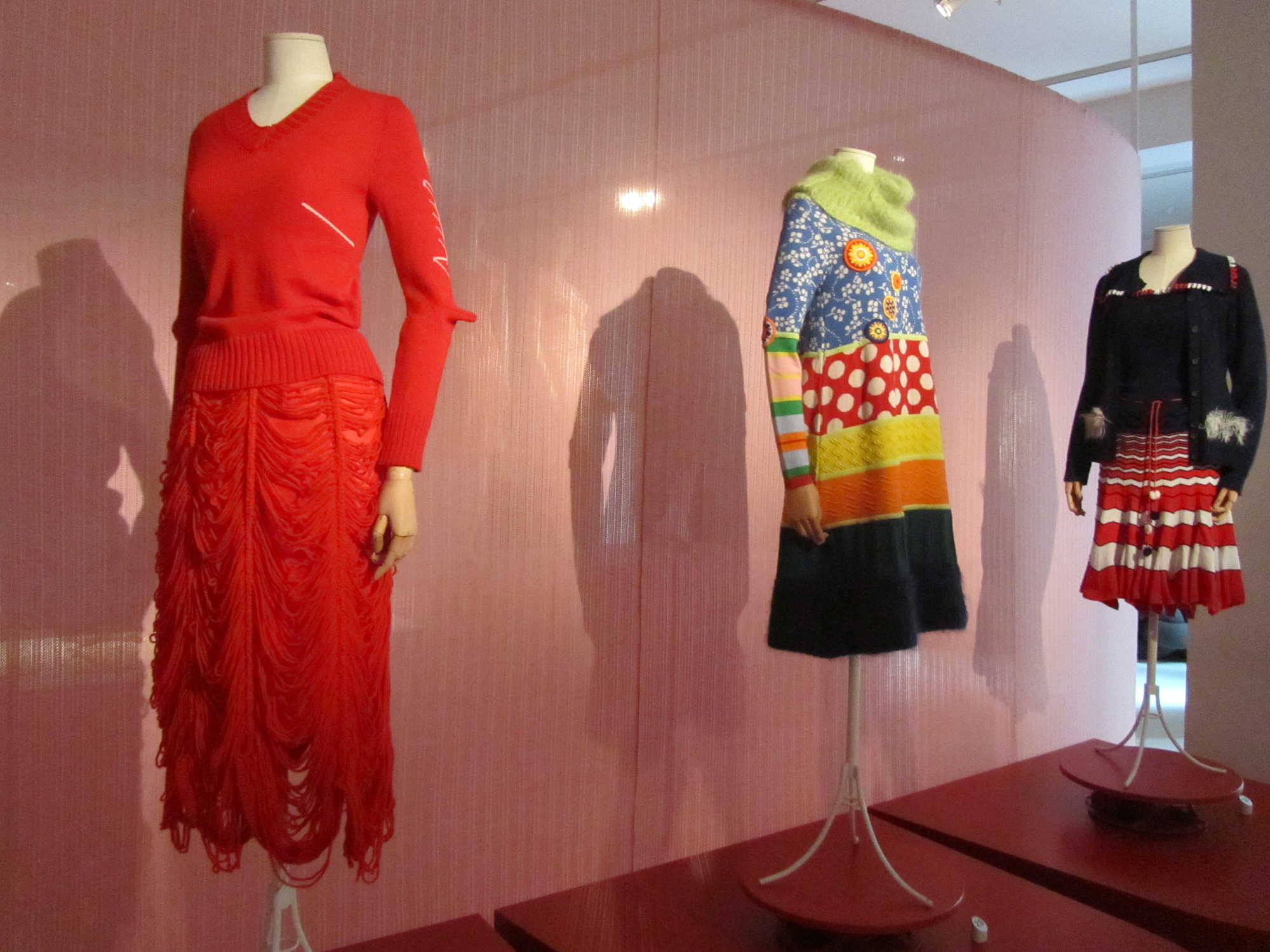
Knitwear exhibition ONTRAFEL at the Modemuseum Antwerpen (MoMu), Belgium. The central design is a dress by Walter van Beirendonck, inspired by the colourful clothing of the Hui'an women.

Traditional dress in Hui'an county for young women was particularly colorful featuring elaborate headgear and exposed midriffs. Typical Hui'an maidens wear short cyan jackets and skintight black hip-huggers that flare out at the legs, and they cover their heads with colorful scarves and conical hats.

The distinct traditional mode of dress gave rise to a frequent misconception that Hui'an county people were not Han Chinese, as well as the joke that the dress of Hui'an is "feudal heads, democratic bellies." Depictions of this mode of dress in popular culture include the film Village of Widows, which deals with sexual mores along the Fujian coast.

=== Marriage ===
Hui'an maidens have very distinct customs regarding their marriage.

Newlyweds are not allowed to stay together on their wedding night, so the groom stays in a friend's house. On the second day, the bride pays respects to the groom's family and gives gifts to the elders. On the third day, the groom's sister leads the bride to the communal well to draw two buckets of water.

After five days of obeying various customs, she returns to her parents' home. The bride and groom are forbidden to live together or even talk to each other until the bride bears a child. Younger generations no longer practice these customs.

=== Religion ===
The majority of the Hui'an people have the same religious practices as other Han Chinese.
