= Hui'an dialect =

Dialect of Hokkien

Hui'an
- 惠安话 / 惠安話
- Native to: China
- Region: Mainly in Hui'an and parts of Quangang District (formerly part of Hui'an), South Fujian province.
- Language family: Sino-Tibetan: Sinitic; Chinese; Min; Coastal Min; Southern Min; Hokkien; Hui'an
- Early forms: Proto-Sino-Tibetan: Old Chinese (Note: Min is believed to have split from Old Chinese, rather than Middle Chinese like other varieties of Chinese.); Proto-Min

Language codes
- ISO 639-3: –
- Glottolog: None
- Linguasphere: 79-AAA-jda

The Hui'an dialect (simplified Chinese: 惠安话; traditional Chinese: 惠安話; Pe̍h-ōe-jī: Hūi-oaⁿ-ōe) is a variety of Chinese mostly spoken in Hui'an in South Fujian Province, China. It belongs to the Hokkien subgroup of Southern Min.

== Phonology ==
The Hui'an dialect has 14 phonemic initials and over 80 finals.

=== Consonants ===
		Bilabial	Alveolar		Velar	Glottal
		Bilabial	plain	sibilant (Note: The alveolar sibilant phonemes /ts/, /tsʰ/ and /s/ are palatalized to [tɕ], [tɕʰ] and [ɕ], respectively, before /i/.)	Velar	Glottal
Plosive/ Affricate	tenuis	/p/ 布	/t/ 大	/ts/ 左	/k/ 歌	/ʔ/ 乌 / 烏
Plosive/ Affricate	aspirated	/pʰ/ 坡	/tʰ/ 兔	/tsʰ/ 菜	/kʰ/ 去	
Plosive/ Affricate	voiced (Note: The three voiced phonemes /b/, /l/ and /ɡ/ are realized as the nasal stops [m], [n] and [ŋ], respectively, before nasalized finals.)	/b/ 马 / 馬	/l/ (Note: The phoneme /l/ may be treated as a plosive, i.e. /d/.) 旅		/ɡ/ 鹅 / 鵝	
Fricative				/s/ 苏 / 蘇		/h/ 鱼 / 魚

=== Finals ===
/i/	/ĩ/			/iʔ/	/ĩʔ/								
/u/				/uʔ/					/un/			/ut/	
/a/	/ã/	/au/		/aʔ/	/ãʔ/	/auʔ/	/ãuʔ/	/am/	/an/	/aŋ/	/ap/	/at/	/ak/
		/ai/	/ãi/				/ãiʔ/						
/e/	/ẽ/			/eʔ/	/ẽʔ/			/em/	/en/	/eŋ/	/ep/	/et/	
/o/				/oʔ/									
/ɔ/	/ɔ̃/				/ɔ̃ʔ/					/ɔŋ/			/ɔk/
/ɯ/				/ɯʔ/									
/ə/				/əʔ/					/ən/			/ət/	
/iu/	/iũ/			/iuʔ/	/iũʔ/								
/ia/	/iã/	/iau/	/iãu/	/iaʔ/	/iãʔ/	/iauʔ/	/iãuʔ/			/iaŋ/			/iak/
/io/				/ioʔ/									
										/iɔŋ/			/iɔk/
/ui/	/uĩ/			/uiʔ/	/uĩʔ/								
/ua/	/uã/	/uai/	/uãi/	/uaʔ/			/uãiʔ/		/uan/	/uaŋ/		/uat/	
/ue/				/ueʔ/									
							/m̩ʔ/	/m̩/					
							/ŋ̍ʔ/			/ŋ̍/			

== Grammar ==
The demonstrative system has five pairs of pronouns with a two-way distinction:

Proximal	Distal	Translation
这 / 這 tsit^{7} (+ number) + numerative	彼 hit^{7} (+ number) + numerative	this/that; these/those; this/that kind of
这 / 這 tsat^{8}	彼 hat^{8}	this/that
这 / 這 tse^{2}	彼 hə^{2}	this/that kind of (generic)
遮 tsuai^{2}	徊 huai^{2}	these/those; this/that
种个 / 種個 tsiɔŋ^{3-2} e^{2}	响个 / 響個 hiɔŋ^{3-2} e^{2}	this/that kind of

== Comparison with other varieties of Hokkien ==
Compared with the Quanzhou dialect (spoken in the central urban area of Quanzhou city), the greatest differences are present in the rimes:

Hui'an	Quanzhou	Example	
Hui'an	Quanzhou	Hui'an	Quanzhou
/em/	/iam/	粘	
/em/	/iam/	/lem˨˦/	/liam˨˦/
/em/	/im/	林	
/em/	/im/	/lem˨˦/	/lim˨˦/
/ep/	/iap/	接	
/ep/	/iap/	/tsep˥/	/tsiap˥/
/ep/	/ip/	执 / 執	
/ep/	/ip/	/tsep˥/	/tsip˥/
/en/	/ian/	烟 / 煙	
/en/	/ian/	/en˧/	/ian˧/
/en/	/in/	因	
/en/	/in/	/en˧/	/in˧/
/et/	/iat/	浙	
/et/	/iat/	/tset˥/	/tsiat˥/
/et/	/it/	质 / 質	
/et/	/it/	/tset˥/	/tsit˥/
/eŋ/	/iŋ/	兵	
/eŋ/	/iŋ/	/peŋ˧/	/piŋ˧/
/ən/	/un/	银 / 銀	
/ən/	/un/	/gən˨˦/	/gun˨˦/
/ət/	/ut/	核	
/ət/	/ut/	/hət˨˧/	/hut˨˦/

== Sources ==
- Chen, Weirong (2008). "Relative Clauses in Hui'an Dialect" (PDF). In Chan, Marjorie K.M.; Kang, Hana (eds.). Proceedings of the 20th North American Conference on Chinese Linguistics (NACCL-20). Columbus, Ohio: The Ohio State University. pp. 567–582.
- Chen, Weirong (2011). The Southern Min Dialect of Hui'an: Morphosyntax and Grammaticalization (PhD). University of Hong Kong. doi:10.5353/th_b4642142.
- Hui'an County Local Chronicles Editorial Board, ed. (1998). 惠安县志 (in Chinese). Vol. 35: 方言. Beijing: China Local Records Publishing. ISBN 7-80122-352-7. Archived from the original on 2019-02-10.
- Zhou, Changji [in Chinese], ed. (2006). 闽南方言大词典 (in Chinese). Fuzhou: Fujian People's Publishing House. ISBN 7-211-03896-9.
