= Hui'an County =

Hui'an County 惠安县 Hweian, Hweianhsien
- County
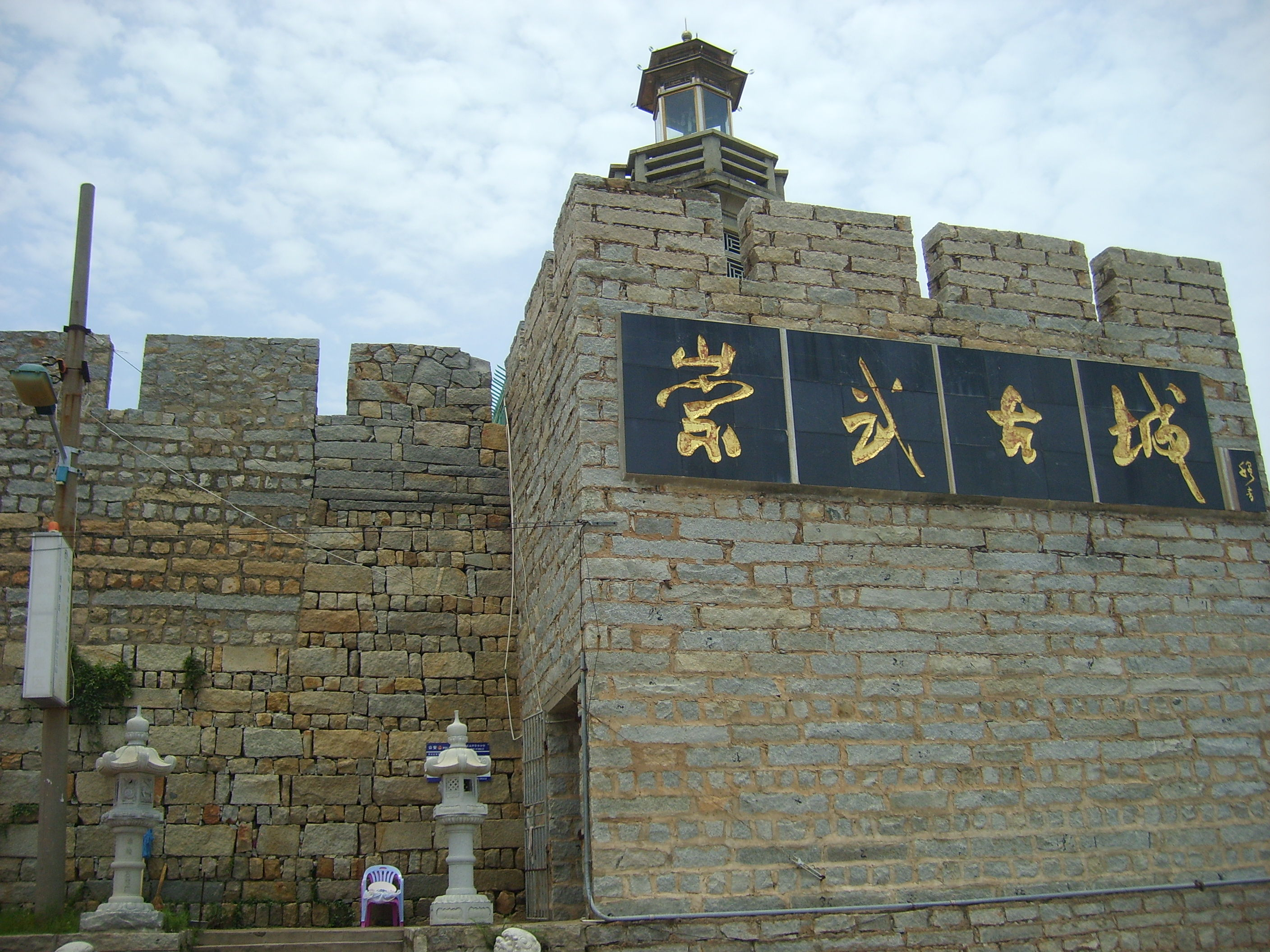
- Walled city of Chongwu

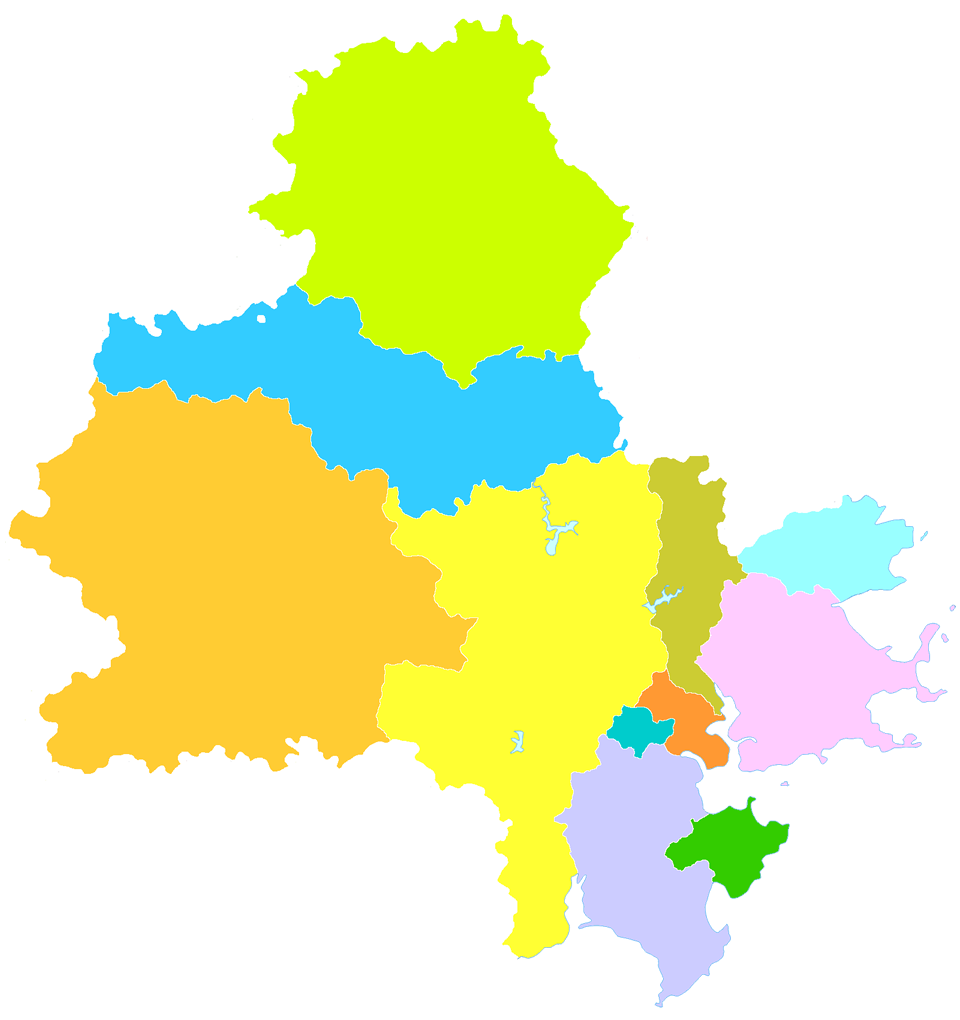
- Hui'an County in Quanzhou

- Location of the seat in Fujian
- Coordinates: 24°59′N 118°48′E
- Country: People's Republic of China
- Province: Fujian
- Prefecture-level city: Quanzhou
- Time zone: UTC+8 (China Standard)

Hui'an (Hui'an Chinese: 惠安; pinyin: Huì'ān; Pe̍h-ōe-jī: Hūi-oaⁿ) is a county under the jurisdiction of the prefecture-level city of Quanzhou, Fujian, People's Republic of China. It is situated in the middle of the Fujian coast, between Quanzhou and Meizhou Bay. The county has a population of 921,794, as of late 2003, with a non-agricultural population of 289,396 people. The dialect is Hui'an dialect, related to Hokkien.

== Administrative divisions ==
The county is divided into fifteen towns and one ethnic township. The only township in the county is Baiqi Hui Ethnic Township.

Towns

- Luocheng (螺城镇), the county seat (the location marked on most maps as "Hui'an")
- Luòyáng (洛阳镇),
- Chongwu (崇武镇),
- Dongyuan (东园镇),
- Zhangban (张坂镇),
- Dongling (东岭镇),
- Wangchuan (辋川镇),
- Tuzhai (涂寨镇),
- Luóyáng (螺阳镇),
- Huangtang (黄塘镇),
- Shanxia (山霞镇),
- Jingfeng (净峰镇),
- Dongqiao (东桥镇),
- Zishan (紫山镇),
- Xiaozuo (小岞镇)

== Economy ==
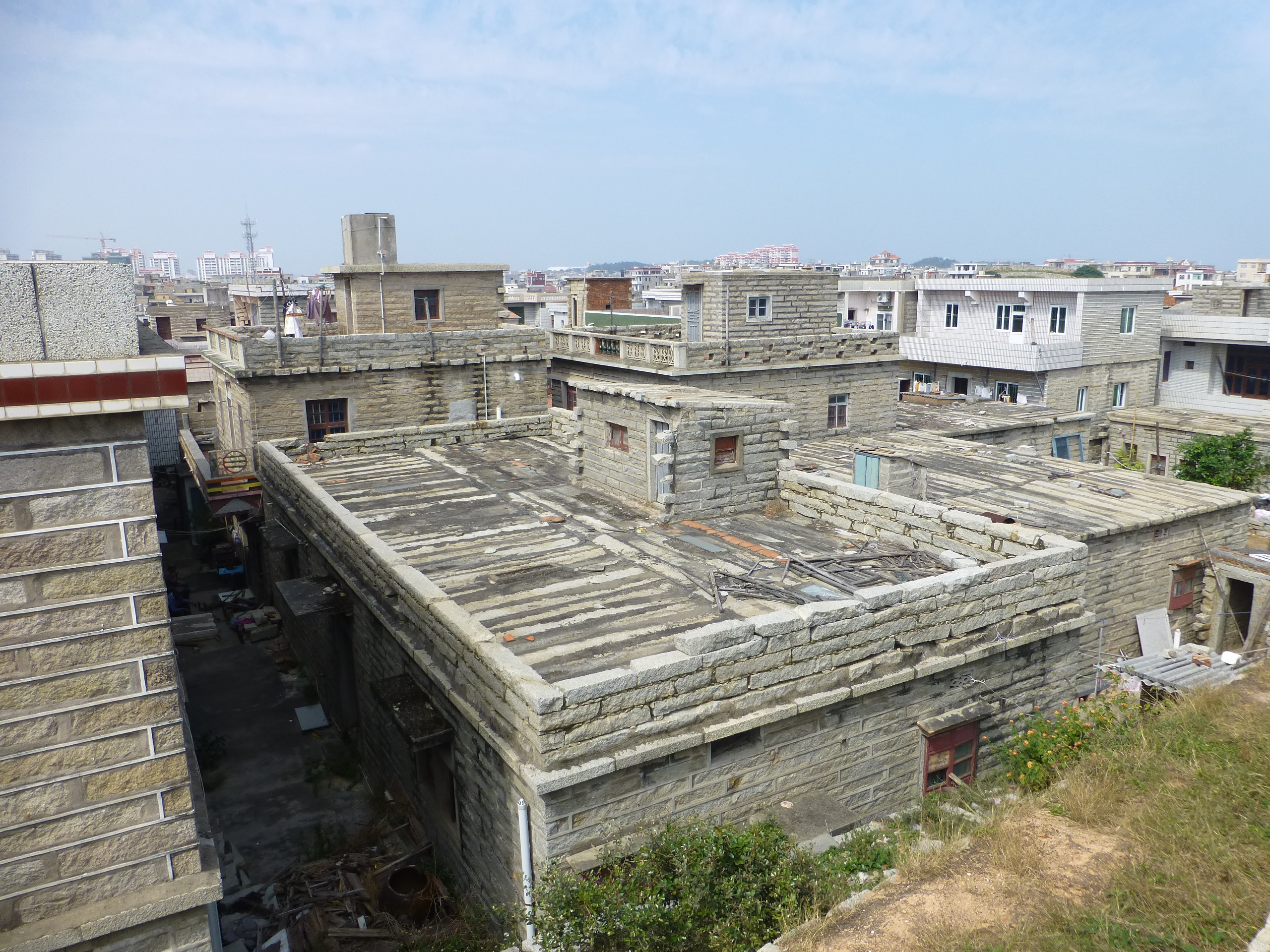
Although apparently new, these houses inside Chongwu's city wall have been built in Hui'an's traditional style, using long narrow granite blocks for both the walls and the roof.

Hui'an people have long been engaged in quarrying local granite and using it for construction purposes. Traditional houses and other structures in the region are constructed from long narrow blocks of granite.

These days, Hui'an's stone workers have built on their experience by becoming manufacturers of stone statuary for China's temples, public places, businesses, and private residences. The 25 km-long (16 mi) road (Huichong Highway) between the Hui'an County seat and the town of Chongwu has a lot of production plants and showrooms of stone-working companies, with statues of all kinds displayed in front of them.

Footwear manufacturing is developed in a number of towns in the western part of the county, closer to Quanzhou.

Dali Foods Group has its headquarters in Hui'an County.

== Transportation ==
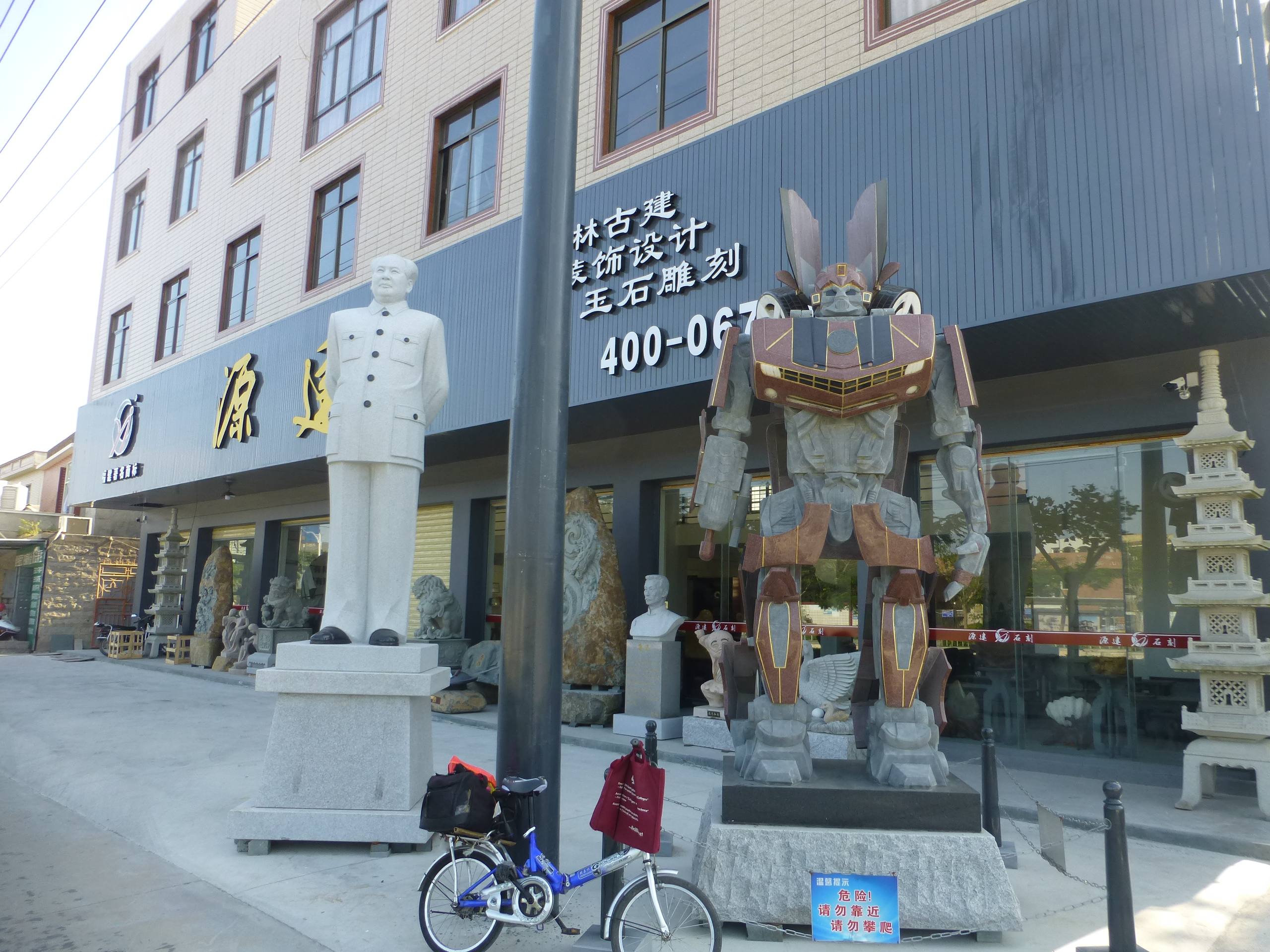
Hui'an stone workers produce a variety of statuary for the national market

The Hui'an Railway Station, on the Fuzhou-Xiamen Railway, is located about 8 km (5.0 mi) northwest of Hui'an's county seat, and is connected to it by a new divided highway (that passes through the 1,680 m-long [1 mi] Dalingtou Tunnel [大嶺頭隧道]), with frequent local bus service. Although a lot fewer trains stop at Hui'an than at major stations such as Quanzhou, there is a train in each direction every hour or two during the day. There is no night service.

The freight-only Zhangping–Quanzhou–Xiaocuo Railway runs south of the county seat.

== Culture ==
Traditional dress in Hui'an county for young women ("Hui'an maidens") was particularly colorful featuring elaborate headgear and exposed midriffs. This gave rise to a frequent misconception that Hui'an county people were not Han Chinese, as well as the joke that the dress of Hui'an is "feudal heads, democratic bellies." Depictions of this mode of dress in popular culture include the film Village of Widows, which deals with sexual mores along the Fujian coast.

== Climate ==
Climate data for Chongwu Town, elevation 22 m (72 ft), (1991–2020 normals, extremes 1981–2010)
Month	Jan	Feb	Mar	Apr	May	Jun	Jul	Aug	Sep	Oct	Nov	Dec	Year
Record high °C (°F)	25.2 (77.4)	26.0 (78.8)	25.6 (78.1)	28.2 (82.8)	30.6 (87.1)	32.5 (90.5)	34.7 (94.5)	36.7 (98.1)	35.2 (95.4)	33.7 (92.7)	29.6 (85.3)	25.4 (77.7)	36.7 (98.1)
Mean daily maximum °C (°F)	15.2 (59.4)	15.3 (59.5)	17.4 (63.3)	21.2 (70.2)	25.2 (77.4)	27.9 (82.2)	30.0 (86.0)	30.4 (86.7)	29.6 (85.3)	26.1 (79.0)	22.2 (72.0)	17.6 (63.7)	23.2 (73.7)
Daily mean °C (°F)	12.5 (54.5)	12.4 (54.3)	14.5 (58.1)	18.4 (65.1)	22.7 (72.9)	25.9 (78.6)	27.7 (81.9)	27.9 (82.2)	27.0 (80.6)	23.4 (74.1)	19.5 (67.1)	14.9 (58.8)	20.6 (69.0)
Mean daily minimum °C (°F)	10.6 (51.1)	10.5 (50.9)	12.4 (54.3)	16.3 (61.3)	20.8 (69.4)	24.3 (75.7)	25.9 (78.6)	26.0 (78.8)	24.9 (76.8)	21.4 (70.5)	17.6 (63.7)	13.0 (55.4)	18.6 (65.5)
Record low °C (°F)	3.3 (37.9)	2.9 (37.2)	2.0 (35.6)	7.0 (44.6)	11.4 (52.5)	16.0 (60.8)	21.6 (70.9)	21.8 (71.2)	16.7 (62.1)	12.9 (55.2)	7.7 (45.9)	2.0 (35.6)	2.0 (35.6)
Average precipitation mm (inches)	38.5 (1.52)	65.5 (2.58)	93.3 (3.67)	99.0 (3.90)	156.6 (6.17)	182.4 (7.18)	104.7 (4.12)	135.0 (5.31)	96.1 (3.78)	44.0 (1.73)	36.1 (1.42)	37.2 (1.46)	1,088.4 (42.84)
Average precipitation days (≥ 0.1 mm)	6.6	9.0	12.9	12.5	13.5	12.5	6.5	8.5	7.1	3.1	4.5	5.9	102.6
Average relative humidity (%)	74	77	79	82	84	89	86	84	77	71	73	72	79
Mean monthly sunshine hours	131.4	106.5	120.0	130.9	144.1	176.8	268.7	248.0	216.1	204.5	157.7	141.6	2,046.3
Percentage possible sunshine	39	33	32	34	35	43	64	62	59	57	48	43	46
Source: China Meteorological Administration
