= G.B. Hajim =

Hawaiian producer and writer

Geoffrey Blair Hajim (born February 25, 1966) is a producer, director, writer, and visual artist who currently resides in Hilo, Hawaii. He has been involved in more than 250 projects ranging from television commercials to the first feature film to be produced in the Hawaiian language.

== Career ==
In 1997, Hajim produced a documentary about Hawaii Volcanoes National Park for the Discovery Channel, and collaborated with Pūnana Leo to create over 120 videos in the Hawaiian language. He is also credited with producing the first feature length film in Hawaiian, and during this time period, he became fluent in the language.

In 2013, Hajim directed and produced an animated, science fiction musical film, titled Strange Frame: Love & Sax in collaboration with filmmaker Shelley Doty. To achieve the desired level of sound quality, he enlisted the help of sound engineers from Skywalker Sound, including Gary Rizzo and voice casting agent Jamie Thomason. This led to the casting of Claudia Christian, Tim Curry, Michael Dorn, Ron Glass, George Takei, and Alan Tudyk to voice the characters in the film.

=== Hawaii Con ===
With the support of a successful Kickstarter campaign that exceeded its initial goal of $35,000, 2014, Hajim founded HawaiiCon in September of 2014.It was a conference that was designed to promote a sense of 'ohana and respect for the land. HawaiiCon was a three-day science, sci-fi and fantasy convention that took place on Hawaii's Big Island. The event featured guests, including cast members from Stargate Atlantis, Star Trek, and Game of Thrones. Attendees could experience astronomy and mock Mars missions, learn about ancient Hawaiian mythology, and participate in workshops and tours. The conference also included panels and discussions led by experts in the field of astronomy, aerospace, and Hawaiian culture.

In 2018 Hajim taught 'Images in Motion Art' at Hawaiʻi Community College.

== Filmography ==
Directed features
Year	Title	Production company
1994	First Days on Earth	Screaming Wink Productions
1996	Destination: WOW Hall	Screaming Wink Productions
1997	Pacific Passages	Screaming Wink Productions
2012	Strange Frame: Love & Sax	Island Planet One Productions
2023	Mermaids' Lament	Tween Sea and Sand

Produced features
Year	Title	Production company
1993	The Lost Continent	Little Odette's
1994	First Days on Earth	Screaming Wink Productions
1996	Destination: WOW Hall	Screaming Wink Productions
1997	Pacific Passages	Screaming Wink Productions
1997	Volcano: Fountains of Fire	
2000	Ka'ililauokekoa	Screaming Wink Productions
2012	Strange Frame: Love & Sax	Island Planet One Productions
2019	Stoke	Larkin Pictures, A Walled GardenCrook, Nanny Productions
2022	Racket	Larkin Pictures, Little Big Top
2023	Chaperone	1919 Films

== Awards and nominations ==
- In 2012, Hajim's Film Strange Frame won Best Feature Film at DragonCon.
- In 2013, Hajim's Film Strange Frame won Best Animated Feature at the Big Island Film Festival.
- The Weirdcademy Awards bestowed Hajim's Strange Frame with both the award of Weirdest Movie of 2013 and Weirdest Actress Award to Claudia Black for her voiceover performance as saxophonist Parker.
