= Edith Kanakaʻole =

Hawaiian teacher and kumu hula (1913–1979)

- Born: Edith Kekuhikuhipuʻuoneonāaliʻiōkohala Kenao; October 30, 1913; Honomū, Moku o Hilo (district) Territory of Hawaiʻi
- Died: October 3, 1979 (aged 65)
- Occupations: Chanter, teacher, kumu hula
- Spouse: Luka Kanakaʻole
- Children: 6, including: Nalani Kanakaʻole; Pualani Kanakaʻole Kanahele

Edith Kenao Kanakaʻole (born Edith Kekuhikuhipuʻuoneonāaliʻiōkohala Kenao, October 30, 1913 – October 3, 1979) was a Hawaiian dancer, chanter, teacher, and kumu hula. Born in Honomū, Hawaiʻi in 1913, she was taught hula from a young age, and dropped out of her formal schooling before completing middle school. She began to compose traditional Hawaiian music in 1946, choreographing hula to accompany many of her chants, and founded Hālau O Kekuhi in 1953. In the 1970s, she taught Hawaiian studies and language at Hawaiʻi Community College and later the University of Hawaiʻi at Hilo, where she worked until her death in 1979.

== Early life ==
Edith Kenao Kanakaʻole was born Edith Kekuhikuhipuʻuoneonāaliʻiōkohala Kenao on October 30, 1913, in Honomū, on the Hāmākua coast of Hawaiʻi. She was one of 12 children of Mary Keliikuewa Ahiena and John Kanaeleolualakaʻikenao. Kanakaʻole did not finish middle school, later joking that her formal education ended at "seventh grade and a half". In an interview with PBS released posthumously, she recalled subsistence fishing with her family as a child.

Kanakaʻole's father played various instruments including the harp, violin, and guitar. Her mother was a hula teacher and began instructing her from a young age; she later studied under Akoni Mika.

Kanakaʻole was among the first Hawaiian homesteaders to move to Keaukaha, which was established in 1924. On January 21, 1933, she married Luka Kanakaʻole; the couple would have six children including Nalani Kanakaʻole and Pualani Kanakaʻole Kanahele.

== Career ==
Kanakaʻole was a Hawaiian dancer, chanter, teacher, and kumu hula. She began composing oli (Hawaiian chants) in 1946, and songs in 1947. She choreographed hula to go with many of her chants. In 1953, after her mother had a stroke, she trained her daughters Nalani and Pualani to eventually take over the hālau.

In the early 1950s, Kanakaʻole toured the contiguous United States, western Canada, and much of Asia with a hula group named after her daughter Nalani. Her mother died of a stroke shortly afterward. She founded a hālau in honor of her mother, naming it Hālau O Kekuhi; kekuhi being Hawaiian for flying gurnard, a species of fish.

Kanakaʻole originated a distinct style of hula derived from the traditions of the Hilo area, in which dancers perform with deeply bent knees and make dynamic movements. She taught this style to her children and her other students at Hālau O Kekuhi.

Having established herself in the field of hula before the Hawaiian Renaissance of the 1960s and 1970s, Kanakaʻole became a prominent figure in the resurgence of Hawaiian cultural identity. Deeply affected by Native Hawaiian struggles following Hawaiʻi's statehood, including assimilatory policies and disputes over land sacred to Hawaiians, she sought to share her cultural knowledge as an educator. Kanakaʻole helped develop the first Hawaiian language program for public school students at the Keaukaha School in Hilo. She worked with Kwai Wah Lee, founder of a program in which Hawaiian elders mentored public school students, to identify suitable mentors. She additionally composed the chant fully E Hō Mai Ka ʻIke, known as E Hō Mai, or 'Grant Me The Understanding' in English.

Kanakaʻole worked as a teacher at Hawaiʻi Community College from 1971 to 1979, and at the University of Hawaiʻi at Hilo from 1973 to 1979, where she became the lead Hawaiian language teacher at the Ka Haka ʻUla O Keʻelikōlani College of Hawaiian Language and supported student efforts to establish a Bachelor of Arts degree in Hawaiian Studies. At both schools, she created courses and seminars on subjects including ethnobotany, Polynesian history, genealogy, and Hawaiian chant and mythology.

After being diagnosed with cancer, Kanakaʻole died on October 3, 1979; she was 65 years old.

== Recognition ==
Kanakaʻole represented Hawaiʻi at the Second South Pacific Festival of the Arts in Rotorua, New Zealand in 1976, and the State Association of Hawaiian Civic Clubs named her "Hawaiian of the Year" in 1977. Two years later, she received the Award of Distinction for Cultural Leadership from the Governor of Hawaiʻi, the Order of Ke Aliʻi Pauahi from Kamehameha Schools, and was named a Living Treasure of Hawaiʻi. In 1978 and 1979, she won Na Hoku Hanohano Awards for best traditional album; her acceptance speech for the first award was entirely in the Hawaiian language, while the second award was given posthumously.

After Kanakaʻole's death in 1979, the Honolulu Star-Bulletin described her as "[one] of the Big Island's most cherished educators". In 1990, the Edith Kanakaʻole Foundation was established to perpetuate teachings by Kanakaʻole and her husband. The Edith Kanakaʻole Multi-Purpose Stadium in Hilo, used annually for the Merrie Monarch Festival, is named in her honor, as is a building at the University of Hawaiʻi at Hilo.

Kanakaʻole is the first Native Hawaiian woman to be featured on a U.S. quarter, when she became one of five women to be depicted on an American Women quarter in 2023. In a press release announcing the honor, the United States Mint stated that Kanakaʻole's "moʻolelo, or stories, served to rescue aspects of Hawaiian history, customs and traditions that were disappearing due to the cultural bigotry of the time".

== Discography ==
- Haakui Pele I Hawaii ("Pele Prevails in Hawaii") – 1978 Na Hoku Hanohano Award for best traditional album
- Hiipoi I Ka Aiina Aloha ("Cherish the Beloved Land") – 1979 Na Hoku Hanohano Award for best traditional album

== Works cited ==
- Aikau, Hokulani K.; Gonzalez, Vernadette Vicuña, eds. (2019). Detours: A Decolonial Guide to Hawaiʻi. Durham. ISBN 978-1-4780-0583-4. OCLC 1107062118.
- Commire, Anne; Klezmer, Deborah, eds. (2007). "Kanakaole, Edith K.". Dictionary of Women Worldwide: 25,000 Women Through the Ages. Detroit, Michigan: Yorkin Publications. p. 999. ISBN 978-0-7876-9394-7. OCLC 71817179.
- Dawson, Shay (2023). "Edith Kanaka'ole". National Women's History Museum.
- Hopkins, Jerry (1984). "Kanakaole, Edith Kenao". In Peterson, Barbara Bennett (ed.). Notable Women of Hawaii. Honolulu: University of Hawaiʻi Press. pp. 198–200. ISBN 0-8248-0820-7. OCLC 11030010.
- Kamanā, Kauanoe; Wilson, William H. (2019). "ʻAha Pūnana Leo – Advancing From the Grassroots". Linguapax Review 7. Catalonia: Linguapax. pp. 51–52.
