= Body and Soul (Star Trek: Voyager) =

- Star Trek: Voyager episode
- Episode no.: Season 7 Episode 7
- Directed by: Robert Duncan McNeill
- Teleplay by: Eric Morris; Phyllis Strong; Mike Sussman; Michael Taylor (story); Michael Ferdie (concept)
- Production code: 255
- Original air date: November 15, 2000

Guest appearances
- Fritz Sperberg - Captain Ranek; Megan Gallagher - Lt. Jaryn; David Starwalt - Captain #2; Marva Hicks - Holographic T'Pel

Episode chronology
← Previous "Inside Man"	Next → "Nightingale"
- Star Trek: Voyager season 7

"Body and Soul" is the 153rd episode of Star Trek: Voyager, the seventh episode of the seventh season. This television episode is one installment of a science fiction series involving a spacecraft trying to get back to Earth from the other side of the Galaxy. The show aired on the United Paramount Network on November 15, 2000. It is focused especially on two characters, Seven of Nine (a former Borg drone) and the holographic medical program called the Doctor (played by Jeri Ryan and Robert Picardo respectively). The episode was noted for its humor and acting performances in reception.

== Plot ==
Aboard the Delta Flyer, Seven of Nine, the Doctor, and Ensign Harry Kim, encounter the Lokirrin species. The Lokirrin experienced an insurgency by their holograms, and therefore harbor prejudice against all photonic beings. The Lokirrin detect the Doctor and board the Delta Flyer; they capture Seven and Kim, but the Doctor is nowhere to be found. Seven reveals to Kim that she is the Doctor—Seven downloaded his program into her Borg implants, and he controls Seven's body. As Seven, the Doctor interacts with several Lokirrin crew, and their captain Ranek is attracted to her.

Aboard Voyager, Tuvok has started going through Pon Farr (the seven-year urge to mate). When the planned treatment does not work Tom Paris (standing in as medic in the Doctor's absence) creates a hologram of Tuvok's wife on the holodeck.

The Doctor temporarily grants Seven possession of her own body. Seven protests his indulgence in food and sexual arousal while controlling her body, but the Doctor argues such sensations and emotions make life worth living and she shouldn't deny herself them. Meanwhile, Voyager encounters a different group of Lokirrin and Captain Janeway agrees to shut down holodeck activities while in Lokirrin space; unfortunately this interrupts Tuvok's holodeck treatment.

The Doctor (in Seven's body) sedates Ranek during a date and contacts Voyager. In the ensuing conflict with Voyager Ranek is injured. The Doctor reveals he is a hologram and treats Ranek, showing the Lokirrin that not all photonic beings are villainous.

Back aboard Voyager, Seven brings a meal to sickbay and describes the sensations she feels eating it allowing the Doctor to enjoy it vicariously. Tuvok completes his holodeck treatment and thanks Tom for his help while also making it clear the hologram could not replace his real wife.

== Production ==
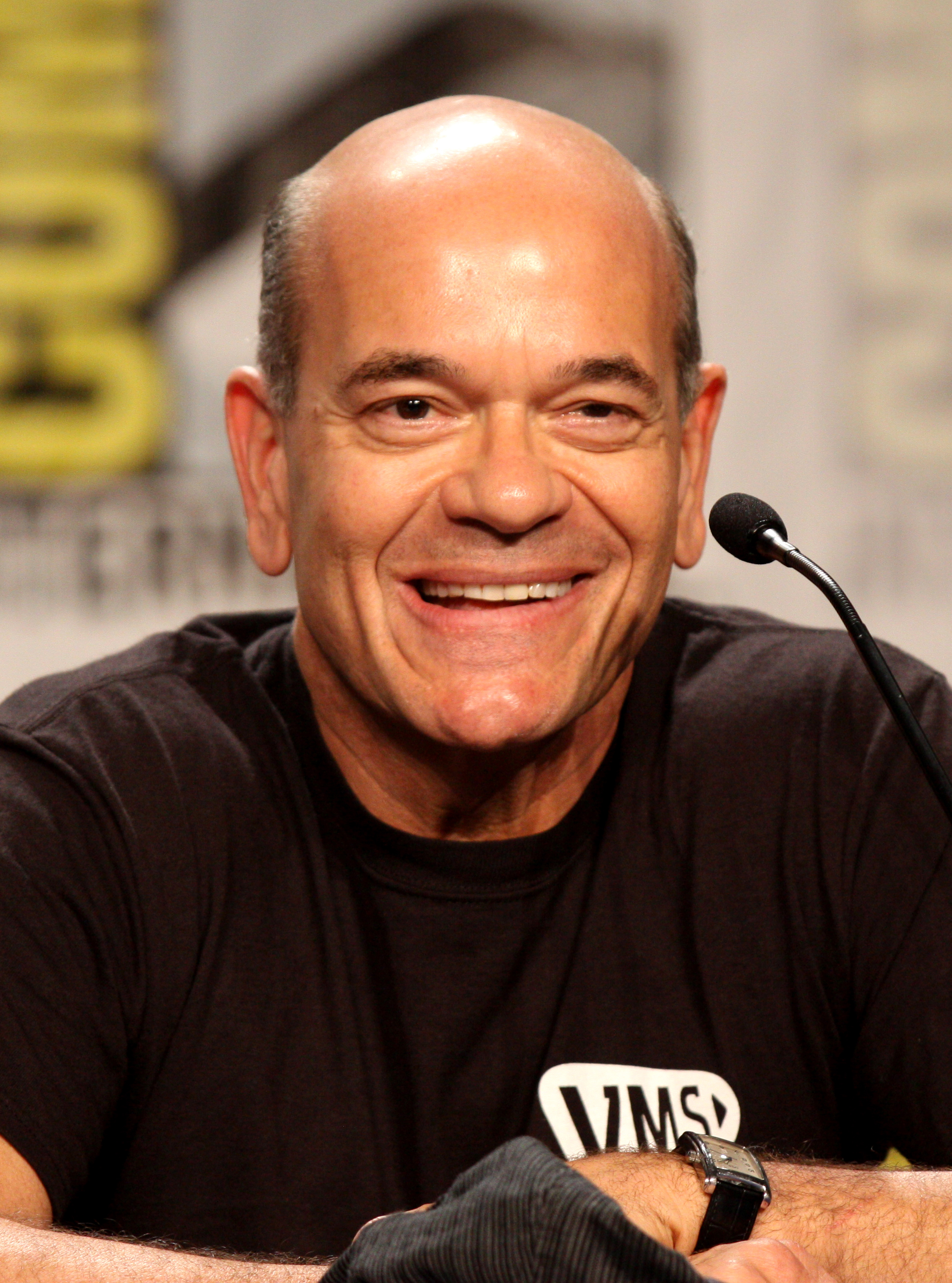
Robert Picardo is the Voyager EMH "The Doctor", in this episode noted for its humor and acting performances

"Body and Soul" was one of four episodes of Star Trek: Voyager to be directed by cast member Robert Duncan McNeill, who portrays Tom Paris in the series. He liked the story itself, and praised the guest stars Megan Gallagher and Fritz Sperberg. He said that "I just had such fun on that. It was a real treat." Specifically of Jeri Ryan's performance, he said that she did a "great job" in duplicating the mannerisms of Robert Picardo; "Jeri nailed Bob's gestures, his eye rolls, everything." He also felt that the comedy in the episode translated to viewers who were not necessarily fans of the show but that Ryan's performance added an extra layer for fans.

Gallagher had previously appeared twice in Star Trek: Deep Space Nine prior to her Voyager appearance, first in the episode "Invasive Procedures" and then in the fan favourite "Little Green Men". She was visiting her husband Jeff Yagher on the set of the Voyager episode "Flesh and Blood", and was asked by Merri Howard if she was free to appear in the series as Howard and McNeill were preparing for "Body and Soul" at the time. She was not required to audition, and instead was cast as Lt. Jaryn for the episode.

== Reception ==
In 2012, Den of Geek listed this as an honorable mention for their ranking of the top ten episodes of Star Trek: Voyager.

In 2017, this was ranked as one of the funniest Star Trek episodes of the franchise. They also praised actress Jeri Ryan's acting performance as the uploaded EMH personality with such lines as enjoying cheesecake.

In 2019, Comic Book Resources noted this episode as one of the top 20 funniest episodes of the Star Trek franchise, which at the time included more than 700 installments. They stated "Ryan and Picardo are obviously having pure fun with this...", especially remarking how Jeri Ryan impersonated the other character, which due to the story's plot elements had been uploaded to her cybernetic storage.

In 2022, SyFy Wire included this as one of the 12 (Note: The SyFy Wire article treats the two-part / two-season episodes of "Scorpion" as one episode, doing the same for the similarly structured "Unimatrix Zero", when counting the number of episodes included in its list of 12.) "essential" Seven of Nine episodes in the franchise.

== Home media releases ==
On December 21, 2003, this episode was released on DVD as part of a Season 7 boxset; Star Trek Voyager: Complete Seventh Season.
