= Pualani Kanakaʻole Kanahele =

Kumu hula and author

Pualani Kanakaʻole Kanahele (born September 14, 1937) is a Hawaiian kumu hula and author. She is the daughter of Edith Kanakaʻole, and as of 2003 led Hālau o Kekuhi along with her sister Nalani Kanakaʻole. In 1993, the sisters were jointly named National Heritage Fellows by the National Endowment for the Arts, which recognized them as "Hula Masters".

== Career ==
In 1994, Kanahele was invited by the Dalai Lama to give a speech about world peace at an academic symposium for 600 people at the Hawai‘i Prince Hotel in Honolulu. In 1995, Kanahele co-wrote and directed the first opera-length hula drama for the stage, titled Holo Mai Pele. In 1999, she represented Hawai‘i in a UNESCO committee on native cultures and intellectual property.

As of 2003, Kanahele led Hālau o Kekuhi along with her sister Nalani Kanakaʻole, additionally teaching Hawaiian studies at Hawaiʻi Community College during the day.

Kanahele was among the leaders of the Thirty Meter Telescope protests in 2019. In May 2021, she was one of seven Native Hawaiians named to a working group of 15 people that was convened by the Hawaii House of Representatives to develop recommendations for management of the Mauna Kea summit.

As of 2020, Kanahele was president of the Edith Kanakaʻole Foundation.

== Personal life ==
Kanahele has two daughters, Kekuhi Kanahele-Frias and Huihui Kanahele-Mossman.
