= Kauanoe Kamanā =

Hawaiian language educator

- Born: 1954; Honolulu, Hawaiʻi, United States
- Education: University of Hawaiʻi at Hilo
- Occupation: Hawaiian language educator

Kauanoe Kamanā is a Hawaiian language educator. Since the Hawaiian Renaissance of the 1970s, she has worked towards reestablishing the Hawaiian language in everyday life. Kamanā is cofounder and president of ʻAha Pūnana Leo, an organization of private schools for Hawaiian language immersion instruction. She is also an associate professor at the College of Hawaiian Language at the University of Hawaiʻi at Hilo.

== Early life and education ==
Kauanoe Kamanā was born in 1954 in Honolulu and raised in Kalihi, on Oʻahu, and Kalamaʻula, on Molokaʻi. When she was growing up, very few people of her generation spoke Hawaiian, and she did not learn conversational Hawaiian in her home.

She attended Kamehameha Schools in Kapālama, studying French and graduating in 1969.

Kamanā studied Hawaiian language under Larry Kimura at the University of Hawaiʻi. In 2010 she earned a Ph.D. in Hawaiian and Indigenous Language and Culture Revitalization from the University of Hawaiʻi at Hilo. She was the first person of Native Hawaiian ancestry to receive a Ph.D. in that topic from the College of Hawaiian Language. Her Ph.D. dissertation was titled "Mo‘oki‘ina Ho‘oponopono: Ke Ō O Ka ‘Ike Ku‘una Hawai‘i Ma Ke Kula ‘O Nāwahīokalani‘ōpu’u," focusing on traditional Hawaiian conflict resolution as practiced at the Nāwahīokalaniʻōpuʻu school.

== Career ==
Kamanā and her husband, William H. "Pila" Wilson, were part of the group of Hawaiian language educators to found ʻAha Pūnana Leo in 1983 with the goal of reestablishing Hawaiian language and culture in Hawaiʻi. The nonprofit consists of a network of private schools based on a "language nest" model. Their two children were raised with Hawaiian as the sole language of the home and schooling, attending schooling conducted in Hawaiian through high school graduation.

At the University of Hawaiʻi at Hilo, Kamanā is an associate professor in the College of Hawaiian Language and program coordinator for Kula Mauli Ola, the Hawaiian Medium Laboratory Schools. Kamanā serves as the president for Ke Kula ʻO Nāwahīokalani’ōpu’u, a Hawaiian immersion laboratory school for prekindergarten to grade 12 students in Kea‘au.

== Recognition ==
In 2020 a panel of experts selected ten influential women from Hawaiʻi as part of the USA Today Women of the Century project; Kamanā was represented on the list for her advocacy work.
