= Ulukau =

Online, digital library of Native Hawaiian reference material

- Website type: Digital library
- Website: ulukau.org
- Launched: 2003
- Current status: Active

Ulukau is an online, digital library focused on Native Hawaiian history, culture, and language.The site hosts a large collection of Hawaiian-language newspapers, books, and other materials that are searchable in both English and Hawaiian. First launched in 2003, the website receives upwards of one million visitors each month and is primarily supported by the University of Hawaiʻi at Hilo.

== History ==
Ulukau was first conceptualized by Keiki Kawaiʻaeʻa and Keola Donaghy, both assistant professors at the University of Hawaiʻi at Hilo, as the first online library focused exclusively on Hawaiian language, history, and culture. From 2001 onwards, institutions including the University of Hawaiʻi at Hilo, the Bishop Museum, and Kamehama Schools worked to digitize their records and make them accessible online.

Ulukau was soft-launched in September 2003 and formally opened to the public on March 22, 2004 at the Native Hawaiian Education Association Convention. Within a month of the website launching, it logged 150,000 visitors. At launch, the website included a collection of Hawaiian newspapers, multiple dictionaries of the Hawaiian language, and a Hawaiian Bible. Ulukau was noted at launch for being fully searchable in both English and Hawaiian and for having a full Hawaiian-language interface available to users.

In 2006, Ulukau began aiding the Polynesian Voyaging Society in digitizing their records, with the records being publicly released in 2012. Also in 2012, the site hit a record high 1.4 million visits a month. In 2016, an archive of the radio show Larry Kimura's radio show Ka Leo Hawaiʻi was added to the website.

In 2022 the website was redesigned to prioritize the user experience.

== Collection ==
The website exclusively hosts materials related to Hawaiian language, history, and culture. Among its collection are tens of thousands of digitized Hawaiian-language newspapers from 1834 to 1949, which are searchable in both English and Hawaiian. It also hosts Mary Kawena Pukui's body of work on the Hawaiian language and a collection of curriculum materials for Hawaiian educators.

Institutions hosting records on Ulukau include:

- The Bishop Museum
- Kamehama Schools
- Polynesian Voyaging Society
- University of Hawaiʻi at Hilo

== Partnerships ==
Ulukau was founded by the University of Hawaiʻi at Hilo's Hale Kuamo'o Center with support from the Administration for Native Americans. The library runs on the collection management software systems Greenstone and Veridian.
