= Yagher =

Yagher is a surname. Notable people with the surname include:

- Jeff Yagher (born 1961), American actor
- Kevin Yagher (born 1962), American special effects technician, brother of Jeff
