= Night Life (1989 film) =

- Directed by: David Acomba
- Written by: Keith F. Critchlow
- Produced by: Charles Lippincott
- Starring: Scott Grimes; John Astin; Cheryl Pollak; Anthony Geary; Alan Blumenfield; Kenneth Ian Davis; Darcy DeMoss; Lisa Fuller; Mark Pellegrino; Phil Proctor
- Cinematography: Roger Tonry
- Edited by: Michael John Bateman
- Music by: Roger Bourland
- Production company: Creative Movie Marketing
- Release date: June 17, 1989; (UK)
- Running time: 89 minutes
- Country: United States
- Language: English

Night Life is a 1989 American zombie comedy film directed by David Acomba and starring Scott Grimes, John Astin, and Cheryl Pollak. It centers around a high school nerd named Archie Melville who is harassed from beyond the grave by the zombie corpses of his former high school bullies (recently deceased) after they are brought back to life by a freak lightning storm. It is also known as Grave Misdemeanors.

== Plot ==
As teenager Archie Melville is disposing of remains from his Uncle Verlin's mortuary business, where he works under the agreement that Verlin will pay for his college tuition, he runs across high school jocks John, Rog, and their girlfriends Roberta and Joanie who have trespassed onto the property in their car to make out. This escalates into a conflict between Archie and the jocks which Roberta, the only one in the group sympathetic to Archie, shuts down by calling John out on his bullying.

The harassment only escalates when Rog believes Archie is staring at Joanie leading to a series of conflicts including vehicular assault from John and Rog, a prank by Archie on John, a showdown at a gas station where Archie's only friend Charly works, and a joint prank where John and Rog rig up a body at the mortuary to fall on Archie while Joanie seduces him. This last stunt results in Archie getting fired from his job, blowing his chances at college. Finally, Archie learns that Charly has accepted a job on a pit crew with her boyfriend and will be leaving town.

While Archie is wallowing in his depression he receives a phone call from Verlin offering him one last chance at his job if he can help him transport and ready four corpses at once; the bodies of John, Rog, Roberta, and Joanie who were just killed in a car accident.

That night, an intense storm causes the mortuary to be struck by lightning which revives the four dead teens as zombies who go on a violent rampage, killing a repairman at the mortuary and terrorizing Archie. Archie flees to Charly's garage where he finds her heartbroken as things with her boyfriend did not work out. Soon after, the boyfriend and eventually Uncle Verlin who attempted to punish the teens for breaking into the mortuary despite Archie's warnings are killed along with a couple of police officers who stop the zombies for speeding.

Archie and Charly flee the garage to another building where they attempt to trap the zombies in a furnace with Roberta, who has been trying to kiss Archie since reanimating, being killed by Charly with an axe to the head. The fire only slows the others down and further disfigures them leading to another gory conflict on a train bridge where John is killed by a train. Caught between the zombies in a stolen police car and an oncoming train, Archie and Charly jump for their lives into the water below where Archie is captured and drug into a graveyard by Rog and Joanie. Charly, despite not being able to swim, rescues Archie from the two zombies and they are finally killed in the process.

Later that morning, as the teens reflect on what has happened, Archie asks Charly how she was able to avoid drowning. Charly jokes that she did drown and is a zombie herself, causing a terrified Archie to have to check her body heat to make sure she's really alive.

== Cast ==
- Scott Grimes as Archie Melville
- John Astin as Uncle Verlin
- Cheryl Pollak as Charly
- Anthony Geary as John Devlin
- Alan Blumenfield as Frank
- Kenneth Ian Davis as Rog Davis
- Darcy DeMoss as Roberta Woods
- Lisa Fuller as Joanie Snowland
- Mark Pellegrino as Allen Patumbo
- Phil Proctor as Randolph Whitlock
- Erik Cord Police Officer

== Reception ==
Writing in The Zombie Movie Encyclopedia, academic Peter Dendle called the film "a routine and laborious living-dead exercise". Glenn Kay, who wrote Zombie Movies: The Ultimate Guide, called it a "rather minor teen effort".

== Confusion with Nightlife (1989) ==
Night Life is usually confused with another film similarly named and also released in the same year, Nightlife, which is a vampire-themed comedy horror TV movie made for the USA Network.
