= Nālani Kanakaʻole =

Hawaiin Kumu hula (1946–2026)

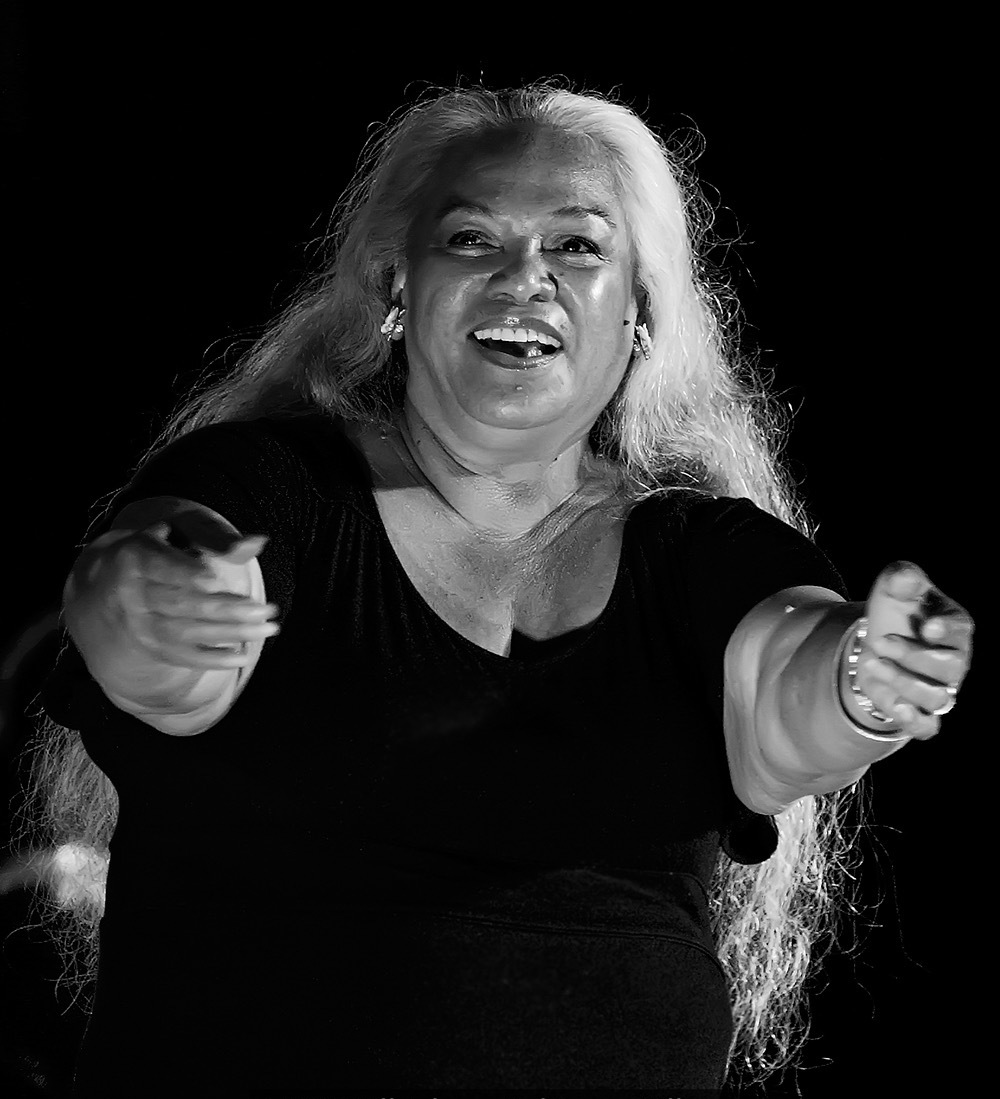
- Born: March 19, 1946; Keaukaha, Hilo, Hawaii Territory, U.S.
- Died: January 3, 2026 (aged 79); Keaukaha, Hilo, Hawaii, U.S.
- Occupation: Kumu hula
- Years active: 1960–2026
- Spouse: Sig Zane
- Children: Kūhaʻo Zane
- Mother: Edith Kanakaʻole
- Relatives: Pualani Kanakaʻole Kanahele (sister); Huihui Kanahele-Mossman (niece)

Nālani Kanakaʻole (March 19, 1946 – January 3, 2026) was a Hawaiian kumu hula (hula teacher) at Hālau o Kekuhi, the dance company. The daughter of Edith Kanakaʻole, she led Hālau o Kekuhi along with her niece Huihui Kanahele-Mossman. In 1993, she and her sister, Pualani Kanakaʻole Kanahele, were jointly named National Heritage Fellows by the National Endowment for the Arts, which recognized them as "Hula Masters".

== Early life and education ==
Born on March 19, 1946, Kanakaʻole was raised on homestead lands in Keaukaha, Hilo, Hawaii, in a traditional Hawaiian fashion. She first learned hula from her grandmother, Mary Kekuewa Kanaele Fujii. She was 13 years old when her mother Edith Kanakaʻole started work as a hula teacher, and began teaching hula herself at the age of 14 in 1960. Her family spoke the Hawaiian language at home.

== Career ==
In 1985, Kanakaʻole opened Sig Zane Designs alongside her husband, Sig Zane.

== Personal life and death ==
In 1982, Kanakaʻole and Sig Zane had a son, Kūhaʻo Zane.

Kanaka’ole died in Hilo on January 3, 2026, at the age of 79.
