= The Pandora Project =

- DVD cover
- Directed by: John Terlesky; Jim Wynorski
- Written by: John Terlesky; Jim Wynorski
- Produced by: Stephen Maynard; Holly Simpson
- Starring: Daniel Baldwin; Erika Eleniak; Richard Tyson; Tony Todd; Bo Jackson; Jeff Yagher
- Cinematography: Andrea V. Rossotto
- Edited by: Daniel Duncan
- Music by: Deddy Tzur
- Distributed by: CineTel Films
- Release date: July 1998 (Spain)
- Running time: 89 minutes
- Country: United States
- Language: English

The Pandora Project is an action film released in 1998. The film stars Daniel Baldwin, Erika Eleniak, Tony Todd and Bo Jackson.

== Plot ==
When a former CIA agent steals a weapon that kills people without harming buildings, a former CIA associate has to stop him, all before getting married in a few days.

== Cast ==
- Daniel Baldwin as Captain John Lacy
- Erika Eleniak as Wendy Lane
- Richard Tyson as Captain William Stenwick
- Tony Todd as CIA Director Garrett Houtman
- Jeff Yagher as Bruce Bobbins
- Bo Jackson as Manson

== Production ==
John Terlesky directed the opening scene and several second unit shots.

== Release ==
The film was released first in Spain during July 1998. On February 9, 1999, the film premiered on video in the United States.
