= Live Shot =

- Genre: Drama
- Created by: Steve Marshall; Dan Guntzelman
- Starring: Jeff Yagher; Cheryl Pollak; Spencer Klein; David Birney; Eddie Velez; Antonia Jones; Bruce McGill; Wanda De Jesus; Hill Harper; Sam Anderson; Rebecca Staab; Michael Watson
- Composers: Art Ford; Karl Lundeberg
- Country of origin: United States
- Original language: English
- No. of seasons: 1
- No. of episodes: 13

Production
- Editors: Tad Nyland; Alec Smight
- Running time: 60 minutes
- Production companies: Steve Marshall Productions; Occasionally Brillant; Rysher Entertainment; Hallmark Entertainment

Original release
- Network: UPN
- Release: August 29 – November 28, 1995

Live Shot is an American drama television series that aired on UPN from August 29 to November 28, 1995. It starred Jeff Yagher, Cheryl Pollak, Spencer Klein, Eddie Velez, Antonia Jones, Bruce McGill, Wanda De Jesus, Hill Harper, Sam Anderson, Rebecca Staab, and Michael Watson. Karen Austin, Debra Eisenstadt, Leigh Hall, Ana Gabriel, Evan Arnold, Yolanda Gaskins, Morgan Hunter, Terry Kiser, Nia Long, Tom Byrd, Marie Marshall, and Chase Masterson were all recurring on the show.

== Premise ==
The show centered on fictional television station, KXZX, in Los Angeles's Re-Action News. It was an ensemble piece, with no true main character. Most notable in the show's run was an early use of an ongoing story arc centering on the murder of a Los Angeles socialite. As the show was canceled with little warning, the story arc was never resolved. Also, sports reporter Lou Waller came out of the closet in the last act of the last episode to air. Consequently, the fallout of this event was never shown.

== Cast and characters ==
=== Main ===
- Jeff Yagher as Alex Rydell – The new News Director of KXZX's Re-Action News team. Immediately before joining the team he was working as a news director for a Boston station. Alex's wife decides not to join him in LA, and instead sends their son, Sean, to be with the father alone. One of his problems was dealing both with the stresses of his new job and being a newly single parent. Throughout the show's short run there was a growing attraction between, Alex and one of his producers, Nancy. However the show was canceled before the outcome could be decided.
- Cheryl Pollak as Nancy Lockridge – The Eleven O'Clock News producer. While she was attracted to Alex, she was also reluctant to begin a relationship with him as he was newly separated and had a son, plus he was her boss. In the final episode that aired it appeared as though Alex's wife might want a reconciliation and Nancy encouraged Alex to give his marriage another try for the sake of his son.
- Spencer Klein as Sean Rydell – Alex's young son. His mother had chosen not to come to LA and sent him to be with his father alone.
- David Birney as Harry Chandler "The Beacon of Truth" Moore – The vain, pompous senior news anchor at KXZX. Harry had a love/hate relationship with his co-anchor Sherry Beck. Despite their constant behind the scenes bickering the two of them had an affair.
- Eddie Velez as Ricardo Sandoval – A 28-year-old study in macho good looks. Ricardo was a "Re-Action News" anchor and reporter who had been known to focus more attention on the creases in his expensive trousers than the story he's been assigned to cover.
- Antonia Jones as Peggy Traynor – The news traffic controller. From crashing her car with a faulty brake repair job into Helen Forbes' Mercedes Benz to saving the day when a disastrous fight between Tommy Greer and "Fast" Eddie Santini breaks out in the midst of a live broadcast knocking over the camera, Peggy dealt with every issue in the news room with a cheerful disposition and a desire to please.
- Bruce McGill as Joe Vitale – "Re–Action News" Executive producer.
- Wanda De Jesus as Liz Vega – Investigative news reporter for "Re–Action News".
- Hill Harper as Tommy Greer – News reporter for "Re–Action News".
- Sam Anderson as Marvin Seaborne – News commenter for "Re–Action News".
- Rebecca Staab as Sherry Beck – The co–anchor of "Re–Action News".
- Michael Watson as 'Fast' Eddie Santini – A camera operator, specializing in live shots for "Re–Action News".

=== Recurring ===
- Karen Austin as Helen Forbes
- Ron Canada as Bill Simon
- David Coburn as Rick Evers
- Debra Eisenstadt as a director
- Leigh Hall as Lissa
- Ana Gabriel as a director
- Evan Arnold as Brian Cayhill
- Yolanda Gaskins as Rayneta
- Morgan Hunter as Spiro Stavros
- Terry Kiser as Raymond Piskoff
- Nia Long as Romona Greer
- Tom Byrd as Sportscaster Lou Waller
- Marie Marshall as Rosie Pomeranz
- Chase Masterson as Sheila Rydell
- Naya Rivera as Ann

== Episodes ==
| No. | Title | Directed by | Written by | Original release date |
|---|---|---|---|---|
| 1 | "Day One" | Colin Bucksey | Steve Marshall & Dan Guntzelman | August 29, 1995 |
The newly hired news director arrives in time to find the investigative news team tracking down the biggest society scandal to break in years. Guest stars: Otto Coehlo, Laurie O'Brien, and Casey Biggs
| 2 | "Another Day, Another Story" | Colin Bucksey | Unknown | August 29, 1995 |
Unknown Guest stars: Dion Anderson, Otto Coelho, Laurie O'Brien, Molly Orr, John Schuck, and Naya Rivera
| 3 | "T.G.I.F." | Anson Williams | Steve Marshall & Dan Guntzelman | September 5, 1995 |
Alex realizes his marriage is over. Guest stars: Otto Coehlo, J. W. Myers, Charles Grant, Wendy Braun, Henry Urgoiti and Zack Eginton
| 4 | "A Death in the Family" | Anson Williams | Steve Marshall & Dan Guntzelman | September 12, 1995 |
The News Brothers continue their side video business. Guest stars: Darryl Henriques, Peter Elbling, Emile Hamaty, Ginta Rae, Zack Eginton, M. Darnell Suttles, and Henry Urgioti
| 5 | "For Whom the Stinkin' Bell Tolls" | Scott Brazil | Steve Marshall & Dan Guntzelman | September 19, 1995 |
Someone holds up an abortion clinic. Guest stars: Emile Hamaty, Bill Kirchenbauer, Curtis Taylor, Josie Dapar, Shelley Morrison, Kevin McBride, Jae Woo Lee, Clifton Collins Jr., and Elizabeth Lamont
| 6 | "The Forgotten Episode" | Gil Stilton | Lissa Levin | September 26, 1995 |
Harry's contract is up for renewal. Guest stars: Emile Hamaty, Randy O'Connell, Rick Scarry, Ashlee Levitch, Gabe Cohen, Hal Landon Jr, Wendy Walsh, Christine Healy, and Kurt Fuller
| 7 | "Where Towering Infernos" | Anson Williams | Jeff Stein | October 2, 1995 |
The station General Manager seeks a sexual encounter with a commentator. Guest stars: Melissa Christopher, Greg Wrangler, Chuck Bailey, Bill Erwin, and Cully Fredricksen
| 8 | "Shake, Rattle and Roll" | Vern Gillum | Steve Marshall | October 17, 1995 |
An earthquake hits Los Angeles and everyone is called into emergency service. Guest stars: Danielle Weiner, Ann Ryerson, Suzanne Goddard, Arthur Burghardt, Amy Povich
| 9 | "What Price Episode?" | Anson Williams | Dan Guntzelman | October 24, 1995 |
Peggy crashes her car into Hellen's. Guest stars: Emile Hamaty, Matt Love, Amy Povich, Karen Ludwig, Carol Bruce, George "Buck" Flower, Lou Richards, Ben Stein, and Don Brunner
| 10 | "Miracle" | Kristoffer Tabori | Steve Marshall | November 7, 1995 |
A shadow resembling the Virgin Mary suddenly appears with the overnight recovery of a Hispanic shooting victim. Guest stars: Christy Alvarez, Stella Garcia, John William Young, Marga Chavez, Wayne Alexander, Nicholas Pryor, Robert Madrid, and Jacqueline Obradors
| 11 | "Today Is the First Day of the Rest of Your Contract" | Vern Gillum | Del Shores | November 14, 1995 |
Ricardo, Eddie and Nancy go to an orphanage. Guest stars: Saemi Nakamura, John Peacock, Phillip C. Curry, Raymond Woods, Noel Webb, Bonnie Urseth, Jonathan Carrasco, Romeo Rene Fabian, Tina New, Steve Marshall, Cheryl Bartel, Robert Madrid, Carlos Carrasco, Jacqueline Obradors
| 12 | "Love Is a Mainly Splintered Thing" | Martha Mitchell | S : Steve Marshall and Dan Guntzelman; T : Christopher Ames and Carolyn Shelby | November 21, 1995 |
Tommy moves onto Eddie's houseboat while Eddie moves in with Tommy's wife. Guest stars: Emile Hamaty, David Carrera, Ethan Glazer, Chuck Bailey, Carmen Filpi, Jacqueline Collen, Brian McGovern, Derik Ross Hixon, Fred Orenstein
| 13 | "Decisions, Decisions" | Scott Brazil | Dan Guntzelman | November 28, 1995 |
A press conference is held for a gay radical group. Guest stars: Emile Hamaty, Steve Marshall, Brian McGovern, Bart Sumner, Cliff Cozens, Ben Stein, and Nicholas Ross Oleson
