= Lisa Fuller =

American actress

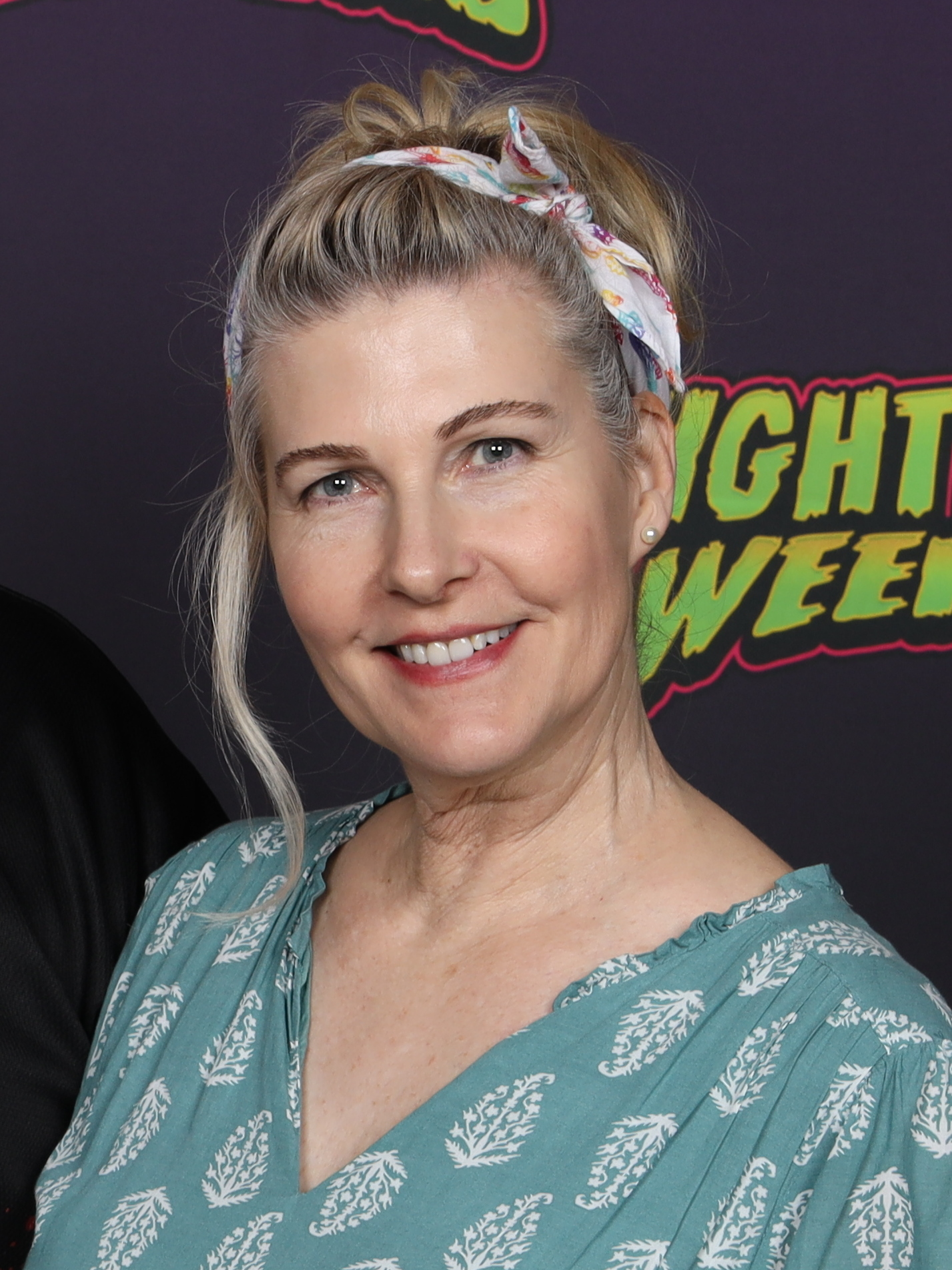
Fuller in 2024

Lisa Fuller is an American actress best known for her work in movies such as The Monster Squad (1987) and Night Life (1989). She also starred in the movie Teen Witch (1989).

She is married to fellow actor Dan Gauthier.

== Filmography ==
Year	Title	Role	Notes
1986	Mr. Belvedere	Dagmar	Episode: "Dinner for Two"
1986	The New Mike Hammer	Ondine	Episode: "Mistress for the Prosecution"
1986-1988	The New Gidget	Alexis	3 episodes
1987	Final Destination Unknown	Angela	Short
1987	Fame	Rocket Cola Girl	Episode: "The Lounge Singer Who Knew Too Much"
1987	21 Jump Street	Nikki	Episode: "16 Blown to 35"
1987	The Monster Squad	Patrick's Sister	
1987	Baby Boom	Stacy	
1987	ABC Afterschool Specials	Actress	Episode: "The Kid Who Wouldn't Quit: The Brad Silverman Story"
1987	Rags to Riches	Actress	Episode: "Once in a Lifeguard"
1988	Boys Will Be Boys	Tracy	Episode: "The Girl Next Door"
1988	Bring Me the Head of Dobie Gills	Eloise	
1988	Charles in Charge	Buyer of Charles	Episode: "Where the Auction Is"
1988	Earth Girls Are Easy	Kikki	
1988-1989	Head of the Class	Tami	3 episodes
1989	Freddy's Nightmares	Julie	Episode: "School Daze"
1989	Teen Witch	Randa	
1989	How I Got Into College	Game Show Hostess	
1989	Night Life	Joanie Snowland	
1989	An Eight Is Enough Wedding	Rebekka	Made-for-TV film
1989	Doogie Howser, M.D.	Katie/Kelly	Episode: "Simply Irresistible"
1989	Anything But Love	Tawny	Episode: "Just The Facts, Ma'am"
1989	Terrifying Tales	Angela	Segment: "Final Destination: Unknown"
1990	General Hospital	Dawn Winthrop	22 episodes
1990	Going Places	Brie	Episode: "Born to Be Mild"
1990-1991	The Fresh Prince of Bel-Air	Toni	4 episodes
1992	Freshman Dorm	Cynthia	5 episodes
1992	Out All Night	Toni	Episode: "The Great Pretender"
1994	Frogmen	Young Woman	
2008	The Art of Getting Over It	Chrissy	Short
