= Strange Frame =

Strange Frame: Love & Sax
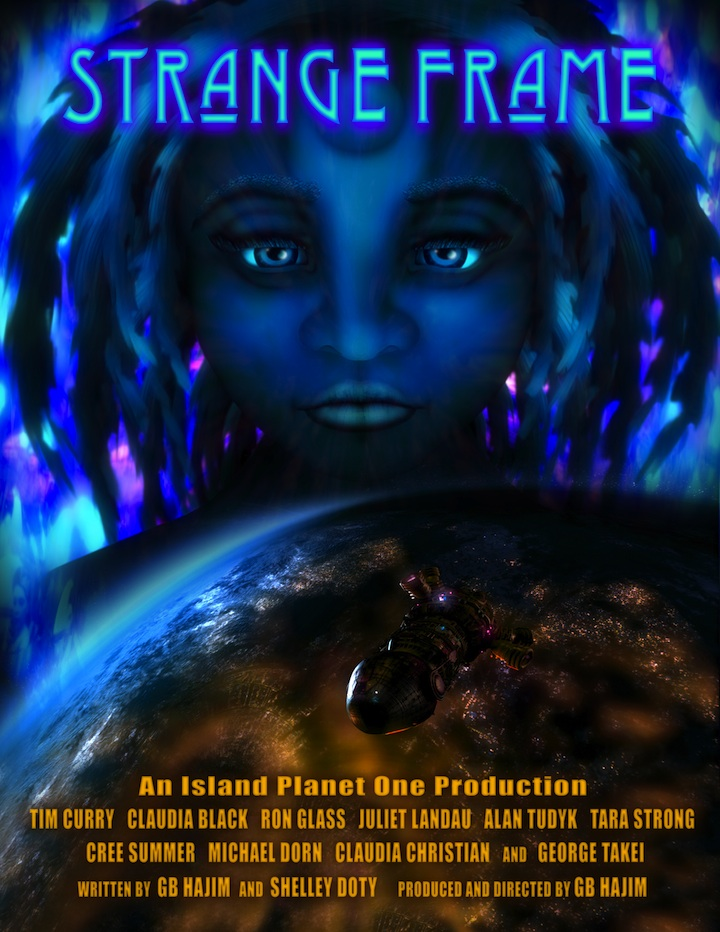
- Film poster
- Directed by: G.B. Hajim
- Written by: Shelley Doty; G.B. Hajim; Peter Watts
- Produced by: G.B. Hajim
- Starring: Tim Curry; Claudia Black; Ron Glass; Juliet Landau; Alan Tudyk; Tara Strong; Cree Summer; Michael Dorn; Claudia Christian; George Takei
- Cinematography: G.B. Hajim
- Edited by: David C. Hughes; Brandon Proctor
- Music by: Shelley Doty; Dawn Richardson; Roger Waters; Jessica Lurie; David Pellicciaro
- Production companies: Screaming Wink Productions; Island Planet One Productions
- Distributed by: Wolfe Releasing
- Release date: May 3, 2012 (Sci-Fi-London)
- Running time: 98 minutes
- Country: United States
- Language: English
- Budget: $1.2 million

Strange Frame: Love & Sax (often referred to as simply Strange Frame) is a 2012 American romantic science fiction comedy-drama film directed by G. B. Hajim and written by G.B. Hajim and Shelley Doty. Created using cutout animation, the film was slated as the world's first animated lesbian-themed sci-fi film. It stars an ensemble voice cast, led by Claudia Black, Tara Strong and Tim Curry, and features Firefly alums Ron Glass (in his final film role) and Alan Tudyk.

Clips debuted at the Los Angeles Bent-Con on December 3, 2011 and the completed film premiered in London on May 3, 2012.

== Plot ==
Set at the end of the 28th century, the human race has long since abandoned a desolate earth, colonizing Jupiter's moons, particularly Ganymede. Most of the refugees fleeing earth did so in exchange for an agreement of indentured servitude, projected to last "at most" one or two generations. However, this proved untrue, and by the 28th century a large portion of the population are in permanent debt bondage from birth. Naia (Tara Strong) is one such debt slave, genetically modified to have enhanced lung capacity in order to survive harsher work environments.

During a protest riot, Naia is freed with many other debt slaves from a holding cell on Ganymede. As she flees she encounters Parker (Claudia Black), a street saxophone performer being set upon by city police who incorrectly believe she is part of the riots. Naia saves Parker from a beating, with Parker later returning the favor. The two ultimately escape and quickly find themselves becoming attracted to each other, and soon after are in a romantic relationship and are living together.

Both musicians, Naia and Parker begin composing music together, Parker's saxophone complementing Naia's guitar and singing. The two join with friends Chat (Alan Tudyk) and Atem (Khary Payton) and form a band, quickly rising in popularity and notoriety owing to Naia's passionate, anti-debt slavery lyrics. This soon attracts the attention of Ganymede "starmaker" Dorlan Mig (Tim Curry), who invites Parker and Naia to a party at a high-class club where he can discuss signing the band to his company. At the party both Naia and Parker indulge in several exotic treats, culminating in a rare vintage alcohol which renders both of them unconscious.

Parker awakes in an alley in Ganymede's slums and soon discovers that Naia and the rest of the band have been signed without her. She tries to make contact with Naia several times, only to be dissuaded (often violently) by the rising star's bouncers, who inform her that Naia does not want to see her anymore. Heartbroken, Parker spends weeks lurking near Naia's studio. She soon finds herself needing to leave the area after district police label her a troublemaker. She finds a sympathetic ear in Captain Philo D Grenman (Ron Glass), a hoverchair-bound double amputee who buys her breakfast one morning. After hearing her story, Philo offers Parker a home on his non-operational spaceship; Parker accepts, and soon settles in with Philo and his first officer Reesa (Cree Summer), the only other person on the ship.

Weeks pass, Parker tracking Naia's progress via news feeds. After seeing reports of a number of troubling incidents - Atem dying in a mysterious shuttle crash, Chat leaving the band due to a previously unknown drug addiction, and another talent signed to Dorlan's company dying just as her popularity peaked - Parker realizes that Dorlan is going to have Naia killed in order to maximize the popularity of her music. She strikes a deal with Philo and Reesa: if she buys them the last part needed to make the ship operational, using money from selling her antique saxophone, Philo and Reesa will help her recover Naia before she can be killed. Parker makes her way to a massive Naia concert, but after listening to her unemotional performance she realizes that the Naia on stage is actually an android duplicate, meaning the real Naia is being held somewhere else. She, Philo, and Reesa update their plans.

Parker infiltrates the fake Naia's luxury apartment, with friends of hers providing a distraction. She confronts the fake Naia, incapacitates her, then grabs her. When security forces arrive Parker flees down the side of the building on Philo's loaned hoverchair, accidentally dropping the Naia android in the process. Though damaged, Parker recovers it and is soon picked up by Philo, who has stolen Dorlan's car. Philo flees from the police while Parker searches the android's databanks for Naia's location, eventually finding it. Successfully evading the police, Philo and Parker find the lab where Naia has been held, being used as a template to better enhance the Naia android's behavior. Naia is near death but alive; Parker rescues her, leaving the android in her place and setting the lab on fire.

Naia is placed in a medical treatment device on Philo's ship, Parker is unsure if she will survive. The destroyed lab is investigated; finding remains which seem to match Naia, the authorities declare Naia dead. Dorlan is soon arrested for his presumed involvement in the lab and Naia's death, especially since his car was found just outside. After some time, Naia finally awakes on the ship, greeting Parker lovingly.

== Cast ==
- Claudia Black as Parker C. Boyd
- Tara Strong as Naia X.
- Ron Glass as Philo D. Grenman
- Cree Summer as Reesa Abi Kiran Ariana Livingston III
- Tim Curry as Dorlan Mig
- Juliet Landau as Bitsea
- Alan Tudyk as Chat
- George Takei as Tamadamsa
- Michael Dorn as Guardship Commander
- Claudia Christian as Zev
- Lena Horne as Ethel Andrews (archive footage)
- Dawnn Lewis as Malora
- Vanessa Marshall as Chandra Childs
- Khary Payton as Atem
- April Winchell as Pawnbroker
- Dave Fennoy as News Anchor

== Production ==
=== Background ===
The project began in 1999 when G. B. Hajim and Shelley Doty decided to collaborate on a project using their individual talents and their passion for science fiction, especially that of John Varley and Shinichiro Watanabe. They agreed that some of the protagonists had to be gay, bisexual, transsexual and omnisexual. All had to be of color because they believed that not too long from now everyone would be of color. They also were clear that the issue of race and sex would be non-issues in the setting of the 29th century.

They began with creating a backstory and television series done in Hajim's unique cutout animation style, and began marketing the film. In 2001, MTV made an offer to finance the film, which included MTV owning all copyrights to the project including ancillary rights. In 2002, Doty and Hajim sketched out the arc for a tetralogy and wrote the screenplay Strange Frame: Love & Sax that was planned as the first installment in what they anticipated would become a series.

=== Pre-production ===
In fall 2004, pre-production began. Hajim had an offer to produce the film overseas, but was committed to enriching life in his local community. Hajim resides in East Hawaii, which is one of the most economically depressed parts of the state. He went to the local high schools and colleges to find talented youth to train for this project. From a pool of applicants, he trained fourteen artists ages ranging from 13 to 23 in computer art and animation. They recorded the initial dialog at Palm Records on the island just a month before the sound engineer and owner, Charles Brotman, won a Grammy Award.

Part of the decision to go with cutout style instead of CG was one of creating a sustainable industry in East Hawaii. CG is being done all over the globe, with most productions doing their animation work in Asia. The utilization of an uncommon medium set up a distinct regional production pipeline .

=== Production ===
In 2005, pre-production was completed and actual animation of the feature began. Each semester, high school students joined the team through the Hui'ana Mentorship Program sponsored by the Hawaii State Department of Education. Over forty interns trained at the small building which held the production facility. Hajim continued to reach out to the different schools around the state to find talent that might otherwise have left for the mainland or, worse, not find a home for their abilities.

In 2008, Academy Award-winning mixer Gary Rizzo of Skywalker Sound joined the team vowing to create the surround sound experience. In 2011, Rizzo completed the sound mix and Strange Frame was briefly repped by Jeff Dowd aka the Dude.

== Release ==
Clips of Strange Frame had debut screening in Los Angeles at Bent-Con on December 3, 2011. The film premiered at Sci-Fi-London on May 3, 2012.

=== Critical response ===
Shelagh Rowan-Legg from Screen Anarchy was at the premiere and had this to say, "...it is so refreshing to see a film as unique, original and enjoyable as Strange Frame...Strange Frame is a rare film: inspiration by other forms is noticeable, but it is not merely repetition or homage. It is a dreamscape, one that does not shy away from the ugly, yet celebrates the beautiful."

The judges at Dragon*Con 2012 named Strange Frame Best Feature Film.

Danielle Riendeau at AfterEllen.com called Strange Frame "the trippiest lesbian movie ever made....If ever you wondered what a truly unhinged mash-up of the dominant production styles of Heavy Metal, Barbarella and Blade Runner would look like, here’s your chance."

In 2013, Strange Frame won Best Animated Feature at the Big Island Film Festival.

The Weirdcademy Awards bestowed Strange Frame with both the award of Weirdest Movie of 2013 and Weirdest Actress Award to Claudia Black for her voiceover performance as saxophonist Parker.

Strange Frame was discussed in academic circles in regards to Black Queer studies such as Black Queer Diaspora Aesthetics at University of Texas at Austin and the Formation of Cyberpunk as a category of music.

== See also ==
- List of animated feature-length films
