= Wet Gold =

1984 American television adventure film directed by Dick Lowry

- DVD cover
- Genre: Adventure; Drama
- Written by: David Sherwin; Otis Jones
- Directed by: Dick Lowry
- Starring: Brooke Shields; Burgess Meredith; Thomas Byrd; Brian Kerwin
- Music by: Sylvester Levay
- Country of origin: United States
- Original language: English

Production
- Executive producers: Frank Konigsberg; Larry Sanitsky
- Producer: Bill Coker
- Production location: Bahamas
- Cinematography: James Pergola
- Editor: Artie Mandelberg
- Running time: 91 minutes
- Production companies: Konigsberg/Sanitsky Company; Telepictures Corporation

Original release
- Network: ABC
- Release: October 28, 1984

Wet Gold is a 1984 American made-for-television adventure film directed by Dick Lowry and starring actress-model Brooke Shields. The film originally aired on October 28, 1984, on ABC.

== Plot summary ==
Laura is a young café waitress dreaming of owning a piano. Laura stumbles across Sampson, a drunk elderly man who fills her with exciting stories of a boat that sank with millions of dollars in gold. Although Chris Barnes, Laura's boyfriend, keeps telling her that Sampson's stories are all false, Sampson makes her believe that they are indeed true. Laura takes Sampson to a library, where she finds on old a newspaper article that matches up the events he described.

After becoming a true believer, Laura convinces Barnes, Sampson and Ben Keating, an experienced sea diver, to search for the treasure. Together they set off from Key West in the baker's boat that Barnes is supposed to be looking after. Keating shows a liking for Laura, and because of this, Barnes begins to feel uncomfortable with him. After spending some time in the water, their dreams become reality, but the discovery of gold begins to change their personalities. Tensions fill the air as passions rise in the wake of greed and jealousy for both the fortune and Laura.

== Main cast ==
- Brooke Shields as Laura
- Burgess Meredith as Sampson
- Thomas Byrd as Chris Barnes
- Brian Kerwin as Ben Keating

== Ratings ==
Upon its premiere, the movie was the highest rated network TV program in its 9-11PM time slot. But when it repeated on Sunday December 21, 1986, it was the lowest rated network TV program of the evening. The highest rated one was NBC's holiday special Bob Hope's Bagful of Christmas Cheer, on which Hope's co-stars included Wet Gold star Brooke Shields.
