= Cheryl Pollak =

American actress, director, producer (born 1967)

- Born: August 31, 1967 (age 58); Scottsdale, Arizona, U.S.
- Occupations: Actress, director, producer
- Years active: 1986–2012
- Spouse: Richard Murphy (m. 1999)

Cheryl Pollak (born August 31, 1967) is an American former actress, director and producer. Her last screen role was the direct-to-video Time of Fear (2002), while her last director/producer work was the animated video short Jasper: A Fabulous Fourth (2012).

== Biography ==
Pollak was born in Scottsdale, Arizona and grew up in Greenville, Texas. She graduated from Eisenhower High School in 1985.

She got her start in the entertainment business starring in a series of Jordache jeans commercials. She made her film debut in My Best Friend Is a Vampire. She was in the main cast of four television series that were cancelled after – or pulled off the air during – their first season: Hull High (1990, three episodes unaired), The Heights (1992, one episode unaired), Hotel Malibu (1994), and Live Shot (1995).

== Personal life ==
Pollak has been married to actor Richard Murphy since 1999.

== Partial filmography ==
- My Best Friend Is a Vampire...Darla Blake (1987)
- 21 Jump Street (TV series)...Diana (1988)
- The Dark Side of the Sun...Frances (1988)
- Night Life...Charly (1989)
- Alien Nation (TV series)...Kirby Sikes (1989)
- What's Alan Watching (TV pilot)...Alyssa (1989)
- Pump Up the Volume...Paige Woodward (1990)
- Hull High (TV series)...Camilla (1990)
- The Hidden Room (TV series)...Young Woman (1991)
- The Marla Hanson Story (a.k.a. Face Value)... Marla Hanson (1991)
- Quantum Leap (TV series)... Katie McBain (1991)
- The Heights (TV series)... Rita MacDougal (1992)
- Crossing the Bridge...Carol Brockton (1992)
- Hotel Malibu (TV series)...Stephane "Stevie" Mayfield (1994)
- Melrose Place (TV series)...Susan Madsen (1994)
- Live Shot (TV series)...Nancy Lockridge (1995)
- JAG (TV series)... Gloria Goldberg (2001)
- Time of Fear... Cheryl Hammer (2002)
