= The Hidden Room (TV series) =

- Created by: Gail Glaze; Lewis Chesler
- Country of origin: United States
- Original language: English
- No. of seasons: 2
- No. of episodes: 33

Production
- Executive producers: Lewis Chesler; David Perlmutter
- Running time: 30 minutes

Original release
- Network: Lifetime
- Release: July 23, 1991 – November 6, 1993

The Hidden Room is an American drama-horror anthology television series geared mainly towards women, which aired on the Lifetime cable network for 33 episodes from 1991 to 1993. Each episode usually centered around a woman in a hardship, but with a dark Twilight Zone-ish twist. Most episodes starred a well-known actress in the lead role.

The first season was hosted by a mysterious woman (Mimi Kuzyk) who spoke cryptically. She was credited only as the woman in the hidden room. The second season had no host and in 1993, when Lifetime aired repeats of some first-season episodes, the scenes with the host were edited out.

== Episodes ==
=== Season 1 (1991) ===
No. overall	No. in season	Title	Directed by	Written by	Original release date
1	1	"Dream Child"	Jerry Ciccoritti	Jane Anderson	July 23, 1991
After the stillborn birth of her child, a woman (Alice Krige) disconnects herself from her husband and retreats to the comfort of a fantasy world.
2	2	"Splinters of Privacy"	Eleanore Lindo	A.H. Davis and Mona Simpson	July 30, 1991
A young woman (Lara Flynn Boyle) in college confronts and ultimately reveals that she is an incest victim at the hands of her father.
3	3	"Wasting Away"	Jerry Ciccoritti	Larry DiTillio and Holly Huckins	August 6, 1991
During a long night spent alone, a tormented former model (Helen Slater) confronts her demons, which come to her in the form of her own shadow, which appears to be devouring all her food.
4	4	"Spirit Cabinet"	Leon Marr	Naomi Janzen	August 13, 1991
An injured athlete (Melissa Gilbert) moves into a new house with her husband. Through a haunted cabinet she is transported through time and space to a Victorian seance, where the participants believe her to be a ghost.
5	5	"To the Orchards"	Christian Duguay	Alison Lea Bingeman	August 20, 1991
A police woman loses her partner in a near-death experience and must confront her guilt. Heidi von Palleske, Marc Gomes and Paul Popowich star.
6	6	"A Friend in Need"	Bruce Pittman	Susan Martin	August 27, 1991
A successful writer (Marg Helgenberger) faces her painful childhood memories and feelings of resentment toward her mother. She finds strength by calling on her childhood imaginary friend.
7	7	"Let Death Do Us Part"	Graeme Campbell	Marilyn Levy and Edithe Swensen	September 3, 1991
When a young widow (Barbara Williams) is tempted to sleep with her hunky, shirtless hired hand (Chris Potter), her jealous husband's ghost intervenes.
8	8	"Taking Back the Night"	Jorge Montesi	Gail Glaze and Patrick McGrath	September 10, 1991
A woman living in New York develops a strange power as a defense mechanism to help her cope with an overwhelming fear of the city. Dana Ashbrook and Krista Bridges guest star.
9	9	"Little Nightmares, Little Dreams"	Jerry Ciccoritti	Alison Lea Bingeman	September 17, 1991
An older couple finds an instructional book on how to share the same dreams in their sleep. Because the wife (Audra Lindley) worries that her ailing husband will die, their shared dream reflects this fear.
10	10	"A Type of Love Story"	Leon Marr	Jane Anderson and Russell Banks	September 24, 1991
A plain-looking woman (Amanda Plummer) has a brief affair with a dashing executive (David James Elliott), who eventually fails to see her true beauty.
11	11	"Dream of the Wolf"	Jorge Montesi	Patrick McGrath	October 1, 1991
A businessman (Adam Arkin) becomes so consumed with his recurring dreams of being a wolf that it starts to interfere with his job and his marriage to his unfaithful wife.
12	12	"Death of the Right Fielder"	Jerry Ciccoritti	Naomi Janzen	October 8, 1991
A young woman (Cheryl Pollak) is torn between her desire to be a baseball player and the responsibilities of adult life.
13	13	"Rogue in the Bathroom"	Risa Bramon Garcia	Susan Rhinehart	October 15, 1991
Sheila McCarthy guest stars.

=== Season 2 (1993) ===
No. overall	No. in season	Title	Directed by	Written by	Original release date
14	1	"Dangerous Dreams"	Eleanore Lindo	Naomi Janzen and Jeremy Lipp	June 12, 1993
A woman (Amanda Donohoe) marries a recent widower (Geraint Wyn Davies) whose teenage daughter (Sarah Polley) sees her as an impostor.
15	2	"Love Crimes"	Jorge Montesi	Jeannie Elias	June 19, 1993
A woman (Helen Mirren) alters her identity to play a mysterious red-haired seductress who targets an antiques dealer named Jack.
16	3	"While She Was Out"	Jorge Montesi	Jeremy Lipp and Edward Bryant	June 26, 1993
After leaving a mall, a woman (Stephanie Zimbalist) is confronted by four teenage attackers intent on killing her. *Note: This episode was later remade as the 2008 feature film While She Was Out starring Kim Basinger.
17	4	"Hungry Girls"	Unknown	Joanna Russ	July 3, 1993
A businesswoman (Ally Sheedy) experiences a revelation after meeting a homeless girl.
18	5	"Transfigured Night"	Jorge Montesi	Unknown	July 10, 1993
When Deborah is abandoned at a party by her husband, she is forced to make her way home. She accepts a ride from a female trucker.
19	6	"Jillie"	Unknown	Naomi Janzen	July 17, 1993
A teenage girl (Mayim Bialik) runs away from home and is hidden in an attic by her younger cousin, who is enamored of her.
20	7	"After the Crash"	Unknown	Unknown	July 24, 1993
An unmarried woman (Tess Harper) is inadvertently reunited with the son who never knew she existed.
21	8	"The Faithful Follower"	Unknown	Naomi Janzen	July 31, 1993
A conflicted young political aide (Daphne Zuniga) defends her boss against allegations of womanizing. Later she is killed in an accident, while trying to rebuff his sexual advances.
22	9	"Dreams About Water"	Unknown	Unknown	August 7, 1993
A gay psychologist's health deteriorates due to his HIV positive status. He gets comfort from his boyfriend and his coworker Lydia. Tom Hulce guest stars.
23	10	"Stark in Love"	Unknown	Unknown	August 14, 1993
A terrorist (Mariel Hemingway) who has been living a double life is forced to face the lover she has deceived.
24	11	"Happily Ever After"	Bruce McDonald	Gail Glaze	August 21, 1993
A new marriage turns nightmarish as a woman (Megan Follows) finally discovers the truth about her husband.
25	12	"The First Battle"	Unknown	Unknown	August 28, 1993
A career woman (Catherine O'Hara) and her husband are faced with the prospect of losing their adopted son.
26	13	"Her Life as a Dog"	Unknown	Naomi Janzen	September 4, 1993
A struggling young artist (Linda Purl) learns the meaning of responsibility.
27	14	"Passages"	Unknown	Unknown	September 11, 1993
A professor (John Glover) encounters a woman (Kathleen Robertson) who insists that her dreams reveal an incident from his past.
28	15	"My Sister's Keeper"	Unknown	Naomi Janzen	September 18, 1993
A woman's life is disrupted by her younger sister's erratic behavior. Cynthia Stevenson guest stars.
29	16	"No Word for Mercy"	Don McBrearty	Naomi Janzen	September 25, 1993
A nurse (Ann Magnuson) is faced with a fateful decision when her young lover threatens to tell her husband about the affair.
30	17	"Refuge"	Unknown	Unknown	October 2, 1993
Kathleen Quinlan guest stars.
31	18	"Best Intentions"	Unknown	Unknown	October 9, 1993
Sheila Kelley guest stars.
32	19	"The Third Option"	Unknown	Unknown	October 23, 1993
Henry Czerny and Faith Ford guest star.
33	20	"Marion and Jean"	Joseph L. Scanlan	Jeremy Lipp	November 6, 1993
Two young women must come to terms with events from their teen years. Roxana Zal and Kim Huffman guest star.
