= Keiki Kawaiʻaeʻa =

Hawaiian linguist

Academic work
- Discipline: Linguistics
- Institutions: University of Hawaii at Hilo

Keiki Kawaiʻaeʻa is an associate professor at the University of Hawaii at Hilo where she serves as Director of the Ka Haka ʻUla O Keʻelikōlani College of Hawaiian Language. Dr. Kawaiʻaeʻa holds a doctorate from Union Institute & University, a Professional Diploma in Elementary Education from Chaminade University, a Master of Education degree in Curriculum & Instruction from the University of Hawaiʻi at Mānoa, and a BA in Hawaiian Studies from the University of Hawaiʻi at Mānoa.

Kawaiʻaeʻa serves on the Native Hawaiian Education Council and she is a founder of Ulukau, The Hawaiian Electronic Library.

== Awards and distinctions ==
- Kawaiʻaeʻa won the University of Hawaiʻi Koichi and Taniyo Taniguchi Award for Excellence in Innovation in 2011.
- Kawaiʻaeʻa won the Dr. Henrietta Mann Leadership Award in 2015. This annual award recognizes leadership by Native Alaskans, Native Hawaiians, and Native Americans who have shown outstanding leadership and dedication to Native students and Indigenous communities.
- Kawaiʻaeʻa was invited to deliver a plenary address at the 45th annual convention of the National Indian Educatorʻs Association in 2014.

== Publications ==
- In Press. Kawaiʻaeʻa, K., Kahumoku III, W., Hussey, S. M., Krug Jr, G. K., Makuakāne- Drechsel, T. H., Duarte, M. P., et al. Keaomālamalama: Catalysts for transformative change in Hawaiian education. In Elizabeth McKinley and Linda Tuhiwai Smith (Editors-in-Chief) & Graham Hingangaroa Smith and Melinda Webber (Section Editors – Transforming Education) (Eds.), Handbook of Indigenous Education. New Zealand: Springer.
- In Press. Alencastre, M., & Kawaiʻaeʻa., K. Distinctive pathways of preparing Hawaiian language medium-immersion educators. In Paul Whitinui, Carmen Rodriguez de France & Onowa McIvor (Eds.), To be included in a forthcoming issue of Promising Practices in Indigenous Teacher Education. Victoria, BC: Springer Education.
- 2008. Kawaiʻaeʻa, K. Hoʻi hou i ke kumu: Teachers as Nation Builders. In Maenette K.P. Ah Nee- Benham (Ed.), Indigenous Educational Models for Contemporary Practice: In Our Mother's Voice, Volume II. New York, NY: Routledge/Taylor and Francis Group.
- 2007 Kawai‘ae‘a, K., Alencastre, M., & Housman, A. Pū‘ā i ka ‘ōlelo, ola ka ‘ohana: A living case study of three Hawaiian language families over one generation of revitalizing the Hawaiian language. Hūlili: Multidisciplinary Research on Hawaiian Well-being, IV(1), 183–237.
- 2002 Kawai‘ae‘a, K., Ulukau Founder, Ulukau Hawaiian Digital Library, Hale Kuamoʻo.

=== Articles ===
- Galla, C., Kawaiʻaeʻa K., Nicholas S. (2014). "Carrying the torch forward: Indigenous academics building capacity through an international collaborative model". Canadian Journal of Native Education. 37 (1): 193–217.
- Hermes, M. & Kawaiʻaeʻa, K. (2014). "Revitalizing indigenous languages through indigenous immersion education". Journal of Immersion and Content-Based Language Education. 2 (2). John Benjamins Publishing: 303–312.
- Kanaʻiaupuni, S., & Kawaiʻaeʻa, K. E Lauhoe mai nā waʻa (2008). "Toward a Hawaiian Indigenous Education Teaching Framework". Hūlili: Multidisciplinary Research on Hawaiian Well-Being. 5 (1): 67–90.
