= Nightingale (Star Trek: Voyager) =

- Star Trek: Voyager episode
- Episode no.: Season 7 Episode 8
- Directed by: LeVar Burton
- Story by: Robert Lederman; Dave Long
- Teleplay by: André Bormanis
- Production code: 256
- Original air date: November 22, 2000

Guest appearances
- Ron Glass - Loken; Manu Intiraymi - Icheb; Beverly Leech - Dayla; Paul F. O'Brien - Geral; Scott Miles - Terek; Alan Brooks - Annari Commander; Bob Rudd - Brell; Andrei Sterling - Annari Crewmember

Episode chronology
← Previous "Body and Soul"	Next → "Flesh and Blood, Part I"
- Star Trek: Voyager season 7

"Nightingale" is the 154th episode of Star Trek: Voyager, the eighth episode of the seventh season. This science fiction television show tells the story of the USS Voyager, a 24th century Starfleet vessel stranded on the wrong side of the galaxy. Even with their faster-than-light warp drive, it will take several decades to get back.

In this episode, directed by LeVar Burton, the crew are caught in a conflict between two alien factions amidst their search for supplies, as they try to man their spacecraft. Harry Kim is in the spotlight as he takes command of an alien vessel, and Icheb navigates life aboard a starship.

== Plot ==
The Delta Flyer commanded by Harry Kim is caught in the crossfire between Kraylor and Annari ships. The Kraylor claim to be on a humanitarian mission; the Flyer protects the Kraylor vessel and the Annari retreat.

The Kraylor command crew is dead, and Kim assumes command to help complete their vaccine delivery. Kim names the ship Nightingale after the famous wartime nurse. With Seven's help Kim learns to be a better Captain. During an emergency, the ship's doctor Loken is unable to treat injuries but provides instructions for their cloaking device; he reveals they are not doctors carrying vaccines but instead scientists researching cloaking technology to penetrate an Annari blockade. Despite the deception, Kim feels responsible for the crew as Captain. At the Annari blockade, the Nightingale is held by a tractor beam but under Kim's command they break free and reach the planet. Kim and Seven return to Voyager, with Kim accepting that he still has a lot to learn before he can take command.

== Production ==
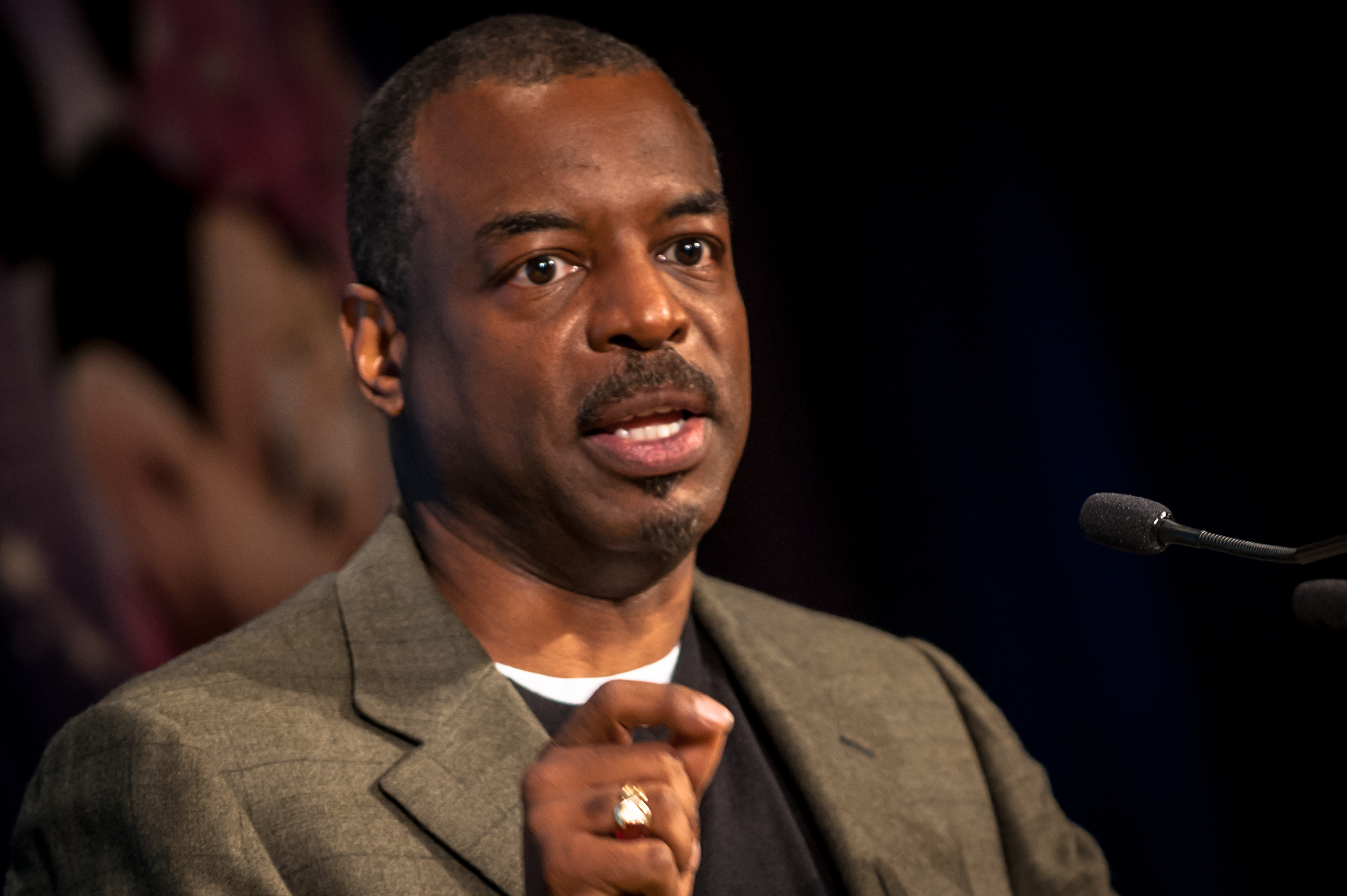
LeVar Burton directed "Nightingale"

Garrett Wang was pleased to be working with LeVar Burton, after being directed by him previously in the episode "Timeless". However, he later said in an interview with Starlog magazine that the script for the episode was originally going to write his character out of the series as he would have remained on the Kraylor vessel and only made a re-appearance in the series finale. Wang said that this would have been a "coup", as the cast get paid whether or not they appear in an episode and so he would have thought of it as a holiday.

The episode's teleplay was written by Andre Bormanis, with a story by Robert Lederman and Dave Long.

This episode was directed by Levar Burton, who directed several other episodes in this television series. Burton played Geordi La Forge, first appearing in the series Star Trek: The Next Generation and reprising that role in the episode "Timeless" which he also directed. Overall Burton would direct 8 episodes of this series.

== Reception ==
This episode was noted for Harry Kim in command of a starship.

Gender and Sexuality in Star Trek by David Greven, highlights Neelix's relationship with Harry Kim as a "midnight snack father confessor" nurturing other crew in his role as morale officer and cook.

== Home media releases ==
On December 21, 2003, this episode was released on DVD as part of a Season 7 boxset; Star Trek Voyager: Complete Seventh Season.
