= Tom Byrd =

American actor

- Born: Thomas Byrd; May 18, 1960 (age 66); Philippine Islands
- Occupation: Actor

Thomas Byrd (born May 18, 1960) is an American actor.

== Career ==
Byrd, who was raised in Florida, has primarily appeared on network television between 1981 and 2000.

Byrd's first television appearance was in 1981 on ABC's situation comedy Laverne & Shirley in the episode entitled "Teenage Lust". His last role was in 2000 as Tim Walsh in two episodes of NBC's Frasier starring Kelsey Grammer. In the interval, he appeared in such series as NBC's Family Ties, The Facts of Life, and Remington Steele and CBS's Newhart and Murder, She Wrote starring Angela Lansbury. Byrd has also done stunts in several films, including Twilight Zone: The Movie (1983), in which he had a small part as a soldier.

During the 1983-1984 season, at the age of twenty-three, he was cast as a teenager, Boone Sawyer, an aspiring Elvis Presley-style singer living in Tennessee during the 1950s, in the short-lived NBC series Boone.

Boone was the replacement program (Mondays at 8 p.m. Eastern) for Michael Landon's Little House on the Prairie, which concluded a nine-year run in the spring of 1983. The program was created by the author Earl Hamner Jr., who had created the long running CBS series The Waltons. A critic described Boone as "an excellent show that didn't get a chance" in the fierce competition of network television: That's Incredible! on ABC and Scarecrow and Mrs. King on CBS.

Barry Corbin played Byrd's father, Merit Sawyer, who considered the pursuit of a musical career to have been unlikely to succeed. Ronnie Claire Edwards played Boone's Aunt Dolly. Other cast members included Elizabeth Huddle, as Boone's mother, William Edward Phipps as Uncle Link Sawyer, the husband of Aunt Dolly, Andrew Prine as A.W. Holly, Julie Anne Haddock as Amanda, Robyn Lively as Banjo, and Amanda Peterson as Squirt Sawyer. While 13 episodes were produced, the series was cancelled after 10 episodes aired in the fall of 1983, with the three remaining episodes burned off in late July and early August 1984.

In 1985, he played Sam Neill's son in the miniseries Kane & Abel, and later played an inmate in Young Guns II (1990). The film, principally starring Emilio Estevez and Kiefer Sutherland, still occasionally airs on the American Movie Classic network.

In 1995, Byrd was cast as Lou Waller, the ex-jock sportscaster with a secret that he fears could ruin his career, in Live Shot, a short-lived drama series from Rysher Entertainment broadcast on the UPN network during its initial season on the air. All UPN programs at the time were soon cancelled except for Star Trek: Voyager.

== Filmography ==
Film and television
| Year | Title | Role | Notes |
|---|---|---|---|
| 1981 | Laverne & Shirley | Mike | Episode: "Young at Heart" |
| 1982 | Quincy, M.E. | Perry Jordan | Episode: "Bitter Pill" |
| 1982 | Young Doctors in Love | New Intern | Feature film |
| 1982 | The Powers of Matthew Star | Tom | Episode: "The Accused" |
| 1982 | Gimme a Break! | Dave | Episode: "Sam's Imaginary Friend" |
| 1982 | The Facts of Life | Leo | Episode: "Different Drummer" |
| 1983 | Fantasy Island | Ethan | Episode: "The Devil Stick/Touch and Go" |
| 1983 | Alice | Rudy | Episode: "Tommy, the Jailbird" |
| 1983 | Twilight Zone: The Movie | G.I. | Feature film (Segment #1: "Time Out") |
| 1983–84 | Boone | Boone Sawyer | Main cast (13 episodes) |
| 1983 | Death Ride to Osaka | Don Potter | Television film (aka Girls of the White Orchid) |
| 1984 | Family Ties | Rick Harmon | Episode: "Ready or Not" |
| 1984 | St. Elsewhere | Kevin Hooper | Episode: "Equinox" |
| 1984 | Love Thy Neighbor | Wayne Nelson | Television film |
| 1984 | All Together Now | Kip Parker | Television sitcom pilot |
| 1984 | Wet Gold | Chris Barnes | Television film |
| 1984 | Remington Steele | Chip Flowers | Episode: "Breath of Steele" |
| 1985 | The Facts of Life | Nick | Episode: "With a Little Help from My Friends" |
| 1985 | Malice in Wonderland | William Hopper | Television film |
| 1985 | Kane & Abel | Richard Kane | Television miniseries |
| 1986 | Newhart | Robert Cameron | Episode: "Desperately Desiring Susan: Part 2" |
| 1987 | Ohara | Danny Johnson | Episode: "The Sparrow" |
| 1988 | Murder, She Wrote | Paul Gambini | Episode: "A Very Good Year for Murder" |
| 1989 | Out Cold | Mr. Holstrom | Feature film |
| 1989 | Nightingales | Dr. Thomas Price | Episodes: #1.4 / #1.9 |
| 1989 | Guts and Glory: The Rise and Fall of Oliver North | Robert Owen | Television film |
| 1990 | Alien Nation | Bud Anderson | Episode: "Partners" |
| 1990 | Sydney | Rick | Episode: "You? You're a Private Eye?" |
| 1990 | Young Guns II: Blaze of Glory | Pit Inmate | Feature film |
| 1991 | True Colors | Donald Jenkins | Episode: "A Real Pain" |
| 1994 | One West Waikiki | Frank Walker | Episode: "Terminal Island" |
| 1995 | Live Shot | Lou Waller | Main cast (14 episodes) |
| 1997 | Unhappily Ever After | Professor Alfred | Episode: "College!" |
| 2000 | Frasier | Tim Walsh | "Something Borrowed, Someone Blue" (Parts 1 & 2) |
