= Rhythm & Blues (TV series) =

American sitcom

- Genre: Sitcom
- Created by: Jordan Moffet
- Starring: Roger Kabler; Vanessa Bell Calloway; Miguel A. Nunez, Jr.; Troy Curvey Jr.; Billy "Sly" Williams; Christopher Babers; Ron Glass; Anna Maria Horsford
- Country of origin: United States
- Original language: English
- No. of seasons: 1
- No. of episodes: 13 (7 unaired)

Production
- Executive producer: Jordan Moffet
- Camera setup: Multi-camera
- Production companies: Mixed Emotions, Inc.; 20th Century Fox Television

Original release
- Network: NBC
- Release: September 24, 1992 – February 12, 1993

Rhythm & Blues is an American sitcom television series, created by Jordan Moffet, that aired on NBC for five weeks from September 24 to October 22, 1992, with an additional leftover episode airing on February 12, 1993. The show stars Roger Kabler, Anna Maria Horsford, Ron Glass, Troy Curvey Jr., Vanessa Bell Calloway, Miguel A. Nunez, Jr., and Christopher Babers.

== Premise ==
Rhythm & Blues stars Roger Kabler as Bobby Soul, a white man who gets hired on a black radio station after being initially mistaken to be a black man.

== Cast ==
- Roger Kabler as Bobby Soul
- Vanessa Bell Calloway as Colette Hawkins
- Troy Curvey Jr. as The Love Man
- Billy "Sly" Williams as Jammin'
- Christopher Babers as Earl "Ziggy" Washington
- Ron Glass as Don Phillips
- Anna Maria Horsford as Veronica Washington
- Miguel A. Núñez Jr. as Jammin

== Episodes ==
No.	Title	Directed by	Written by	Original release date	Prod. code	Viewers (millions)
1	"Pilot"	Art Wolff	Jordan Moffet	September 24, 1992	9R79	17.2
2	"And the Banned Played On"	Art Wolff	Michael Carrington & Gary Apple	October 1, 1992	9R02	12.4
3	"The Same Old Song"	Art Wolff	Rick Copp & David A. Goodman	October 8, 1992	9R03	12.7
4	"Mrs. Washington's Neighborhood"	Art Wolff	Mark Reisman & Jeremy Stevens	October 15, 1992	9R04	13.1
5	"They Shoot DJ's, Don't They?"	Art Wolff	Jordan Moffet	October 22, 1992	9R01	11.4
6	"Assault on Station BLZ"	Tony Singletary	Rick Copp & David A. Goodman	February 12, 1993	9R10	5.7
7	"Your Sister Wears Combat Boots"	Art Wolff	Marcia L. Leslie	Unaired	9R05	N/A
8	"I'll Be Seeing You"	N/A	Frank Dungan & Michael S. Baser	Unaired	9R06	N/A
9	"Radio Wars: Part 1"	John Sgueglia	Mark Reisman & Jeremy Stevens	Unaired	9R07	N/A
10	"Radio Wars: Part 2"	John Sgueglia	Mark Reisman & Jeremy Stevens	Unaired	9R08	N/A
11	"The Stakeout"	Linda Day	Nat Mauldin	Unaired	9R09	N/A
12	"The DJ, His Date, Her Boss and His Son"	John Sgueglia	John Ridley	Unaired	9R11	N/A
13	"The BLZ Gang"	John Sgueglia	Frank Dungan & Michael S. Baser	Unaired	9R12	N/A

== Reception ==
Despite being listed among NBC's Must See TV Thursday night lineup after A Different World at 8:00 and before Cheers at 9:00, the show was cancelled after only five weeks due to low ratings. The show was heavily criticized for relying on traditional black stereotypes for its humor. TV Guide said that: "What makes a show built on white jokes any better than a show built on black jokes?"
