= Big Island Film Festival =

Hawaiian film festival (2006-2016)

The Big Island Film Festival was a film festival in Hawaii held every May from 2006 through 2016. It showed short and feature-length independent films. It was founded by Leo Sears, who was inspired by the success of the Maui Film Festival. In 2009, MovieMaker named it one of the "25 Coolest Film Festivals". The festival was not held after 2016.

== History ==
The Big Island Film Festival was founded by Leo Sears, a resident of Waikoloa Village who was inspired after attending the Maui Film Festival. He first organized a short film festival as a fundraiser for charity, which occurred in 2005. The first Big Island Film Festival took place from May 18–21, 2006. In 2009, the festival was named one of the "25 Coolest Film Festivals" by MovieMaker.

In 2010 the event moved from the Waikoloa Beach Resort to the Mauna Lani Resort in order to accommodate its increasing size. The 2012 festival hosted nearly 2,000 attendees and, in 2014, up to 2,400 people attended. The 2016 festival was attended by more than 3,000 people, more than Sear's initial prediction of 2,750. The following year, Sears' wife Janice, who was a co-producer of the festival with him, died. The festival did not return past 2016.

== Format ==
Every film accepted to the Big Island Film Festival was publicly screened, with Sears saying that public access was the only way to "maintain the integrity of the event." In 2009, Sears claimed that 17% of all films at the festival secured a distributor.

The festival included a portion that raised money for veteran's charities.

== Golden Honu Awards ==
The festival's awards were named the "Golden Honu Awards." Award recipients for best film throughout the festival's history included:

- 2011: Queen of the Lot
- 2013: Strange Frame
- 2014: The Haumana and Time Lapse
- 2015: Wildlike
- 2016: The Closer
