= College of Hawaiian Language =

Colleges at the University of Hawaii at Hilo

Coordinates: 19.7000537°N 155.0875377°W

Ka Haka ʻUla O Keʻelikōlani (KHUOK) College of Hawaiian Language is one of nine colleges and programs at the University of Hawaii at Hilo. KHUOK offers BA, MA and PhD programs in Hawaiian language and related topics including linguistics, literature, language acquisition, and indigenous cultural revitalization.

KHUOK was founded in 1997 and was named after Ruth Keʻelikōlani. Its motto is Language is the fiber that binds us to our cultural identity (in Hawaiian: ʻO ka ʻŌlelo ke Kaʻā o ka Mauli).

== Academic programs ==
The academic programs at KHUOK include degrees at the BA, MA, and PhD levels.

=== Bachelor of Arts ===
The BA in Hawaiian Studies at KHUOK offers two specializations: Continuing the Culture and Monitoring the Culture.

=== Master of Arts ===
The MA in Hawaiian Language and Literature prepares scholars to carry out research on Hawaiian literary resources from the 19th and 20th century.

=== PhD ===
The PhD in Hawaiian and Indigenous Language and Culture Revitalization trains students to take leadership positions in language revitalization programs in Indigenous communities around the world.

== Facilities ==
KHUOK is housed in Haleʻōlelo, a $21 million facility in the campus of UH Hilo, designed by WCIT Architects in Honolulu. Haleʻōlelo opened in spring of 2014.

== Notable faculty ==
Notable faculty include

- Keiki Kawaiʻaeʻa, Director
- Glenn Kalena Silva, Professor
- William Pila Wilson, Professor
- Kauanoe Kamanā, Associate Professor
- Larry Kimura, Associate Professor
