= Pūnana Leo =

Hawaiian-language preschools

Pūnana Leo (lit. 'voice nest'; often translated as "language nest") are private, non-profit preschools run by families, in which the Hawaiian language is the language of instruction and administration.

Initially opened illegally, the first Pūnana Leo opened in 1984 in Kekaha, Kauaʻi. Based on the practices of 19th-century Hawaiian-language schools, as well as kōhanga reo kindergartens for the Māori language in New Zealand, the Pūnana Leo was the first indigenous language immersion preschool project in the United States. Graduates from the Pūnana Leo schools have achieved several measures of academic success in later life.

As of 2022, there were a total of 11 Pūnana Leo preschools, with locations on five of the Hawaiian Islands.

== History ==
The organization ʻAha Pūnana Leo was founded in 1983 by a group of Hawaiian language educators including Larry Kimura, Kauanoe Kamanā, and William H. "Pila" Wilson.

Establishment of the schools involved a long political struggle, including boycotts of the public schools. Using the Hawaiian language as a medium of education was outlawed in 1896, and legal constraints against its use were maintained by territorial and U.S. state governments until 1986. A renaissance of Hawaiian culture and politics in the 1970s brought a new focus to the topic of the revitalization of the Hawaiian language. Among its many consequences was the reestablishment of Hawaiian as an official language by a state constitutional convention in 1978, as part of a recognition of the cultural and linguistic rights of the people of Hawaii.

Despite the revitalization of the Hawaiian language, many legal barriers remained in force as a legacy of past policies. In particular, public school education using Hawaiian as the language of instruction was banned by a law requiring the use of English as the medium of instruction through grade eight. The law more relevant to the private Pūnana Leo was one which effectively banned the last remaining native speakers of Hawaiian from being teachers because they lacked, and were very unlikely ever to obtain, the proper credentials. The initial removal of these legal barriers required three years of lobbying by families supporting the Pūnana Leo schools. Opponents to the lobbying effort, including in particular the existing the preschool establishment, cited the potential harm to a child’s development that being educated by untrained individuals might cause. After laws were revised, the public school system was slow to provide Hawaiian-language instruction across all age levels of students, so parents in different communities began to boycott the public schools at each stage as their children advanced from preschool to kindergarten to elementary school to middle school, in a progression from, in the words of William H. Wilson, a professor in the Hawaiian language, "an initially illegal preschool to a boycott kindergarten, a state elementary school, [and] a boycott intermediate school".

Eventually, these efforts led to the establishment of immersion streams or tracks, known as "schools-within-schools," within existing school facilities. Today the Pūnana Leo preschools form the core of the ‘Aha Pūnana Leo, (Note: lit. '"Language nest corporation" or "Language nest gathering"'.) the organization which has provided the impetus for the reestablishment of a Hawaiian-language educational system which also includes K–12 immersion schools and doctoral-level programs in the language. The ‘Aha Pūnana Leo produces curriculum and teacher training for its preschools. The first-ever class of Pūnana Leo students graduated from high school in 1999, and in 2002 the Hilo campus of the University of Hawaii awarded the first master's degree completed entirely in the Hawaiian language. As of 2023, there were a total of thirteen Pūnana Leo preschools, with locations on five of the Hawaiian islands: Hawaiʻi, Maui, Molokaʻi, Oʻahu and Kauaʻi.

== Goals ==
The schools' goals include revitalization of the indigenous Hawaiian language, fostering Hawaiian identity, and "other central features of a person's life and the life of a people". Their community-based, Hawaiian educational philosophy – Ke Kumu Honua Mauli Ola – includes the use of parental labor through in-kind service, and requires that parents attended language classes and administer the schools through a parent committee. This philosophy was based on the practices of 19th-century Hawaiian-medium schools, as well as the Māori language revival kindergartens (kōhanga reo) in New Zealand. The curriculum includes Hawaiian cultural practices such as gardening native plants and the foliage for lei; visiting historically significant sites; and the culturally-important practice of hoʻokipa (hospitality). Although classes are conducted in Hawaiian, they are functionally different from foreign-language immersion schools.

Although early opponents suggested the Pūnana Leo schools would harm students' academic development, graduates from the schools have achieved several measures of academic success in later life. This is true despite the fact that the emphasis of the schools is on language revitalization rather than academic achievement. Teresa L. McCarty, scholar in indigenous language education, said, "Immersion students have garnered prestigious scholarships, enrolled in college courses while still in high school, and passed the state university's English composition assessments, despite receiving the majority of their English, science and mathematics instruction in Hawaiian. Student achievement on standardised tests has equalled... [or] surpassed that of Native Hawaiian children enrolled in English language schools, even in English language arts." These academic benefits come in addition to language revitalization and an increased realization of cultural pride.

== See also ==
- Language revitalization
- Linguistic rights
- Hawaiian language
- University of Hawaiʻi at Hilo
- Calandretas, ikastolas, and Diwans, similar immersion schools for Occitan, Basque, and Breton learners, respectively.
