= Larry Kimura =

Hawaiian language expert

Larry Lindsey Kimura (born June 29, 1946) is a Hawaiian linguist. He is a professor of the Hawaiian language and Hawaiian studies at the University of Hawaiʻi at Hilo in the Ka Haka ʻUla O Keʻelikōlani, College of Hawaiian Language.

== Biography ==
Larry was born in Waimea, Hawaii County, Hawaii, U.S.A., between his issei father Hisao Kimura, who had immigrated from Hiroshima, Japan, and his Hawaiian mother, Elizabeth Lindsey, who had been brought up in a predominantly Hawaiian-speaking family.

Kimura has been an advocate for the revival of the once-prestigious Hawaiian language from its near-endangered state, he was a co-founder of ʻAha Pūnana Leo.

=== Naming of space entities ===
Astronomers consulted with Kimura to create Hawaiian names for notable stellar objects discovered or imaged from Hawaii.

He was part of the committee who named the first interstellar asteroid observed in the solar system, ʻOumuamua, alongside his niece, Ka'iu Kimura.

==== Pōwehi (M87*) ====
In April 2019, astronomers operating the James Clerk Maxwell Telescope and Canada–France–Hawaii Telescope (part of the Event Horizon Telescope array), such as Doug Simons, approached Kimura to give a Hawaiian name to the recently imaged black hole M87* in the galaxy Messier 87, in recognition of the fact that the telescope was on Mauna Kea. Kimura came up with the name "Pōwehi", from pō 'darkness' or 'night' and wehi 'darkness' or 'adornment' to suggest "the adorned fathomless dark creation" or "embellished dark source of unending creation", found in the intensified form pōwehiwehi in the Kumulipo, a Hawaiian creation chant recorded in the 18th century. (Pōwehiwehi means 'darkness streaked with glimmers of light', a generating agent of a stage in the development of life on earth as it advances toward the light, from pō 'darkness' and wehiwehi 'dappled shade'.) The governor of Hawaii declared 10 April 2019 to be "Pōwehi Day". Unlike ʻOumuamua, however, the name Pōwehi has not been submitted to the IAU, as the IAU has no provision for accepting names for galaxies or black holes.

== See also ==
- Language revival
- Linguistic rights
