= Ron Glass =

American actor (1945–2016)

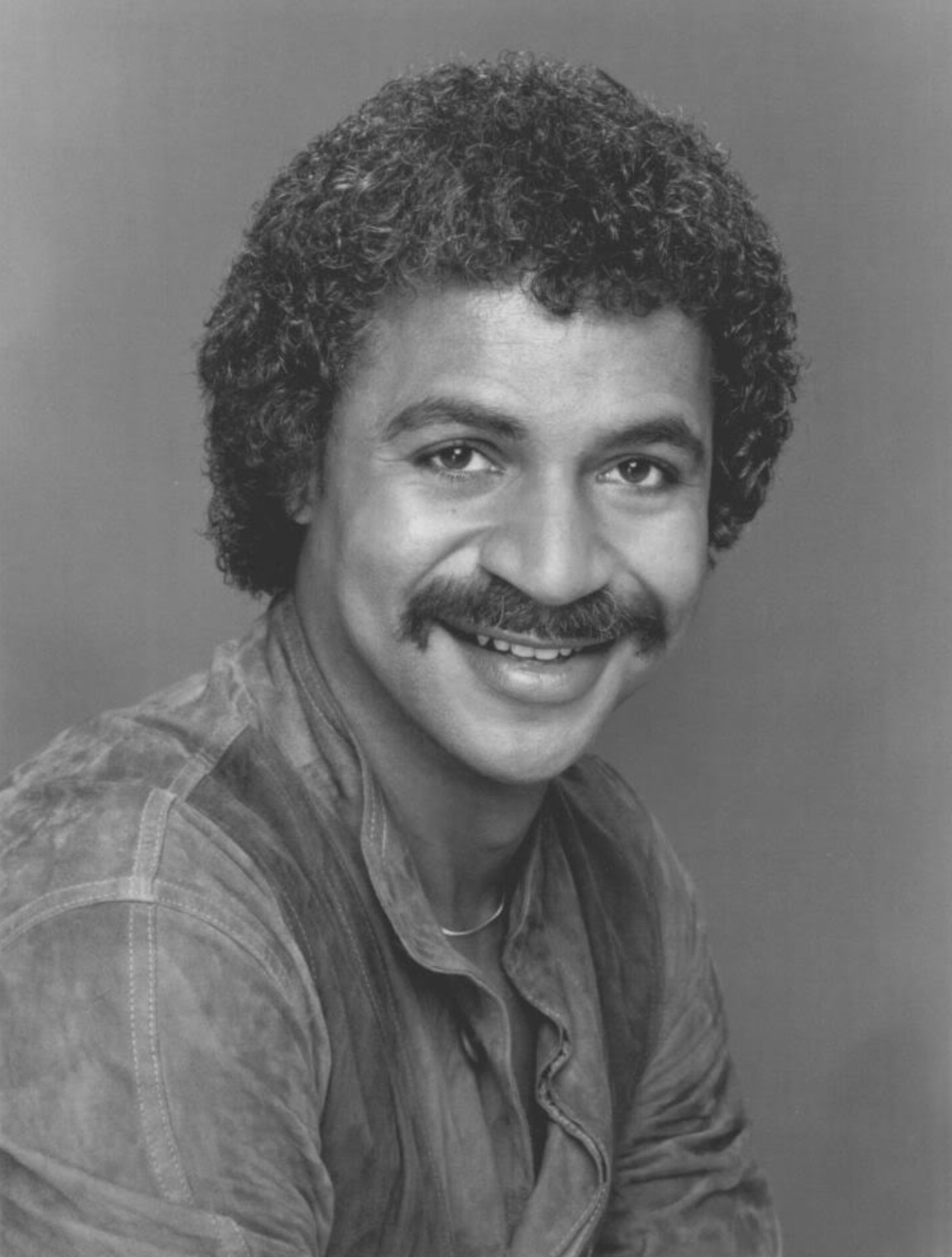
- Glass in 1982
- Born: Ronald Earle Glass; July 10, 1945; Evansville, Indiana, U.S.
- Died: November 25, 2016 (aged 71); Los Angeles, California, U.S.
- Resting place: Rose Hills Memorial Park
- Education: University of Evansville (BA)
- Occupation: Actor
- Years active: 1972–2014
- Known for: Detective Ron Harris (Barney Miller); Shepherd Book (Firefly and Serenity)

Ronald Earle Glass (July 10, 1945 – November 25, 2016) was an American actor. He was known for his roles as literary Detective Ron Harris in the television sitcom Barney Miller (1975–1982), for which he received a Primetime Emmy Award nomination, and as the Shepherd Book, in the science fiction series Firefly (2002) and its sequel film Serenity (2005).

== Early life ==
Glass was born in Evansville, Indiana, the son of Lethia and Crump Glass.

After graduating from St. Francis Seminary in 1964, Glass attended the University of Evansville, where he received a Bachelor of Arts, double majoring in drama and literature. Years later, the university awarded him its Medal of Honor. Glass said in 2007 he knew while he was in college that he wanted to act. With the encouragement of his teacher, Dudley Thomas, he performed in a play and went on to an acting career.

== Career ==
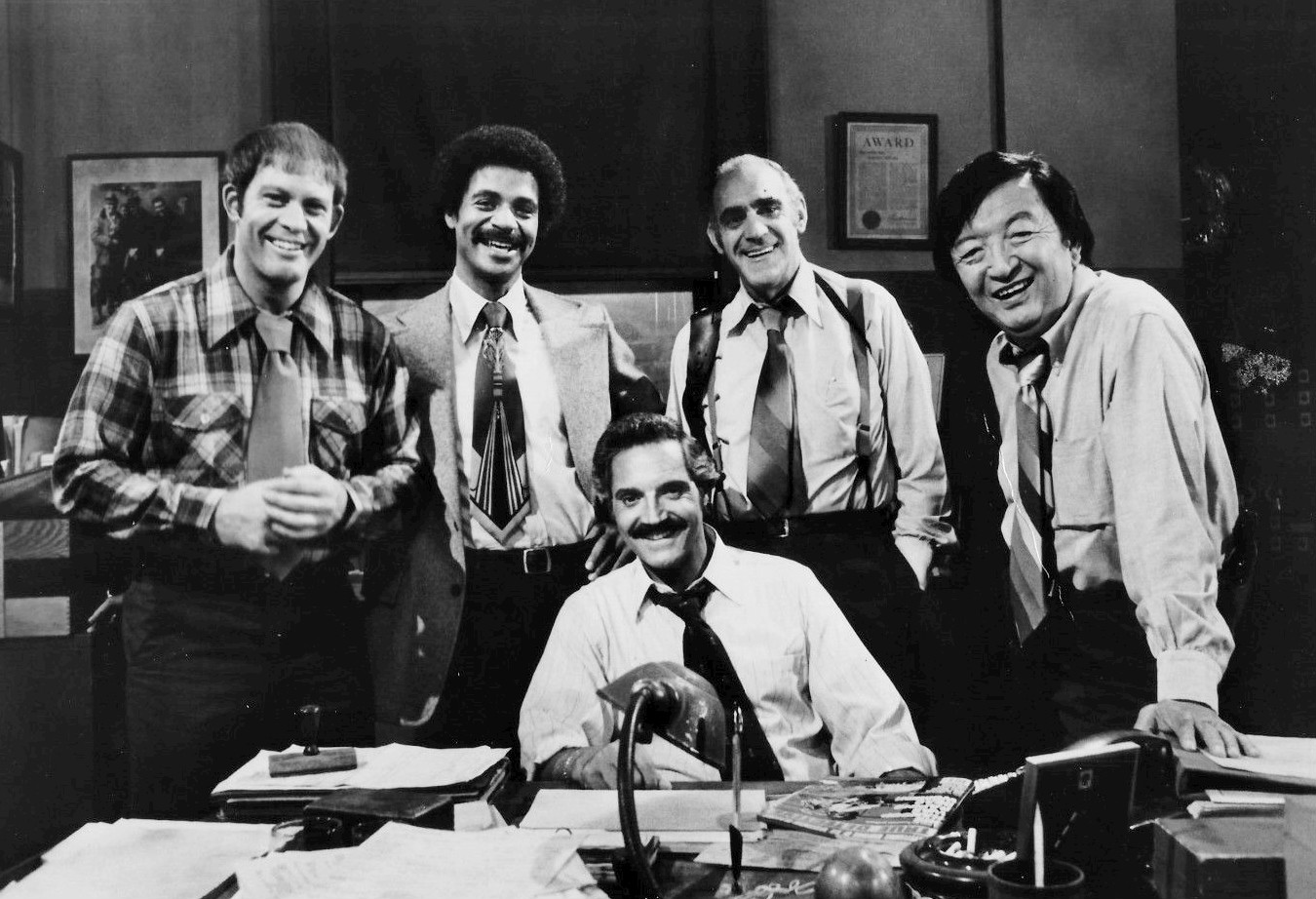
Glass (second from the left) with the cast of Barney Miller, 1977

Glass made his stage debut at the Guthrie Theater in Minneapolis, before moving to Hollywood. His earliest TV appearances include episodes of Sanford and Son in 1972, an episode of Hawaii Five-O in 1973, an episode of Maude in 1973, an episode of All in the Family in 1973, an episode of The Bob Newhart Show, and episodes of Good Times in 1974. In 1975, he landed the role of Detective Ron Harris in Barney Miller, which ran until 1982.

The following season, Glass co-starred with Demond Wilson on television in a remake of The Odd Couple, called The New Odd Couple. On December 13, 1985, he played a soul-collecting devil opposite Sherman Hemsley's mathematics professor in an episode of the revived Twilight Zone series. In 1992, he co-starred in the sitcom Rhythm and Blues.

In 1996, Glass was cast as uptight history teacher Roland Felcher in the NBC sitcom Mr. Rhodes opposite Tom Rhodes. In 1999, he appeared in two episodes of the NBC sitcom Friends as Russell, Ross Geller's lawyer. After that, Glass appeared in dozens of television series, including sitcoms such as Family Matters and the series Teen Angel, where he played God's cousin Rod. He had a guest appearance in the Star Trek: Voyager episode "Nightingale". He was a series regular in the science fiction series Firefly (2002) and the sequel film Serenity (2005), in which he played Derrial Book, a Christian Shepherd (Latin: Pastor) with a mysterious past. Glass provided the voice of Randy Carmichael for the Nickelodeon series All Grown Up! and Rugrats, and the character Garth in the video game Fable II. In 2008 he appeared in the film Lakeview Terrace alongside Samuel L. Jackson and starred in the 2010 version of Death at a Funeral as Duncan.

== Personal life and death ==
Glass never married, and though raised Catholic became a devout Buddhist, and a member of Soka Gakkai International. He died of respiratory failure on November 25, 2016, at the age of 71. He is interred at the Rose Hills Memorial Park in Whittier, California.

== Filmography ==
=== Film ===
Ron Glass film credits
Year	Title	Role	Notes	Ref.
1974	The Crazy World of Julius Vrooder	Quintus		
1983	Sound of Sunshine – Sound of Rain	Narrator	Short film	
1988	Deep Space	Jerry Merris		
1995	Houseguest	Dr. Derek Bond		
1996	It's My Party	Dr. David Wahl		
1997	Back in Business	Allen Smith		
1999	Unbowed	President Duquesne		
1999	Deal of a Lifetime	Mr. Creighton		
2001	Recess: School's Out	Dr. Lazenby / Tech #2 (voice)	Direct-to-video	
2005	Serenity	Shepherd Book		
2008	Lakeview Terrace	Harold Perreau		
2010	Death at a Funeral	Duncan		
2012	Strange Frame	Philo Grenman		

=== Television ===
Ron Glass television credits
Year	Title	Role	Notes	Ref.
1972–1974	Sanford and Son	Hucklebuck / Herman Edwards	2 episodes	
1973	All in the Family	Jack	Episode: "Everybody Tells the Truth"	
1973	Beg, Borrow, or Steal	Ray Buren	TV film	
1973	Shirts/Skins	Mr. Brown	TV film	
1973	Maude	Whitnauer Fulton	Episode: "Florida's Affair"	
1973	Hawaii Five-O	J. Paul	Episode: "Tricks Are Not Treats"	
1973	The Bob Newhart Show	Elevator Repairman	Episode: "Fit, Fat and Forty One"	
1973	Griff	Dietrich	Episode: "Elephant in a Cage"	
1973	Insight	Courtney Rickell	Episode: "Reunion"	
1974	The New Adventures of Perry Mason	Mark Borden	Episode: "The Case of the Tortured Titan"	
1974	Change at 125th Street	John Morse	TV short film	
1974	Good Times	Mr. Pearson / Henry Anderson	2 episodes	
1974	The Streets of San Francisco	Earl	Episode: "Rampage"	
1975	Let's Switch!	LaRue Williams	TV film	
1975	Insight	Courtney Rickell	Episode: "Class Reunion"	
1975	Foster and Laurie	Doctor #2	TV film	
1975	When Things Were Rotten	Black Knight	Episode: "This Lance for Hire"	
1975–1982	Barney Miller	Det. Ron Harris	Regular role (164 episodes)	
1976	The Streets of San Francisco	Arlen Washington	Episode: "The Thrill Killers"	
1978	Crash	Jerry Grant	TV film	
1981	Hart to Hart	Conductor Slattery	Episode: "Hartland Express"	
1982–1983	The New Odd Couple	Felix Unger	Regular role (18 episodes)	
1985	Gus Brown and Midnight Brewster	Midnight Brewster	TV film	
1985	The Twilight Zone	Demon	Episode: "I of Newton"	
1986	Perry Mason: The Case of the Shooting Star	Eric Brenner	TV film	
1987	227	Robert Stone	2 episodes	
1988	Sonny Spoon	Unknown	Episode: "Deuces Wild"	
1989	Family Matters	Buddy Goodrich	Episode: "False Arrest"	
1989–1991	Amen	Jason Lockwood	3 episodes	
1991	The New Adam-12	Logan Mills	Episode: "D.A.R.E."	
1992	Murder, She Wrote	Lt. Hanrahan	Episode: "Incident in Lot #7"	
1992	The Royal Family	Deacon Hudson	Episode: "The Sneakin' Deacon"	
1992–1993	Rhythm & Blues	Don Phillips	Main role (13 episodes)	
1993	Designing Women	Punch	Episode: "It's Not So Easy Being Green"	
1993–2001	Rugrats	Randy Carmichael (voice)	6 episodes	
1994	Aladdin	Kwanseer (voice)	Episode: "Bad Mood Rising"	
1996–1997	Mr. Rhodes	Ronald Felcher	Regular role (17 episodes)	
1997	Superman: The Animated Series	News Anchorman (voice)	Episode: "Blasts from the Past"	
1997	The Practice	Judge Kent	Episode: "Reasonable Doubts"	
1997–1998	Teen Angel	Rod	Regular role (17 episodes)	
1999	Incognito	Marcus Courtland	TV film	
1999	Twice in a Lifetime	Charlie Summers / Charlie Winters	Episode: "The Blame Game"	
1999	Friends	Russell	2 episodes	
2000	Jack & Jill	Mr. Small	Episode: "Animal Planet: Part 1"	
2000	Zoe, Duncan, Jack and Jane	Prof. Bradford	Episode: "Too Much Pressure"	
2000	Star Trek: Voyager	Loken	Episode: "Nightingale"	
2001	Rude Awakening	Joseph	Episode: "Ode to Billie and Joe"	
2001	Yes, Dear	Dr. Bradley	Episode: "The Big Snip"	
2001	The Education of Max Bickford	Graham Redmond	Episode: "Pilot"	
2001	The Proud Family	The Talking Baby (voice)	4 episodes	
2002	Firefly	Shepherd Derrial Book	Main role (14 episodes)	
2004	The Division	Barry	Episode: "Hail, Hail, the Gang's All Here"	
2004–2008	All Grown Up!	Randy Carmichael (voice)	12 episodes	
2006	Secret History of Religion: Doomsday – Book of Revelation	Reenactor	TV film	
2006	Secret History of Religion: Knights Templar	Reenactor	TV film	
2006–2007	Shark	Judge Stewart Fenton	3 episodes	
2008	Dirty Sexy Money	D.A. Dennis Ford	2 episodes	
2011	CSI: NY	Colby Glass	Episode: "To What End?"	
2013, 2014	Agents of S.H.I.E.L.D.	Dr. Streiten	2 episodes	
2013	Major Crimes	Clayton Carter	Episode: "There's No Place Like Home"	
2014	CSI: Crime Scene Investigation	Paul Lomax	Episode: "Killer Moves" (Final role)	

=== Video games ===
Ron Glass video game credits
Year	Title	Role	Notes	Ref.
2008	Fable II	Garth		
2014	Ancient Space	Colonel Edwards / Professor Risseau	Voice (final role)	
