= Honomū, Hawaii =

Census-designated place in Hawaii, U.S.

Honomū
- Census-designated place
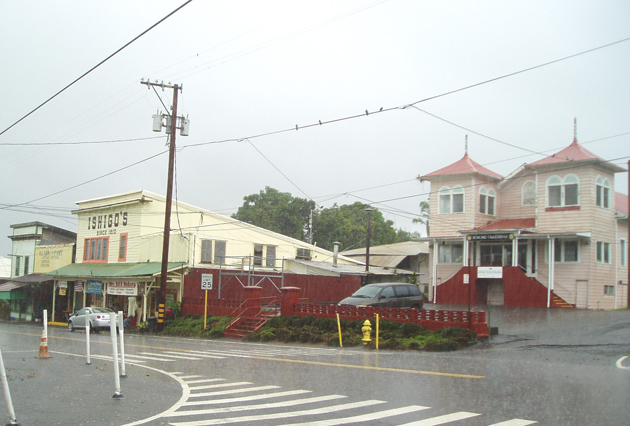
- Honomu during rainstorm, 2008. The building to the right is the Köyasan Shingon Mission

- Location in Hawaiʻi County and the state of Hawaiʻi
- Coordinates: 19°52′12″N 155°6′50″W
- Country: United States
- State: Hawaiʻi
- County: Hawaiʻi

Area
  - Total: 0.49 sq mi (1.26 km^{2})
  - Land: 0.46 sq mi (1.18 km^{2})
  - Water: 0.027 sq mi (0.07 km^{2})
- Elevation: 300 ft (91 m)

Population (2020)
  - Total: 452
  - Density: 989.9/sq mi (382.21/km^{2})
- Time zone: UTC-10 (Hawaii–Aleutian)
- ZIP code: 96728
- Area code: 808
- FIPS code: 15-17450
- GNIS feature ID: 0359354

Honomū (Hawaiian for 'silent bay') is a census-designated place (CDP) in Hawaii County, Hawaii, United States. The population was 509 at the 2010 census, down from 541 at the 2000 census.

== Geography ==
Honomū is located on the northeast side of the island of Hawaii at 19°52′17″N 155°07′01″W. Hawaii Route 19 passes through the community, leading northwest 31 miles (50 km) to Honokaa and south 11 miles (18 km) to Hilo. Hawaii Route 220 leads southwest from Route 19 through the center of Honomu 3.8 miles (6.1 km) to its terminus at Akaka Falls State Park.

According to the United States Census Bureau, the CDP has a total area of 0.50 square miles (1.3 km^{2}), of which 0.03 square miles (0.07 km^{2}), or 5.83%, are water.

== Demographics ==
Historical population
Census	Pop.	Note	%±
2020	452		—
U.S. Decennial Census

=== 2000 Census data ===
As of the census of 2000, there were 541 people, 193 households, and 143 families residing in the CDP. The population density was 1,172.8 inhabitants per square mile (452.8/km^{2}). There were 213 housing units at an average density of 461.7 per square mile (178.3/km^{2}). The racial makeup of the CDP was 23.29% White, 0.74% Native American, 29.94% Asian, 5.18% Pacific Islander, 2.03% from other races, and 38.82% from two or more races. Hispanic or Latino of any race were 12.20% of the population.

There were 193 households, out of which 26.9% had children under the age of 18 living with them, 50.3% were married couples living together, 16.6% had a female householder with no husband present, and 25.9% were non-families. 19.7% of all households were made up of individuals, and 9.3% had someone living alone who was 65 years of age or older. The average household size was 2.80 and the average family size was 3.19.

In the CDP the population was spread out, with 24.0% under the age of 18, 5.9% from 18 to 24, 25.0% from 25 to 44, 24.2% from 45 to 64, and 20.9% who were 65 years of age or older. The median age was 42 years. For every 100 females, there were 89.8 males. For every 100 females age 18 and over, there were 91.2 males.

The median income for a household in the CDP was $30,179, and the median income for a family was $35,536. Males had a median income of $28,438 versus $19,167 for females. The per capita income for the CDP was $15,190. About 11.9% of families and 16.6% of the population were below the poverty line, including 27.6% of those under age 18 and 0.9% of those age 65 or over.

== Places of worship ==
The Köyasan Shingon Mission of Hawaii is based in Honomu.

== See also ==
- List of places in Hawaiʻi
