= Flesh and Blood (Star Trek: Voyager) =

- Star Trek: Voyager episodes
- Episode nos.: Season 7 Episodes 9 & 10
- Directed by: Mike Vejar (part I); David Livingston (part II)
- Story by: Jack Monaco (part I); Bryan Fuller (parts I & II); Raf Green (parts I & II)
- Teleplay by: Brian Fuller (part I); Raf Green (part II); Kenneth Biller (part II)
- Production codes: 253 & 254
- Original air date: November 29, 2000

Guest appearances
- Jeff Yagher - Iden; Ryan Bollman - Donik; Michael Wiseman - Beta Hirogen; Cindy Katz - Kejal; Spencer Garrett - Weiss; Vaughn Armstrong - Alpha Hirogen; Paul Eckstein - New Alpha Hirogen; David Doty - Nuu'Bari Miner; Todd Jeffries - Hirogen One; Chad Halyard - Hirogen Two; Don McMillan - Hirogen Three; Damon Kirsche - Nuu'Bari Hologram One

Episode chronology
← Previous "Nightingale"	Next → "Shattered"
- Star Trek: Voyager season 7

"Flesh and Blood" is a two-part episode from the seventh season of the science fiction television series Star Trek: Voyager. The crew of USS Voyager must contend with violent Delta Quadrant aliens—the Hirogen—who use the holodeck technology with a horrific amoral twist.

== Overview ==
The episode originally aired on UPN on November 29, 2000; it was played later in two separate approximately 45 minute installments.

This episode is a follow on from the events of "The Killing Game".

== Plot ==
The USS Voyager discovers a Hirogen ship that has been turned into a large holodeck. All but one of the crew are dead; the survivor, an engineer named Donik, reveals the holograms found a way to disable security controls and kill the crew. Voyager is soon met by another Hirogen ship also responding to the distress call. The two ships are led into a trap set by the holograms, leaving Voyager helpless to stop the holograms from abducting Voyager's holographic Doctor.

Aboard the holo-ship, the Doctor finds the holograms to be those of other Alpha Quadrant races. Their leader, the Bajoran Iden, asks the Doctor to help tend to their wounded, which surprises the Doctor as holograms cannot be harmed. He finds that the Hirogen modifications cause the holograms to experience pain and death many times over as to make their training more realistic.

The Doctor explains Iden's case to Captain Janeway. The two get into a heated debate over holographic rights just as the Hirogen make contact with their homeworld and engage in combat with the security teams in the Mess Hall. Iden detects two Hirogen vessels approaching and fires on Voyager. Iden abducts Torres onto his ship before they take off into warp.

On the holo-ship, the Doctor explains the holograms' plight to Torres. Iden identifies a nearby Y-class planet where they will set up their society. En route to the planet, they come upon a Nuu'bari mining vessel that uses photonic beings for manual labor. The Doctor and Torres find other holograms have become wary of Iden's intentions.

Voyager arrives and prepares to fire on the holo-ship. Iden transports several of the Hirogen from their ships to the surface, where they are hunted by the holograms. The Nuu'Bari holograms are activated, but do not understand. Torres explains that their programs are not complex enough.

The Doctor finds Iden before he can execute the Hirogen leader and tries to convince him to stop. Iden refuses to listen and, as he proceeds to land a lethal blow, the Doctor fires his weapon, fully disrupting Iden's program.

The surviving Hirogen are treated and returned to their ships. On Voyager, the Doctor accepts his responsibility for disobeying orders and working with the holograms.

== Reception ==
Jamahl Epsicokhan in Jammer's Reviews assigns this episode 3.5 out of 4 stars and calls Flesh and Blood: "a well-crafted Voyager outing. As an "epic two-hour telefilm!" it's by far the best of the series' three (excluding the pilot), the other two being the dumb and bloated "The Killing Game" and the entertaining but relatively thin "Dark Frontier."'

In 2019, CBR ranked this the 19th best holodeck-themed episode of all Star Trek franchise episodes up to that time.

In 2016, SyFy Wire ranked this the sixth best episode Bryan Fuller wrote for, and felt it was a brilliant idea but not perfect. That same year, Den of Geek ranked the episodes the 15 (Part I) and 16th (Part II) as the best Bryan Fuller episodes.

== Home media ==
On December 21, 2003, this episode was released on DVD as part of a Season 7 boxset; Star Trek Voyager: Complete Seventh Season.

== See also ==
- AI agent
- AI takeover in popular culture
- Artificial consciousness
  - Simulated consciousness in fiction
- Cultural diplomacy
- Existential risk from artificial intelligence
