= Jeff Yagher =

American actor

- Born: Jeffrey Brian Yagher; January 18, 1961 (age 65); Lawrence, Kansas, U.S.
- Education: Ohio State University, Columbus (BA); Yale University (MFA)
- Occupation: Actor
- Years active: 1984–present
- Spouse: Megan Gallagher
- Children: 2

Jeffrey Brian Yagher (born January 18, 1961) is an American actor.

== Personal life ==
Born in Lawrence, Kansas, he graduated from Ohio State University and then attended the Yale School of Drama, where he appeared in productions of The Vultures, We Can't Pay, We Won't Play, and Las Madres. His younger brother Kevin Yagher is a special effects technician. Yagher's second marriage is to actress Megan Gallagher, and they have two children together.

== Career ==
His television debut was in V: The Series as Kyle Bates. He starred in the pilot of 21 Jump Street as Tommy Hanson. He played both lead roles in The Twilight Zone episode "The Once and Future King", portraying both an Elvis impersonator and the real Elvis Presley, with a split screen used to allow him to appear alongside himself. He appeared in an episode of Newhart as Stoney and in the Seinfeld episode "The Rye" as John Jermaine, a jazz musician who dates Elaine Benes. He starred in the TV movie Bionic Showdown: The Six Million Dollar Man and the Bionic Woman along with Sandra Bullock in 1989. He appeared in several episodes of Six Feet Under, playing Hoyt Woodworth, in 2004. He appeared in Without a Trace (2007) and Bones (2009).

His film credits include Dead Man's Folly (1986), Big Bad Mama II (1987), Shag (1989), My Fellow Americans (1996), The Pandora Project (1998), and View from the Top (2003).

== Filmography ==
=== Film ===
Year	Title	Role	Notes
1987	Big Bad Mama II	Jordan Crawford	
1989	Shag	Jimmy Valentine	
1991	No Secrets	Michael	
1991	Lower Level	Craig Fulson	Direct-to-video
1993	The Red Coat	Short film	
1996	My Fellow Americans	Dorothy / Lt. Ralph Fleming	
1998	The Pandora Project	Bruce Bobbins	
2001	Pursuit of Happiness	Neighbor from 207	Uncredited
2003	View from the Top	Ghost Rider	
2005	Mr. & Mrs. Smith	40's Man	
2012	Atlas Shrugged: Part II	Jeff Allen	
2014	Atlas Shrugged Part III: Who Is John Galt?	Jeff Allen/Narrator	

=== Television ===
Year	Title	Role	Notes
1984–1985	V	Kyle Bates	Main role, 19 episodes
1985	Magnum, P.I.	Lieutenant Andy Hawkes, USN	Episode: "Blood and Honor"
1986	Dead Man's Folly	Eddie South	Television movie
1986	The Twilight Zone	Gary Pitkin / Elvis Presley	Episode: "The Once and Future King/A Saucer of Loneliness"
1986	The New Gidget	Jerry	Episode: "Jeff's Anniversary"
1986	Hotel	Tom	Episode: "Forsaking All Others"
1987	Murder, She Wrote	Deputy Wayne Beeler	Episode: "The Cemetery Vote"
1988
1988	September Gun	Brian Brian	Television movie
1988	Newhart	Stoney	Episode: "Goonstruck"
1989	Bionic Showdown: The Six Million Dollar Man and the Bionic Woman	Jim Goldman	Television movie
1989	Freddy's Nightmares	Rick Rake	Episode: "Silence Is Golden"
1990	Tales from the Crypt	Enoch, The Two-Faced Man	Episode: "Lower Berth"
1990	Shangri-La Plaza	George Bondo	Episode: "Pilot"
1990	Murder, She Wrote	Scott Fielding	Episode: "The Big Show of 1965"
1991	Pros and Cons	Jackson	Episode: "Once a Kid"
1992	Civil Wars	John Beaver	Episode: "Honi Soit Qui Mal Y Pense"
1992	Jake and the Fatman	Peter Dymitrow	Episode: "Ain't Misbehavin"
1992	Bodies of Evidence	Jack Houghton	Episode: "Nightmoves"
1992–1993	Room for Two	Keith Wyman	Main role, 26 episodes
1993	Doogie Howser, M.D.	Nathan Gage	Episode: "You've Come a Long Way, Babysitter"
1993	Murder, She Wrote	Marcus Rule	Episode: "Killer Radio"
1993	Mother of the Bride	Ken	Television movie
1994	One of Her Own	Heller	Television movie
1994	Madonna: Innocence Lost	Paul	Television movie
1995	Columbo	Teddy McVeigh	Episode: "Strange Bedfellows"
1995	Live Shot	Alex Rydell	Main role, 13 episodes
1996	Seinfeld	John	Episode: "The Rye"
1996	A Kidnapping in the Family	Jack Taylor	Television movie
1998	House Rules	Patrick	Episode: Pilot
1998	A Wing and a Prayer	Jack Lowe	Television movie
1998	The Net	Tim Daniels	Episode: "North by Northwestern"
1998	Millennium	Mark Bianco	Episode: "...Thirteen Years Later"
1999	The Practice	Reporter Michael Sawyer	Episode: "Lawyers, Reporters and Cockroaches"
1999	Zoe, Duncan, Jack & Jane	Kent	Episode: "Under Mom's Thumb"
1999	Action	Marty	Episode: "Mr. Dragon Goes to Washington"
1999	Oh Baby	Noah	Episode: "Friendship"
2000	It's Like, You Know...	Frank Wills	Episode: "Heat"
2000	Profiler	Jason Bendross	Episode: "Besieged"
2000	Family Law	N/A	Episode: "Metamorphosis"
2000	7th Heaven	Prof. Gene Hatch	Episode: "Losers"
2000	Star Trek: Voyager	Iden	Episode: "Flesh and Blood" (2-part episode)
2001	Mysterious Ways	Cal Montgomery	Episode: "Strike Two"
2001	Walker, Texas Ranger	Hawkins	Episode: "Medieval Crimes"
2001	Touched by an Angel	Mike Rice	Episode: "Netherlands"
2002	Crossing Jordan	Ross Larken	Episode: "As if by Fate"
2003	Reba	Terry Holliway	Episode: "Terry Holliway"
2004	Angel	Fell Leader	Episode: "Time Bomb"
2004–2005	Six Feet Under	Hoyt	Recurring role, 6 episodes
2005	Alias	Greyson Wells	Episode: "The Descent"
2007	Day Break	N/A	Episode: "What If He's Not Alone?"
2007	The Game	Mike	Episode: "The Big Chill?"
2007	Without a Trace	Gary Sedgwick	Episode: "The Beginning"
2009	Bones	Sean Mortenson	Episode: "The Critic in the Cabernet"
2009	CSI: Crime Scene Investigation	Brett McDowell	Episode: "The Lost Girls"
2011	Body of Proof	Dr. Adam Farber	Episode: "Your Number's Up"
