= Hawaiʻi Community College =

Public community college in Hawaii, U.S.

- Motto: E ʻImi Pono (Hawaiian)
- Motto in English: To Seek Excellence
- Type: Public community college
- Established: 1941; 85 years ago
- Parent institution: University of Hawaiʻi
- Accreditation: ACCJC
- Academic affiliations: Space-grant
- Students: 2,167
- Location: Hilo & Kailua-Kona, Hawaii, United States; 19°42′15″N 155°04′11″W
- Website: hawaii.hawaii.edu

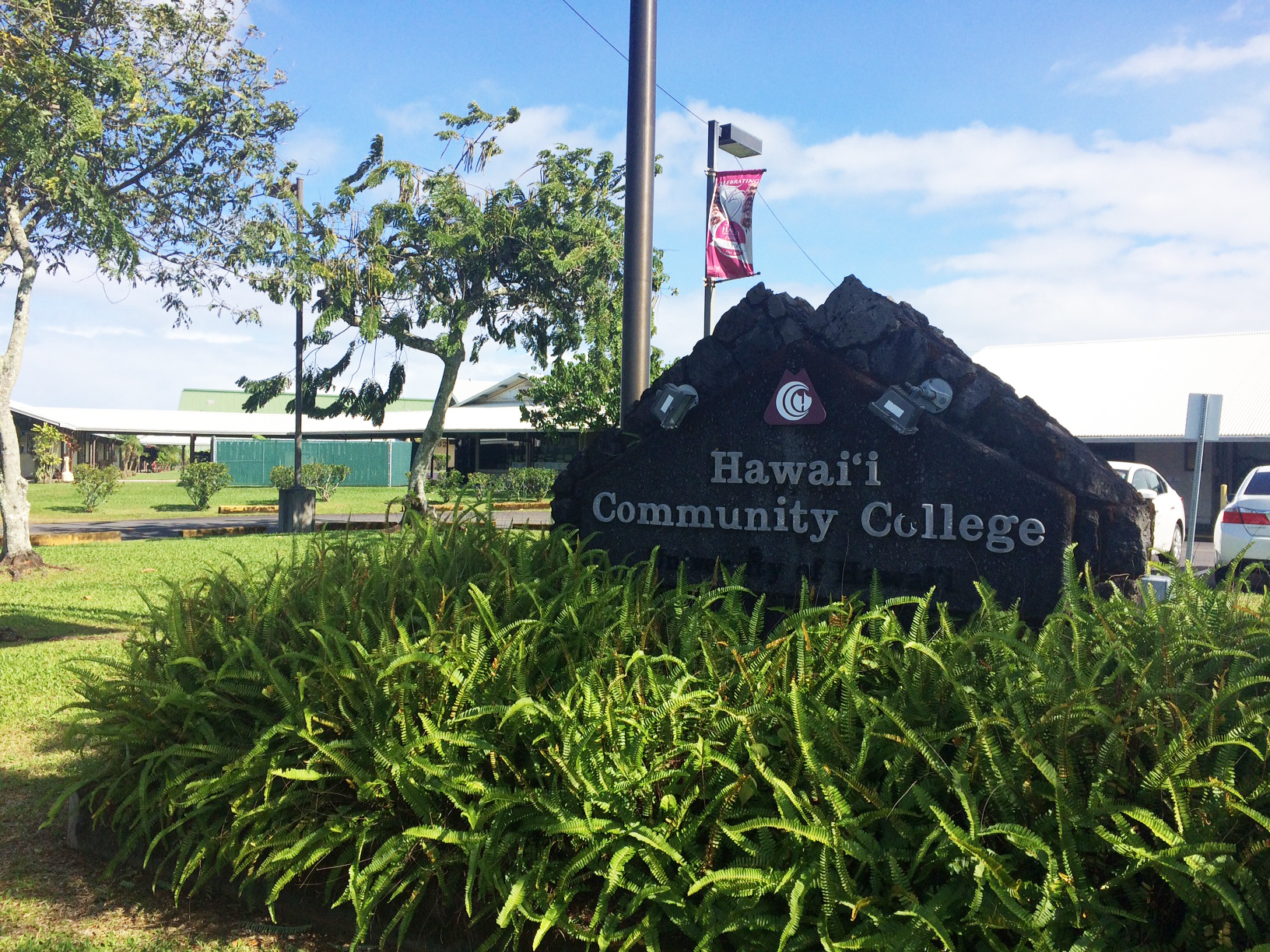
The entrance to Hawaiʻi Community College at Hilo, Hawaii, USA

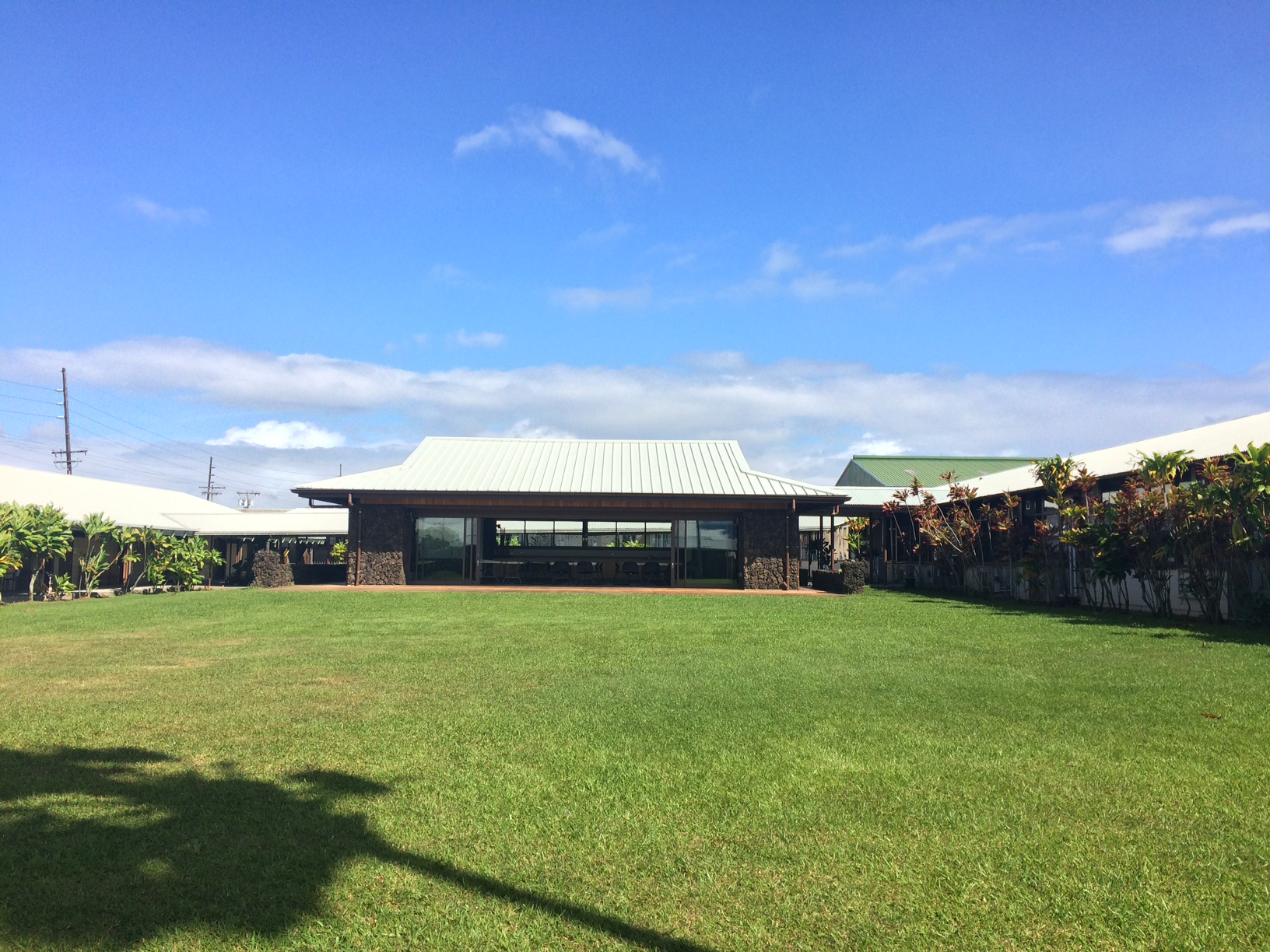
The courtyard of Hawaiʻi Community College at Hilo

Hawaiʻi Community College is a public community college with two campuses on the Island of Hawaii. It is part of the University of Hawaiʻi system and is accredited by the Accrediting Commission for Community and Junior Colleges.

== Hawaiʻi Community College at Hilo ==
Hawaiʻi Community College at Hilo is a public, co-educational commuter college in Hilo, Hawaii on the Island of Hawaii. It is one of ten branches of the University of Hawaiʻi system anchored by the University of Hawaiʻi at Mānoa in Honolulu and is accredited by the Western Association of Schools and Colleges. The campus is less than a mile away from the University of Hawaiʻi at Hilo. The two schools share some facilities, including the library, some classrooms and offices. The college began in 1941 as the Hawaiʻi Vocational School.

== Hawaiʻi Community College at Pālamanui ==
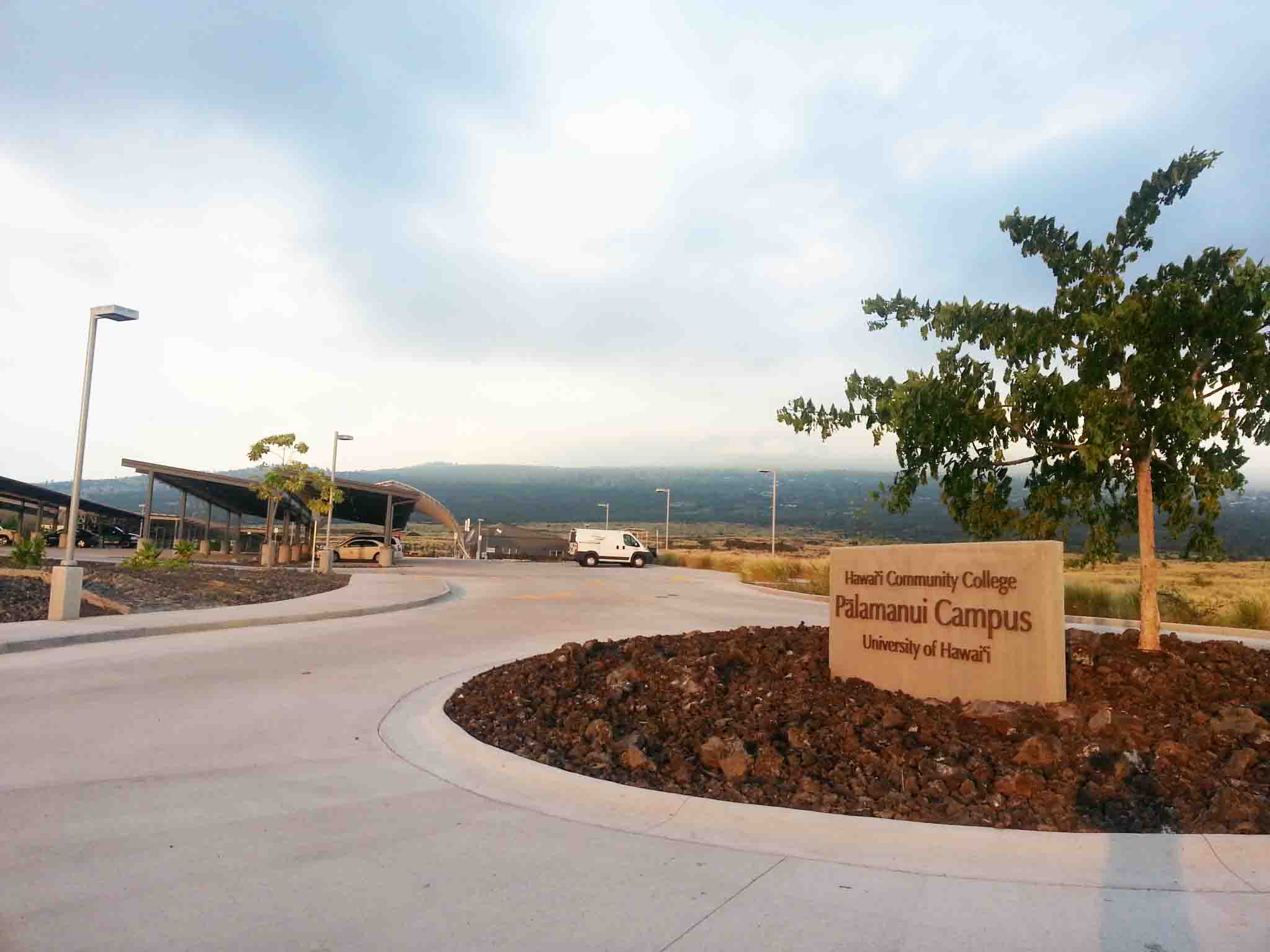
Hawaiʻi Community College at Pālamanui, near Kailua Kona, the Big Island of Hawaii.

Hawaiʻi Community College at Pālamanui, North Kona, opened in August, 2015. Associate degrees in culinary art, nursing, liberal arts, science, etc., can be obtained.
