= Hawaiian studies =

Academic discipline

Hawaiian studies is an academic discipline dedicated to the study of Hawaiians. It evolved in the second half of the 20th century partly in response to charges that traditional disciplines, such as anthropology, history, English language, ethnology, Asian Studies, and orientalism, were imbued with an inherently eurocentric perspective. Ethnic Studies has mostly been a study of minority settler cultures, although Hawaiian Studies shares with Ethnic Studies attempts to remedy problems with other academic disciplines by trying to study Hawaiian culture and people on their own terms, in their own language, acknowledging their own values.

== History ==
In Hawaii, the discipline of Hawaiian Studies evolved out of the Civil Rights Movement and early 1970s, which saw growing self-awareness and radicalization of American Indians and Decolonization struggles around the world. Hawaiian Studies courses and then departments were established on campus around Hawaii. Thinkers like Frantz Fanon, Ngũgĩ wa Thiong'o and Linda Tuhiwai Smith influence Hawaiian Studies.

While early Hawaiian Studies scholarship focused on the previously repressed histories and identities of Hawaiian groups within the context of the U.S., over time the field of study has expanded to encompass ontological/epistemological philosophy, transnationalism, comparative race studies and postmodernist/poststructuralist critiques. While pioneering thinkers relied on frameworks, theories and methodologies such as those found in the allied fields of sociology, history, literature and film, scholars in the field today utilize multidisciplinary as well as comparative perspectives, increasingly within an international or transnational context.

Professor Haunani Kay Trask became the first tenured professor in Hawaiian Studies at the University of Hawaii at Manoa in 1986. She assisted Lilikala Kame'eleihiwa, Jonathan Osorio and Terry Kanalu Young in obtaining their doctorates on Hawaiian Studies topics and in becoming tenured professors in Hawaiian Studies. After years of effort, Gladys Kamakakuokalani Brandt and Trask were able to get funding to build a permanent home for the Center for Hawaiian Studies. It is now called the Kamakakuokalani Center for Hawaiian Studies. The Center added two master's degree programs in Hawaiian Studies in 2005. The center is now part of the Hawaiʻinuiakea School of Hawaiian Knowledge.

The Hawaiian Studies program at the University of Hawaii at Hilo is centered more closely around the instruction of the Hawaiian language. In 1997, the Ka Haka ‘Ula O Ke‘elikōlani College of Hawaiian Language was established to complement its Hale Kuamoʻo.

The Hawaiian Studies program at the Brigham Young University Hawaii structures its instruction and research around perceived connections between Hawaiian culture and the Book of Mormon and other doctrinal beliefs of the Church of Jesus Christ of Latter-day Saints.

== Criticism ==
Hawaiian Studies has faced some opposition and rejection from critics. They have no objection about Hawaiian culture being legitimate topics of academic research. What they object to is the current state of Ethnic Studies which they see as characterised by excessive left wing political ideology or Hawaiian claims to justice which, in their view, greatly undermined the scholarly validity of the research. Hawaiian Studies has been accused of promoting "racial separatism", "racial supremacy"", linguistic isolation" and "racial preference".

Professor Haunani-Kay Trask was criticized for contributing to a culture of systemic racism and violence against white people in Hawaii in an intelligence report published by the Southern Poverty Law Center (SPLC). The Law Center wrote that Professor Trask's book From A Native Daughter justifies hatred against white people by Native Hawaiians. The SPLC also finds violence against white people as being justified in Trask's poem, Racist White Woman, which reads in part: "I could kick/Your face, puncture/Both eyes./You deserve this kind/Of violence./No more vicious/Tongues, obscene/Lies./Just a knife/Slitting your tight/Little heart."

At a guest lecture at Stanford University, Trask embraced the label of 'racist', saying, "In Hawaii, I am probably the most famous racist." She added that it impossible for a Hawaiian to not be considered racist in Hawaii unless "you dance in a hotel". She also stated that, if she could have her way, non-Hawaiians would have no property rights in a sovereign Hawaii.

Proponents of Hawaiian Studies feel that opposition comes from a reactionary movement from the right. They point out the rise of the conservative movement in the United States during the 1990s which saw the discipline come increasingly under attack. For proponents, the backlash is characterised as an attempt to preserve "traditional values" of Western culture, symbolized by the United States. For some critics, this actually is a slant by the proponents to disparage criticism by false association to right wing ideology.

Hawaiian Studies has suffered most criticism by attorney William Burgess and retired high school mathematics teacher Kenneth Conklin. Their criticism is political and aimed at Hawaiian claims to justice and has never really attacked the actual scholarship of Hawaiian Studies scholars.

== See also ==
- Hawaiian language
- Native American studies
- Cultural studies
- Willowdean Chatterson Handy
