= Nonopapa Lake =

Lake in Niʻihau Island, Hawaii, United States

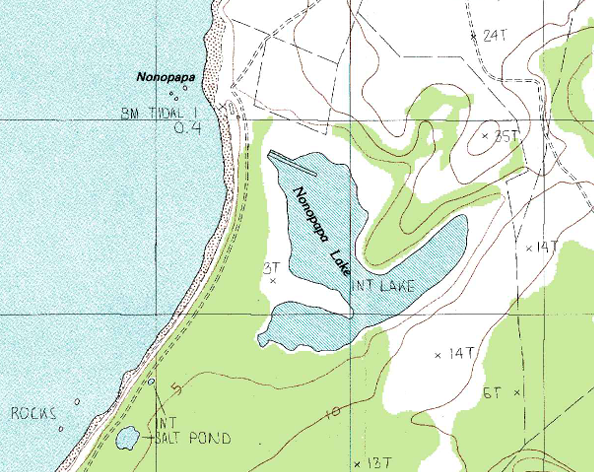
- Topographic map of Nonopapa Lake

- Location within Hawaii Location within Pacific Ocean
- Location: Niʻihau
- Coordinates: 21°51′42″N 160°13′38″W
- Catchment area: 370 acres (150 ha)
- Basin countries: United States
- Surface area: 370 acres (150 ha)
- Surface elevation: 9.8 ft (3 m)

Nonopapa Lake is an ephemeral lake on the western shore of the south central region of the island of Niʻihau. It is separated from the Pacific Ocean by a stable dune measuring 13–16 ft high and 260 ft wide.

The lake measures around 370 acres (150 ha) during the rainy seasons. Together with Halaliʻi Lake, Halulu Lake, and various ponds on the island, Niʻihau can hold up to 2,000 acres (810 ha) of water. During dry periods on the arid island, the lake transforms into a dry reddish flat punctuated by small saline lakes.

According to Hawaiian linguists Mary Kawena Pukui, Samuel H. Elbert, and Esther T. Mookini, Nonopapa has the literal meaning of 'invalid' in the native Hawaiian language, likely in reference to the transient nature of the lake.

The Makaloa sedge (Cyperus laevigatus) grows along its shore and was traditionally used by the Native Hawaiians for weaving the Makaloa mats. The lake bed was also used for the cultivation of sugarcane, famously growing "in the sand with only leaves protruding". Sheep were sheared in shacks built between the lake and beach dunes.

The lake provides natural wetland habitats for Hawaiian bird species including the ʻalae keʻokeʻo (Hawaiian coot), aeʻo (Hawaiian stilt) and koloa maoli (Hawaiian duck). The lake is also used for mullet farming, as young fish enter the lake from the sea through lava tubes. Hawaiians bring the baby pua (mullet fish) from the sea in barrels, release them during the rainy seasons, and catch the grown fish when the water recedes in the summer. The grown fish are often sold at market on Kauaʻi and Oʻahu.

== See also ==
- List of lakes in Hawaii

== Bibliography ==
- United States. Bureau of Sport Fisheries and Wildlife (1970). Hawaii’s Endangered Waterbirds. Portland, OR: The Bureau.
- U.S. Geological Survey. W733X49211_001 GeoPDF (Niʻihau Island, Hawaiʻi) – Graticule and Grids Based on North American Datum 1983; Sheet Corners Established on Old Hawaiian Datum (OHD) (PDF) (Map). U.S. Geological Survey.
- Holthus, P. F. (1988). Report to Congress, Coastal Barrier Resources System: Summary Report; Coastal Barriers of Hawaii and American Samoa — Appendix C (PDF). U.S. Department of the Interior. p. 18.
- Joesting, Edward (1988). Kauai: The Separate Kingdom. Honolulu: University of Hawaii Press. ISBN 978-0-8248-1162-4. OCLC 154200817.
- Tava, Rerioterai; Keale, Moses K. (1990). Niihau: The Traditions of a Hawaiian Island. Honolulu: Mutual Publishing Company. ISBN 9780935180800. OCLC 21275453.
- Young, Peter T. (August 22, 2012). "Ni'ihau Lakes". Image of Old Hawaiʻi. Hoʻokuleana LLC.
- Fisher, Harvey I. (January 1951). "The Avifauna of Niihau Island, Hawaiian Archipelago" (PDF). The Condor. 53 (1). Santa Clara, CA: Cooper Ornithological Club: 31–42. doi:10.2307/1364585. JSTOR 1364585.
- Hawaii. Department of Land and Natural Resources. Division of Water and Land Development; Fukunaga & Associates (1980). Statewide Silt Basin Investigation: State of Hawaii. Honolulu: The Division. p. 34.
- Pukui, Mary Kawena; Elbert, Samuel H.; Mookini, Esther T. (1974). Place Names of Hawaii (Paperback ed.). Honolulu: University of Hawaii Press.
