= Halulu Lake =

Lake in Hawaii, United States

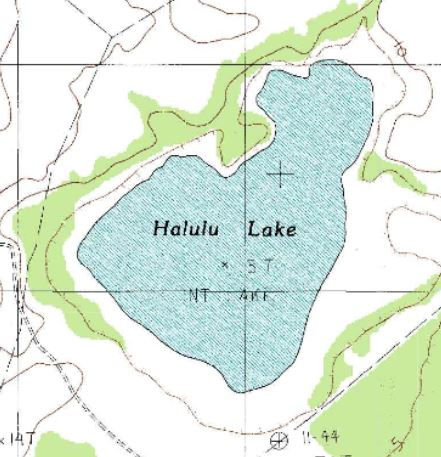
- Topographic map of Halulu Lake

- Location within Hawaii
- Location: Niʻihau
- Coordinates: 21.868°N 160.207°W
- Basin countries: United States
- Surface area: 182 acres (74 ha) or 371 acres (150 ha)
- Surface elevation: 9.8 ft (3 m)

Halulu Lake is a lake in the south central region of the island of Niʻihau (the smallest inhabited island in the chain). It is the largest (non-intermittent) natural lake in the Hawaiian Islands and ranks third in size after Halaliʻi Lake (also on Niʻihau) and Keālia Pond (on Maui) which are intermittent bodies of water.

The lake measures around 182 acres (74 ha) during the rainy seasons. During dry periods on the arid island, the shallow lake shrinks due to effect of evaporation. Other sources give it the measurement of 371 acres (150 ha).

According to Hawaiian linguists Mary Kawena Pukui, Samuel H. Elbert, and Esther T. Mookini, the lake shares its name with the land division of Halulu on the island and probably originated from the man-eating halulu bird of Hawaiian mythology. Halaliʻi and Halulu were also the names of important Hawaiian high chiefs (aliʻi) of the island of Niʻihau.

Prior to the attack on Pearl Harbor during World War II, Niʻihau owner and rancher Aylmer Francis Robinson plowed trenches using mules and tractors into the lakes and surrounding lands on Niʻihau to prevent Japanese planes from landing and using the island as a military airfield. These efforts led to the crash landing of Imperial Japanese Navy Air Service pilot Shigenori Nishikaichi during the Niihau incident. Many of the furrows are still visible today on the island.

The lake provides natural wetland habitats for Hawaiian bird species including the ʻalae keʻokeʻo (Hawaiian coot), aeʻo (Hawaiian stilt) and koloa maoli (Hawaiian duck). The lake is also home to mullets which naturally enter the lake from the sea through lava tubes when they are young. In ancient Hawaii, a kapu forbade Hawaiians from catching the fish in the lake except during harvest time. Modern day Niihauans use the lakes and ponds on the island for mullet farming, bringing the baby pua mullets from the sea in barrels. The grown fish are later sold at market on Kauaʻi and Oʻahu.

== See also ==
- List of lakes in Hawaii

== Bibliography ==
- Doak, Robin Santos (2003). Hawaii: The Aloha State. Milwaukee: World Almanac Library. ISBN 978-0-8368-5149-6. OCLC 302362168.
- Fisher, Harvey I. (January 1951). "The Avifauna of Niihau Island, Hawaiian Archipelago" (PDF). The Condor. 53 (1). Santa Clara, CA: Cooper Ornithological Club: 31–42. doi:10.2307/1364585. JSTOR 1364585. OCLC 4907610428.
- Gobetz, Wally (May 26, 2010). "Oʻahu – Honolulu – Ford Island: Pacific Aviation Museum – Cletrac Tractor". Flickr.
- Juvik, James O; Juvik, Sonia P; Paradise, Thomas R. (1998). Atlas of Hawaiʻi. Honolulu: University of Hawaii Press. ISBN 978-0-8248-2125-8. OCLC 246132868.
- Morgan, Joseph (1996). Hawaiʻi, a Unique Geography. Honolulu: Bess Press. ISBN 978-1-57306-021-9. OCLC 249274291.
- Pukui, Mary Kawena; Elbert, Samuel H.; Mookini, Esther T. (1974). Place Names of Hawaii. Honolulu: University of Hawaii Press. ISBN 978-0-8248-0524-1. OCLC 1042464.
- Tava, Rerioterai; Keale, Moses K. (1990). Niihau: The Traditions of a Hawaiian Island. Honolulu: Mutual Publishing Company. ISBN 9780935180800. OCLC 21275453.
- Young, Peter T. (August 22, 2012). "Ni'ihau Lakes". Image of Old Hawaiʻi. Hoʻokuleana LLC.
