= Ālieiki Lake =

Lake in Niʻihau Island, Hawaii, United States

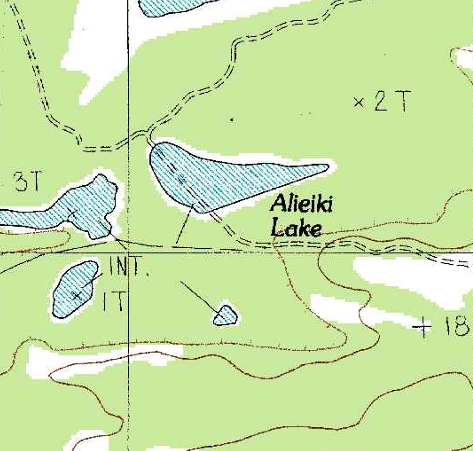
- Topographic map of Ālieiki Lake

- Location within Hawaii Location within Pacific Ocean
- Location: Niʻihau
- Coordinates: 21°50′31″N 160°11′36″W
- Type: ephemeral lake
- Basin countries: United States
- Max. length: 0.35 km (0.22 mi)
- Max. width: 0.12 km (0.075 mi)
- Surface area: 35 acres (14 ha)
- Surface elevation: 9.8 ft (3.0 m)

Ālieiki Lake is an ephemeral lake located in the southern part of the island of Niʻihau. It appears on Hawaiian place-name records, early geological bulletins, and topographic maps of Niʻihau compiled in the early to mid-20th century.

During the rainy season, low-lying areas fill with fresh water and the lake swells to approximately 35 acres in area. It is located directly south of Halaliʻi Lake, the largest natural lake in the Hawaiian Islands. In dry periods on the arid island, Alieiki becomes a flat reddish dry lakebed.

The Makaloa sedge (Cyperus laevigatus) grows along the lake’s margins and was traditionally used by Native Hawaiians to weave Makaloa mats. The wetlands surrounding Alieiki provide habitat for several native Hawaiian waterbirds, including the ʻalae keʻokeʻo (Hawaiian coot), aeʻo (Hawaiian stilt), and koloa maoli (Hawaiian duck).

The lake is also part of traditional mullet (pua) aquaculture practices historically carried out on Niʻihau. Young fish enter through lava tubes or are transported in barrels during the rainy season. As water levels recede in the summer, adult mullet are harvested and often sold on Kauaʻi and Oʻahu.

== See also ==
- List of lakes in Hawaii

== Bibliography ==
- Pukui, Mary Kawena; Elbert, Samuel H.; Mookini, Esther T. (1974). Place Names of Hawaii. Honolulu: University of Hawaii Press.
- Powers, Sidney (1920). Dana, Edward S. (ed.). "Notes on Hawaiian Petrology". The American Journal of Science. Harvard University Press: 256–280.
- Wentworth, Chester K. (1925). The Geology of Lānai. Bulletin no. 24. Honolulu: Bernice P. Bishop Museum Press. pp. 92, 258.
- Aitken, Robert T. (1930). Ethnology of Tubuai. Bayard Dominick Expedition Bulletin no. 70. Honolulu: Bernice P. Bishop Museum. p. 92.
- Bishop Museum Press (1990). Occasional Papers No. 30: Lakes of Niʻihau Islands (PDF). Honolulu: Bernice P. Bishop Museum. p. 90.
- Fisher, Harvey I. (January 1951). "The Avifauna of Niihau Island, Hawaiian Archipelago" (PDF). The Condor. 53 (1). Cooper Ornithological Club: 31–42. doi:10.2307/1364585. JSTOR 1364585.
- Young, Peter T. (August 22, 2012). "Ni'ihau Lakes". Image of Old Hawaiʻi. Hoʻokuleana LLC.
- Tava, Rerioterai; Keale, Moses K. (1990). Niihau: The Traditions of a Hawaiian Island. Honolulu: Mutual Publishing Company. ISBN 9780935180800. OCLC 21275453.
- U.S. Geological Survey (2020). W733X49211_001 GeoPDF (Niʻihau Island, Hawaiʻi) – Graticule and Grids Based on North American Datum 1983; Sheet Corners Established on Old Hawaiian Datum (OHD) (PDF) (Map). U.S. Geological Survey.
