= Halaliʻi Lake =

Lake in Niʻihau Island, Hawaii, United States

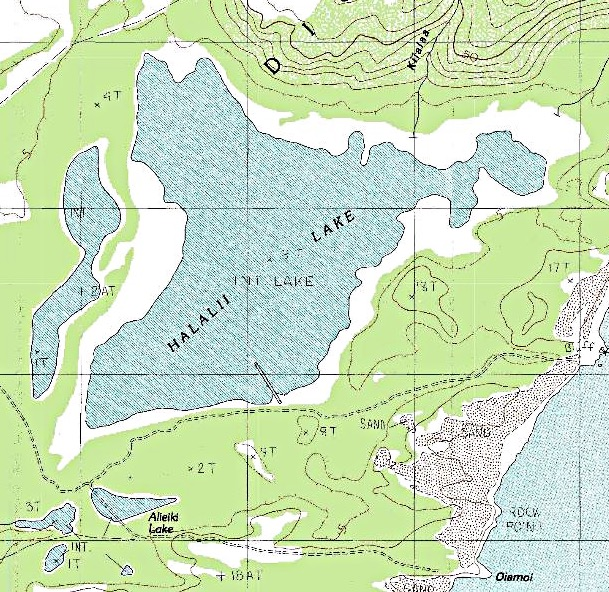
- Topographic map of Halalii Lake

- Location within Hawaii Location within Pacific Ocean
- Location: Niʻihau
- Coordinates: 21°51′18″N 160°11′10″W
- Catchment area: 840.7 acres (340.2 ha)
- Basin countries: United States
- Surface area: 840.7 acres (340.2 ha)
- Surface elevation: 9.8 ft (3 m)

Halaliʻi Lake is an ephemeral lake in the south central region of the island of Niʻihau. During the rainy seasons, it becomes the largest lake in the Hawaiian Islands. It is located near the smaller Halulu Lake, regarded as the largest (non-intermittent) natural lake in the Hawaiian Islands.

The lake measures around 840.7 acres (340.2 ha) during the rainy seasons. During dry periods on the arid island, the lake transforms into a dry reddish flat punctuated by small saline lakes. Other sources states that it has an area of 860 acres (350 ha). Sometimes it is not regarded as a lake due to the irregularity of the water level.

According to Hawaiian linguists Mary Kawena Pukui, Samuel H. Elbert, and Esther T. Mookini, the lake and the surrounding land division was named after its owner, either the Hawaiian high chief (aliʻi) or the Oʻahu trickster god Halaliʻi. Halaliʻi and Halulu were both aliʻi of the island of Niʻihau. A cinder cone of Haleakalā on the island of Maui also shares the same name.

The Makaloa sedge (Cyperus laevigatus) grows along its shore and was traditionally used by the Native Hawaiians for weaving the Makaloa mats. The lake bed was also used for the cultivation of sugarcane where famously it grew "in the sand with only leaves protruding".

The lake provides natural wetland habitats for Hawaiian bird species including the ʻalae keʻokeʻo (Hawaiian coot), aeʻo (Hawaiian stilt) and koloa maoli (Hawaiian duck). The lake is also used for mullet farming. Hawaiians bring the baby pua mullets from the sea in barrels, release them during the rainy seasons and then catch the grown fish when the water recedes in the summer. In Halulu Lake, the fish naturally enter the lake from the sea through lava tubes when they are young. The grown fish are often sold at market on Kauaʻi and Oʻahu.

== See also ==
- List of lakes in Hawaii

== Bibliography ==
- Doak, Robin Santos (2003). Hawaii: The Aloha State. Milwaukee: World Almanac Library. ISBN 978-0-8368-5149-6. OCLC 302362168.
- Fisher, Harvey I. (January 1951). "The Avifauna of Niihau Island, Hawaiian Archipelago" (PDF). The Condor. 53 (1). Santa Clara, CA: Cooper Ornithological Club: 31–42. doi:10.2307/1364585. JSTOR 1364585. OCLC 4907610428.
- Joesting, Edward (1988). Kauai: The Separate Kingdom. Honolulu: University of Hawaii Press. ISBN 978-0-8248-1162-4. OCLC 154200817.
- Juvik, James O; Juvik, Sonia P; Paradise, Thomas R. (1998). Atlas of Hawaiʻi. Honolulu: University of Hawaii Press. ISBN 978-0-8248-2125-8. OCLC 246132868.
- Pukui, Mary Kawena; Elbert, Samuel H.; Mookini, Esther T. (1974). Place Names of Hawaii. Honolulu: University of Hawaii Press. ISBN 978-0-8248-0524-1. OCLC 1042464.
- Tava, Rerioterai; Keale, Moses K. (1990). Niihau: The Traditions of a Hawaiian Island. Honolulu: Mutual Publishing Company. ISBN 9780935180800. OCLC 21275453.
- Young, Peter T. (August 22, 2012). "Ni'ihau Lakes". Image of Old Hawaiʻi. Hoʻokuleana LLC.
