= Niʻihau =

Seventh largest island in Hawaii

Nickname: The Forbidden Isle
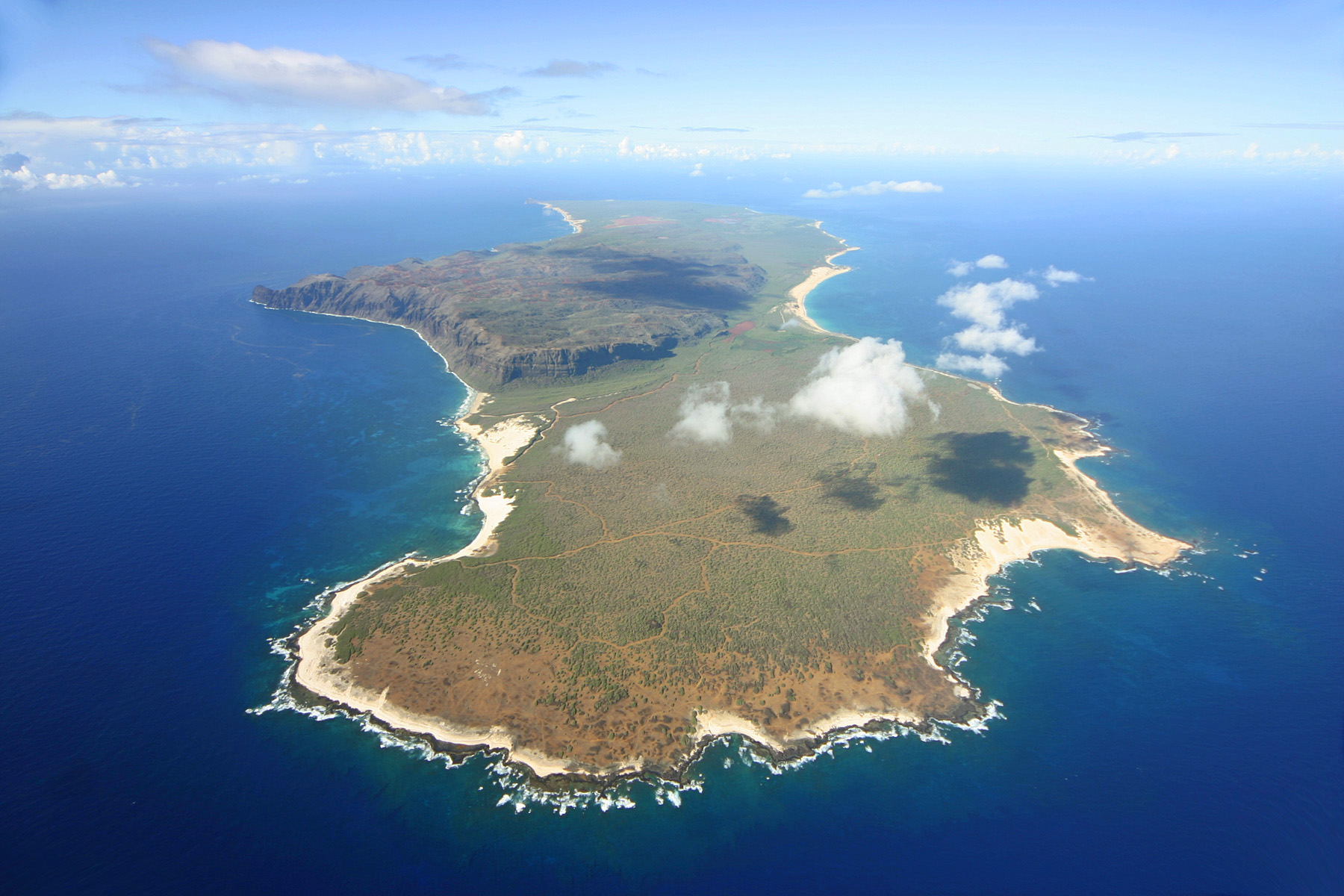
- Aerial view of Niʻihau looking southwestward

- Location of Niʻihau in the State of Hawaiʻi

- Location within Hawaii Location within North Pacific

Geography
- Location: North Pacific Ocean
- Coordinates: 21°54′N 160°10′W
- Area: 69.5 sq mi (180 km^{2})
- Area rank: 7th largest Hawaiian Island
- Highest elevation: 1,250 ft (381 m)
- Highest point: Mount Pānīʻau

Administration
- United States
- State: Hawaiʻi
- County: Kauaʻi
- Owner(s): Bruce Robinson; Keith Robinson
- Symbols
- Flower: Pūpū keʻokeʻo (white shell)
- Color: Keʻokeʻo (white)
- Largest settlement: Puʻuwai

Demographics
- Population: 84 (2020)
- Pop. density: 1.9/sq mi (0.73/km^{2})
- Ethnic groups: Hawaiian

Additional information
- Time zone: Hawaii–Aleutian

Niʻihau, (Note: /ˈniː.iː.haʊ/ NEE-ee-how or /ˈniː.haʊ/ NEE-how; Hawaiian pronunciation: [ˈni.ʔi.ˈhɐw].) sometimes written Niihau, is the seventh largest island in Hawaii and the westernmost of the main islands. It is 17.5 miles (28.2 km) southwest of Kauaʻi across the Kaulakahi Channel. Its area is 69.5 square miles (180 km^{2}). Several intermittent playa lakes provide wetland habitats for the Hawaiian coot, the Hawaiian stilt, and the Hawaiian duck. The island is designated as critical habitat for Brighamia insignis, an endemic and endangered species of Hawaiian lobelioid. The United States Census Bureau defines Niihau and the neighboring island and State Seabird Sanctuary of Lehua as Census Tract 410 of Kauaʻi County, Hawaii. Its 2010 census population was 170, most of them Native Hawaiians. As of the 2020 census, the population had fallen to 84. The people of Niʻihau are noted for their gemlike lei pūpū (shell lei) craftsmanship. They speak Hawaiian as a primary language, being the only place where Hawaiian has not been in any way displaced by English.

The Scottish plantation owner Elizabeth Sinclair purchased Niʻihau from the Kingdom of Hawaiʻi in 1864 for $10,000 US dollars (equivalent to $212,000 as of 2026). This would have been roughly 530 troy ounces of gold, which would be worth approximately $2.18 million in July 2026. (Note: Note: An investment of $10,000 in the U.S. stock market in 1864 would be worth between $11.5 billion and $24 billion today.)

Ownership of the island passed to her descendants, the Robinson family. The island is currently managed by brothers Bruce and Keith Robinson. The island has attracted some controversy for the strict rules the Robinson family imposes on the island and its inhabitants. Known as "the Forbidden Isle", it is off-limits to all outsiders except the Robinson family and their relatives, U.S. Navy personnel, government officials, and invited guests. From 1987 onward, a limited number of supervised activity tours and hunting safaris have opened to tourists.

During World War II, the island was the site of the Niʻihau incident, in which, following the attack on Pearl Harbor, a Japanese navy fighter pilot crashed on the island and received help from the island's residents of Japanese descent.

== Geography ==
Niʻihau is located about 18 miles (29 km) west of Kauaʻi, and the tiny, uninhabited island of Lehua lies 0.7 miles (0.61 nmi; 1.1 km) north of Niʻihau. Niʻihau's dimensions are 6.2 miles by 18.6 miles (10km × 30km). The maximum elevation, Pānīʻau, is 1,280 feet (390 m). The island is about 6 million years old, making it geologically older than the 5.8-million-year-old neighboring island of Kauaʻi to the northeast. Niʻihau is the remnant of the southwestern slope of what was once a much larger volcano. The entire summit and other slopes collapsed into the ocean in a giant prehistoric landslide.

=== Climate ===
The island is relatively arid because it lies in the rain shadow of Kauaʻi and lacks the elevation needed to catch significant amounts of trade wind rainfall. Niʻihau, therefore, depends on winter Kona storms for its rain, when more southerly weather systems intrude into the region. As such, the island is subject to long periods of drought. Historical droughts on Niʻihau have been recorded several times, one in 1792 by Captain James Cook's former junior officer, George Vancouver, who had been told that the people of Niʻihau had abandoned the island because of a severe drought and had moved to Kauaʻi to escape famine.

Climate data for Puʻuwai
Month	Jan	Feb	Mar	Apr	May	Jun	Jul	Aug	Sep	Oct	Nov	Dec	Year
Mean daily maximum °F (°C)	79 (26)	79 (26)	81 (27)	82 (28)	83 (28)	85 (29)	86 (30)	87 (31)	87 (31)	86 (30)	83 (28)	81 (27)	83 (28)
Mean daily minimum °F (°C)	65 (18)	65 (18)	65 (18)	66 (19)	67 (19)	69 (21)	70 (21)	71 (22)	71 (22)	70 (21)	68 (20)	66 (19)	68 (20)
Average rainfall inches (mm)	2.96 (75)	1.48 (38)	1.53 (39)	0.75 (19)	0.63 (16)	0.33 (8.4)	0.50 (13)	0.62 (16)	0.84 (21)	2.35 (60)	2.74 (70)	2.78 (71)	17.51 (445)
Source: The Weather Channel

=== Flora and fauna ===
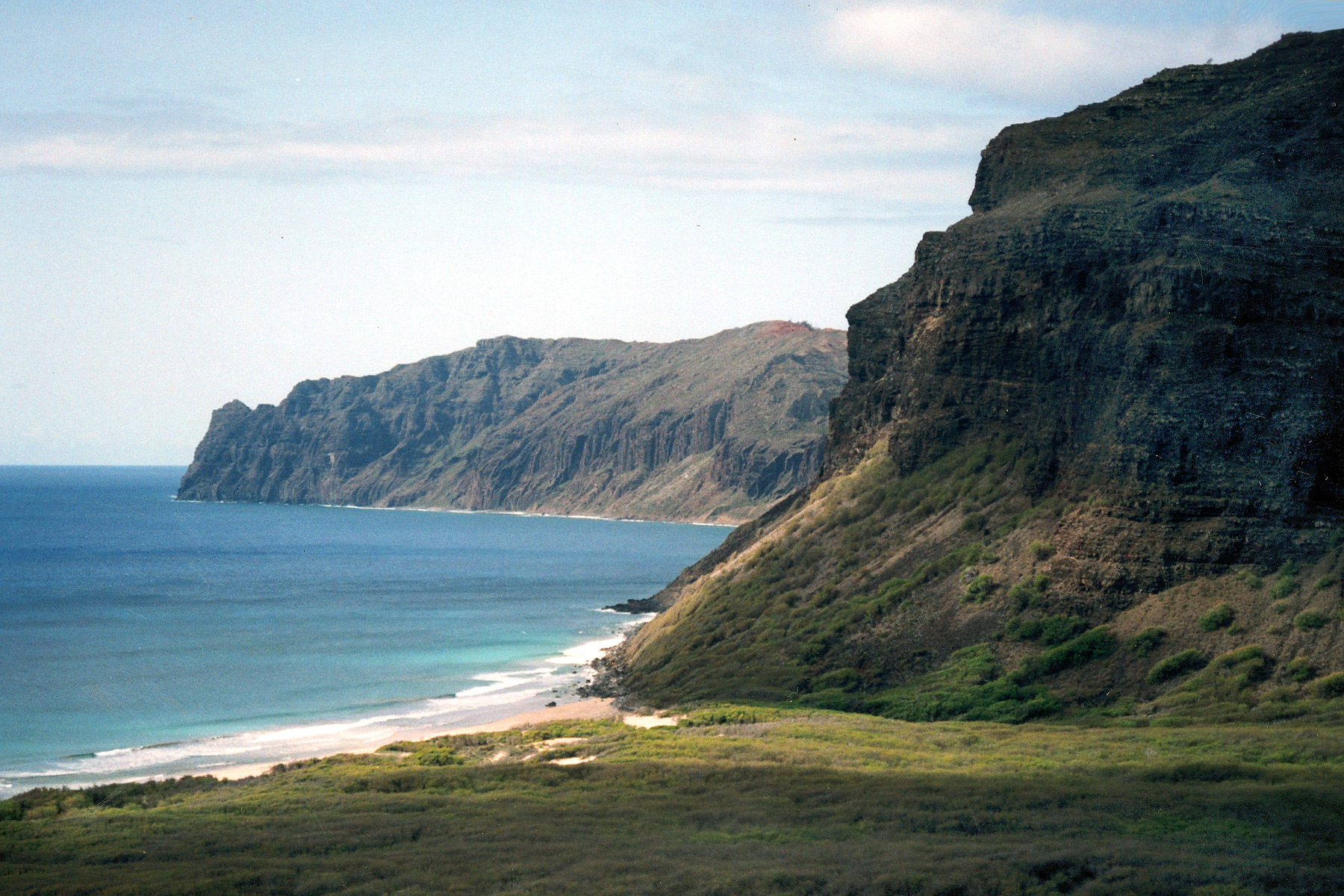
View of the rugged cliffs of windward Niʻihau (the northeastern shore)

As an arid island, Niʻihau was barren of trees for centuries – Captain James Cook reported it treeless in 1778. Aubrey Robinson, grandfather of current owners Bruce Robinson and Keith Robinson, planted 10,000 trees per year during much of his ownership of the island; Robinson's afforestation efforts increased rainfall in the dry climate. Island co-owner Keith Robinson, a noted conservationist, preserved and documented many of Niʻihau's natural plant resources. The island is designated as a critical habitat for the ʻōlulu, an endemic and endangered species of Hawaiian lobelioid. Pritchardia aylmer-robinsonii, a palm tree named for Keith Robinson's uncle Aylmer Robinson, is an endangered species native to Niʻihau.

Several bird species thrive on Niʻihau. The largest lakes on the island are Halaliʻi Lake, Halulu Lake and Nonopapa Lake. These intermittent playa lakes on the island (including Ālieiki Lake) provide wetland habitats for the ʻalae keʻokeʻo (Hawaiian coot), the aeʻo (Hawaiian subspecies of Black-necked Stilt), and the koloa maoli (Hawaiian duck). The vulnerable Hawaiian monk seal (Monachus schauinslandi) is found in high numbers on Niʻihau's shores. Robinson states that Niʻihau's secluded shoreline offers them a safe haven from habitat encroachments. According to Robinson, conditions there are better than the government refuges of the Northwestern Hawaiian Islands. When the Robinsons originally purchased Niʻihau, no monk seals were present, because they lived in the northwestern part of the Hawaiian island chain, Necker and Midway islands. They have been relocated to the main Hawaiian island chain by NOAA fisheries over the past thirty years, and some have found homes on Niʻihau.

Big game herds, imported from stock on Molokaʻi Ranch in recent years, roam Niʻihau's forests and flatlands. Eland and aoudad are abundant, along with oryxes, wild boars and feral sheep. These big game herds provide income from hunting safari tourism.

== History ==
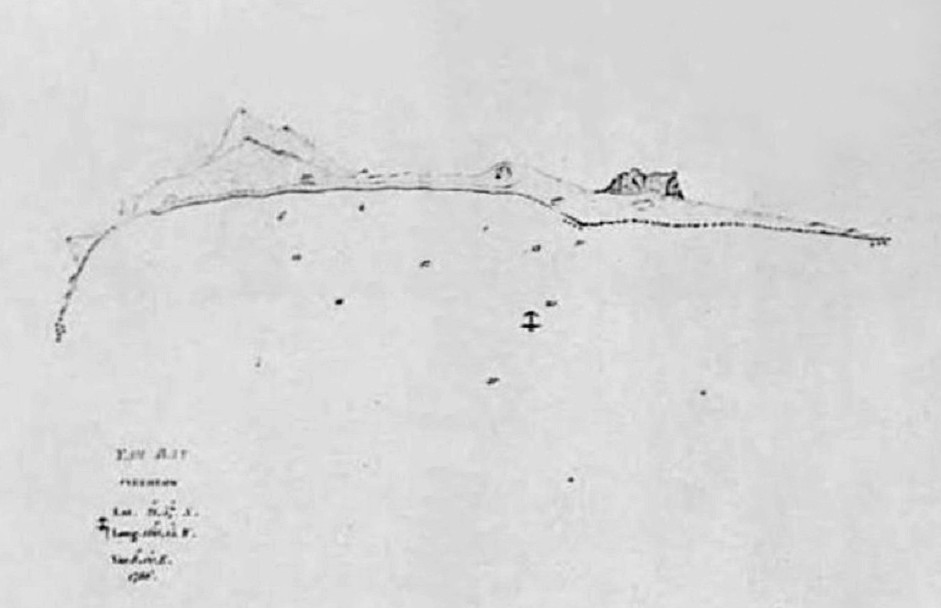
Map of Yam Bay and Niʻihau, Captain George Dixon's Journal, 1788.

Prior to the unification of the Kingdom of Hawaiʻi under Kamehameha I, Niʻihau was ruled by the aliʻi. Kahelelani was the first of the Niʻihau aliʻi. His name is now used to refer to the Niʻihau kahelelani, the puka shell of the wart turbans (Leptothyra verruca), used to make exquisite Niʻihau shell jewelry. Kāʻeokūlani was a ruler of northern Niʻihau who unified the island after defeating his rival, a chief named Kawaihoa. A stone wall (Pāpōhaku) across a quarter of the island's southern end marked the boundaries of the two chiefs: Kāʻeo's land was identified by black stones and Kawaihoa's by white stones. Eventually, a great battle took place, known as Pali Kamakaui. Kāʻeo's two brothers from the island of Maui, Kaʻiana and his half-brother Kahekili II, the King of Maui, fought for Kāʻeo, and Niʻihau was united under his rule. Kawaihoa was banished to the south end of the island and Kāʻeo moved to the middle of the island to govern. Kāʻeo married the Queen Kamakahelei, and a future king of Niʻihau and Kauaʻi named Kaumualiʻi was born in 1790. Kauaʻi and Niʻihau are said to have carried the "highest blood lines" in the Hawaiian Islands.

Kamehameha managed to unify all of the islands by 1795, except for Kauaʻi and Niʻihau. Two attempts to conquer those islands had failed, and Kamehameha lost many men: bodies covered the beaches on Kauaʻi's eastern shores. Finally, in 1810, Kamehameha amassed a great fleet, and Kaumualiʻi, the last independent aliʻi, surrendered rather than risk further bloodshed. Independence again became feasible after Kamehameha's death in 1819, but was put down when Kamehameha's widow Kaʻahumanu kidnapped Kaumualiʻi and forced him to marry her. Thereafter Niʻihau remained part of the unified Hawaiian Kingdom.

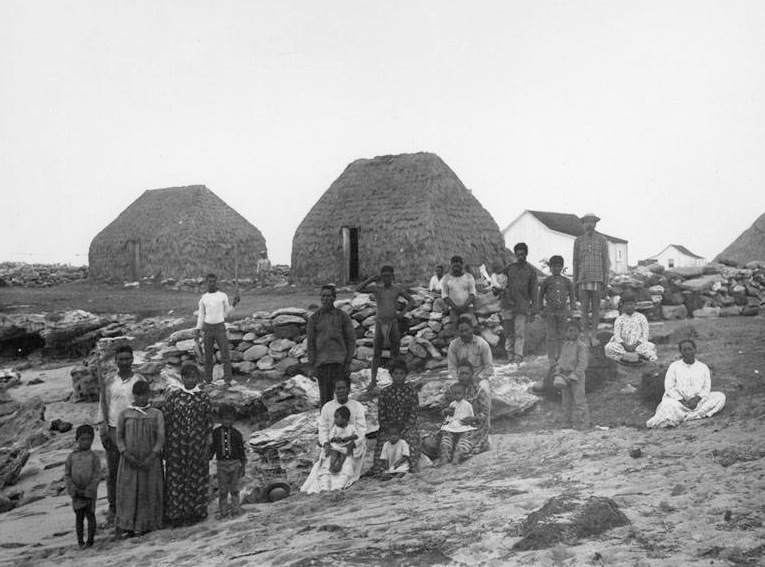
A group of villagers at Puʻuwai Beach settlement, Niʻihau in 1885. Photograph taken by Francis Sinclair, son of Elizabeth McHutchison Sinclair.

Elizabeth McHutchison Sinclair (1800–1892) purchased Niʻihau and parts of Kauaʻi from Kamehameha V in 1864 for US$10,000 in gold (roughly $2.18 million as of July 2026). Sinclair chose Niʻihau over other options, including Waikīkī and Pearl Harbor. By around 1875, Niʻihau's population consisted of about 350 Native Hawaiians, with 20,000 sheep. This era marked the end of the art of Hawaiian mat-weaving made famous by the people of Niʻihau. Makaloa (Cyperus laevigatus), a native sedge, used to grow on the edges of Niʻihau's three intermittent lakes. The stems were harvested and used to weave moena makaloa (mats), considered the "finest sleeping mats in Polynesia". The mats were valued by aliʻi and foreign visitors alike, but by the end of the 19th century, Hawaiians had stopped weaving makaloa due to changes in population, culture, economics, and the environment.

In 1915, Sinclair's grandson Aubrey Robinson closed the island to most visitors. Even relatives of the inhabitants could visit only by special permission. Upon Aubrey's death in 1939 the island passed to his son Aylmer, and in 1968 to Aylmer's youngest brother Lester. Upon Lester's wife Helen's death, the island passed to his sons Bruce Robinson and Keith Robinson, the current co-owners. (See Sinclair-Robinson family tree)

The Robinson family has attracted controversy over the strict rules they have imposed on the island’s inhabitants, largely enforced by Bruce Robinson’s wife, Leiana Robinson. The rules include a ban on alcohol and cigarettes, being prohibited from talking about Ni’ihau to the media, a permanent ban from the island if a resident leaves for an extended amount of time, and a ban on long hair and beards for men. The island lacks electricity and running water.

== The Niʻihau incident ==
Niʻihau was the site of an event not long after the attack on Pearl Harbor that has come to be known as the Niʻihau incident (or the Battle of Niʻihau). On December 7, 1941, a Japanese pilot whose Zero had been hit crash-landed on the island hoping to rendezvous with a rescue submarine. The pilot was apprehended and later escaped with the assistance of local Japanese residents, but he was killed shortly afterwards.

Despite its self-imposed isolation, Niʻihau has a long-standing relationship with the U.S. military dating from 1924. There is a small Navy installation on the island. No military personnel are permanently stationed there, but the U.S. military has used the island for training special operations units, which included hiring Hawaiians who live on Niʻihau as "enemy" trackers.

== Society ==
=== Politics ===
The island of Niʻihau was considered as a possible location for the United Nations headquarters in 1944 by Franklin D. Roosevelt, who had visited Hawaii in 1934. Under Cordell Hull, Roosevelt's Secretary of State, the State Department seriously studied the proposal.

United States presidential election results for Niʻihau
Year	Republican		Democratic		Third party(ies)	
Year	No.	%	No.	%	No.	%
2004	39	97.50%	0	0.00%	1	2.50%
2008	35	87.50%	4	10.00%	1	2.50%
2012	27	44.26%	29	47.54%	5	8.20%
2016	20	58.82%	10	29.41%	4	11.76%
2020	43	100.00%	0	0.00%	0	0.00%
2024	22	95.65%	1	4.35%	0	0.00%

The island is a stronghold for the Republican Party, in contrast to the rest of the state which generally votes Democratic. In 2004, President George W. Bush received all but one of the 40 votes cast on the island. The remaining vote was cast for Green Party nominee David Cobb. Fifty-one registered voters did not cast ballots. In 2006, Dan Akaka received 60% of votes in the 2006 Senate election to Cynthia Thielen's 36%. In 2008, Niʻihau's precinct was one of only three of Hawaiʻi's 538 precincts to support John McCain over Barack Obama.

=== Population ===
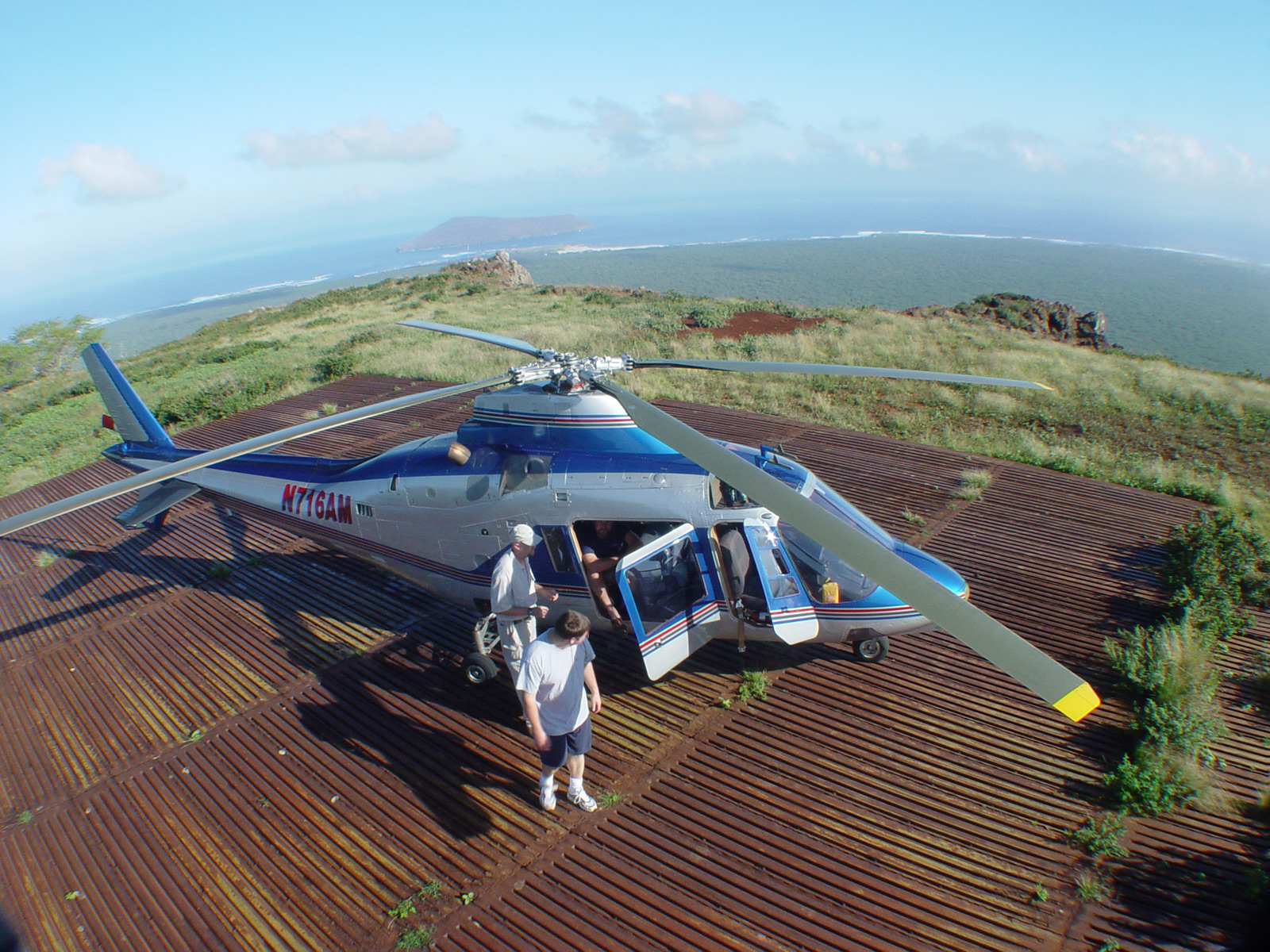
Navy contractors from PMRF arrive at Paniau Ridge on Niʻihau in an Agusta A109 helicopter. The seabird sanctuary island of Lehua can be seen in the background.

The 2010 census states that there were 170 people living on the island. However, witness accounts estimate that the population actually ranges between 35 and 50 people. Some support themselves largely by subsistence fishing and farming, while others depend on welfare. All residents live rent-free, and meat is free. Niʻihau has no telephone services and no paved roads. Horses are the main form of transportation; bicycles are also used. There are no power lines; solar power provides all electricity. There is no plumbing or running water on the island. Water comes from rainwater catchment. The Robinson family established most of these conditions. There is no hotel, and barges deliver groceries from Kauaʻi, often purchased by relatives, with free shipping.

Residents generally speak the Niʻihau dialect of Hawaiian as their first language, in part encouraged by terms in the original purchase contract which obligated the new owners to help preserve Hawaiian culture and tradition. The Niʻihau dialect differs from modern standard Hawaiian in that, for example, [t] and [ɾ] are the most common realizations of the phonemes /k/ and /l/, respectively. Niʻihau is the only island where Hawaiian is spoken as a primary language. Oral tradition maintains that the Niʻihau dialect is closer to the Hawaiian register spoken during the time of contact with Europeans; there is linguistic evidence to support this claim, such as the pronunciation of k as /t/. English is the second language.

Some residents have radio and television sets, although limited reception effectively limits the latter to watching pre-recorded media. Niʻihau is subject to regular droughts that occasionally force the population to evacuate to Kauaʻi temporarily, until rainfall replenishes their water supply. Residents commonly also commute to Kauaʻi for work, medical care, or school, and many of them call both islands home. To avoid a long boat ride, the island's owners maintain an Agusta A109 helicopter for emergencies and for transporting Navy contractors and residents to and from Kauaʻi. Helicopter tours and safaris help offset the costs of this service.

A form of ipu art is known to have developed solely on the island of Niʻihau. In this method, after a design is carved in the skin of a fresh gourd, it is filled with dye which, after several weeks, changes the color of the uncarved portions of the surface where the skin is intact. Hawaiian music plays a central role on the island, with a cappella singers making use of only two or three tones and changing rhythms. Ukulele and guitar playing is nearly ubiquitous among the islanders, and there are three separate styles of slack-key music, with an older style originating from Kohala.

=== Education ===
The Hawaii Department of Education operates the Niʻihau School, a K–12 school. Academic subjects and computer literacy are combined with teaching students to "thrive from the land". The school is powered entirely by solar power. The number of students varies from 25 to 50 since families often travel between Niʻihau and Kauaʻi. Schoolchildren may stay with relatives in west Kauaʻi, where they attend one of two Niʻihau-focused public charter schools. At the Ke Kula Niʻihau o Kekaha school, students speak primarily the Niʻihau dialect through the early elementary grades, and then Hawaiian and English through grade 12. The school has a digital recording and video system, which helps to preserve and teach traditional Niʻihau and Hawaiian culture. At the other west Kauaʻi school, Kula Aupuni Niʻihau a Kahelelani Aloha (KANAKA), English is used in all grades, while still supporting the Niʻihau dialect. Both schools foster the culture, values, and spirituality of Niʻihau. Efforts to establish KANAKA began in 1993 and its current version was established in 1999.

== Economy ==
Approximately 80% of Niʻihau's income comes from a small Navy installation atop 1,300-foot-high cliffs. Remote-controlled tracking devices are used for testing and training with Kaua'i's Pacific Missile Range Facility. Modern missile defense tests are conducted at the site for the U.S. and its allies. The installation brings in millions of dollars a year, and provides the island with a stable economic base without the complexity of tourism or industrial development.

The sale of shells and shell jewelry is an additional source of income. Its beaches are known for their pūpū, tiny shells that wash onto shore during winter months. Species used for shell leis includes momi (Euplica varians), laiki or rice shells (Mitrella margarita) and kahelelani (Leptothyra verruca). The shells and jewelry are so popular that Governor Linda Lingle signed a bill in 2004 to protect lei pūpū o Niʻihau (Niʻihau shell leis) from counterfeiting. A single, intricate Niʻihau shell lei can sell for thousands of dollars.

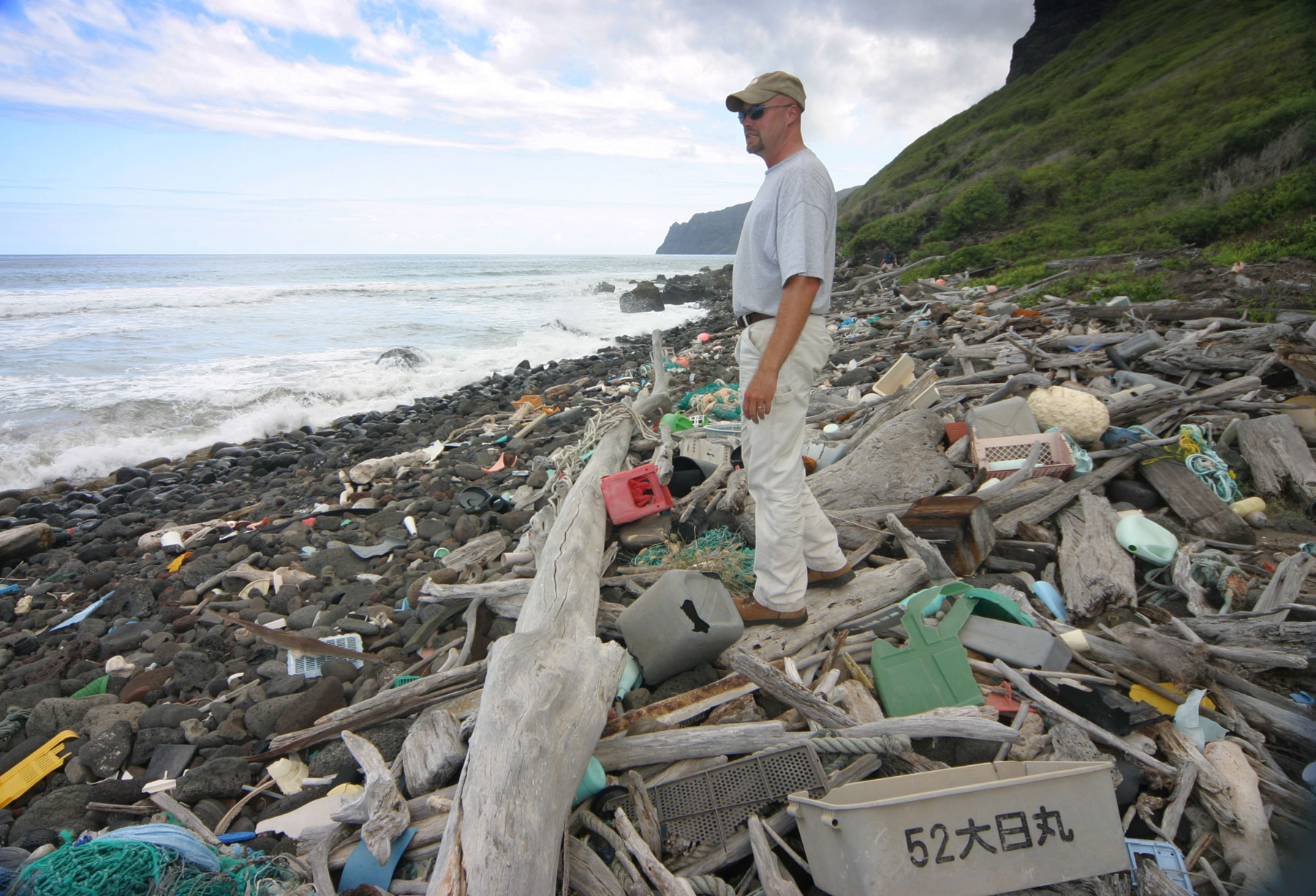
Trash deposited by the ocean on a windward Niʻihau beach

Many residents of Niʻihau were once employees of Niʻihau Ranch, farming cattle and sheep until the Robinsons shut down the operation in 1999. It had not been profitable for most of the 20th century. Honey cultivation was also no longer viable by 1999. Kiawe charcoal was once a large-scale export, but aggressive Mexican price competition ended that as well. Mullet farming has been popular on Niʻihau, with ponds and lakes stocked with baby mullet, which reach 9–10 pounds (4.1–4.5 kg) apiece before being harvested and sold on Kauaʻi and Oʻahu.

As of 2010, Bruce Robinson, Niʻihau's co-owner, was considering new ventures on the island. Considered possibilities included JP-8 (jet fuel) generation by the lignocellulose process; increased military activity, including a possible runway; and windmill energy production. Stating his opposition to possible environmental impact, Robinson has declined offers to purchase sand from Niʻihau's beaches.

=== Tourism ===
Niʻihau's owners have offered half-day helicopter and beach tours of the island since 1986 or 1987, although contact with residents is avoided and no accommodation exists. Since 1992, hunting safaris provide income from tourists who pay to visit the island to hunt eland, aoudad, and oryx, as well as wild sheep and boars. Any meat the hunters do not take with them is given to the village.

== In popular culture ==
- The Niʻihau incident is portrayed in the 2019 film Enemy Within.
- Niʻihau is featured in the Lilo & Stitch: The Series episode "Splodyhead", where the cast is stranded on the island while trying to catch the titular explosive experiment.
- In the 2007 sci-fi real time strategy game Supreme Commander, Niʻihau is the setting of the final UEF Mission. The island also appears in the final mission of the video game Forged Alliance.
- Niʻihau is featured as an accessible island in the racing game The Crew Motorfest through the "Secrets of Niʻihau" DLC in collaboration with Tomb Raider.

== Bibliography ==
- Beekman, Allan (1995) [1982]. The Niihau Incident. Honolulu, HI: Heritage Press of Pacific. ISBN 0-9609132-0-3.
- Fisher, Harvey I. (January–February 1951). "The Avifauna of Niihau Island, Hawaiian Archipelago". The Condor. 53 (1). Cooper Ornithological Society: 31–42. doi:10.2307/1364585. ISSN 0010-5422. JSTOR 1364585.
- Macdonald, Gordon A.; Agatin T. Abbott; Frank L. Peterson (1983) [1970]. Volcanoes in the Sea: The Geology of Hawaii (2nd ed.). Honolulu: University of Hawaii Press. ISBN 0-8248-0832-0.
- Mitchell, C.; C. Ogura; D.W. Meadows; A. Kane; L. Strommer; S. Fretz; D. Leonard; A. McClung (October 1, 2005). "Chapter 6: Island Conservation Needs – Niʻihau" (PDF). Hawaii's Comprehensive Wildlife Conservation Strategy. Final. Department of Land and Natural Resources. Archived from the original (PDF) on June 16, 2011.
- Morgan, Joseph R. (1996). "Kaua'i and Ni'ihau". Hawai'i: A Unique Geography. The Bess Press. ISBN 1-57306-021-6.
- Nordyke, Eleanor C. (1989). The Peopling of Hawaiʻi. University of Hawaii Press. ISBN 0-8248-1191-7.
- Shearer, Barbara Smith (2002). State Names, Seals, Flags, and Symbols: A Historical Guide (3 ed.). Greenwood Publishing Group. ISBN 978-0-313-31534-3.
- Sommer, Anthony (May 14, 1999). "Change dawning on 'Forbidden Island': The Robinson family and native Hawaiians are turning to the military and tourism for income / NIIHAU: Income from outside sources to infringe on isle's isolation". Niihau: Opening Up. Honolulu Star-Bulletin. pp. A-1, A-4. NewsBank 1295E4CB04858438. Newspapers.com 273452811, 273452850. ProQuest 412249805.
- Tabrah, Ruth M. (1987). Niʻihau, the last Hawaiian island. Press Pacifica. ISBN 0-916630-59-5.
- Tava, Rerioterai; Keale, Moses K. (1998). Niihau, the traditions of a Hawaiian island. Mutual Publishing. ISBN 0-935180-80-X. Archived from the original on May 24, 2013.
- Wichman, Juliet Rice; St. John, Harold (1990). A Chronicle and Flora of Niihau. National Tropical Botanical Garden. ISBN 0-915809-14-1.
