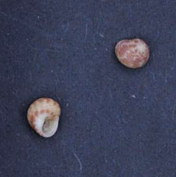
- Two shells of Collonista verruca (museum specimens at Naturalis Biodiversity Center)

Scientific classification
- Kingdom: Animalia
- Phylum: Mollusca
- Class: Gastropoda
- Subclass: Vetigastropoda
- Order: Trochida
- Family: Colloniidae
- Genus: Collonista
- Species: C. verruca

Binomial name
- Collonista verruca (Gould, 1845)

Synonyms
- Leptothyra costata Pease, W.H., 1869; Leptothyra verruca (Gould, 1845); Leptothyra verruca manti Pilsbry, 1921; Trochus (Collonia) verruca Gould, 1845; Trochus verruca Gould, 1845 (original combination)

= Collonista verruca =

Species of gastropod

Collonista verruca is a species of sea snail, a marine gastropod mollusc in the family Colloniidae.

== Description ==
The size of the shell attains 4 mm. The small, solid shell has a short ovate-conic shape. it is imperforate or narrowly umbilicate. It is white with numerous revolving series of red or brown tessellations. The five whorls are spirally lirate. The lira is largest at the middle of the whorl and causes sometimes a slight carina there. The body whorl is slightly but abruptly deflected anteriorly. The circular aperture is white. The white columella is arcuate and wide but not dentate below. The base of the shell has a minute internal denticle. Some specimens are almost entirely red; others are white, with red spots at the periphery. There is some variation in form, also, and in the prominence of the spiral riblets.

== Cultural significance ==
The shells of this species, known in Niʻihau as kahelelaniʻulaʻula, are used to make leis. The species is one of Hawaii's nine state snails.
