= Kahelelani =

Kahelelani (born in the late 17th century) was the first ali'i of the island of Niʻihau, Hawaii; he was the son of High Chief Kanehuanui and High Chiefess Kaluahineloa. The small shells used in Ni'ihau lei are named after him.

Kahelelani came from the royal Kaʻulamakaʻula line ("the red bloodline"). Kahelelani's royal lineage and descendants rest in the Ka’iwiahuʻulaonaaliʻi bloodline, who today live within the Kanahele ʻohana.
