= Mount Pānīʻau =

Hawaiian shield volcano

Coordinates: 21°56′24″N 160°5′24″W

Mount Pānīʻau is a shield volcano located on the Hawaiian island of Niʻihau. It has an elevation of 1,289 feet (393 meters), thus making it Niʻihau's highest point.

In addition to forming the island of Niʻihau, one of its tuff cones created the small island of Lehua, located 0.7 miles (1.1 km) north of Niʻihau, due west of Kauai.
