= Niʻihau incident =

1941 Japanese crash landing in Hawaii, US

Coordinates: 21.8653°N 160.2235°W

- Part of the Pacific War during World War II
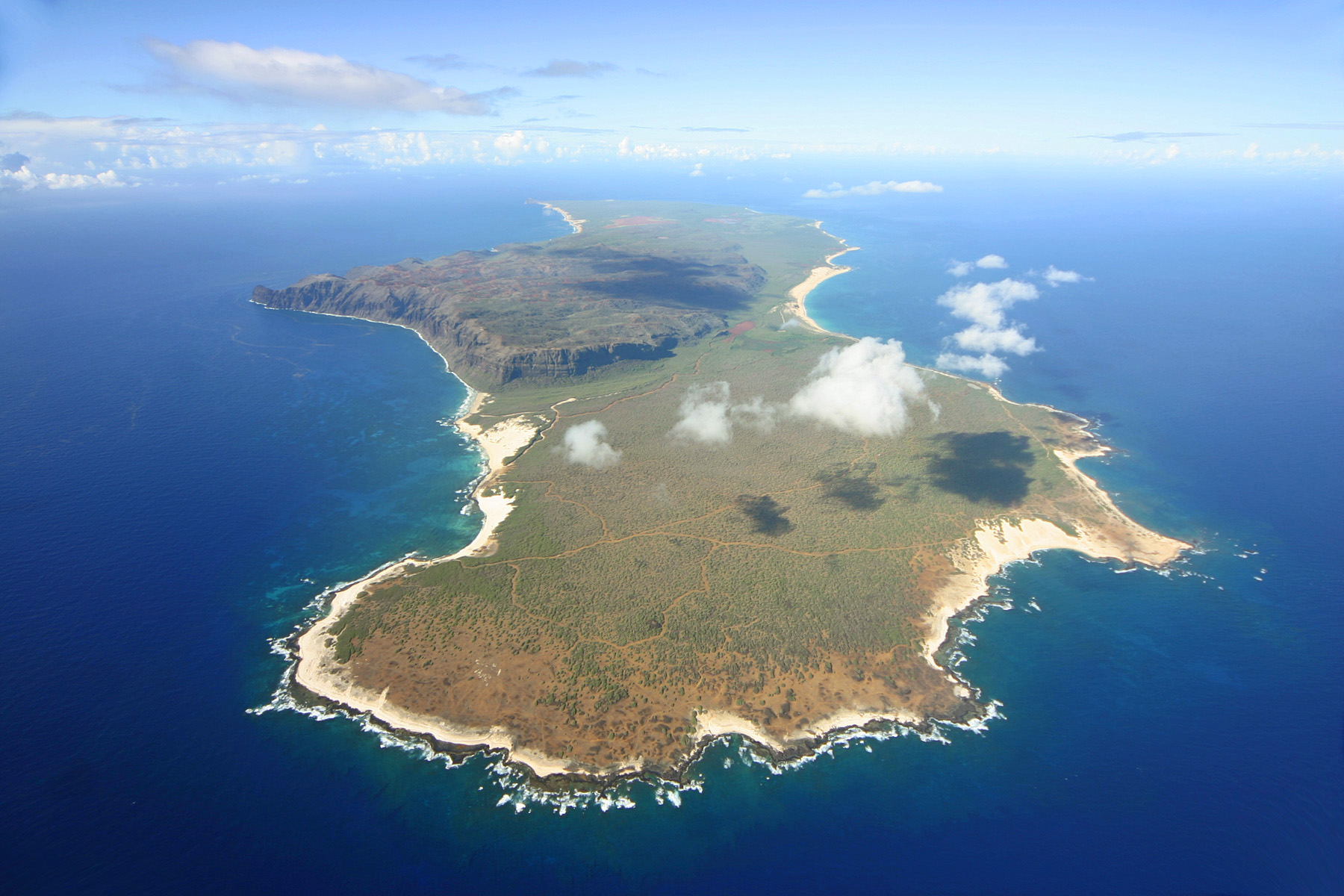
- Aerial view of Niʻihau looking southwestward from the north, where the incident took place
- Date: December 7–13, 1941
- Location: Niʻihau, Hawaii Territory, U.S.
- Result: See § Conclusion

Parties
Native Hawaiians	Imperial Japanese Navy Air Service; Japanese Hawaiians

Lead figures
Hawila Kaleohano; Ben Kanahele (WIA); Ella Kanahele; Kaahakila Kalimahuluhulu	Shigenori Nishikaichi †; Yoshio Harada ‡‡; Irene Harada; Ishimatsu Shintani

Number
5 civilian guards	1 airman; 3 civilians

Casualties and losses
1 injured	2 dead; 2 detained

The Niʻihau incident occurred on December 7–13, 1941, when the Imperial Japanese Navy Air Service pilot Shigenori Nishikaichi (西開地 重徳, Nishikaichi Shigenori) crash-landed on the Hawaiian island of Niʻihau after participating in the attack on Pearl Harbor. The Imperial Japanese Navy had mistakenly designated Niʻihau as an uninhabited island for damaged aircraft to land and await rescue.

Native Hawaiians, as yet unaware of the Pearl Harbor attack, treated Nishikaichi as a guest but took the precaution of removing his weapons. They brought a resident who had been born in Japan to interpret. That night, the Hawaiians learned of the attack and apprehended Nishikaichi. They allowed him to stay with the Haradas, two of the only three residents of Japanese descent, but posted guards.

Nishikaichi told the Haradas about the attack and the two agreed to help him. Nishikaichi and Yoshio Harada overcame a guard and escaped to destroy Nishikaichi's plane and papers, then took Niihauans Benehakaka "Ben" Kanahele and his wife Kealoha "Ella" Kanahele prisoner. The Kanaheles overcame the guard and killed Nishikaichi. Ben Kanahele was wounded in the process, and one of Nishikaichi's collaborators, Yoshio Harada, committed suicide. Ben Kanahele was decorated for his action because he was wounded. Ella Kanahele, who bashed Nishikaichi's head with a rock before Ben slit his throat, received no official recognition.

== Background ==
Niʻihau, the westernmost and second smallest of the primary Hawaiian Islands, has been privately owned by the Robinsons, a white kamaʻāina family, since 1864. At the time of the incident, it had 136 inhabitants, almost all of whom were Native Hawaiians whose first language was Hawaiian. In 1941, the owner was Aylmer Robinson, a Harvard University graduate who was fluent in Hawaiian. Robinson ran the island without interference from any government authority, and, although he lived on the nearby island of Kauaʻi, he made weekly visits by boat to Niʻihau. The island was accessible only with Robinson’s permission, which was almost never given except to friends or relatives of Niihauans. The handful of non-Native residents included three of Japanese ancestry: Ishimatsu Shintani, a first-generation immigrant from Japan (Issei) and Hawaiian-born Nisei Yoshio Harada and his wife Irene Harada, all of whom were involved in the incident.

Prior to the Pearl Harbor attack, the Imperial Japanese Navy had designated Niʻihau, mistakenly believed to be uninhabited, as a location for aircraft damaged in the attack to land. Pilots were told they could wait on the island until they were rescued by submarine.

== Incident ==
=== Nishikaichi crash-lands ===
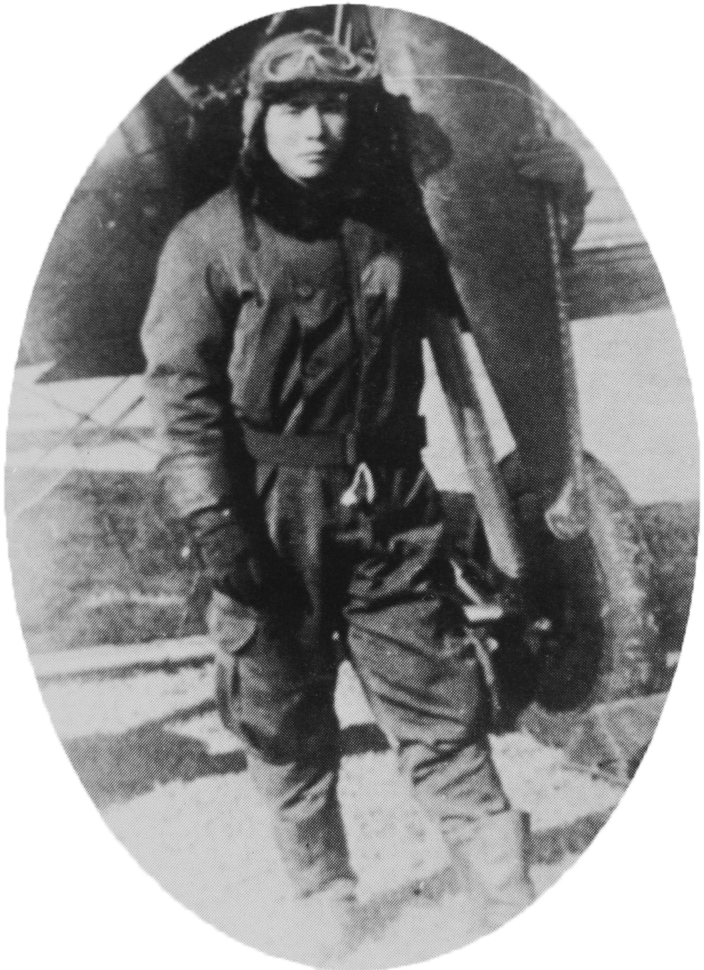
Shigenori Nishikaichi, the pilot who became the center of the Niʻihau incident

On December 7th, 1941, Airman First Class Shigenori Nishikaichi, who had taken part in the second wave of the Pearl Harbor attack, crash-landed his battle-damaged aircraft, an A6M2 Zero "B11-120", from the carrier Hiryu, in a Ni'ihau field near where Hawila Kaleohano, a native Hawaiian, was standing. Kaleohano was unaware of the attack at Pearl Harbor, but knew from newspapers that the relationship between the U.S. and Japan was poor because of disputes over Japanese expansionism and the resulting U.S. oil embargo on Japan. Recognizing Nishikaichi and his plane as Japanese, Kaleohano seized Nishikaichi's pistol and papers before Nishikaichi could react. He and the other Hawaiians who gathered about treated Nishikaichi with courtesy and traditional Hawaiian hospitality, and held a party for him later that afternoon. However, the Hawaiians could not understand Nishikaichi, who spoke limited English. They sent for issei Ishimatsu Shintani, who was married to a native Hawaiian, to translate.

Having been briefed on the situation beforehand and approaching the task with distaste, Shintani exchanged just a few words with Nishikaichi and departed without explanation. The puzzled Hawaiians then sent for Yoshio Harada, who was born in Hawaii of Japanese ancestry, and his wife Irene (born Umeno Tanaka on Kauai), who constituted the remainder of the Niʻihau population of Japanese ancestry. Nishikaichi informed Harada of the attack on Pearl Harbor, and Harada chose not to share the information with the non-Japanese natives. Nishikaichi desperately wanted his papers returned, as he had been instructed not to let them fall into American hands, but Kaleohano refused to return them. The Haradas decided to help Nishikaichi retrieve his papers and escape.

=== News of the Pearl Harbor attack ===
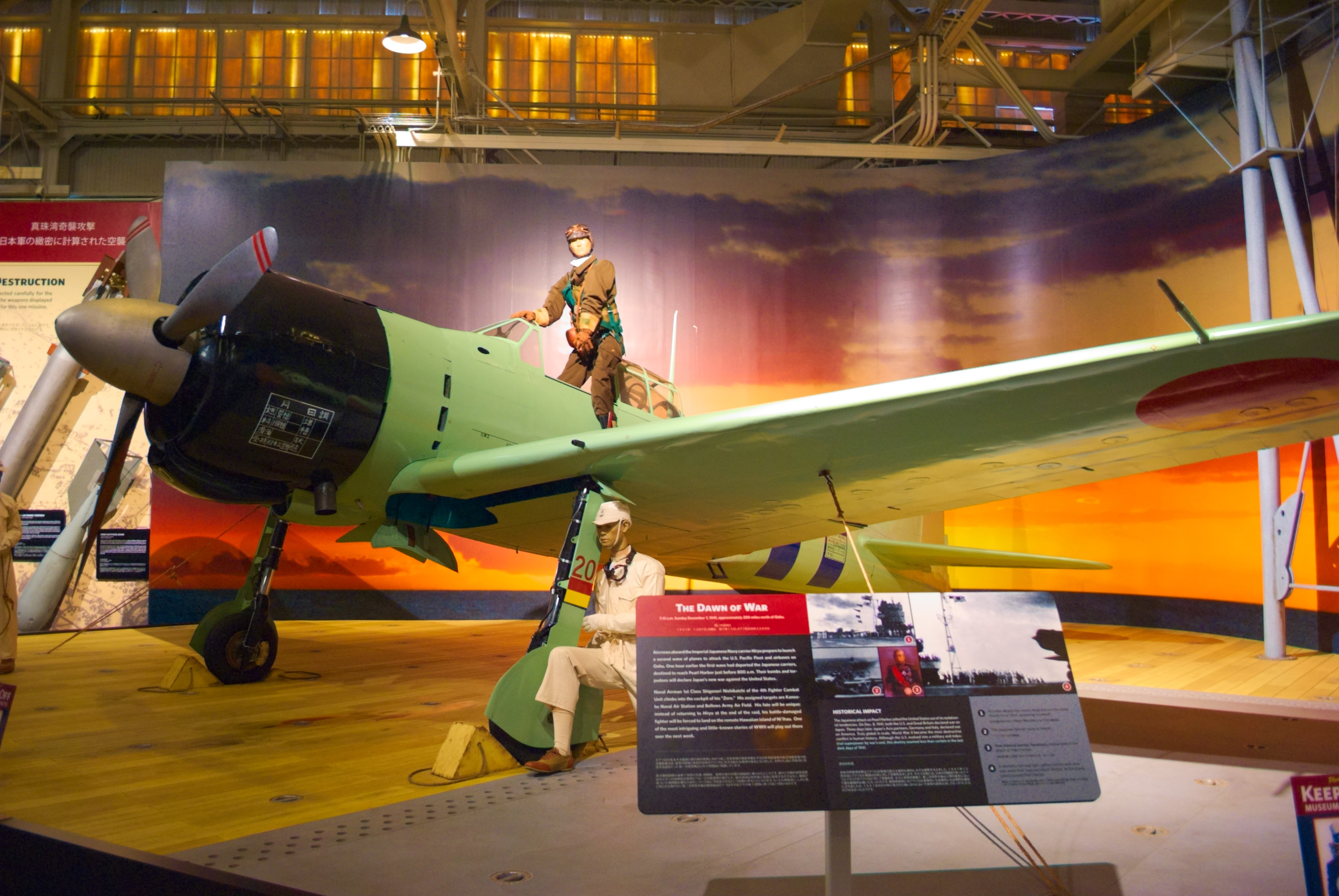
A6M Zero in the markings of the aircraft flown by Nishikaichi on display at the Pacific Aviation Museum

Niʻihau had neither electricity nor telephones, but later that night, the Hawaiians heard a radio report about the Pearl Harbor attack on a battery-operated radio. They confronted Nishikaichi, and this time Harada translated what was said about the attack. The owner of the island, Aylmer Robinson, was scheduled to arrive on his regular weekly trip from Kauaʻi, a much larger island just 17 miles (27 km) away, the next morning. It was decided that Nishikaichi would return to Kauaʻi with Robinson.

However, Robinson could not reach Niʻihau because the American military had instituted a ban on boat traffic within the islands soon after the attack. The Niʻihauans did not know of the ban. Nishikaichi was permitted to stay with the Haradas, but with a contingent of five guards. There was now ample opportunity for the Haradas to converse with Nishikaichi.

On December 12, Shintani approached Kaleohano privately on behalf of Harada and Nishikaichi. He offered him a bribe of ¥200 for Nishikaichi's papers, but Kaleohano again refused. Shintani fled into the woods to avoid reporting his failure. Yoshio Harada and Nishikaichi, not waiting for Shintani's return, attacked the lone guard who had been posted outside the Harada residence, while Irene Harada played music on a phonograph to disguise the sounds of the struggle. Three other guards were stationed to watch the Harada residence, but they were not present at the time of the attack. Harada and Nishikaichi locked the guard in a warehouse, where Harada acquired a shotgun and Nishikaichi's pistol that had been stored there. They proceeded to Kaleohano's house.

Having left Shintani just minutes before, Kaleohano was in his outhouse when he saw Harada and Nishikaichi approaching with the 16-year-old guard, whom they were prodding with a gun. With Kaleohano hiding in the outhouse, Harada and Nishikaichi turned their attention to the nearby plane. Kaleohano ran from the outhouse as Harada and Nishikaichi fired at him, and he alerted the residents of the nearby village, warning them to evacuate, but they were skeptical regarding Kaleohano's news. However, when the captive guard escaped and reached the village, the residents fled to caves, thickets and distant beaches.

=== Kaleohano's midnight run ===
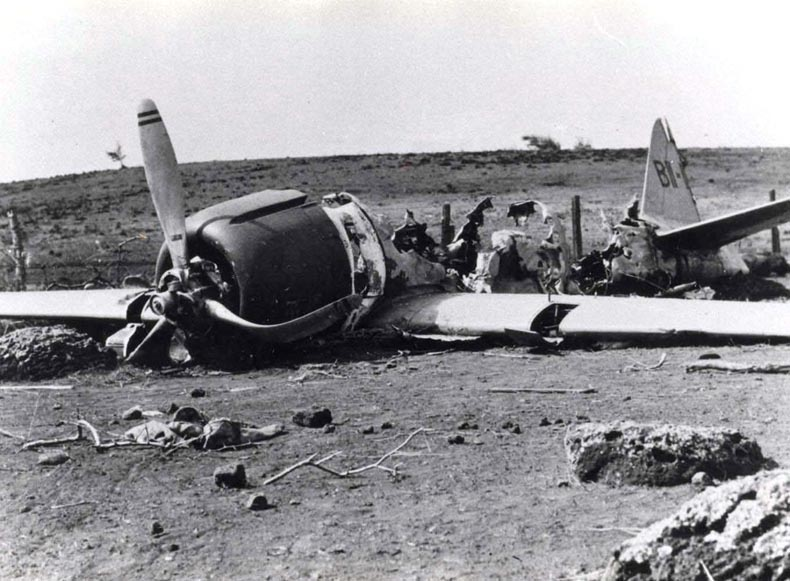
Remains of Nishikaichi's Zero after having been burned by Nishikaichi on December 13, 1941

Robinson was aware that there was trouble on Niʻihau because the Niihauans had flashed signals toward Kauaʻi with kerosene lanterns and reflectors. Nishikaichi unsuccessfully attempted to make contact with the Japanese military using the downed aircraft's radio. With the help of Harada and one of their Hawaiian captives, Nishikaichi removed at least one of the plane's two 7.7 mm machine guns with some ammunition, torched the plane, and proceeded to Kaleohano's house, setting it ablaze in the early morning hours in a final effort to destroy Nishikaichi's papers, which included maps, radio codes, and Pearl Harbor attack plans.

=== Conclusion ===
During the night, Niʻihau resident Kaahakila Kalimahuluhulu, known as Kalima, had also been taken captive. He was released to help in the search for Kaleohano, who had escaped with Nishikaichi's papers. Instead, Kalima enlisted his friend Benehakaka "Ben" Kanahele to sneak back in the darkness to steal the machine guns and ammunition. That morning, Saturday, December 13, Harada and Nishikaichi captured Kanahele and his wife Kealoha "Ella" Kanahele. They ordered Kanahele to find Kaleohano, keeping Ella as a hostage. Kanahele knew that Kaleohano was rowing toward Kauaʻi with five others but pretended to look for him. He soon became concerned about Ella and returned to her. Nishikaichi realized that he was being deceived. Harada told Kanahele that Nishikaichi would kill him and everyone in the village if Kaleohano was not found.

Kanahele and his wife, taking advantage of the fatigue and discouragement of his two captors, leapt at them as Nishikaichi handed the shotgun to Harada. When Nishikaichi pulled his pistol out of his boot, Ella Kanahele grabbed his arm and brought it down. Harada pulled her off Nishikaichi, who then shot Ben Kanahele three times: in the groin, stomach and upper leg. However, Kanahele was still able to pick up Nishikaichi and hurl him into a stone wall, knocking him unconscious. Ella Kanahele then killed the Japanese pilot by bludgeoning his head with a rock. Harada then killed himself with the shotgun.

After the incident, Ella Kanahele went for help, dropping the shotgun and the pistol on the way. (About five years later, a flood washed the shotgun into a wall where it was found by islanders. The pistol and one of the machine guns were never found.) Ben Kanahele was taken to Waimea Hospital on Kauaʻi to recuperate. He was awarded the Medal for Merit and the Purple Heart in 1945, but Ella did not receive any official recognition.

The next afternoon, December 14, the military authorities, the six Hawaiians who had rowed to Kauaʻi, and Robinson, all arrived together. Nishikaichi's papers (containing local maps, money, and things needed if forced down) were turned over, and the crashed plane was studied.

=== Post-incident ===
Irene Harada and Ishimatsu Shintani were taken into custody. Shintani was sent to an internment camp and later rejoined his family on Niʻihau, where he attained U.S. citizenship in 1960.

Irene Harada was imprisoned for 31 months until her release in June 1944. She was not charged with any crimes resulting from the incident. She maintained her innocence, but added in a 1992 interview with Japanese television that she felt sorry for Nishikaichi and wanted to help him. She moved to the island of Kauaʻi. Mitsuo Fuchida, a naval commander during the attack on Pearl Harbor and later a Christian evangelist who settled in the U.S., visited her after his short trip to Niʻihau.

== Legacy ==
The event was so widely known about in America that the December 1942 issue of Reader's Digest told an exaggerated tale of the America's defense by “full-blooded descendants of ancient Hawaiian warriors.” Composer R. Alex Anderson was inspired by the incident to compose "They Couldn't Take Niihau, Nohow!" It was played on August 15, 1945, when Kanahele was decorated for his actions in Honolulu.

Historian Gordon Prange notes that "the rapidity with which the three resident Japanese went over to Nishikaichi's cause" troubled the Hawaiians and added: "The more pessimistic among them cited the Niʻihau incident as proof that no one could trust any Japanese, even if an American citizen, not to go over to Japan if it appeared expedient." Novelist William Hallstead argues that the Niʻihau incident influenced decisions leading to the Japanese American internment on the continental United States. According to Hallstead, the behavior of Shintani and the Haradas was included in an official Navy report dated January 26, 1942. The report's author Navy Lieutenant C. B. Baldwin wrote: "The fact that the two Niʻihau Japanese who had previously shown no anti-American tendencies went to the aid of the pilot when Japanese domination of the island seemed possible, indicate[s] [the] likelihood that Japanese residents previously believed loyal to the United States may aid Japan if further Japanese attacks appear successful."

Despite this, the Japanese population in Hawaii was largely spared from mass internment throughout the war because of economic concerns (more than one-third of Hawaii's total population were Japanese-Americans who comprised "over 90 percent of the carpenters, nearly all of the transportation workers, and a significant portion of the agricultural laborers"). However, Hawaii was subjected to martial law and lookouts were established.

=== Memorial ===
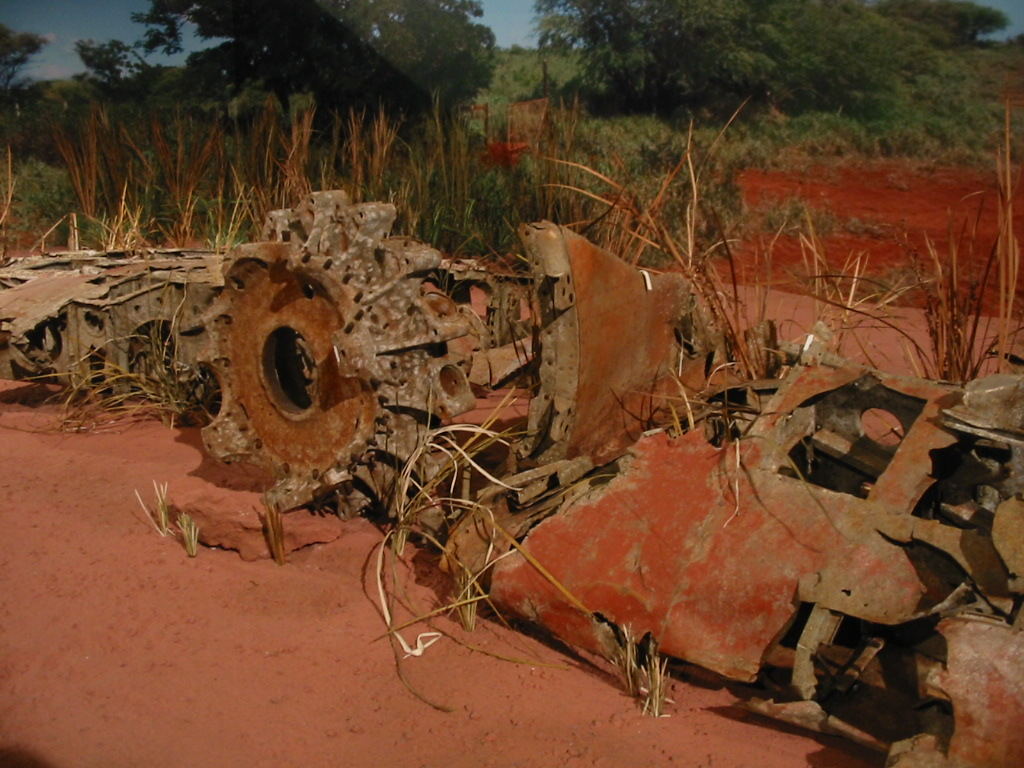
Rusted parts of the Niihau Zero as displayed at the Pacific Aviation Museum Pearl Harbor

The coastal town of Hashihama, Imabari, Ehime Prefecture, Japan erected a 12-foot (3.7 m) granite cenotaph in Nishikaichi's honor when it was still believed that he had perished on the day of the attack, December 7, 1941. For many years, Nishikaichi's remains were those of an unknown Japanese soldier, and it was not until 1956 that the circumstances of his death were revealed to his family, and they claimed his ashes. Engraved on the column is what was believed at the time: "Having expended every effort, he achieved the greatest honor of all by dying a soldier's death in battle, destroying both himself and his beloved plane... His meritorious deed will live forever." In June 2017, Nishikaichi's nafuda, a set of seven wooden sticks that carried the names of Nishikaichi's colleagues, the identifying markings of his Zero and his administrative command, was returned to his family in Japan.

=== Museum exhibit and controversy ===
The remains of Nishikaichi's Zero and those of the tractor that he used to travel to the boat landing are on permanent display at the Pacific Aviation Museum Pearl Harbor, now known as the Pearl Harbor Aviation Museum, on Ford Island in Pearl Harbor. A Japanese-American group in Hawaii criticized the original design of the museum display. Threatening to have federal funds withheld, they demanded that the museum remove mention of the Haradas from the display. The Robinson family, who had donated the aircraft and tractor pieces based on what they were told about how the display would read, was unhappy with the censorship of the information about the Haradas. The exhibit mentions Yoshio Harada's suicide, but not his wife.

=== In popular culture ===
A film entitled Enemy Within was released in theaters on April 19, 2019. Joe Naufahu stars as Ben Kanahele.

The 2006 novel East Wind, Rain by Caroline Paul also tells the story of the incident.
