= Mary Kawena Pukui =

Hawaiian scholar, author, composer, hula expert and educator

- Born: Mary Abigail Pukui; 20 April 1895; Kaʻū, Island of Hawaiʻi, Republic of Hawaii
- Died: 21 May 1986 (aged 91)
- Occupations: Scholar, dancer, composer, educator

Mary Abigail Kawenaʻulaokalaniahiʻiakaikapoliopele Naleilehuaapele Wiggin Pukui (20 April 1895 – 21 May 1986), known as Kawena, was a Hawaiian scholar, author, composer, hula expert, and educator.

== Life ==
Pukui was born on April 20, 1895, in her grandmother's home, named Hale Ola, in Haniumalu, Kaʻū, on Hawaiʻi Island, to Henry Nathaniel Wiggin (originally from Salem, Massachusetts, of a distinguished shipping family descended from Massachusetts Bay Colony governor Simon Bradstreet and his wife, the poet Anne Bradstreet) and Mary Paʻahana Kanakaʻole, descendant of a long line of kahuna (priests) going back centuries. Pukui's maternal grandmother, Naliʻipoʻaimoku, was a kahuna laʻau lapaʻau (medicinal expert) and kahuna pale keiki (midwife) and a hula dancer in Queen Emma's court. She had delivered the child, and asked Pukui's parents for the child to raise in the traditional way, and her request was granted. Kawena was born into the Fire Clan of Kaʻū. Kawena and her grandmother were inseparable, and the child was taught many things she needed to know. Upon the death of her grandmother, Kawena returned to live with her parents. Her mother continued her education in things Hawaiian and her father, who spoke Hawaiian fluently, spoke to her in English and taught her of his New England heritage.

Pukui was educated in the Hawaiian Mission Academy, and taught Hawaiiana at Punahou School. Pukui was fluent in the Hawaiian language, and from the age of fifteen collected and translated folk tales, proverbs and sayings. She worked at the Bernice P. Bishop Museum from 1938 to 1961 as an ethnological assistant and translator. She also taught Hawaiian to several scholars and served as an informant for numerous anthropologists. She published more than 50 scholarly works. Pukui is the co-author of the definitive Hawaiian-English Dictionary (1957, revised 1986), Place Names of Hawaii (1974), and The Echo of Our Song (1974), a translation of old chants and songs. Her book, ʻŌlelo Noʻeau, contains nearly 3,000 examples of Hawaiian proverbs and poetical sayings, translated and annotated. The two-volume set Nānā i ke Kumu, Look to the Source, is a valuable resource on Hawaiian customs and traditions.

In addition to her published works, Pukui's knowledge was also preserved in her notes, oral histories, hundreds of audiotape recordings from the 1950s and 1960s, and a few film clips, all collected in the Bishop Museum. She is often credited with making the Hawaiian Renaissance of the 1970s possible.

She was named a "Living Treasure of Hawaiʻi" by the Honpa Hongwanji Mission of Hawaiʻi in 1977. In 1995, she was inducted into the Hawaiian Music Hall of Fame. In March 2017, Hawaiʻi Magazine ranked her among a list of the most influential women in Hawaiian history.

== Bibliography (selected) ==
In order of first publication:

- 1933: Hawaiian Folk Tales, Third Series
- 1934: Outline of Hawaiian Physical Therapeutics; with Handy and Livermore
- 1943: Introduction to the Hawaiian Language; with Henry P. Judd and John F. G. Stokes
- 1957: Hawaiian-English Dictionary; with Elbert (1957, rev. and enl. 1986) PDF Version
- 1957: The Polynesian Family System in Ka'u, Hawaii; with Handy, Edward Smith Craighill *Elbert, Samuel H; Pūkui, Mary Kawena (1999) [1957]. Hawaiian Dictionary : Hawaiian-English; English-Hawaiian (10th ed.). Honolulu, HI: University of Hawaii Press. ISBN 978-0-8248-0703-0. OCLC 247864894. PDF Version
- 1966: Pukui, Mary Kawena; Elbert, Samuel H; Mookini, Esther T. (1984) [1966 (suppl. to the 3d. ed. of the Hawaiian-English dictionary)]. Place Names of Hawaii (Rev. and enl. ed.). Honolulu, HI: University Press of Hawaii. ISBN 978-0-8248-0524-1. OCLC 740956610. PDF Version
- 1972: Nānā i ke Kumu, Look to the Source, Vol. 1 and Vol. 2; with Haertig and Lee. PDF Versions: Vol. 1 and Vol. 2
- 1972: Native Planters in Old Hawaii: Their Life, Lore, and Environment; with Edward Smith Craighill Handy; Elizabeth Green Handy. Honolulu: Bishop Museum Press; Revised edition (1991). ISBN 978-0-910240-11-6.
- 1974: Place Names of Hawaii; with Elbert and Mookini
- 1974: The Echo of Our Song: Chants and Poems of the Hawaiians
- 1979: Elbert, Samuel H; Pūkui, Mary Kawena (2001) [1979]. Hawaiian Grammar. Honolulu, HI: University of Hawaii Press. ISBN 978-0-8248-2489-1. OCLC 248939168. PDF Version
- 1980: Hula: Historical Perspectives; with Dorothy B. Barère and Marion Kelly
- 1983: ʻŌlelo No'eau: Hawaiian proverbs & poetical sayings Honolulu, Hawai'i: Bishop Museum Press ISBN 978-0-910240-92-5
  - Nā Wahine: Hawaiian proverbs and inspirational quotes celebrating women in Hawai'i. Honolulu: Mutual, 2002 ISBN 978-1-56647-596-9
  - Hula: Hawaiian proverbs and inspirational quotes celebrating hula in Hawai'i Honolulu: Mutual, 2003 ISBN 978-1-56647-638-6
- 1989: Pukui, Mary Kawena; Elbert, Samuel H; Mookini, Esther T. (1989). Pocket Place Names of Hawai'i. Honolulu, HI: University of Hawaii Press. ISBN 978-0-8248-1187-7. OCLC 18497487.
- 1990: Pukui, Mary Kawena; Elbert, Samuel H; Mookini, Esther T.; Nishizawa, Yū (1990). Hawaigo-Nihongo jiten ハワイ 語-日本語辞典 [Hawaiian-Japanese dictionary]. Honolulu, HI: University of Hawaii Press. ISBN 978-4-8051-0615-0. OCLC 23039378.
- 1992: Pukui, Mary Kawena; Elbert, Samuel H; Mookini, Esther T.; Nishizawa, Yu Mapuana (1992). New Pocket Hawaiian Dictionary with a Concise Grammars and Given Names in Hawaiian. Honolulu, HI: University of Hawaii Press. ISBN 978-0-8248-1392-5. OCLC 24064961.

»Partial preview of New Pocket Hawaiian Dictionary with a Concise Grammars and Given Names in Hawaiian. at WorldCat. OCLC 24064961.

- 1994: The Water of Kāne; and other legends of the Hawaiian Islands; retold by Caroline Curtis; rev. ed. Honolulu, Hawaiʻi: Kamehameha Schools Press ISBN 978-0-87336-020-3 PDF Version
- 1995: Handy Hawaiʻian Dictionary; with Judd and Stokes ISBN 978-1-56647-112-1
- 1996: Hawaiʻi Island Legends: Pikoi, Pele and Others; compiler; retold by Caroline Curtis. PDF Version
