= Samuel Hoyt Elbert =

American linguist (1907–1997)

Samuel H. Elbert
- Born: August 8, 1907; Des Moines, Iowa
- Died: May 14, 1997 (aged 89); Honolulu, Hawaii

Academic background
- Education: Grinnell College, University of Toulouse, Indiana University
- Influences: Mary Kawena Pukui

Academic work
- Main interests: Hawaiian and other Polynesian languages
- Notable works: Hawaiian Dictionary; Hawaiian Grammar
- Influenced: Torben Monberg

Samuel Hoyt Elbert (8 August 1907 – 14 May 1997) was an American linguist who made major contributions to Hawaiian and Polynesian lexicography and ethnography. Born on a farm in Des Moines, Iowa, to Hoyt Hugh Elbert and Ethelind (Swire) Elbert, Sam grew up riding horses, one of his favorite pastimes well into retirement. After graduating from Grinnell College with an A.B. in 1928, he earned a certificate in French at the University of Toulouse and traveled in Europe before returning to New York City, where he waited tables, clerked for a newspaper, reviewed books, and studied journalism at Columbia University. Wanderlust took him to French Polynesia, first to Tahiti and then to the Marquesas, where he quickly became proficient in Marquesan. In 1936, he went to work for the United States Geological Survey in Hawaiʻi. There he met researchers on Pacific languages and cultures at the Bishop Museum, chief among them Mary Kawena Pukui, from whom he learned Hawaiian and with whom he worked closely over a span of forty years. When war broke out in the Pacific, the U.S. Navy employed him as an intelligence officer studying the languages of strategically important islands. He was posted to Samoa in 1943, then to Micronesia, where he collected and published wordlists for several island languages.

After the war, encouraged by academics at the Bishop Museum and the University of Hawaiʻi, he studied at Yale and at Indiana University, where he earned a Ph.D. in folklore in 1950, writing his thesis on 'The Chief in Hawaiian Mythology'. He was hired by the University of Hawaiʻi in 1949, and taught classes in Hawaiian language and linguistics until he retired in 1972, introducing new teaching methods and new levels of rigor into Hawaiian language classes, which until then had a reputation for being easy.

In 1957, he began a longtime collaboration with the Danish scholar, Torben Monberg, on the Polynesian outliers of Rennell and Bellona in the Solomon Islands, making four trips to the islands. He spent a year in Denmark on a Fulbright scholarship in 1964–64 collaborating with Monberg on a monograph on the oral traditions of Rennell and Bellona. In 1988, he published a grammar of the language.

In 1972, he published a dictionary of the Puluwatese language followed by a grammar book of the language in 1974.

== Selected works ==
In order of first publication:

- Elbert, Samuel H; Pūkui, Mary Kawena (1999) [1957]. Hawaiian Dictionary : Hawaiian-English; English-Hawaiian (10th ed.). Honolulu, HI: University of Hawaii Press. ISBN 9780824807030. OCLC 247864894.
- ——; Monberg, Torben (1965). From the Two Canoes: Oral Traditions of Rennell and Bellona. Honolulu, HI: University of Hawaii Press in cooperation with the Danish National Museum, Copenhagen. ASIN B000MRLOWY. OCLC 651367269.
- —— (May 1970). Spoken Hawaiian. Illustrated by Jean Charlot. Honolulu, HI: University of Hawaii Press. ISBN 9780870222160. OCLC 837047024.
- ——; Māhoe, Noelani K. (1970). Na mele o Hawai'i nei=101 Hawaiian songs. Honolulu, HI: University of Hawaii Press. ISBN 9780870222191. OCLC 186504, 77288381.
- —— (1972). Puluwat Dictionary. Pacific linguistics, Series C. Canberra, Australia: Dep. of Linguistics, Research School of Pacific Studies, Australian National University. ISBN 9780858830820. OCLC 3207504.
- —— (1974). Puluwat Grammar. Pacific linguistics, Series B. Canberra, Australia: Dep. of Linguistics, Research School of Pacific Studies, Australian National University. ISBN 9780858831032. OCLC 1371164.
- ——; Pūkui, Mary Kawena (2001) [1979]. Hawaiian Grammar. Honolulu, HI: University of Hawaii Press. ISBN 9780824824891. OCLC 248939168.
- ——; Schütz, Albert J (1988). Echo of a Culture: A Grammar of Rennell and Bellona. Oceanic linguistics special publication. Honolulu, HI: University of Hawaii Press. ISBN 9780824812058. OCLC 17840476.
- Fornander, Abraham (1959). Elbert, Samuel H (ed.). Selections from Fornander's Hawaiian Antiquities and Folk-lore. Illustrated by Jean Charlot. Honolulu, HI: University of Hawaii Press. ISBN 9780870222139. OCLC 576157843.
- Pukui, Mary Kawena; Elbert, Samuel H; Mookini, Esther T. (1989). Pocket place names of Hawai'i. Honolulu, HI: University of Hawaii Press. ISBN 9780824811877. OCLC 18497487.
- Pukui, Mary Kawena; ——; Mookini, Esther T.; Nishizawa, Yū (1990). Hawaigo-Nihongo jiten ハワイ 語-日本語辞典 [Hawaiian-Japanese dictionary]. Honolulu, HI: University of Hawaii Press. ISBN 9784805106150. OCLC 23039378.
- Pukui, Mary Kawena; ——; Mookini, Esther T.; Nishizawa, Yu Mapuana (1992). New Pocket Hawaiian Dictionary with a Concise Grammars and Given Names in Hawaiian. Honolulu, HI: University of Hawaii Press. ISBN 9780824813925. OCLC 24064961.
- Pukui, Mary Kawena; ——; Mookini, Esther T. (1984) [1966 (suppl. to the 3d. ed. of the Hawaiian-English dictionary)]. Place names of Hawaii (Rev. and enl. ed.). Honolulu, HI: University Press of Hawaii. ISBN 9780824805241. OCLC 740956610.
