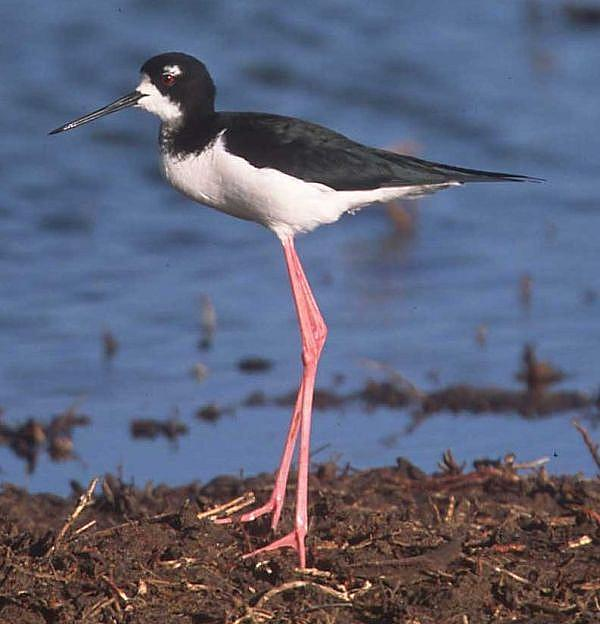

Conservation status
- Imperiled (NatureServe)

- Endangered (ESA)

Scientific classification
- Kingdom: Animalia
- Phylum: Chordata
- Class: Aves
- Order: Charadriiformes
- Family: Recurvirostridae
- Genus: Himantopus
- Species: H. mexicanus
- Subspecies: H. m. knudseni

Trinomial name
- Himantopus mexicanus knudseni Stejneger, 1887

Synonyms
- H. mexicanus knudseni; H. himantopus knudseni

= Hawaiian stilt =

Subspecies of bird

The Hawaiian stilt (Himantopus mexicanus knudseni) is an endangered Hawaiian subspecies of the black-necked stilt (H. mexicanus) species. It is a long-legged, slender shorebird with a long, thin beak. Other common names include the Hawaiian black-necked stilt, the aeʻo (from a Hawaiian name for the bird and word for stilts), the kukuluaeʻo (a Hawaiian name for the bird and word for “one standing high”), or it may be referred to as the Hawaiian subspecies of the black-necked stilt.

== Taxonomy ==
The Hawaiian stilt is usually classified as a subspecies of the black-necked stilt, Himantopus mexicanus knudseni, or sometimes as a full species, Himantopus knudseni.

== Description ==
The Hawaiian stilt grows up to 38 cm (15 in) in length. It has a dark back from head to tail, with a white forehead, face, and underside. Its bill is thin, long and black, and its legs are very long and pink. They are sexually dimorphic, differing in the colour and lustre of their back feathers. Females have brown, glossy feathers and males have black, metallic feathers.

In proportion to its body, the Hawaiian stilt has the second-longest legs of any other species of bird. Its eyebrows, cheeks, chin, breast, belly and vent are white.

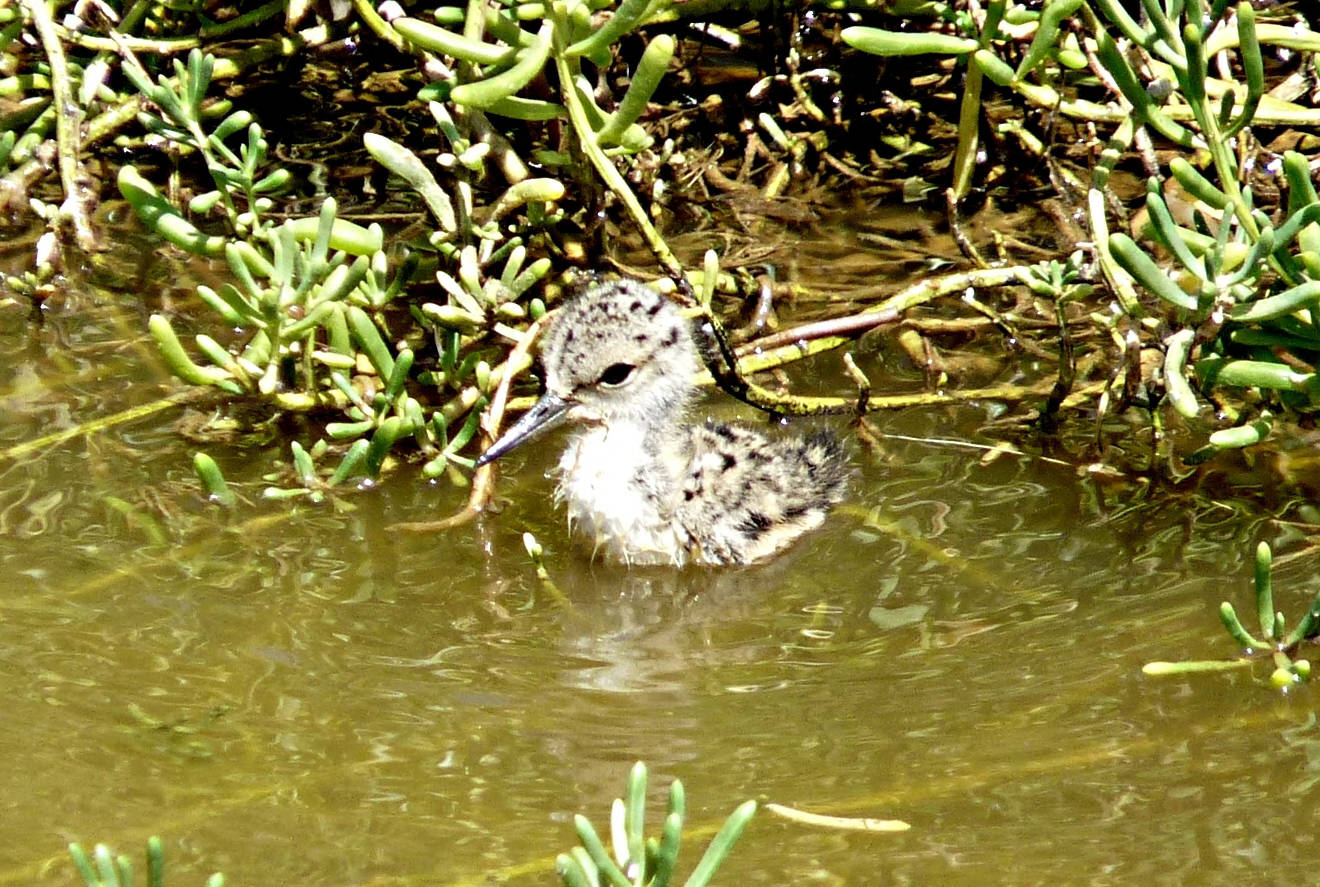
A Hawaiian stilt chick.

At hatching, Hawaiian stilt chicks weigh between 14.5 and 16.7 grams. They have a creamy white stomach and throat, with a tan back and brown mottling. They maintain their down for about 4 weeks (28 days), at which point they fledge and fully develop black and white adult colours. Hawaiian stilt chicks look identical to black-necked stilt chicks, lighter on the underside and brown and gray on their backs, affording them camouflage with the mud frequent in their habitat.

Compared to the nominate subspecies, the North American H. m. mexicanus, the black coloration of the Hawaiian stilt extends noticeably farther around its neck and lower on its face than the black-necked stilt (Himantopus mexicanus), and its bill, tarsus, and tail are longer.

== Behavior ==
They are found in groups, pairs, or alone.

They have a loud chirp described as sounding like "kip kip kip".

=== Breeding ===
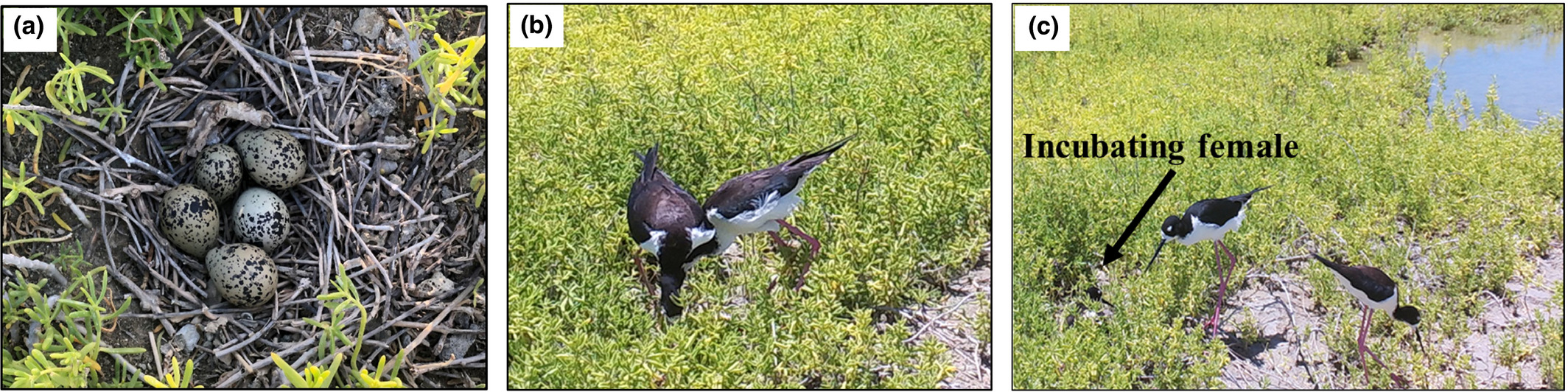
(a) a nest with eggs. (b) a pair of female Hawaiian stilts looking over a nest. (c) a male and female pair of Hawaiian stilts guarding a second female who is incubating the nest.

The stilts nest on mudflats close to the water. Nests are shallow depressions lined with stones, twigs and debris. The eggs have a white to tan colouration, with dark brown or black speckles of various sizes. Usually, clutches contain 8-12 eggs and are typically laid in May. Adults will defend their nests by feigning injury to distract potential predators from their eggs and young, known as the "broken wing" act. Hawaiian stilts are cooperative breeders. Juveniles have been recorded defending the nests of their parents and grandparents, and unrelated adults have been observed incubating the nests of other adults.

=== Feeding ===
The Hawaiian stilt's feeding grounds are shallow bodies of water (between 8 and 11 cm deep), providing a wide variety of fish, crabs, worms, and insects. They primarily hunt using visual cues, pecking or plunging to catch their prey.

== Distribution and habitat ==
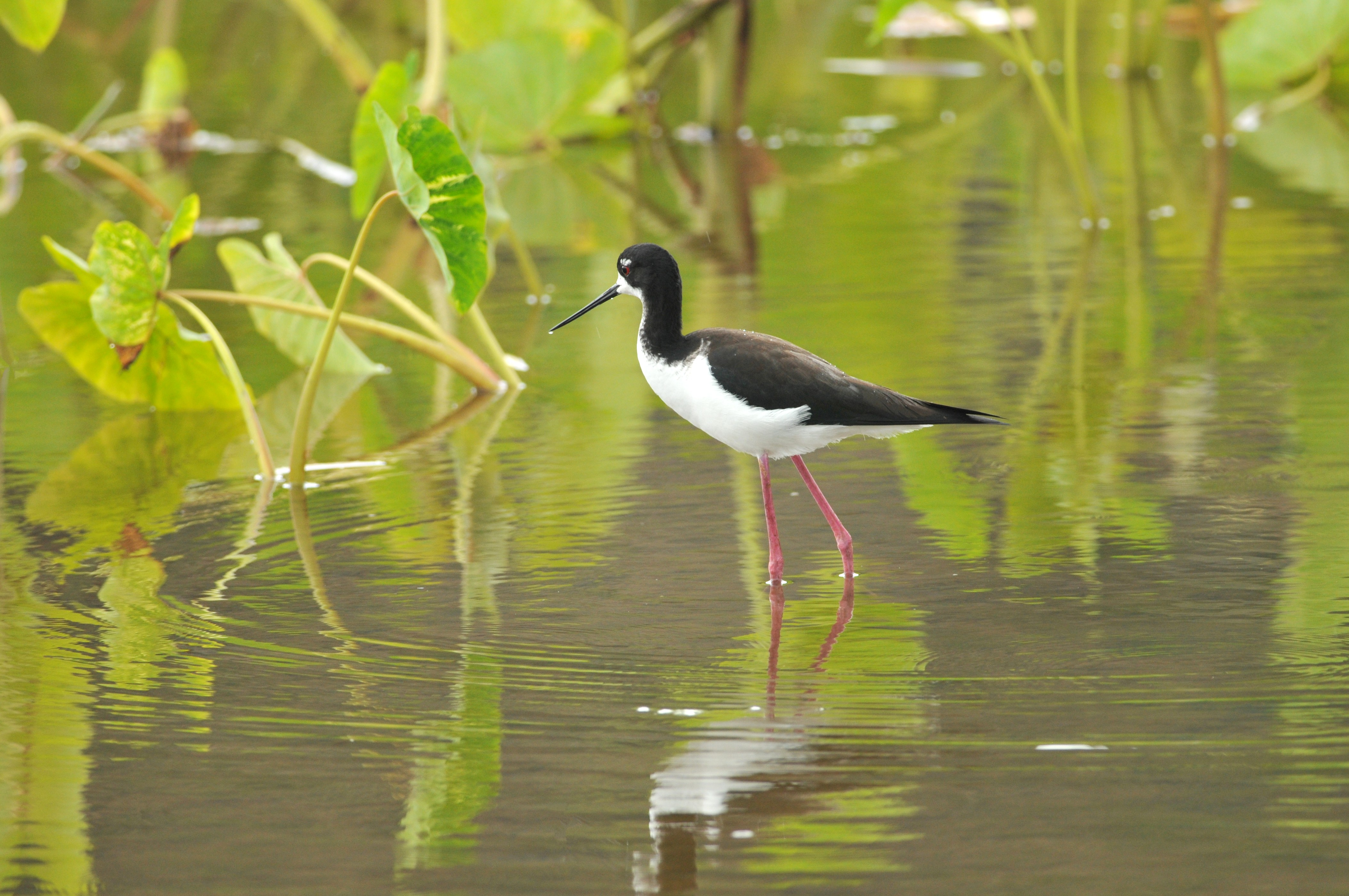
On Kauaʻi

An estimated 92% of the Hawaiian stilt population is on Maui, Oʻahu, and Kauaʻi, with annual presence on Niʻihau, Molokaʻi, and Hawaiʻi, and rare observation on Lanai (1993 estimate). The species is generally found below elevations of 150 m (490 ft).

The Hawaiian stilt occurs locally on all the main Hawaiian islands, and there are still breeding populations on Maui, Oʻahu and Kauaʻi where it is fairly common. It is uncommon on Molokaʻi and Lānaʻi, and scarce on Hawaiʻi. Many of Kauaʻi's birds migrate to Niʻihau during wet winters. The stilts are most often seen in wetlands near the ocean on the main islands. They may occur in large groups on ponds, marshes and mudflats.

== Status and conservation ==
The subspecies is LE (Listed Endangered) in the US Endangered Species Act (USESA), and its NatureServe Conservation Status was ranked G5T2 in 1996, meaning the species is globally secure (G5), but the Hawaiian subspecies is imperiled (T2). The population is estimated to be slightly increasing since it was included in the USESA in 1967. According to state biannual waterbird surveys, population estimates varied between 1,100 and 1,783 between 1997 and 2007.

Conservation programs are protecting populations and breeding grounds, and also establishing additional populations to reduce risk of extinction. The state of Hawaii and the US Fish and Wildlife Service have protected 23% of the state's coastal wetlands.

=== Threats ===
The Hawaiian stilt, like many of Hawaii's native endemic birds, is facing extensive conservation threats. In the past 250 years, many animals have been introduced to the Hawaiian islands. Primary causes of historical population decline are loss and degradation of wetland habitat, and introduced predators such as rats, dogs, cats, and mongooses. Other causes included introduced plants and fish, bullfrogs, disease, and environmental contaminants. Native predators include the pueo and black-crowned night heron. The Hawaiian stilt was a popular game bird until waterbird hunting was banned in Hawaii in 1939.
