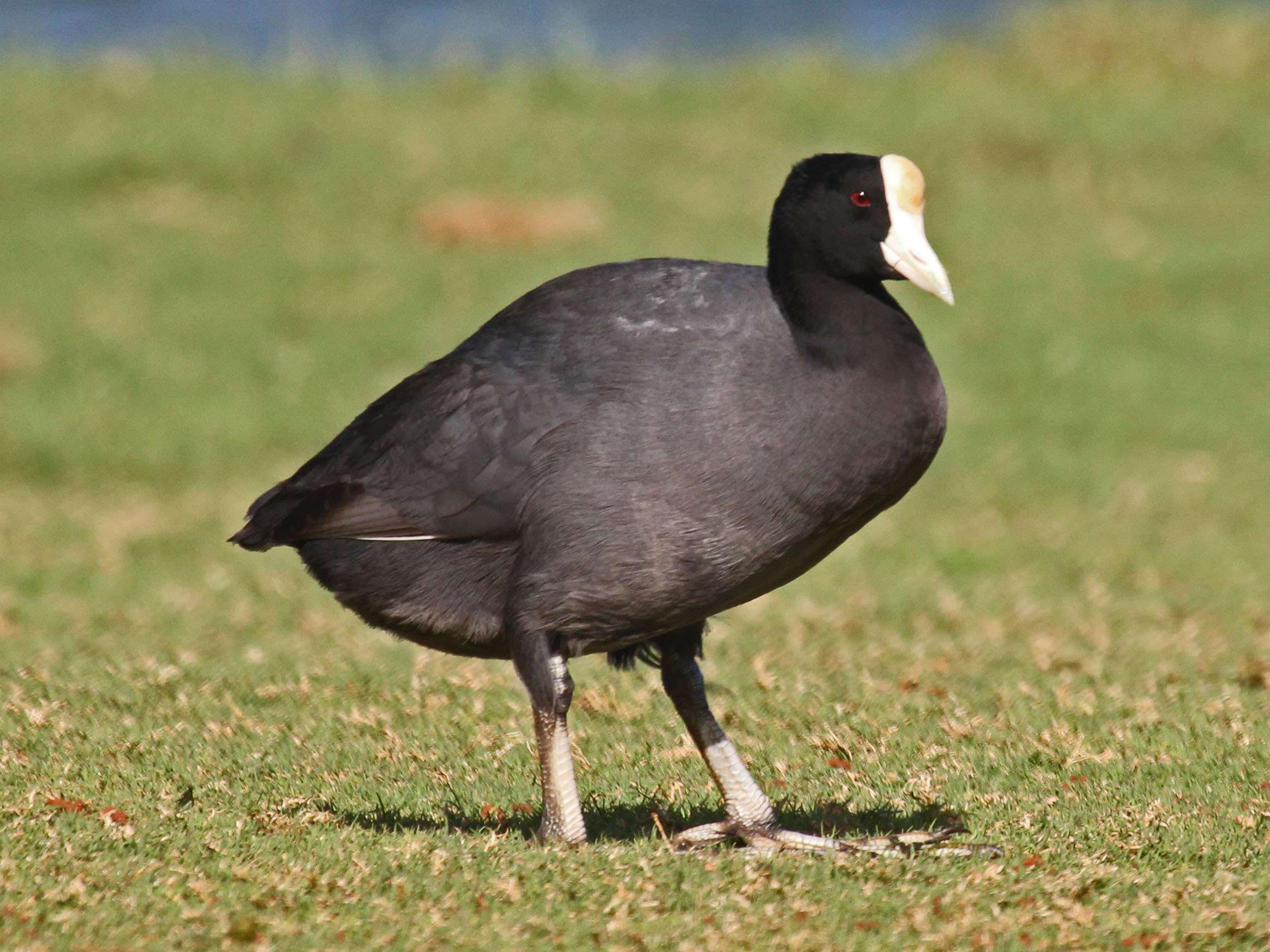
- ʻAlae keʻokeʻo with yellowish frontal shield

Conservation status
- Near Threatened (IUCN 3.1)

Scientific classification
- Kingdom: Animalia
- Phylum: Chordata
- Class: Aves
- Order: Gruiformes
- Family: Rallidae
- Genus: Fulica
- Species: F. alai

Binomial name
- Fulica alai Peale, 1849

= Hawaiian coot =

ʻAlae keʻokeʻo

Species of bird

The ʻAlae keʻokeʻo (Fulica alai), also known as the Hawaiian coot in English, is a bird in the rail family, Rallidae, that is endemic to Hawaii. In Hawaiian, ʻalae is a noun and means mud hen. Keʻo is an adjective for clear or white. It is similar to the American coot at 33–40.6 cm (13–16 in) in length and weighing around 700 g (1 lb 9 oz). It has black plumage and a prominent white frontal shield. Its natural habitats are freshwater lakes, freshwater marshes, coastal saline lagoons, and water storage areas. The bird was federally listed in October 1970 as an endangered species and is considered both endemic and endangered by the state of Hawaiʻi. It is threatened by habitat loss and introduced predators such as the small Asian mongoose. The Makalawena Marsh on the Big Island of Hawaiʻi has been listed as a National Natural Landmark to preserve one of its last nesting areas.

== Endangered Species Listing ==
The ʻAlae keʻokeʻo was federally listed in October 1970 as an endangered species and is considered both endemic and endangered by the state of Hawaiʻi. The United States Fish and Wildlife Service's 5-year review, conducted in 2010, found that none of the four criteria established for delisting or downlisting of the species had been met. The delisting/downlisting criteria include protection and management of core and supporting wetlands, a population size greater than 2000 birds for five consecutive years, and multiple self-sustaining populations throughout the Hawaiian Islands.

== Taxonomy ==
The first reference to a coot in the Hawaiian Islands was by Andrew Bloxam, who encountered the ʻAlae keʻokeʻo but failed to collect a specimen as he mistook it for the Eurasian coot, Fulica atra, while in the islands in 1825 as the naturalist on board HMS Blonde. It is now considered either to be a separate species, Fulica alai, or a subspecies of the American coot, Fulica americana alai.

== Population size ==
On Oʻahu, Maui, Molokaʻi and Kauaʻi, the ʻAlae keʻokeʻo was previously abundant in coastal brackish and fresh-water ponds, streams, and marshes; however, the first censuses conducted in the 1950s and 1960s detected fewer than 1,000 birds statewide. Since the 1960s, the interannual population size has fluctuated from less than 1,000 birds to over 3,000, and appears to be gradually increasing. Biannual surveys conducted by the Hawaiian Department of Land and Natural Resource's Division of Forestry and Wildlife (DOFAW) found that between 1998 and 2003 the inter-island ʻAlae keʻokeʻo population averaged 2,100 birds, ranging between 1,500 and 3,000 birds. Recent surveys estimated winter populations fluctuating around 1,500 birds and a summer population fluctuating around 2,000 birds.

== Gallery ==
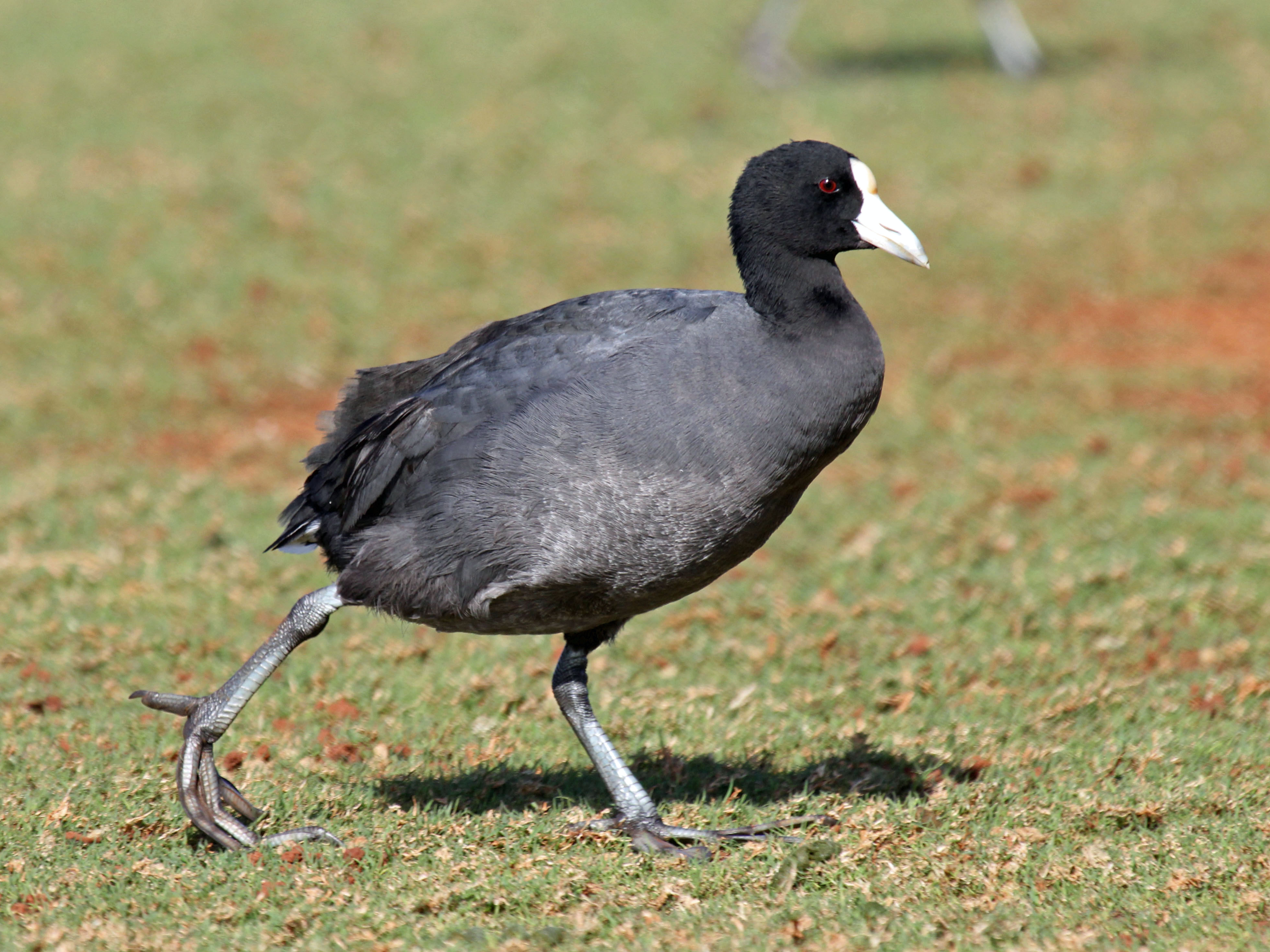
ʻAlae keʻokeʻo with white frontal shield

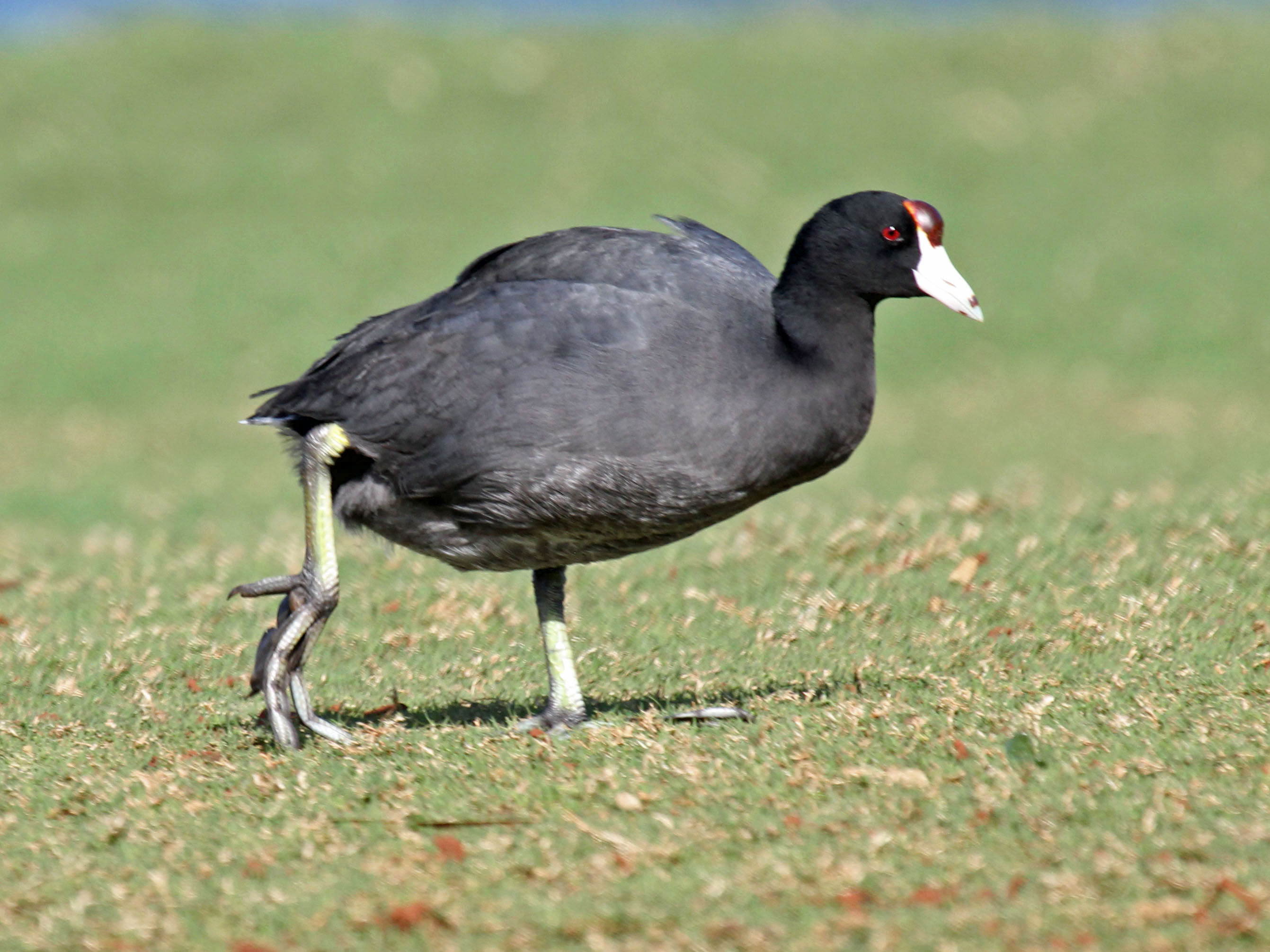
ʻAlae keʻokeʻo with red frontal shield

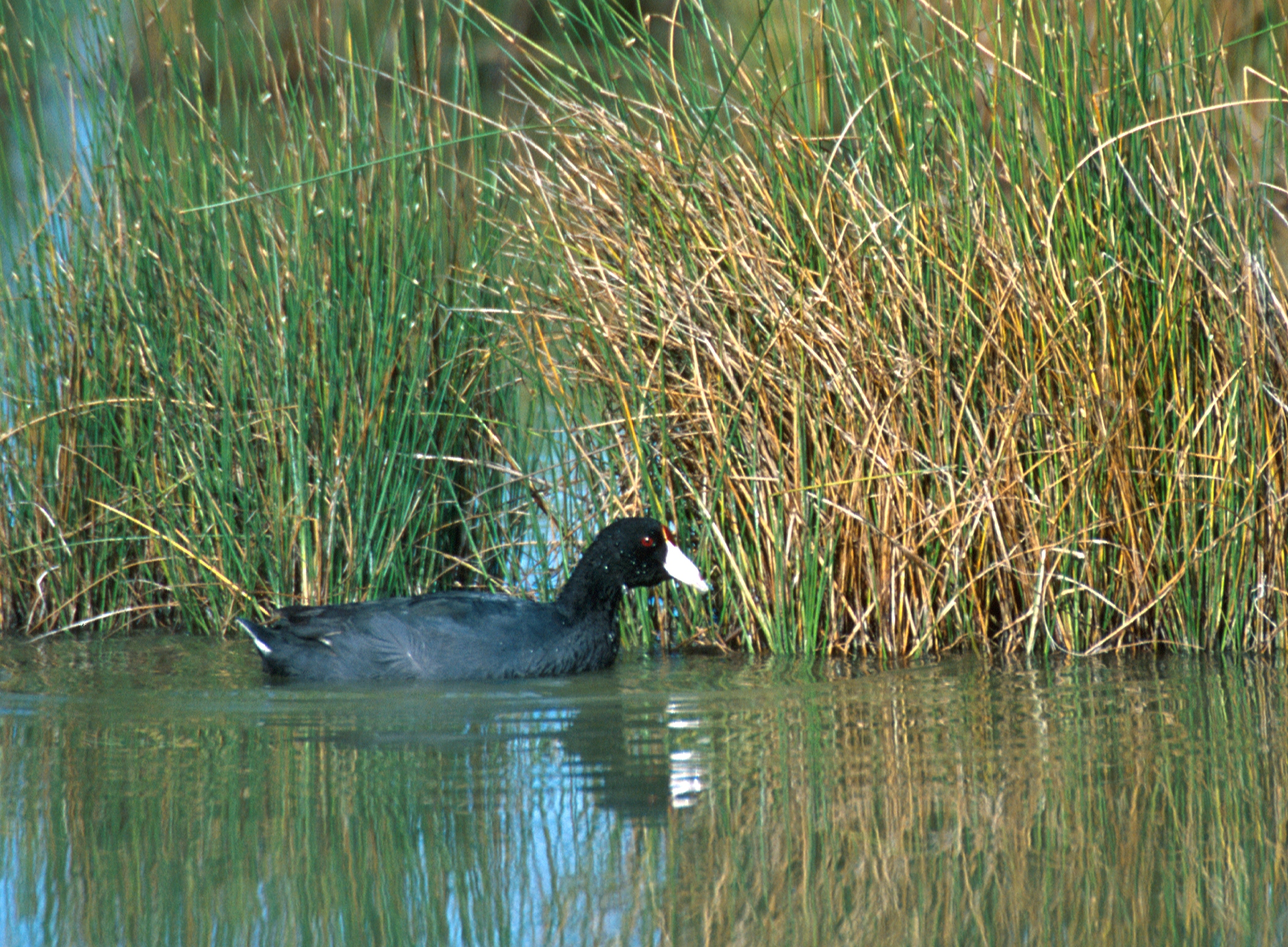
ʻAlae keʻokeʻo with red frontal shield
