= Hawaiian phonology =

Phonological system of the Hawaiian language

The phonological system of the Hawaiian language is based on documentation from those who developed the Hawaiian alphabet during the 1820s as well as scholarly research conducted by lexicographers and linguists from 1949 to present.

Hawaiian has only eight consonant phonemes: /m, n, p ~ b, t ~ k, ʔ, w ~ v, l ~ ɾ ~ ɹ, h/. There is allophonic variation of [k] with [t], [w] with [v], and [l] with [ɾ]. The [t ~ k] variation is highly unusual among the world's languages.

Hawaiian has either 5 or 25 vowel phonemes, depending on how long vowels and diphthongs are analyzed. If the long vowels and diphthongs are treated as two-phoneme sequences, the total of vowel phonemes is five. However, if the long vowels and diphthongs are treated as separate, unit phonemes, there are 25 vowel phonemes. The short vowel phonemes are /u, i, o, e, a/. If long vowels are counted separately, they are /uː, iː, oː, eː, aː/. If diphthongs are counted separately, they are /iu, ou, oi, eu, ei, au, ai, ao, ae, oːu, eːi, aːu, aːi, aːo, aːe/. There is some allophonic variation of the vowels, but it is much less dramatic than that of the consonants.

Hawaiian syllable structure is (C)V(V) where C is any consonant and V is any vowel, which can be long or short. Double vowels (VV) represent falling diphthongs, whose first elements can be either long or short. All CV(V) syllables occur except for wū, but wu occurs only in two words borrowed from English, those being Wulekake 'Vulgate' and wulekula 'vulture'. Word stress is predictable in words of one to four syllables but not in words of five or more syllables. Phonological processes in Hawaiian include palatalization and deletion of consonants and the raising, diphthongization, deletion, and compensatory lengthening of vowels. Phonological reduction (or "decay") of consonant phonemes during the historical development of Hawaiian has resulted in the phonemic glottal stop. The ultimate loss (deletion) of intervocalic consonant phonemes has resulted in long vowels and diphthongs.

== Phonemes and allophones ==
The following description of Hawaiian phonemes and their allophones is based on the experiences of the people who developed the Hawaiian alphabet, as described by Schütz, and on the descriptions of Hawaiian pronunciation and phonology made by Lyovin, and Elbert & Pukui. Some additional details on glottal consonants are found in Carter. A recent overview of Hawaiian segmental phonology has been given by Parker Jones.

It is notable that Hawaiian does not distinguish between [t] and [k]. Few languages do not make this distinction, though several Polynesian languages have independently undergone the historical shift from /t/ to /k/ after the change of /k/ to /ʔ/; Samoan is notable for using [k] in colloquial speech where [t] is used in formal speech. The American missionaries who developed written Hawaiian during the 1820s found that a [t] reflex was common at the Kauaʻi (Tauaʻi) end of the island chain, and a [k] reflex at the Big Island (island of Hawaiʻi) end. They decided to use ⟨k⟩ rather than ⟨t⟩ to represent this phoneme. However, that does not prevent anyone from using the realization [t], in speaking or in writing, if they so desire. The realization [t] is used more frequently than [k] by speakers of Niʻihau dialect.

The spread of literacy in the Hawaiian alphabet likely contributed to the spread of the [k] allophone to Hawaii's westernmost islands.

The missionaries also found allophonic variation between [ɹ] and [ɾ] (written with d) and [l], between [v] and [w], and between [b] and [p].

== Consonants ==
Hawaiian has one of the smallest consonant inventories (those of Rotokas or Pirahã may be smaller, depending on the analysis) and one of the smallest phoneme inventories.

Consonants
	Labial	Lingual	Glottal
Nasal	m	n	
Plosive	p ~ b	t ~ k	ʔ
Continuant	w ⁓ v	l ⁓ ɾ ⁓ ɹ	h

[p] and [b] are reported to be in free variation, although reports of [b] could be a misinterpretation of unaspirated [p] by English speakers.

There is basic free variation of [t] and [k]. However, since Hawaiian has no other stops besides /p/ and /ʔ/, any plosive that is neither labial nor glottal can function as a /k/. Nevertheless, the main allophones noted by the missionaries in the 1820s, and by linguists, are [t] and [k]. There is very little testimony of intermediate sounds between [t] and [k] having been used in speech. Elbert & Pukui point out some instances of a [ʔ] allophone. Schütz conjectured that a t-dialect existed in the northwestern islands, and a k-dialect in the southeastern islands. As of the 1820s, the [k] variant was becoming dominant on Oʻahu. Helen Heffron Roberts documented a sound between that of English ⟨th⟩, [θ] or [ð], and [z] in free variation with [k] among elders from Oʻahu and Kauaʻi while chanting.

There is some evidence for instances of free variation between [n] and [ŋ].

There is also free variation between [l] (lateral), [ɾ] (tap), and [ɹ] (approximant). Elbert & Pukui pointed out some instances of [n] and [ʔ] as allophones. Schütz conjectured that [ɾ] is prevalent in the northwestern islands and [l] is prevalent in the southeastern islands.

There is free variation of [w] and [v]. Pukui & Elbert (1986:xvii) conjectured that there is conditioned variation of [w] and [v], but their use of "usually" makes their theory an admission of free variation. Schütz conjectured that there was neither [w] nor [v], but rather "something between the two". This is most likely [ʋ], a labiodental approximant (see also Schütz's quotes from letter of Artemas Bishop).

Carter showed instances of synchronic alternation of every non-glottal Hawaiian consonant /p, k, m, n, l, w/ with glottal fricative /h/ and glottal stop /ʔ/ (see section on the glottal stop).

There are also instances of variation with null allophones. For example: /huli/ ⁓ /hui/ ('turn'); /luhia/ ⁓ /luia/ ('variety of shark').

Some loanwords have been adapted to Hawaiian's consonant system, while others have motivated changes to Hawaiian's phonology and a division in its lexicon between native, core words and peripheral, foreign ones. For example, when adapting English loanwords, every single non-labial and non-glottal occlusive in English could be mapped to Hawaiian /k/. That said, other, less phonologically adapted loanwords show a number of consonants not native to Hawaiian phonology.

=== Glottal stop ===
In Hawaiian, a phonemic glottal stop historically derives from an earlier consonant. A number of words have variant pronunciations where a glottal stop /ʔ/ or glottal fricative /h/ varies with a non-glottal consonant: it is conjectured that the forms with a non-glottal consonant are older and that this phenomenon is part of a process of consonant deletion. Word-medial glottal stops may be realized as creaky voice.

This can still be seen in the historical development of the dual personal pronouns. This is exhibited in the suffixes for dual and plural number, which come from lua ('two') and kolu ('three') respectively.

Dual pronouns
	1st person		2nd person	3rd person
	exclusive	inclusive	2nd person	3rd person
Meaning	we two	you and I	you two	they two
Old form	/maː + lua/	/kaː + lua/	/ʔo + lua/	/laː + lua/
Glottal form	/maː + ʔua/	/kaː + ʔua/		/laː + ʔua/
New form	/maː + ua/	/kaː + ua/		/laː + ua/

The /l/ of /-lua/ in the first and third person forms has been deleted, resulting in the modern forms māua, kāua, and lāua. The presence of the glottal stop marks the absence of a "phonetically fuller" consonant. The second person form, ʻolua, contains a glottal stop, implying that the /l/ used to be there and /ʔ/ still exists in place of /l/ in the intermediate forms, /maː + ʔua/, /kaː + ʔua/, and /laː + ʔua/.

A Hawaiian glottal stop thus represents the maximal phonetic reduction of other consonants in centuries past.

Elbert & Pukui showed instances of k ⁓ ʔ, and l ⁓ ʔ, such as mukumuku ⁓ muʻumuʻu ('cut'), and pūliki ⁓ pūʻiki ('embrace'). Carter showed examples of all seven of the (other) Hawaiian consonants alternating synchronically with glottal stop:

/C ⁓ ʔ/	/p/	/k/	/h/	/m/	/n/	/l/	/w/
Meaning	ear	long	circle	reddish-brown	tern	light	glowing red
Old form	/pepeiao/	/loːkihi/	/poːhai/	/mea/	/noio/	/maːlamalama/	/wenawena/
Glottal form	/ʔeʔeiao/	/loːʔihi/	/poːʔai/	/ʔea/	/ʔoio/	/maːʔamaʔama/	/ʔenaʔena/

== Vowels ==
Depending on how one analyzes the inventory of Hawaiian vowel phonemes, it has either 5 or 25 phonemes. The minimum figure of 5 is reached by counting only /u/, /i/, /o/, /e/, and /a/ as phonemes. Diphthongs and long vowels are analyzed as being sequences of two vowels. For example, the written form ⟨au⟩ is phonemically /au/, and the written form ⟨ā⟩ is phonemically /aa/. The maximum figure of 25 is reached by counting separately the 5 short vowels, the 5 long vowels, the 9 short diphthongs, and the 6 long diphthongs. A reason given to support this analysis is that the diphthongs "act as unit phonemes in regard to stress".

It is not necessary to postulate that the long vowels and diphthongs should be counted as separate single phonemes, because they can be treated as sequences of two vowels. They are in fact historically derived from two-syllable sequences. This is easily seen in the synchronic co-existence of allomorphic pairs of Hawaiian forms such as kolu with -kou, both meaning 'three'.

The example can be analyzed as a four-phoneme CVCV sequence alternating with a three-phoneme CVV sequence, where the CVV form is derived from the CVCV form through loss of the second consonant. In other words, /kolu/ loses the /l/, resulting in /kou/. Kolu is a root form, while -kou is found in the plural personal pronouns (indicating three or more referents) mākou, kākou, ʻoukou, and lākou.

Vowels in Hawaiian have been described as invariably oral, even when adjacent to nasal consonants, while Parker Jones (2018), describing a native speaker who has non-native-speaking parents and acquired the language in the revitalization movement, found consistent vowel nasalization in post-nasal environments: [ˈlʷoinã] loina 'custom'.

The vowel phonemes are shown in the following tables, along with their approximate allophones.

=== Monophthongs ===
Monophthongs
	Short			Long		
	Front	Central	Back	Front	Central	Back
Close	i		u	iː		uː
Mid	ɛ⁓e⁓i	æ⁓a⁓ɐ⁓ə	o	eː		oː
Open		æ⁓a⁓ɐ⁓ə			aː	

Vowel quality is the same for long and short vowels, except for /eː/ vs. /ɛ/, and /aː/ vs. /ɐ/:

- When short /e/ is stressed it is lowered to [ɛ]. In a sequence of two or more syllables with /e/, unstressed /e/ can also be lowered to [ɛ] but it is otherwise [e]. For example, ʻeleʻele ('black') is pronounced [ˈʔɛlɛ.ʔɛlɛ]. But ʻaleʻale ('full') is pronounced [ˈʔɐleʔɐle]. There are also instances where unstressed short /e/ can be raised to [i]. For example, the negating form, /ʔaʔole/ or /ʔaʔohe/, can be pronounced [ʔaˈʔoli] or [ʔaˈʔohi].
- Short /a/ is phonetically [ɐ] when stressed and [ə] when unstressed.

One might argue for free variation of [a] and [ɐ] for stressed short /a/. However, according to Elbert & Pukui (1979:22–24), citing Kinney (1956) and Newbrand (1951), tape-recorded evidence indicates [ɐ] but not [a]. Even so, the pronunciations [ʔaˈʔoli] and [ʔaˈʔohi] exhibited above show that there are at least some forms where /a/ is realized as [a].

=== Diphthongs ===
The following tables show Hawaiian's system of diphthongs, all of which are falling.

Short diphthongs
		Ending with...			
		/u/	/i/	/o/	/e/
Starting with...	/i/	iu̯			
Starting with...	/o/	ou̯	oi̯		
Starting with...	/e/	eu̯	ei̯		
Starting with...	/a/	au̯	ai̯	ao̯	ae̯

As with its constituent vowels, diphthongs with short /e/ and /a/ are subject to the same free variation described above. In rapid speech, /ai/ and /au/ can become [ei] and [ou] respectively.

Long diphthongs
		Ending with...			
		/u/	/i/	/o/	/e/
Starting with...	/oː/	oːu̯			
Starting with...	/eː/		eːi̯		
Starting with...	/aː/	aːu̯	aːi̯	aːo̯	aːe̯

== Phonotactics ==
Hawaiian syllables may contain one consonant in the onset, or there is no onset. Codas and consonant clusters are prohibited in the phonotactics of Hawaiian words of Austronesian origin. However, the borrowed word Kristo is pronounced [ˈkri.sto].

Hawaiian has a three-way laryngeal contrast in initial position; words may begin with /ʔ/, /h/, or a vowel. This is a rare contrast across languages; it is attested in other Malayo-Polynesian languages, and is also said to be marginal in some Mayan languages.

- ʻā /ʔaː/ 'fire, burning'
- hā /haː/ 'four, fourth'
- ā /aː/ 'when, until, and'

The structure of the Hawaiian syllable can be represented as being (C)V(V), where the C represents an optional initial consonant, the first V represents a vowel which may be long or short, and the optional second V represents the second element of a valid long or short diphthong.

- V syllables. Every theoretically possible V syllable occurs in Hawaiian.
- CV syllables. Every theoretically possible CV syllable occurs, with the single exception of wū. see Hawaiian headwords The syllable wu occurs only in borrowed words. note 4 There are only two such words, with wu, in the Pukui-Elbert dictionary: Wulekake (or Vulegate) ('Vulgate'), and wulekula (or vuletura 'vulture'), the very last Hawaiian headwords listed in the dictionary.

Elbert & Pukui citing Krupa have pointed out that "Certain combinations of sounds are absent or rare." For example, no content word has the form CV:ʔV, and the form CV:CV, is also not common. They also noted that monovocalic content words are always long.

== Stress ==
Word stress is predictable in Hawaiian for words with three or fewer moras (that is, three or fewer vowels, with diphthongs and long vowels counting as two vowels). In such cases, stress is always on the second to last mora. Longer words will also follow this pattern, but may in addition have a second stressed syllable which is not predictable. In Hawaiian, a stressed syllable is louder in volume, longer in duration, and higher in pitch.

1. CVCV, VCV, with both vowels short: áhi, káhi
2. CVCVCV, CVVCV, VCVCV, VVCV—that is, as in (1) but preceded by a short syllable: uáhi, alóha, huáli, kakáhi
3. CVV, VV, with either a long vowel or diphthong: ái, wái, ā (= áa), nā (náa)
4. CVCVV, VCVV, CVVV, VVV—that is, same as (3) but preceded by a short syllable: uái, uhái, kuái, wawái, iā (= iáa), inā (ináa), huā (huáa), nanā (nanáa)

For other Hawaiian words longer than three moras, stress is not predictable (but cf.). However, every word can be analyzed as consisting of a sequence of these stress units:

- ʻéle.makúle ('old man'), stressed as CVCV plus CVCVCV
- makúa.híne ('mother'), stressed as CVCVV plus CVCV

Etymology is not a reliable guide to stress. For example, the following proper names are both composed of three words, of 1, 2, and 2 moras, but their stress patterns differ:

- Ka-imu-kī, pronounced kái.mukíi
- Ka-ʻahu-manu, pronounced kaʻáhu.mánu

== Phonological processes ==
Phonological processes at work in Hawaiian include palatalization of consonants, deletion of consonants, raising and diphthongization of vowels, deletion of unstressed syllables, and compensatory lengthening of vowels. Elbert & Pukui cited Kinney (1956) regarding "natural fast speech" (vowel raising, deletion of unstressed syllables), and Newbrand (1951) regarding Niʻihau dialect (free variation of [t] and [k], deletion of consonants, allophone of /a/, vowel raising).

Kinney (1956) studied tape recordings of 13 or 14 native speakers of Hawaiian. She noted assimilatory raising of vowels in vowel sequences. For example, /ai/ was very frequently pronounced [ei], /au/ was often [ou], and /io/ was often [iu]. She cited specific words, such as /mai/ (directional adverb) as [mei], /mau/ (plural morpheme) as [mou], and /lio/ ('horse') as [liu]. The pronunciation of the island name Maui, Maui, /maui/, was [ˈmʌu.i], with the quality of [ʌ] compared to that of u in English cut. She observed deletion of unstressed syllables, such as /ke akua/ ('God') pronounced [ke ˈkuə], and /hele akula/ ('go') pronounced [ˈhɛlɛ ˈkulə]. She also documented pronunciations of /loaʔa/ ('gotten') as [ˈloʔə], and /puaʔa/ ('pig') as [ˈpuʔə].

Newbrand (1951) found that a Niihauan wrote ⟨t⟩ and ⟨k⟩ interchangeably, and freely varied the pronunciation of both ⟨t⟩ and ⟨k⟩ as [t] or [k]. She found /ʔaʔohe/ ('no') pronounced [ʔaˈʔohi], showing vowel raising of /e/ to [i]. She documented /noho ʔana/ ('staying') pronounced [noo ˈɐnə], showing deletion of the glottal consonants /h/ and /ʔ/. The vowel quality of stressed short /a/ was noted as [ɐ]. More recent observations suggest that [t] and [k] have since fallen into a largely complementary distribution in colloquial Niihau speech, with [k] generally found in a syllable before [t]. Thus Niihau has ketahi as opposed to kekahi or tetahi 'one'.

When used by itself as an exclamation, /kaː/ (mood adverb) is frequently pronounced as [tʃæː] or [sæː].

== Bibliography ==
- Blust, Robert (2004). "*t to k: An Austronesian Sound Change Revisited". Oceanic Linguistics. 43 (2): 365–410. doi:10.1353/ol.2005.0001. ISSN 0029-8115. JSTOR 3623363. S2CID 143013834.
- Carter, Gregory Lee (1996). The Hawaiian Copula Verbs He, ʻO, and I, as Used in the Publications of Native Writers of Hawaiian: A Study in Hawaiian Language and Literature (Thesis). Ann Arbor: University of Hawaiʻi.
- Donegan, Patricia; Stampe, David (2009), "Hypotheses of Natural Phonology", Poznań Studies in Contemporary Linguistics, 45 (1): 1–31, doi:10.2478/v10010-009-0002-x
- Elbert, Samuel H.; Pukui, Mary Kawena (1979), Hawaiian Grammar, Honolulu: The University Press of Hawaiʻi, ISBN 0-8248-0494-5
- Kinney, Ruby Kawena (1956), "A Non-purist View of Morphomorphemic Variations in Hawaiian Speech", Journal of the Polynesian Society, 65 (3): 282–286, JSTOR 20703564
- Lyovin, Anatole V. (1997), An Introduction to the Languages of the World, New York: Oxford University Press, ISBN 0-19-508116-1
- Newbrand, Helene L (1951), A Phonemic Analysis of Hawaiian (PDF), University of Hawaiʻi
- Parker Jones, ‘Oiwi (2006), "Probabilities improve stress-prediction in a CFG of Hawaiian phonology" (PDF), in Lawrence Cavedon; Ingrid Zukerman (eds.), Proceedings of the 2006 Australasian Language Technology Workshop (PDF), Sydney: Sancta Sophia College, pp. 161–2
- Parker Jones, ʻŌiwi (2018), "Hawaiian", Journal of the International Phonetic Association, 48 (1): 103–115, doi:10.1017/S0025100316000438, S2CID 232350292
- Pukui, Mary Kawena; Elbert, Samuel H. (1986). Hawaiian dictionary : Hawaiian-English, English-Hawaiian (Rev. and enl. ed.). Honolulu: University of Hawaiʻi Press. ISBN 9780824807030.
- Ramos, Teresita V. (1971), Tagalog Dictionary, Honolulu: University of Hawaiʻi Press, ISBN 0-87022-676-2
- Roberts, Helen H. (1967). Ancient Hawaiian Music. Bernice P. Bishop Museum bulletin29. New York: Dover Publications. OCLC 1314419.
- Roon, Kevin D.; Davidson, Lisa; Parker Jones, ʻŌiwi (May 1, 2026). "Acoustic properties of utterance-initial glottal stop in Hawaiian". The Journal of the Acoustical Society of America. 159 (5): 4038–4055. doi:10.1121/10.0043708. PMID 42133456.
- Schütz, Albert J. (1994), The Voices of Eden: A History of Hawaiian Language Studies, Honolulu: University of Hawaiʻi Press, ISBN 0-8248-1637-4
- Schütz, Albert J. (1978), "Accent in two Oceanic languages", Anthropological Linguistics, 20 (4): 141–49, JSTOR 30027470
