= Puʻuwai, Hawaii =

Unincorporated community in Hawaii, United States

Puʻuwai
- Unincorporated community
- View over Pu’uwai

- Location in Hawaii and the United States Puʻuwai (Pacific Ocean)
- Coordinates: 21°54′06″N 160°12′14″W
- Country: United States
- State: Hawaii
- County: Kauaʻi
- Island: Niʻihau
- Elevation: 22 ft (6.7 m)

Population
  - Total: 130
- Time zone: UTC−10:00 (HST)

Puʻuwai (literally, "heart" in Hawaiian, pronounced [puʔuˈvɐj]) is an unincorporated community in Kauaʻi County, Hawaii, United States, and the only settlement on the island of Niʻihau. It is at the western coast of the small island, and Native Hawaiians who live in this village speak the Niʻihau dialect of the Hawaiian language. Access to the town, as well as the whole island, is limited to Niʻihau residents; only official visitors and invited guests are permitted. Puʻuwai has a one-room schoolhouse.

Niʻihau is located about 29 km (18 mi; 16 nmi) west of Kauaʻi.

Puʻuwai is the westernmost community in the principal Hawaiian Islands.

== In popular culture ==
The island features in the 1980 alternate history film The Final Countdown, as the "deserted spot" where characters Senator Samuel S. Chapman and Laurel Scott are to be left on the morning of the 1941 attack on Pearl Harbor. The film was set and filmed on board the real-life USS Nimitz (CVN-68).
