= Niihau School of Kekaha =

Charter school in Hawaii, United States

Coordinates: 21.9692823°N 159.7111523°W

The Niihau School of Kekaha (NSK, Hawaiian: Hale Kula Niihau o Kekaha), also known as Ke Kula Niihau O Kekaha Learning Center (KKNOK), is a K-12 charter school in Kekaha, Kauaʻi, Hawaii catering to Niʻihau people living on Kauaʻi.

According to Christine Hitt of Hawaiʻi Magazine, the school is trying to keep the Niʻihau dialect alive due to a growing Niʻihau diaspora in Kauaʻi, where the dominant languages are instead English and Hawaiian Pidgin.

== History ==
On May 17, 2001, the Hawaii State Board of Education approved the creation of the charter school. The state classifies it as a " K-12 New Century Public Charter School".

== Demographics ==
In 2016, there were 54 students, with about 50% being native speakers of Niihau Hawaiian, and with all 54 students being from Niihau. Many of the students are members of the same families. 95% of the students were native Niihau speakers in 2004.

In 2017, there were three teachers for preschool and two other teachers.

== Curriculum ==
Secondary courses are taught in English and elementary courses are taught in the Niihau language.
