= Hawaiianization =

Cultural alteration

Hawaiianization (Hawaiian: Ka hoʻolāʻau Hawaiʻi) refers to the taking of a physical product, word, or concept hitherto unrelated to Hawaiian culture, and confer a Hawaiian form, quality, and character upon it through various means. The word and its conjugated forms are an increasingly popular neologism, in the manner of Anglicisation, Africanization, and Americanization, and is most commonly used in matters of etymology and nomenclature. Consequently, it is used both to mean the transliteration of English into Hawaiian and also the general 'Hawaiianization' of anything.

"Hawaiianization", and its gerundive adjective form, "Hawaiianized", can also refer to the incorporation of the Hawaiian culture, spirit and character into anything, such as:

- the adding of Hawaiian instrumentation and/or language to a non-Hawaiian song
- the adding of Hawaiian themes such as palm trees, tropical flowers, rainbows, dolphins, whales, sea turtles, volcanic lava flows, etc. to textiles and artifacts
- the adding of papaya, mango and/or guava flavors to drinks and edibles
- the adding of Hawaiian tropical flower fragrances such as ginger, plumeria, gardenia and tuberose to lotions and beauty products
- the use of Hawaiian ideas in gardening
