= Hawaiian language =

Polynesian language spoken in Hawaii

Hawaiian
- ʻōlelo Hawaiʻi
- Pronunciation: [ʔoːˈlɛlo həˈvɐjʔi]
- Native to: Hawaiian Islands
- Region: Hawaiʻi (Niʻihau)
- Ethnicity: Hawaiian
- Native speakers: ~300 (2006); L2: 22,000–24,000; Used at home: 18,000
- Language family: Austronesian: Malayo-Polynesian; Oceanic; Polynesian; Eastern Polynesian; Marquesic; Hawaiian
- Early forms: Proto-Austronesian: Proto-Malayo-Polynesian; Proto-Oceanic; Proto-Central Pacific; Proto-Polynesian
- Dialects: Standard Hawaiian; Niʻihau dialect; Molokaʻi dialect
- Writing system: Latin (Hawaiian alphabet); Hawaiian Braille

Official status
- Official language in: Hawaiʻi

Language codes
- ISO 639-2: haw
- ISO 639-3: haw
- Glottolog: hawa1245
- ELP: Hawaiian
- Linguasphere: 39-CAQ-e
- Hawaiian is classified as Critically Endangered by the UNESCO Atlas of the World's Languages in Danger.

Hawaiian (‘ōlelo Hawai‘i, pronounced [ʔoːˈlɛlo həˈvɐiʔi]) is a critically endangered Polynesian language of the Austronesian language family, originating in and native to the Hawaiian Islands. It is the historic native language of the Hawaiian people. Hawaiian, along with English, is an official language of the U.S. state of Hawaiʻi. King Kamehameha III established the first Hawaiian-language constitution in 1839 and 1840.

In 1896, the Republic of Hawaii passed Act 57, an English-only law which subsequently banned Hawaiian language as the medium of instruction in publicly funded schools and promoted strict physical punishment for children caught speaking the Hawaiian language in schools. The Hawaiian language was not again allowed to be used as a medium of instruction in Hawaii's public schools until 1987, a span of 91 years. The number of native speakers of Hawaiian gradually decreased during the period from the 1830s to the 1950s. English essentially displaced Hawaiian on six of seven inhabited islands. In 2001, native speakers of Hawaiian amounted to less than 0.1% of the statewide population.

From around 1949 to the present day, there has been a gradual increase in attention to and promotion of the language. Public Hawaiian-language immersion preschools called Pūnana Leo were established in 1984; other immersion schools followed soon after that. Most of the first students to start in immersion preschool have since graduated from college, and many are fluent Hawaiian speakers. However, the language is still classified as critically endangered by UNESCO.

A creole language, Hawaiian Pidgin (also called Hawai‘i Creole English, or HCE), is more commonly spoken in Hawai‘i than Hawaiian.

== Name ==
The Hawaiian language takes its name from the largest island in the Hawaiian archipelago, Hawaii (Hawaiʻi in the Hawaiian language). The island name was first written in English in 1778 by British explorer James Cook and his crew members. They wrote it as "Owhyhee" or "Owhyee". It is written "Oh-Why-hee" on the first map of Sandwich Islands engraved by Tobias Conrad Lotter in 1781. Explorers Mortimer (1791) and Otto von Kotzebue (1821) used that spelling.

The initial "O" in the name "Oh-Why-hee" is a reflection of the fact that Hawaiian predicates unique identity by using a copula form, ʻo, immediately before a proper noun. Thus, in Hawaiian, the name of the island is expressed by saying ʻO Hawaiʻi, which means "[This] is Hawaiʻi." The Cook expedition also wrote "Otaheite" rather than "Tahiti". The spelling "why" in the name reflects the [ʍ] pronunciation of wh in 18th-century English (still used in parts of the English-speaking world). The spelling "hee" or "ee" represents the sounds [hi] or [i]. Putting the parts together, O-why-(h)ee reflects [o-hwai-i], a reasonable approximation of the native pronunciation, [ʔo həwɐiʔi].

American missionaries bound for Hawaiʻi used the phrases "Owhihe Language" and "Owhyhee language" in Boston prior to their departure in October 1819 and during their five-month voyage to Hawaiʻi. They still used such phrases as late as March 1822. However, by July 1823, they had begun using the phrase "Hawaiian Language".

In Hawaiian, the language is called ʻŌlelo Hawaiʻi, since adjectives follow nouns.

== Language family and origin ==
Hawaiian is a Polynesian member of the Austronesian language family. It is closely related to other Polynesian languages, such as Samoan, Marquesan, Tahitian, Māori, Rapa Nui (the language of Easter Island) and Tongan.

According to Schütz (1994), the Marquesans colonized the archipelago in roughly 300 CE, followed by later waves of immigration from the Society Islands and Samoa-Tonga. Their languages, over time, became the Hawaiian language within the Hawaiian Islands. Kimura and Wilson (1983) also state:

Linguists agree that Hawaiian is closely related to Eastern Polynesian, with a particularly strong link in the Southern Marquesas, and a secondary link in Tahiti, which may be explained by voyaging between the Hawaiian and Society Islands.

=== Mutual intelligibility ===
Jack H. Ward (1962) conducted a study using basic words and short utterances to determine the level of comprehension between different Polynesian languages. The mutual intelligibility of Hawaiian was found to be 41.2% with Marquesan, 37.5% with Tahitian, 25.5% with Samoan and 6.4% with Tongan. Hawaiian newspapers recorded that Ernest Kaʻai and his Royal Hawaiians band conversed easily with Māori while they were on tour across New Zealand in 1911.

== History ==
=== First European contact ===
In 1778, British explorer James Cook made Europe's initial, recorded first contact with Hawaiʻi, beginning a new phase in the development of Hawaiian. During the next forty years, the sounds of Spanish (1789), Russian (1804), French (1816), and German (1816) arrived in Hawaiʻi via other explorers and businessmen. Hawaiian began to be written for the first time, largely restricted to isolated names and words, and word lists collected by explorers and travelers.

The early explorers and merchants who first brought European languages to the Hawaiian islands also took on a few native crew members who brought the Hawaiian language into new territory. Hawaiians took these nautical jobs because their traditional way of life changed due to plantations, and although there were not enough of these Hawaiian-speaking explorers to establish any viable speech communities abroad, they still had a noticeable presence. One of them, a boy in his teens known as Obookiah (ʻŌpūkahaʻia), had a major impact on the future of the language. He sailed to New England, where he eventually became a student at the Foreign Mission School in Cornwall, Connecticut. He inspired New Englanders to support a Christian mission to Hawaiʻi, and provided information on the Hawaiian language to the American missionaries there prior to their departure for Hawaiʻi in 1819. Adelbert von Chamisso too might have consulted with a native speaker of Hawaiian in Berlin, Germany, before publishing his grammar of Hawaiian (Über die Hawaiische Sprache) in 1837. Lorrin Andrews wrote the first Hawaiian dictionary, called A Dictionary of the Hawaiian Language.

==== Folk tales ====
Like all natural spoken languages, the Hawaiian language was originally an oral language. The native people of the Hawaiian language relayed religion, traditions, history, and views of their world through stories that were handed down from generation to generation. One form of storytelling most commonly associated with the Hawaiian islands is hula. Nathaniel B. Emerson notes that "It kept the communal imagination in living touch with the nation's legendary past".

The islanders' connection with their stories is argued to be one reason why Captain James Cook received a pleasant welcome. Marshall Sahlins has observed that Hawaiian folktales began bearing similar content to those of the Western world in the eighteenth century. He argues this was caused by the timing of Captain Cook's arrival, which was coincidentally when the indigenous Hawaiians were celebrating the Makahiki festival, which is the annual celebration of the harvest in honor of the god Lono. The celebration lasts for the entirety of the rainy season. It is a time of peace with much emphasis on amusements, food, games, and dancing. The islanders' story foretold of the god Lono's return at the time of the Makahiki festival.

=== Written Hawaiian ===
In 1820, Protestant missionaries from New England arrived in Hawaiʻi, and in a few years converted the chiefs to Congregational Protestantism, who in turn converted their subjects. To the missionaries, the thorough Christianization of the kingdom necessitated a complete translation of the Bible to Hawaiian, a previously unwritten language, and therefore the creation of a standard spelling that should be as easy to master as possible. The orthography created by the missionaries was so straightforward that literacy spread very quickly among the adult population; at the same time, the Mission set more and more schools for children.

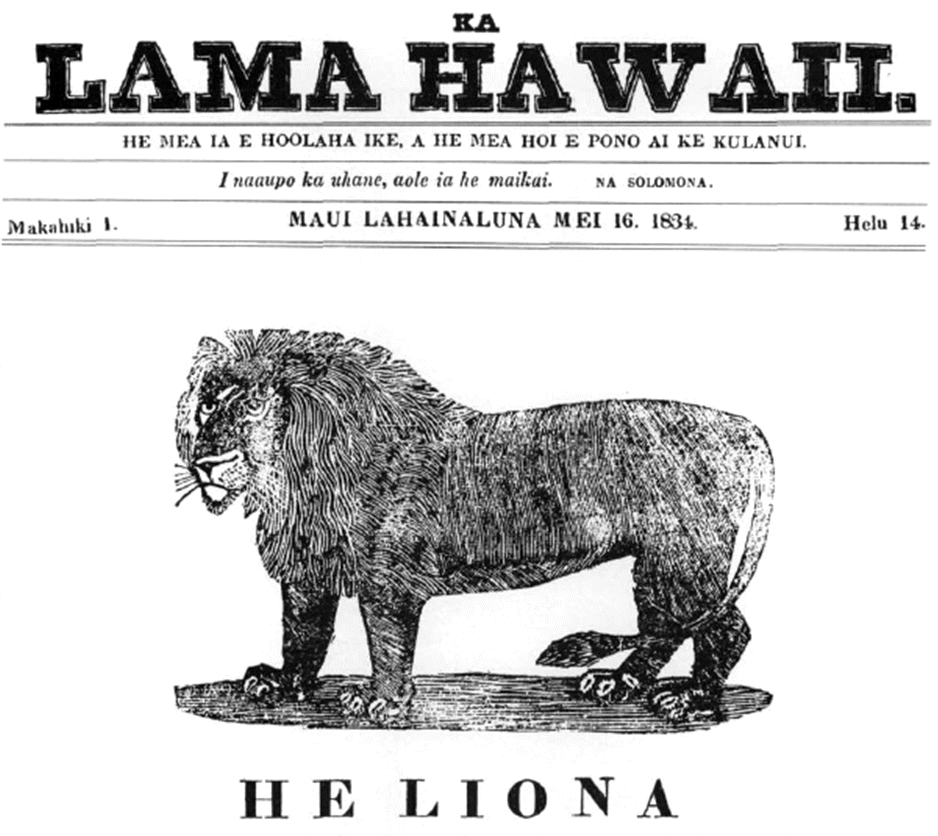
Headline from May 16, 1834, issue of newspaper published by Lorrin Andrews and students at Lahainaluna School

In 1834, the first Hawaiian-language newspapers were published by missionaries working with locals. The missionaries also played a significant role in publishing a vocabulary (1836), grammar (1854), and dictionary (1865) of Hawaiian. The Hawaiian Bible was fully completed in 1839; by then, the Mission had such a wide-reaching school network that, when in 1840 it handed it over to the Hawaiian government, the Hawaiian Legislature mandated compulsory state-funded education for all children under 14 years of age, including girls, twelve years before any similar compulsory education law was enacted for the first time in any of the United States. King Kamehameha III established the first Hawaiian-language constitution in 1839 and 1840.

Literacy in Hawaiian was so widespread that in 1842 a law mandated that people born after 1819 had to be literate to be allowed to marry. In his Report to the Legislature for the year 1853 Richard Armstrong, the minister of Public Instruction, bragged that 75% of the adult population could read. Use of the language among the general population might have peaked around 1881. Even so, some people worried, as early as 1854, that the language was "soon destined to extinction."

When Hawaiian King David Kalākaua took a trip around the world, he brought his native language with him. When his wife, Queen Kapiʻolani, and his sister, Princess (later Queen) Liliʻuokalani, took a trip across North America and on to the British Isles, in 1887, Liliʻuokalani's composition "Aloha ʻOe" was already a famous song in the U.S.

=== Suppression of Hawaiian ===
The decline of the Hawaiian language was accelerated by the coup that overthrew the Hawaiian monarchy and dethroned the last Hawaiian queen. Thereafter, a law was instituted that required English as the main language of school instruction. The law cited is identified as Act 57, sec. 30 of the 1896 Laws of the Republic of Hawaiʻi:

The English Language shall be the medium and basis of instruction in all public and private schools, provided that where it is desired that another language shall be taught in addition to the English language, such instruction may be authorized by the Department, either by its rules, the curriculum of the school, or by direct order in any particular instance. Any schools that shall not conform to the provisions of this section shall not be recognized by the Department.

— The Laws of Hawaii, Chapter 10, Section 123

This law established English as the medium of instruction for the government-recognized schools both "public and private". While it did not ban or make illegal the Hawaiian language in other contexts, its implementation in the schools had far-reaching effects. Those who had been pushing for English-only schools took this law as licence to extinguish the native language at the early education level. While the law did not make Hawaiian illegal (it was still commonly spoken at the time), many children who spoke Hawaiian at school, including on the playground, were disciplined. This included corporal punishment and going to the home of the offending child to advise them strongly to stop speaking it in their home. Moreover, the law specifically provided for teaching languages "in addition to the English language", reducing Hawaiian to the status of an extra language, subject to approval by the department. Hawaiian was not taught initially in any school, including the all-Hawaiian Kamehameha Schools. This is largely because when these schools were founded, like Kamehameha Schools founded in 1887 (nine years before this law), Hawaiian was being spoken in the home. Once this law was enacted, individuals at these institutions took it upon themselves to enforce a ban on Hawaiian. Beginning in 1900, Mary Kawena Pukui, who was later the co-author of the Hawaiian–English Dictionary, was punished for speaking Hawaiian by being rapped on the forehead, allowed to eat only bread and water for lunch, and denied home visits on holidays. Winona Beamer was expelled from Kamehameha Schools in 1937 for chanting Hawaiian. Due in part to this systemic suppression of the language after the overthrow, Hawaiian is still considered a critically endangered language.

National origin of students in the schools of Hawaii (1890–1920)

However, informal coercion to drop Hawaiian would not have worked by itself. Just as important was the fact that, in the same period, native Hawaiians were becoming a minority in their own land on account of the growing influx of foreign labourers and their children. Whereas in 1890 pure Hawaiian students made 56% of school enrollment, in 1900 their numbers were down to 32% and, in 1910, to 16.9%. At the same time, Hawaiians were very prone to intermarriage: the number of "Part-Hawaiian" students (i.e., children of mixed White-Hawaiian marriages) grew from 1573 in 1890 to 3718 in 1910. In such mixed households, the low prestige of Hawaiian led to the adoption of English as the family language. Moreover, Hawaiians lived mostly in the cities or scattered across the countryside, in direct contact with other ethnic groups and without any stronghold (with the exception of Niʻihau). Thus, even pure Hawaiian children would converse daily with their schoolmates of diverse mother tongues in English, which was now not just the teachers' language but also the common language needed for everyday communication among friends and neighbours out of school as well. In only a generation English (or rather Pidgin) would become the primary and dominant language of all children, despite the efforts of Hawaiian and immigrant parents to maintain their ancestral languages within the family.

=== 1949 to present ===
In 1949, the legislature of the Territory of Hawaiʻi commissioned Mary Kawena Pukui and Samuel Hoyt Elbert to write a new dictionary of Hawaiian, either revising the Andrews-Parker work or starting from scratch. Pukui and Elbert took a middle course, using what they could from the Andrews dictionary, but making certain improvements and additions that were more significant than a minor revision. The dictionary they produced, in 1957, introduced an era of gradual increase in attention to the language and culture.

Language revitalization and Hawaiian culture has seen a major revival since the Hawaiian renaissance in the 1970s. Forming in 1983, the ʻAha Pūnana Leo, meaning "language nest" in Hawaiian, opened its first center in 1984. It was a privately funded Hawaiian preschool program that invited native Hawaiian elders to speak to children in Hawaiian every day.

Efforts to promote the language have increased in recent decades. Hawaiian-language "immersion" schools are now open to children whose families want to reintroduce the Hawaiian language for future generations. The ʻAha Pūnana Leo's Hawaiian language preschools in Hilo, Hawaii, have received international recognition. The local National Public Radio station features a short segment titled "Hawaiian word of the day" and a Hawaiian language news broadcast. Honolulu television station KGMB ran a weekly Hawaiian language program, ʻĀhaʻi ʻŌlelo Ola, as recently as 2010. Additionally, the Sunday editions of the Honolulu Star-Advertiser, the largest newspaper in Hawaii, feature a brief article called Kauakukalahale written entirely in Hawaiian by teachers, students, and community members.

The number of native speakers of Hawaiian, which was under 0.1% of the statewide population in 1997, has risen to 2,000, out of 24,000 total who are fluent in the language, according to the US 2011 census. On six of the seven permanently inhabited islands, Hawaiian has been largely displaced by English, but on Niʻihau, native speakers of Hawaiian have remained fairly isolated and have continued to use Hawaiian almost exclusively. A 2016 state government estimate states that only 18,000 residents of the state claim to speak Hawaiian at home.

=== Niʻihau ===
Niʻihau is the only area in the world where Hawaiian is the first language and English is a foreign language.

— Samuel Elbert and Mary Pukui, Hawaiian Grammar (1979)

The isolated island of Niʻihau, located off the southwest coast of Kauaʻi, is the one island where Hawaiian (more specifically a local dialect of Hawaiian known as Niʻihau dialect) is still spoken as the language of daily life. Elbert & Pukui (1979:23) states that "[v]ariations in Hawaiian dialects have not been systematically studied", and that "[t]he dialect of Niʻihau is the most aberrant and the one most in need of study". They recognized that Niʻihauans can speak Hawaiian in substantially different ways. Their statements are based in part on some specific observations made by Newbrand (1951). (See Hawaiian phonological processes)

Friction has developed between those on Niʻihau that speak Hawaiian as a first language, and those who speak Hawaiian as a second language, especially those educated by the College of Hawaiian Language at the University of Hawaiʻi at Hilo. The university sponsors a Hawaiian Language Lexicon Committee (Kōmike Huaʻōlelo Hou) which coins words for concepts that historically have not existed in the language, like "computer" and "cell phone". These words are generally not incorporated into the Niʻihau dialect, which often coins its own words organically. Some new words are Hawaiianized versions of English words, and some are composed of Hawaiian roots.

== Hawaiian in schools ==
=== Hawaiian medium schools ===
The Hawaiian medium education system is a combination of charter, public, and private schools. K–6 schools operate under coordinated governance of the Department of Education and the charter school, while the pre-K–12 laboratory system is governed by the Department of Education, the ʻAha Pūnana Leo, and the charter school. Over 80% of graduates from these laboratory schools attend college, some of which include Ivy-League schools. Hawaiian is now an authorized course in the Department of Education language curriculum, though not all schools offer the language.

There are two kinds of Hawaiian-immersion medium schools: K–12 total Hawaiian-immersion schools, and grades 7–12 partial Hawaiian immersion schools, the latter having some classes that are taught in English and others are taught in Hawaiian. One of the main focuses of Hawaiian-medium schools is to teach the form and structure of the Hawaiian language by modeling sentences as a "pepeke", meaning squid in Hawaiian. In this case the pepeke is a metaphor that features the body of a squid with the three essential parts: the poʻo (head), the ʻawe (tentacles) and the piko (where the poʻo and ʻawe meet) representing how a sentence is structured. The poʻo represents the predicate, the piko representing the subject and the ʻawe representing the object. Hawaiian immersion schools teach content that both adheres to state standards and stresses Hawaiian culture and values. The existence of immersion schools in Hawaiʻi has developed the opportunity for intergenerational transmission of Hawaiian at home.

=== Higher education ===
The Ka Haka ʻUla O Keʻelikōlani College of Hawaiian Language is a college at the University of Hawaii at Hilo dedicated to providing courses and programs entirely in Hawaiian. It educates and provides training for teachers and school administrators of Hawaiian medium schools. It is the only college in the United States of America that offers a master's and doctorate's degree in an Indigenous language. Programs offered at The Ka Haka ʻUla O Keʻelikōlani College of Hawaiian Language are known collectively as the "Hilo model" and has been imitated by the Cherokee immersion program and several other Indigenous revitalization programs.

Since 1921, the University of Hawaiʻi at Manoa and all of the University of Hawaiʻi Community Colleges also offer Hawaiian language courses to students for credit. The university now also offers free online courses not for credit, along with a few other websites and apps such as Duolingo.

== Orthography ==
Hawaiians had no written language prior to Western contact, except for petroglyph symbols. The modern Hawaiian alphabet, ka pīʻāpā Hawaiʻi, is based on the Latin script. Hawaiian words end only in vowels, and every consonant must be followed by a vowel. The Hawaiian alphabetical order has all of the vowels before the consonants, as in the following chart.

Aa	Ee	Ii	Oo	Uu	Hh	Kk	Ll	Mm	Nn	Pp	Ww	ʻ
/a/	/e/	/i/	/o/	/u/	/h/	/k~t/	/l/	/m/	/n/	/p/	/v~w/	/ʔ/

=== Origin ===
This writing system was developed by American Protestant missionaries during 1820–1826. It was the first thing they ever printed in Hawaii, on January 7, 1822, and it originally included the consonants B, D, R, T, and V, in addition to the current ones (H, K, L, M, N, P, W), and it had F, G, J, S, Y and Z for "spelling foreign words". The initial printing also showed the five vowel letters (A, E, I, O, U) and seven of the short diphthongs (AE, AI, AO, AU, EI, EU, OU).

In 1826, the developers voted to eliminate some of the letters which represented functionally redundant allophones (called "interchangeable letters"), enabling the Hawaiian alphabet to approach the ideal state of one-symbol-one-phoneme, and thereby optimizing the ease with which people could teach and learn the reading and writing of Hawaiian. For example, instead of spelling one and the same word as pule, bule, pure, and bure (because of interchangeable p/b and l/r), the word is spelled only as pule.

- Interchangeable B/P. B was dropped, P was kept.
- Interchangeable L/R. R and D were dropped, L was kept.
- Interchangeable K/T. T was dropped, K was kept.
- Interchangeable V/W. V was dropped, W was kept.

However, hundreds of words were very rapidly borrowed into Hawaiian from English, Greek, Hebrew, Latin, and Syriac. Although these loan words were necessarily Hawaiianized, they often retained some of their "non-Hawaiian letters" in their published forms. For example, Brazil fully Hawaiianized is Palakila, but retaining "foreign letters" it is Barazila. Another example is Gibraltar, written as Kipalaleka or Gibaraleta. While [z] and [ɡ] are not regarded as Hawaiian sounds, [b], [ɹ], and [t] were represented in the original alphabet, so the letters (b, r, and t) for the latter are not truly "non-Hawaiian" or "foreign", even though their post-1826 use in published matter generally marked words of foreign origin.

=== Glottal stop ===
ʻOkina (ʻoki 'cut' + -na '-ing') is the modern Hawaiian name for the symbol (a letter) that represents the glottal stop. It was formerly known as ʻuʻina ("snap").

For examples of the ʻokina, consider the Hawaiian words Hawaiʻi and Oʻahu (often simply Hawaii and Oahu in English orthography). In Hawaiian, these words are pronounced [hʌˈʋʌi.ʔi] and [oˈʔʌ.hu], and are written with an ʻokina where the glottal stop is pronounced.

Elbert & Pukui's Hawaiian Grammar says "The glottal stop, ‘, is made by closing the glottis or space between the vocal cords, the result being something like the hiatus in English oh-oh."

==== History ====
As early as 1823, the missionaries made some limited use of the apostrophe to represent the glottal stop, but they did not make it a letter of the alphabet. In publishing the Hawaiian Bible, they used it to distinguish koʻu ('my') from kou ('your'). In 1864, William DeWitt Alexander published a grammar of Hawaiian in which he made it clear that the glottal stop (calling it "guttural break") is definitely a true consonant of the Hawaiian language. He wrote it using an apostrophe. In 1922, the Andrews-Parker dictionary of Hawaiian made limited use of the opening single quote symbol, then called "reversed apostrophe" or "inverse comma", to represent the glottal stop. Subsequent dictionaries and written material associated with the Hawaiian language revitalization have preferred to use this symbol, the ʻokina, to better represent spoken Hawaiian. Nonetheless, excluding the ʻokina may facilitate interface with English-oriented media, or even be preferred stylistically by some Hawaiian speakers, in homage to 19th century written texts. So there is variation today in the use of this symbol.

==== Electronic encoding ====
»ʻŌlelo Hawaiʻi« (Hawaiian: Hawaiian language) within single quotes set in Gentium Book typeface. In the second line, the character-variant option for large apostrophe-like letters is set. The glyph of the two ʻokinas is clearly different from that of the opening quote.

The ʻokina is written in various ways for electronic uses:

- U+02BB ʻ MODIFIER LETTER TURNED COMMA. This does not always have the correct appearance because it is not supported in some fonts.
- U+2018 ‘ LEFT SINGLE QUOTATION MARK. In many fonts this character looks like either a left-leaning single quotation mark or a quotation mark thicker at the bottom than at the top. In more traditional serif fonts such as Times New Roman it can look like a very small "6" with the circle filled in black: ‘.

Because many people who want to write the ʻokina are not familiar with these specific characters and/or do not have access to the appropriate fonts and input and display systems, it is sometimes written with more familiar and readily available characters:

- U+0027 ' APOSTROPHE, following the missionary tradition.
- U+0060 ` GRAVE ACCENT,
- U+2019 ’ RIGHT SINGLE QUOTATION MARK

=== Macron ===
A modern Hawaiian name for the macron symbol is kahakō (kaha 'mark' + kō 'long'). It was formerly known as mekona (Hawaiianization of macron). It can be written as a diacritical mark which looks like a hyphen or dash written above a vowel, i.e., ā ē ī ō ū and Ā Ē Ī Ō Ū. It is used to show that the marked vowel is a "double", or "geminate", or "long" vowel, in phonological terms. (See: Vowel length)

As early as 1821, at least one of the missionaries, Hiram Bingham, was using macrons (and breves) in making handwritten transcriptions of Hawaiian vowels. The missionaries specifically requested their sponsor in Boston to send them some type (fonts) with accented vowel characters, including vowels with macrons, but the sponsor made only one response and sent the wrong font size (pica instead of small pica). Thus, they could not print ā, ē, ī, ō, nor ū (at the right size), even though they wanted to.

=== Pronunciation ===
Owing to extensive allophony, Hawaiian has more than 13 phones. Although vowel length is phonemic, long vowels are not always pronounced as such, even though under the rules for assigning stress in Hawaiian, a long vowel will always receive stress.

== Phonology ==
=== Consonants ===
Consonants
	Labial	Lingual	Glottal
Nasal	m	n	
Plosive	p ~ b	t ~ k (Note: Today, the use of /t/ is predominantly found in the Niʻihau dialect, though it exists generally in some words within Standard Hawaiian such as tūtū 'grandparent'. The grapheme ⟨t⟩ is historically attested across all Hawaiian dialects.)	ʔ
Continuant	w ~ v	l ~ ɾ ~ ɹ	h

Hawaiian is known for having very few consonant phonemes, only eight in total (though several with allophonic variation): /m, n, p ~ b, t ~ k, ʔ, w ~ v, l ~ ɾ ~ ɹ, h/. It has allophonic variation of [t] with [k], [w] with [v], and (in some dialects) [l] with [n]. The [t ~ k] variation is quite unusual among the world's languages, and is likely a product both of the small number of consonants in Hawaiian, and the recent shift of historical *t to modern [t ~ k], after historical *k had shifted to [ʔ]. In some dialects, /ʔ/ remains as [k] in some words. These variations are largely free, though there are conditioning factors. /l/ tends to [n], as with ʻeleʻele or ʻeneʻene "black", especially in words with both /l/ and /n/, as in the island name Lānaʻi ([laːˈnɐʔi ~ naːˈnɐʔi]). The [k] allophone is almost universal at the beginnings of words, whereas [t] is most common before the vowel /i/. [v] is the norm after /i/ and /e/, whereas [w] is usual after /u/ and /o/. After /a/ and initially, however, [w] and [v] are in free variation.

=== Vowels ===
Hawaiian has five short and five long vowels, plus diphthongs.

==== Monophthongs ====
Monophthongs
	Short		Long	
	Front	Back	Front	Back
Close	i	u	iː	uː
Mid	ɛ ~ e	o	eː	oː
Open	a ~ ɐ ~ ə		aː	

Hawaiian has five pure vowels. The short vowels are /u, i, o, e, a/, and the long vowels, if they are considered separate phonemes rather than simply sequences of like vowels, are /uː, iː, oː, eː, aː/. When stressed, short /e/ and /a/ have been described as becoming [ɛ] and [ɐ], while when unstressed they are [e] and [ə]. Parker Jones (2017), however, did not find a reduction of /a/ to [ə] outside of function words in the phonetic analysis of a young speaker from Hilo, Hawaiʻi, who had been raised within the Hawaiian language revitalisation movement; therefore, there is at least some variation in how /a/ is realised. /e/ also tends to become [ɛ] next to /l/, /n/, and another [ɛ], as in Pele [pɛlɛ]. Some grammatical particles vary between short and long vowels. These include a and o "of", ma "at", na and no "for". Between a back vowel /o/ or /u/ and a following non-back vowel (/a e i/), there is an epenthetic [w], which is generally not written. Between a front vowel /e/ or /i/ and a following non-front vowel (/a o u/), there is an epenthetic [j] (a y sound), which is never written.

==== Diphthongs ====
Short diphthongs
		Ending with...			
		/u/	/i/	/o/	/e/
Starting with...	/i/	iu			
Starting with...	/o/	ou	oi		
Starting with...	/e/	eu	ei		
Starting with...	/a/	au	ai	ao	ae

The short-vowel diphthongs are /iu, ou, oi, eu, ei, au, ai, ao, ae/. In all except perhaps /iu/, these are falling diphthongs. However, they are not as tightly bound as the diphthongs of English, and may be considered vowel sequences. (The second vowel in such sequences may receive the stress, but in such cases it is not counted as a diphthong.) In fast speech, /ai/ tends to [ei] and /au/ tends to [ou], conflating these diphthongs with /ei/ and /ou/.

There are only a limited number of vowels which may follow long vowels, and some authors treat these sequences as diphthongs as well: /oːu, eːi, aːu, aːi, aːo, aːe/.

Long diphthongs
		Ending with...			
		/u/	/i/	/o/	/e/
Starting with...	/o/	oːu			
Starting with...	/e/		eːi		
Starting with...	/a/	aːu	aːi	aːo	aːe

=== Phonotactics ===
Hawaiian syllable structure is (C)V. All CV syllables occur except for wū; wu occurs only in two words borrowed from English. As shown by Schütz, Hawaiian word-stress is predictable in words of one to three moras, but not in words of five or more syllables. Hawaiian phonological processes include palatalization and deletion of consonants, as well as raising, diphthongization, deletion, and compensatory lengthening of vowels.

=== Historical development ===
Historically, glottal stop developed from *k. Loss of intervocalic consonant phonemes has resulted in Hawaiian long vowels and diphthongs.

== Grammar ==
Hawaiian is an analytic language with verb–subject–object word order. While there is no use of inflection for verbs, in Hawaiian, like other Austronesian personal pronouns, declension is found in the differentiation between a- and o-class genitive case personal pronouns in order to indicate inalienable possession in a binary possessive class system. Also like many Austronesian languages, Hawaiian pronouns employ separate words for inclusive and exclusive we (clusivity), and distinguish singular, dual, and plural. The grammatical function of verbs is marked by adjacent particles (short words) and by their relative positions, that indicate tense–aspect–mood.

Some examples of verb phrase patterns:

- ua verb – perfective
- e verb ana – imperfective
- ke verb nei – present progressive
- e verb – imperative
- mai verb – negative imperative
- i verb – purposive
- ke verb – infinitive

Nouns can be marked with articles:

- ka honu (the turtle)
- nā honu (the turtles)
- ka hale (the house)
- ke kanaka (the person)

ka and ke are singular definite articles. ke is used before words beginning with a-, e-, o- and k-, and with some words beginning ʻ- and p-. ka is used in all other cases. nā is the plural definite article.

To show part of a group, the word kekahi is used. To show a bigger part, mau is inserted to pluralize the subject.

Examples:

- kekahi pipi (one of the cows)
- kekahi mau pipi (some of the cows)

=== Semantic domains ===
Hawaiian has thousands of words for elements of the natural world. According to Ulukau, the Hawaiian Electronic Library, there are thousands of names for different types of wind, rain, parts of the sea, peaks of mountains, and sky formations. For example, "Hoʻomalumalu" means "sheltering cloud" and "Hoʻoweliweli" means "threatening cloud".

== Varieties and debates ==
There is a marked difference between varieties of the Hawaiian language spoken by most native Hawaiian elders and the Hawaiian Language taught in education, sometimes regarded as "University Hawaiian" or "College Hawaiian". "University Hawaiian" is often so different from the language spoken by elders that Native Hawaiian children may feel scared or ashamed to speak Hawaiian at home, limiting the language's domains to academia. Language varieties spoken by elders often includes Pidgin Hawaiian, Hawaiian Pidgin, Hawaiian-infused English, or another variety of Hawaiian that is much different from the "University Hawaiian" that was standardized and documented by colonists in the 19th century.

The divide between "University Hawaiian" and varieties spoken by elders has created debate over which variety of Hawaiian should be considered "real" or "authentic", as neither "University Hawaiian" nor other varieties spoken by elders are free from foreign interference. Hawaiian cultural beliefs of divine intervention as the driving force of language formation expedites distrust in what might be seen as the mechanical nature of colonial linguistic paradigms of language and its role in the standardized variety of "University Hawaiian". Hawaiian's authenticity debate could have major implications for revitalization efforts as language attitudes and trends in existing language domains are both UNESCO factors in assessing a language's level of endangerment.

== Language learning resources ==
Hawaiian can be learnt on the online platforms of Duolingo and Mango Languages.

== Sample text ==
Article 1 of the Universal Declaration of Human Rights in Hawaiian:

=== Paukū 1 ===
Hānau kūʻokoʻa ʻia nā kānaka apau loa, a ua kau like ka hanohano a me nā pono kīwila ma luna o kākou pākahi. Ua kuʻu mai ka noʻonoʻo pono a me ka ʻike pono ma luna o kākou, no laila, e aloha kākou kekahi i kekahi.

Article 1 of the Universal Declaration of Human Rights in English:

All human beings are born free and equal in dignity and rights. They are endowed with reason and conscience and should act towards one another in a spirit of brotherhood.

== See also ==
- The list of Hawaiian words and list of words of Hawaiian origin at Wiktionary, a free dictionary and Wikipedia sibling project
- Languages of the United States
- List of English words of Hawaiian origin
- Pidgin Hawaiian (not to be confused with Hawaiian Pidgin)
