= Māori Braille =

Braille alphabet of the Māori language

- Script type: alphabet
- Print basis: Māori alphabet
- Languages: Māori

Related scripts
- Parent systems: Braille: English Braille; Māori Braille

Māori Braille is the braille alphabet of the Māori language. It takes the letter wh from English Braille, and has an additional letter to mark long vowels. (Hawaiian Braille uses the same convention for its long vowels.) When Unified English Braille was adopted by New Zealand, it was determined that Māori Braille was compatible, and would continue to be used unchanged.

The following letters and digraphs are therefore used beyond the letters of the basic Latin alphabet:

⠱ (braille pattern dots-156)	⠸ (braille pattern dots-456) ⠁ (braille pattern dots-1)	⠸ (braille pattern dots-456) ⠑ (braille pattern dots-15)	⠸ (braille pattern dots-456) ⠊ (braille pattern dots-24)	⠸ (braille pattern dots-456) ⠕ (braille pattern dots-135)	⠸ (braille pattern dots-456) ⠥ (braille pattern dots-136)
wh	ā	ē	ī	ō	ū

Ng is written ⠝⠛, as in print.

Punctuation is as in English Braille.
