= Niʻihau dialect =

Variety of the Hawaiian language spoken on Niihau Island, Hawaii

Niʻihau
- Olelo Matuahine, Olelo Kanaka Niʻihau
- Native to: Hawaiʻi
- Region: Niʻihau, Kauaʻi
- Ethnicity: Hawaiians
- Native speakers: 84–110 (2024)
- Language family: Austronesian: Malayo-Polynesian; Oceanic; Polynesian; Eastern Polynesian; Marquesic; Hawaiian; Niʻihau
- Writing system: Latin

Language codes
- ISO 639-3: –
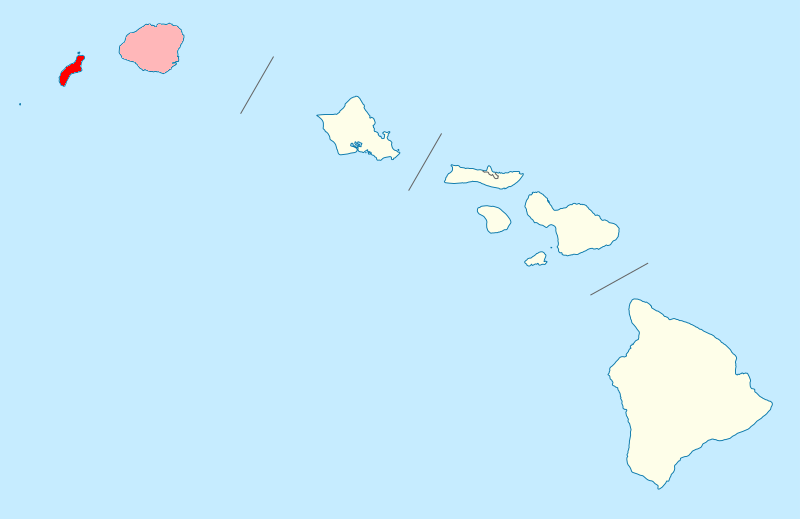
- The dialect is native to Niʻihau (dark red) and a significant Niʻihau diaspora that lives on Kauaʻi (light red).

The Niʻihau dialect (Standard Hawaiian: ʻŌlelo Niʻihau, Niʻihau: Olelo Matuahine, lit. 'mother tongue') is a variety of the Hawaiian language spoken on the island of Niʻihau, more specifically in its only settlement Puʻuwai, and on the island of Kauaʻi around Kekaha where descendants of families from Niʻihau now live. Today, the Niʻihau variety of Hawaiian is taught in Ke Kula Niihau O Kekaha.

== Extent ==
Today, families with ancestry in Niʻihau who now on western Kauaʻi speak a similar variety to that spoken on Niʻihau, but some speakers refer to the speakers of the dialect outside of Niʻihau as speakers of Olelo Kauaʻi.

== Phonology ==
=== Consonants ===
Consonants
	Labial	Alveolar	Velar	Glottal
Nasal	m	n		
Plosive	p	t ~ k		ʔ
Fricative				h
Sonorant	w ~ v	l ~ ɾ		

Unlike the Hawaiian taught in schools, the Niʻihau dialect maintains the variation between [ɾ] and [l], in addition to [t] and [k]. Some other pockets of speakers on Molokai and Maui have also been found to maintain the [t] variant. While in the 1950s the Niʻihau dialect had free variation between [t] and [k], recent observations suggest that [t] and [k] are currently found in largely complementary distribution in the modern Niʻihau dialect. The [k] allophone appears when before other syllables containing the [t] allophone: thus Niʻihau has ketahi 'one', kātou 'we (inclusive)', makahiti 'year', where standard Hawaiian has kekahi, kākou, and makahiki.

This pattern of dissimilation is also extended to some loanwords. For example, the English word 'cook' is reflected in Niʻihau Hawaiian as kute, even though the word 'cook' does not have a [t] in English.

The [k] allophone, represented in standard Hawaiian and the Hawaiian alphabet, is prestigious and associated with reading styles. The Bible in particular is always read with [k]. The dissimilation pattern in colloquial Niʻihau may be due to an effort to preserve the Niʻihau dialect's distinctiveness from standard Hawaiian.

=== Vowels ===
Like the Hawaiian taught in universities, ʻŌlelo Niʻihau has five short and five long vowels, plus diphthongs.

==== Monophthongs ====
Monophthongs
	Short		Long	
	Front	Back	Front	Back
Close	i	u	iː	uː
Mid	ɛ ~ e	o	eː	oː
Open	a ~ ɐ ~ ə		aː	

Niʻihau retains the five pure vowels characteristic of Hawaiian with few changes. The short vowels are /u, i, o, e, a/, and the long vowels, if they are considered separate phonemes rather than simply sequences of like vowels, are /uː, iː, oː, eː, aː/. When stressed, short /e/ and /a/ have been described as becoming [ɛ] and [ɐ], while when unstressed they are [e] and [ə]. Parker Jones, however, did not find a reduction of /a/ to [ə] in the phonetic analysis of a young speaker from Hilo, Hawaiʻi; so there is at least some variation in how /a/ is realised. /e/ also tends to become [ɛ] next to /l/, /n/, and another [ɛ], as in Pele [pɛlɛ]. Some grammatical particles vary between short and long vowels. These include a and o "of", ma "at", na and no "for". Between a back vowel /o/ or /u/ and a following non-back vowel (/a e i/), there is an epenthetic [w], which is generally not written. Between a front vowel /e/ or /i/ and a following non-front vowel (/a o u/), there is an epenthetic [j] (a y sound), which is never written.

==== Diphthongs ====
Short diphthongs
	Ending with /u/	Ending with /i/	Ending with /o/	Ending with /e/
Starting with /i/	iu			
Starting with /o/	ou	oi		
Starting with /e/	eu	ei		
Starting with /a/	au	ai	ao	ae

The short-vowel diphthongs are /iu, ou, oi, eu, ei, au, ai, ao, ae/. In all except perhaps /iu/, these are falling diphthongs. However, they are not as tightly bound as the diphthongs of English, and may be considered vowel sequences. (The second vowel in such sequences may receive the stress, but in such cases it is not counted as a diphthong.) In fast speech, /ai/ tends to [ei] and /au/ tends to [ou], conflating these diphthongs with /ei/ and /ou/.

There are only a limited number of vowels which may follow long vowels, and some authors treat these sequences as diphthongs as well: /oːu, eːi, aːu, aːi, aːo, aːe/.

Long diphthongs
	Ending with /u/	Ending with /i/	Ending with /o/	Ending with /e/
Starting with /o/	oːu			
Starting with /e/		eːi		
Starting with /a/	aːu	aːi	aːo	aːe

=== Speech tempo ===
Research done by Newman (1951) suggests Niʻihau dialect is among the fastest spoken Hawaiian dialects. He reported a Niʻihau woman having a reading speed of 170 words per minute whereas a man from Kalapana read at a slower 120.

The fast pace of the Niʻihau dialect causes a number of phonemic reductions. Newman lists three examples of this phenomenon:

English	Standard Haw.	Niʻihau dialect
'living'	noho ʻana	nooana
'two of my sisters'	ʻelua oʻu kika	elu aʻu tita
'one room'	hoʻokahi lumi	hoʻotaii lumi

=== Diacritics ===
Niʻihau dialect does not use an ʻokina to represent glottal stops nor a kahakō (macron) to indicate long vowels. The Hawaiian word /ʔoːlelo/ ("language") is spelt olelo in Niʻihau and ʻōlelo in Standard Hawaiian.

== Bibliography ==
- Blust, Robert (2004). "*t to k: An Austronesian Sound Change Revisited". Oceanic Linguistics. 43 (2): 365–410. doi:10.1353/ol.2005.0001. ISSN 0029-8115. JSTOR 3623363. S2CID 143013834.
