= Proto-Austronesian language =

Reconstructed ancestor of the Austronesian languages

Proto-Austronesian
- PAN; PAn
- Reconstruction of: Austronesian
- Region: Formosa (main island of Taiwan)
- Era: c. 4000 BCE – c. 3500 BCE
- Reconstructed ancestor: Proto-Austro-Tai (proposed)
- Lower-order reconstructions: Proto-Atayalic; Proto-Bunun; Proto-East Formosan; Proto-Malayo-Polynesian; Proto-Northwest Formosan; Proto-Paiwan; Proto-Puyuma; Proto-Rukai; Proto-Tsouic; Proto-Western Plains

Proto-Austronesian (commonly abbreviated as PAN or PAn) is a proto-language. It is the reconstructed ancestor of the Austronesian languages, one of the world's major language families. Proto-Austronesian is assumed to have begun to diversify c. 4000 BCE – c. 3500 BCE in Taiwan.

Lower-level reconstructions have also been made, and include Proto-Malayo-Polynesian, Proto-Oceanic, and Proto-Polynesian. In the last three decades, linguists Malcolm Ross and Andrew Pawley have built a large lexicon for Proto-Oceanic. Other comparative lexicons include the Micronesian comparative dictionary (by Bender et al.), and the Polynesian lexicon or Pollex (by Biggs et al.).

== Phonology ==
Proto-Austronesian is reconstructed by constructing sets of correspondences among consonants in the various Austronesian languages, according to the comparative method. Although in theory the result should be unambiguous, in practice, given the large number of languages, there are numerous disagreements, with various scholars differing significantly on the number and nature of the phonemes in Proto-Austronesian. In the past, some disagreements concerned whether certain correspondence sets were real or represent sporadic developments in particular languages. For the currently remaining disagreements, however, scholars generally accept the validity of the correspondence sets but disagree on the extent to which the distinctions in these sets can be projected back to proto-Austronesian or represent innovations in particular sets of daughter languages.

=== Blust's reconstruction ===
Below are Proto-Austronesian phonemes reconstructed by Robert Blust, a professor of linguistics at the University of Hawaii at Manoa. A total of 25 Proto-Austronesian consonants, 4 vowels, and 4 diphthongs were reconstructed. However, Blust acknowledges that some of the reconstructed consonants are still controversial and debated.

The symbols below are frequently used in reconstructed Proto-Austronesian words.

- *C: voiceless alveolar affricate
- *c: voiceless palatal affricate
- *q: uvular stop
- *z: voiced palatal affricate
- *D: voiced retroflex stop
- *j: palatalized voiced velar stop
- *S: voiceless alveolar sibilant fricative
- *s: voiceless palatal sibilant fricative
- *N: palatalized alveolar lateral or palatal lateral
- *r: alveolar flap
- *R: alveolar trill

Proto-Austronesian Consonants (Blust)
		Labial	Alveolar	Retroflex	Palatal	Velar	Uvular	Glottal
Stop	voiceless	p /p/	t /t/			k /k/	q /q/	
Stop	voiced	b /b/	d /d/	D /ɖ/	j /ɡʲ/ (Note: Blust lists the palatalized voiced velar stop among the palatal series.)	g /ɡ/		
Affricate	voiceless		C /t͡s/		c /t͡ʃ/ (Note: Blust uses the symbol for the voiceless postalveolar affricate ⟨tʃ⟩ to write *c. The other members of the palatal series are written similarly here.)			
Affricate	voiced				z /d͡ʒ/			
Nasal		m /m/	n /n/		ñ /ɲ/	ŋ /ŋ/		
Fricative			S /s/		s /ʃ/			h /h/
Lateral			l /l/		N /ʎ/ (Note: Blust variously describes this phoneme as a palatalized alveolar lateral and "probably a palatal lateral".)			
Tap			r /ɾ/					
Trill			R /r/					
Approximant		w /w/			y /j/			

*D appears only in final position, *z/*c/*ñ only in initial and medial position, while *j is restricted to medial and final position.

Proto-Austronesian Vowels (Blust)
Height	Front	Central	Back
Close	i /i/		u /u/
Mid		e /ə/	
Open		a /a/	

The diphthongs are not distinct phonemes, but vowel-glide sequences. They deserve special mention due to their subsequent monophthongization in many daughter languages. The diphthongs include:

- *ay
- *aw
- *uy
- *iw

=== Wolff's reconstruction ===
In 2010, John Wolff published his Proto-Austronesian reconstruction in Proto-Austronesian phonology with glossary. Wolff reconstructs a total of 19 consonants, 4 vowels (*i, *u, *a, *e, where *e = /ə/), 4 diphthongs (*ay, *aw, *iw, *uy), and syllabic stress.

Proto-Austronesian Consonants (Wolff)
	Labial	Alveolar	Palatal	Velar	Uvular	Glottal
Unvoiced stop	p /p/	t /t/	c /c/	k /k/	q /q/	
Voiced stop/fricative	b /b/	d /d/	j /ɟ/	g /ɡ/	ɣ /ʁ/	
Nasal	m /m/	n /n/		ŋ /ŋ/		
Voiceless fricative		s /s/				h /h/
Lateral		l /l/	ɬ /ʎ/			
Approximant	w /w/		y /j/			

The following table shows how Wolff's Proto-Austronesian phonemic system differs from Blust's system.

Blust's and Wolff's PAn phonemes
Blust	*p	*t	*C	*c	*k	*q	*b	*‑D	*d‑ *‑d‑	*‑d	*z‑ *‑z‑	*‑j- *‑j	*g‑	*‑g- *‑g	*R	*m	*n	*N	*ñ	*ŋ	*l	*r	*s	*S	*h	*w	*y
Wolff	*p	*t		rejected	*k	*q	*b	*‑d	*d‑ *‑d‑	*‑j	*j‑ *‑j‑	*g		rejected	*ɣ	*m	*n	*ɬ		*ŋ	*l	rejected	*c	*s	*h	*w	*y

However, Blust was critical of Wolff's attempts to merge *t and *C, as it depends on the reconstruction of phonemic stress in the proto-language, and he believed such a reconstruction is questionable.

=== Shibata's reconstruction ===
In 2025, Kye Shibata made several changes to reconstructed Proto-Austronesian phonology based on an examination of Formosan reflexes, recasting the reconstruction of Proto-Austronesian in terms of a contrast between dental and retroflex phonemes.

Proto-Austronesian Consonants (Shibata)
	Labial	Dental	Retroflex	Palatal	Velar	Uvular	Glottal
Voiceless stop	p /p/	t /t̪/	C /ʈ/		k /k/	q /q/	(/ʔ/)
Voiced stop	b /b/	z /d̪/	d /ɖ/		(g /ɡ/)		
Nasal	m /m/	n /n/			ŋ /ŋ/		
Voiceless fricative		s /s̪/	S /ʂ/		(S /x/)		h /ħ/
Voiced fricative				j /ʝ/			
Lateral		N /l̪/	l /ɭ/				
Trill		R /r/					
Approximant	w /w/			y /j/			

Shibata eliminates *D, *c, and *ñ as distinct phonemes, due to their rarity in the lexicon and their distinction mostly being confined to Malayo-Polynesian. However, Shibata suggests the possibility of splitting *S into two phonemes following Ross, and further suggests that support for *g is limited as it only appears in a limited number of words.

=== Historical overview of reconstructions for Proto-Austronesian ===
According to Malcolm Ross, the following aspects of Blust's system are uncontroversial: the labials (p b m w); the velars k ŋ; y; R; the vowels; and the above four diphthongs. There is some disagreement about the postvelars (q ʔ h) and the velars g j, and about whether there are any more diphthongs; however, in these respects, Ross and Blust are in agreement. The major disagreement concerns the system of coronal consonants. The following discussion is based on Ross (1992).

Otto Dempwolff's reconstruction of Proto-Malayo-Polynesian from the 1930s included:

- Dental t d n l
- Retroflex ṭ ḍ ḷ
- Palatal t' d' n'
- Palatal k' g'

Dyen (1963), including data from the Formosan languages, expanded Dempwolff's set of coronal consonants:

- t split into t and C
- n split into n and L/N
- d' split and renotated as z and Z
- t' split into s_{1} and s_{2}
- ḷ ṭ ḍ n' k' g' h renotated as r T D ñ c j q

Tsuchida (1976), building on Dyen's system:

- Further split d into D_{1} D_{2} D_{3} D_{4}. He also believed that Dyen's c (Dempwolff's k') could not be reconstructed for Proto-Austronesian (he also split Dyen's w into w W and q into q Q, which were not accepted by later scholars.)

Dahl reduced Tsuchida's consonants into:

- D_{1} D_{2} D_{3} D_{4} into d_{3} d_{2} d_{1} d_{3} (with the new d_{3} reflecting the combination of the old D_{1} and D_{4}) and combined Dyen's S X x into a single phoneme S. He did accept Dyen's c but did not accept his T D. (He also renotated a number of phonemes in ways that were not generally accepted by later scholars.)

Blust based his system on a combination of Dyen, Tsuchida and Dahl, and attempted to reduce the total number of phonemes. He accepted Dahl's reduction of Dyen's S X x into S but did not accept either Tsuchida's or Dahl's split of Dyen's d; in addition, he reduced Dyen's s_{1} s_{2} to a single phoneme s. While accepting Dyen's c, he was hesitant about T and D (more recently, Blust appears to have accepted D but rejected T, and also rejected Z).

Ross likewise attempted to reduce the number of phonemes, but in a different way:

- He accepts Dahl's d_{1} d_{2} d_{3} and also Z (eventually rejected by Blust). He notes that the distinction between d_{1} and d_{2} d_{3} is only reconstructable for the Formosan language groups Amis, Proto-Puyuma and Proto-Paiwan, and only Proto-Paiwan has a three-way distinction among d_{1} d_{2} d_{3}; contrarily the distinction between Z and d_{1} is reconstructable only for Proto-Rukai and Proto-Malayo-Polynesian, but not any of the previous three groups. However, he still believes (contra Blust) that the distinction among these phonemes is an inheritance from Proto-Austronesian rather than an innovation in the respective groups.
- He notes that d_{1} occurs only morpheme-initially, while r occurs only morpheme-non-initially, and as a result combines the two.
- He does not accept the phonemes c z ñ in Proto-Austronesian, and asserts that none of them are "readily reconstructable" outside of Proto-Malayo-Polynesian. Furthermore, while he believes that ñ was a general innovation in Proto-Malayo-Polynesian, c and z "are reflected differently from PMP [Proto-Malayo-Polynesian] *s and *d only in a fairly limited area of western Indo-Malaysia and appear to be the results of local developments".
- He also reconstructs the coronals somewhat differently. He believes that C S l d_{3} were all retroflex (respectively, /tʂ/; /ʂ/ or /ʃ/; /ɭ/ or /ɽ/; /ɖ/), and s and L (Blust's N) were dental /s/ and /l/, as opposed to Blust's reconstruction as dental and palatal, respectively. According to Ross, this is based on their outcomes in the Formosan languages and Javanese; although their outcomes as dental/palatal is geographically more distributed, it occurs only in Malayo-Polynesian, which represent a single clade with respect to the Formosan languages.

== Sound changes ==
As Proto-Austronesian transitioned to Proto-Malayo-Polynesian, Proto-Oceanic, and Proto-Polynesian, the phonemic inventories were continually reduced by merging formerly distinct sounds into one sound. Three mergers were observed in the Proto-Austronesian to Proto-Malayo-Polynesian transition, while nine were observed for the Proto-Oceanic to Proto-Polynesian transition. Thus, Proto-Austronesian has the most elaborate sound system, while Proto-Polynesian has the fewest phonemes. For instance, the Hawaiian language is famous for having only eight consonants, while Māori has only ten consonants. This is a sharp reduction from the 19–25 consonants of the Proto-Austronesian language that was originally spoken on Taiwan.

Blust also observed the following mergers and sound changes between Proto-Austronesian and Proto-Malayo-Polynesian.

Proto-Austronesian and Proto-Malayo-Polynesian Sound Changes
Proto-Austronesian	Proto-Malayo-Polynesian
*C/t	*t
*N/n	*n
*S/h	*h
*eS	*ah

However, according to Wolff (2010:241), Proto-Malayo-Polynesian's development from Proto-Austronesian only included the following three sound changes.

- PAn *ɬ > PMP *ñ, l, n
- PAn *s > PMP *h
- PAn *h > PMP *Ø

Proto-Oceanic merged even more phonemes. This is why modern-day Polynesian languages have some of the most restricted consonant inventories in the world.

Proto-Malayo-Polynesian and Proto-Oceanic Sound Changes
Proto-Malayo-Polynesian	Proto-Oceanic
*b/p	*p
*mb/mp	*b
*c/s/z/j	*s
*nc/nd/nz/nj	*j
*g/k	*k
*ŋg/ŋk	*g
*d/r	*r
*e/-aw	*o
*i/-uy/-iw	*i

Unusual sound changes that occurred within the Austronesian language family include:

- Proto-Malayo-Polynesian *w or *b > Sundanese c- or -nc-
- Proto-Oceanic *w or *y > p in Levei Khehek
- Proto-Oceanic *r or *R > g͡ʟ in Hiw
- Proto-Polynesian *l or *r > ŋg (via *ɣ or *ʁ) in Rennellese
- Proto-Polynesian *t > k in Hawaiian, Samoan, and Ontong Java (after *k > ʔ)

== Syntax ==
=== Word order ===
Proto-Austronesian was a verb-initial language (including VSO and VOS word orders), as most Formosan languages, all Philippine languages, some Bornean languages, all Austronesian dialects of Madagascar, and all Polynesian languages are verb-initial. However, most Austronesian (many of which are Oceanic) languages of Indonesia, New Guinea, New Caledonia, Vanuatu, the Solomon Islands, and Micronesia are SVO, or verb-medial, languages. SOV, or verb-final, word order is considered to be typologically unusual for Austronesian languages, and is only found in various Austronesian languages of New Guinea and to a more limited extent, the Solomon Islands. This is because SOV word order is very common in the non-Austronesian Papuan languages.

=== Voice system ===
The Austronesian languages of Taiwan, Borneo, Madagascar and the Philippines are also well known for their unusual morphosyntactic alignment, which is known as the symmetrical voice (also known as the Austronesian alignment). This alignment was also present in the Proto-Austronesian language. Unlike Proto-Austronesian, however, Proto-Oceanic syntax does not make use of the focus morphology present in Austronesian-aligned languages such as the Philippine languages. In the Polynesian languages, verbal morphology is relatively simple, while the main unit in a sentence is the phrase rather than the word.

Below is a table of John Wolff's Proto-Austronesian voice system as cited in Blust (2013). Wolff's "four-voice" system was derived from evidence in various Formosan and Philippine languages.

Proto-Austronesian voice system
	Independent (non-past)	Independent (past)	Future-general action	Dependent	Subjunctive
Actor voice	-um-	-inum-	?	ø	-a
Direct passive	-en	-in-	r- -en	-a	?
Local passive	-an	-in-an	r- -an	-i	-ay
Instrumental passive	Si-	Si- -in- (?)	?	-an (?)	?

However, Ross (2009) notes that what may be the most divergent languages, Tsou, Rukai, and Puyuma, are not addressed by this reconstruction, which therefore cannot claim to be the alignment system of the protolanguage of the entire family. He calls the unit to which this reconstruction applies Nuclear Austronesian.

=== Interrogatives and case markers ===
The following table compares Proto-Austronesian and Proto-Malayo-Polynesian question words.

Proto-Austronesian and Proto-Malayo-Polynesian question words
English	Proto-Austronesian	Proto-Malayo-Polynesian
what	*(n)-anu	*apa
who	*(si)-ima	*i-sai
where	*i-nu	*i nu
when	*ija-n	*p-ijan
how	*(n)-anu	*ku(j)a
how much	*pijax	*pija

Currently, the most complete reconstruction of the Proto-Austronesian case marker system is offered by Malcolm Ross. The reconstructed case markers are as follows:

Proto-Austronesian case markers
	Common nouns	Singular personal nouns	Plural personal nouns
Neutral	*[y]a, *u	*i	–
Nominative	*k-a	*k-u	–
Genitive	*n-a, *n-u	*n-i	*n-i-a
Accusative	*C-a, *C-u	*C-i	–
Oblique	*s-a, *s-u	–	–
Locative	*d-a	–	–

Important Proto-Austronesian grammatical words include the ligature *na and locative *i.

== Morphology ==
Morphology and syntax are often hard to separate in the Austronesian languages, particularly the Philippine languages. This is because the morphology of the verbs often affects how the rest of the sentence would be constructed (i.e., syntax). Proto-Austronesian was an agglutinative language like most of its daughter languages, and it possessed an unusual consonant structure of CV(C)CVC.

=== Affixes ===
Below are some Proto-Austronesian affixes (including prefixes, infixes, and suffixes) reconstructed by Robert Blust. For instance, *pa- was used for non-stative (i.e., dynamic) causatives, while *pa-ka was used for stative causatives (Blust 2009:282). Blust also noted a p/m pairing phenomenon in which many affixes have both p- and m- forms. This system is especially elaborate in the Thao language of Taiwan.

Proto-Austronesian Affixes
Affix	Gloss
*ka-	inchoative (Formosan only), stative, past time, accompanied action/person, abstract noun formative, manner in which an action is carried out, past participle
*ma-	stative, future time (Formosan only)
*maka-	abilitative/aptative
*maki/paki	petitive (petitioning for something)
*mi-	possession (Formosan only)
*mu-	movement
*pa(-ka-)	causative
*pi-	causative of location
*pu-	causative of movement
*qali/kali-	sensitive connection with the spirit world
*Sa-	instrumental noun
*Si-	instrumental voice
*-an	instrumental voice: imperative
*Sika-	ordinal numeral
*taʀ-/ta-	sudden, unexpected, or accidental action
*-um-	actor voice: transitivity, etc.
*-in-	perfective, nominalizer
*-ar-	plural
*-an	locative voice
*-i	locative voice: imperative
*-en	patient voice
*-a	patient voice: imperative
*-ay	future
*ka- -an	adversative passive, abstract nouns
*-ta	1st person plural inclusive, genitive suffix

A verbal prefix *paRi- is also reconstructed (albeit at the lower level of PEMP), for "reciprocal or collective action"; it is particularly developed in Oceanic languages.

=== Reduplication ===
CV (consonant + vowel) reduplication is very common among the Austronesian languages. In Proto-Austronesian, Ca-reduplicated (consonant + /a/) numbers were used to count humans, while the non-reduplicated sets were used to count non-human and inanimate objects. CV-reduplication was also used to nominalize verbs in Proto-Austronesian. In Ilocano, CV-reduplication is used to pluralize nouns.

Reduplication patterns include (Blust 2009):

- Full reduplication
- Full reduplication plus affixation
- Full reduplication minus the coda
- Full reduplication minus the last vowel
- Full reduplication with vocalic or consonantal change, or both
- Full reduplication with consecutive identical syllables
- Prefixal foot reduplication/leftward reduplication
- Suffixal foot reduplication/rightward reduplication
- CVC-reduplication
- CV-reduplication (marks durative aspect, collectivity, or intensity in Bunun; future in Tagalog)
- CV-reduplication plus affixation
- Ca-reduplication (used to derive human-counting numerals and deverbal instrumental nouns in Thao and Puyuma)
- Extensions of fixed segmentism
- Reduplicative infixes
- Suffixal syllable reduplication

Other less common patterns are (Blust 2009):

- Vacuous reduplication (occurs in Paamese)
- Full reduplication minus the initial (occurs in Anejom of southern Vanuatu)
- Full reduplication plus an initial glide (occurs in Kosraean)
- Partial reduplication minus initial glottal stop (occurs in Rennellese)
- True CV-reduplication (occurs in Pangasinan)
- Rightward trisyllabic reduplication (occurs in the Manam language)
- Double reduplication (occurs in Woleaian)
- Triplication (only in the Thao language)
- Serial reduplication (only in the Thao language)

== Vocabulary ==
=== Pronouns ===
The Proto-Austronesian and Proto-Malayo-Polynesian personal pronouns below were reconstructed by Robert Blust.

Proto-Austronesian and Proto-Malayo-Polynesian Pronouns
Type of Pronoun	English	Proto-Austronesian	Proto-Malayo-Polynesian
1s.	"I"	*i-aku	*i-aku
2s.	"you/thou"	*i-(ka)Su	*i-kahu
3s.	"he/she/it"	*si-ia	*si-ia
1p. (inclusive)	"we (and you)"	*i-(k)ita	*i-(k)ita
1p. (exclusive)	"we (but not you)"	*i-(k)ami	*i-(k)ami
2p.	"you all"	*i-kamu	*i-kamu, ihu
3p.	"they"	*si-ida	*si-ida

In 2006, Malcolm Ross also proposed seven different pronominal categories for persons. The categories are listed below, with the Proto-Austronesian first person singular ("I") given as examples.

1. Neutral (e.g., PAN *i-aku)
2. Nominative 1 (e.g., PAN *aku)
3. Nominative 2 (e.g., PAN *=ku, *[S]aku)
4. Accusative (e.g., PAN *i-ak-ən)
5. Genitive 1 (e.g., PAN *=[a]ku)
6. Genitive 2 (e.g., PAN *(=)m-aku)
7. Genitive 3 (e.g., PAN *n-aku)

The following is from Ross' 2002 proposal of the Proto-Austronesian pronominal system, which contains five categories, including the free (i.e., independent or unattached), free polite, and three genitive categories.

Proto-Austronesian Personal Pronouns
	Free	Free polite	Genitive 1	Genitive 2	Genitive 3
1s.	*[i-]aku	–	*=ku	*maku	*n-aku
2s.	*[i-]Su	*[i-]ka-Su	*=Su	*miSu	*ni-Su
3s.	*s(i)-ia	–	(*=ia)	–	*n(i)-ia
1p. (excl.)	*i-ami	*[i-]k-ami	*=mi	*mami	*n(i)-ami
1p. (incl.)	*([i])ita	*[i-]k-ita	*=ta	*mita	*n-ita
2p.	*i-amu	*[i-]k-amu	*=mu	*mamu	*n(i)-amu
3p.	*si-da	–	(*=da)	–	*ni-da

=== Nouns ===
Proto-Austronesian vocabulary relating to agriculture and other technological innovations include:

- *pajay: rice plant
- *beRas: husked rice
- *Semay: cooked rice
- *qayam: bird (means "domesticated animal" in PMP)
- *manuk: chicken (PMP *manu-manuk means "bird")
- *babuy: pig
- *qaNuaŋ: carabao
- *kuden: clay cooking pot
- *SadiRi: housepost
- *busuR: bow
- *panaq: flight of an arrow
- *bubu: fish trap
- *tulaNi: bamboo nose flute

Proto-Malayo-Polynesian innovations include:

- *puqun: base of a tree; origin, cause
- *sumpit: blowpipe
- *haRezan: notched log ladder (used to enter pile dwellings)
- *taytay: bamboo suspension bridge (POc *tete "ladder, bridge")
- *kaka: elder same sex sibling
- *huaji: younger same sex sibling
- *ñaRa: brother of a woman
- *betaw: sister of a man

Proto-Malayo-Polynesian also has several words for house:

- *balay (house, building for public use)
- *Rumaq (house, family dwelling)
- *banua (land, village, house, country, sky, heaven) – hence vanua and whenua (as in tangata whenua)
- *lepaw (granary)
- *kamaliR (bachelors' clubhouse)

Body parts
Body part	Proto-Austronesian	Proto-Malayo-Polynesian	Proto-Oceanic	Proto-Polynesian
hand	*(qa)lima	*(qa)lima	*lima	*lima
leg, foot	*qaqay	*qaqay	*waqe	*waqe
head	*qulu	*qulu	*qulu, *bwatu(k)	*qulu
eye	*maCa	*mata	*mata	*mata
ear	*Caliŋa	*taliŋa	*taliŋa	*taliŋa
nose	*mujiŋ	*ijuŋ	*isuŋ	*isu
mouth	*ŋusu	*baqbaq	*papaq	*ŋutu
blood	*daRaq	*daRaq	*draRaq	*toto
liver	*qaCay	*qatay	*qate	*qate
bone	*CuqelaN	*tuqelaŋ	*suri	*hui
skin	*qaNiC	*kulit	*kulit	*kili
back	*likud	*likud	*muri, *takuRu	*tuqa
belly	*tiaN	*tian, *kempuŋ	*tian	*manawa
intestines	*Cinaqi	*tinaqi	*tinaqi	
breast	*susu	*susu	*susu	*susu, *huhu
shoulder	*qabaRa	*qabaRa	*(qa)paRa	*uma
neck	*liqeR	*liqeR	*Ruqa, *liqoR	*ua
hair	*bukeS	*buhek	*raun ni qulu	*lau-qulu
tooth	*nipen	*ipen, *nipen	*nipon, *lipon	*nifo

Kinship terms
Kinship	Proto-Austronesian	Proto-Malayo-Polynesian	Proto-Oceanic	Proto-Polynesian
person, human being	*Cau	*tau	*taumataq	*taŋata
mother	*t-ina	*t-ina	*tina	*tinana
father	*t-ama	*t-ama	*tama	*tamana
child	*aNak	*anak	*natu	*tama
man, male	*ma-Ruqanay	*laki, *ma-Ruqanay	*mwaRuqane	*taqane
woman, female	*bahi	*bahi	*pine, *papine	*fafine
house	*Rumaq	*Rumaq, *balay, *banua	*Rumwaq	*fale

==== Animals ====
Common animals
Animal	Proto-Austronesian	Proto-Malayo-Polynesian	Proto-Oceanic	Proto-Polynesian
dog	*asu	*asu	–	*kuli
bird	*qayam	*qayam, *manuk	*manuk	*manu
snake	*SulaR	*hulaR, *nipay	*mwata	*ŋata
louse	*kuCu	*kutu	*kutu	*kutu
fish	*Sikan	*hikan	*ikan	*ika
chicken	*manuk	–	–	–

Selected animal names
No.	Common name	Scientific name	Proto-Austronesian
6845	the Formosan rock monkey	Macaca cyclopis	*luCuŋ
7228	deer sp.	Cervus sp., either the sika deer or sambar deer	*benan
7187	Formosan blind mole	Talpa insularis	*mumu
709	a dove	Ducula spp.?	*baRuj
7127	omen bird	Alcippe spp.	*SiSiN
234	termite, white ant	Isoptera	*aNay
6861	jungle leech	Haemadipsa spp.	*-matek
6862	jungle leech	Haemadipsa spp.	*qaNi-matek

==== Plants ====
Selected plant names
No.	Common name	Scientific name	Proto-Austronesian
8465	bracket fungus	Polyporus spp.	*kulaC
8795	broomcorn millet	Panicum miliaceum	*baCaR
10249	castor bean	Ricinus communis	*katawa
10710	elephant grass, miscanthus grass	Themeda gigantea	*Caŋelaj
6569	Formosan maple	Liquidambar formosana	*daRa₁
6629	loquat tree and fruit	Eriobotrya deflexa	*Ritu
7254	mulberry tree and fruit	Morus formosensis	*taNiud
4614	rattan	Calamus sp.	*quay
6568	soapberry	Sapindus mukorossi, Sapindus saponaria	*daqu₂
7166	stinging nettle	Laportea spp.	*laCeŋ
4900	sword grass	Imperata cylindrica	*Riaq
6689	sword grass	Imperata cylindrica	*Rimeja
7070	a hairy vine	Pueraria hirsuta	*baSay
484	giant crinum lily, spider lily	Crinum asiaticum	*bakuŋ₁
4039	Caesarweed, Congo jute	Urena lobata	*puluC
6560	Chinese sumac, nutgall tree	Rhus semialata	*beRuS
6587	aromatic litsea, may chang	Litsea cubeba	*maqaw
6630	Indian lettuce	Lactuca indica	*Samaq
6630	sow thistle	Sonchus oleraceus	*Samaq
6697	a plant	Aralia decaisneana	*tanaq
6818	European black nightshade	Solanum nigrum	*SameCi
7082	reed	Phragmites spp.	*qaReNu
7084	a plant	Begonia aptera	*qanus₁
7418	fireweed, burnweed	Erechtites spp.	*Sina
12731	Chinese elder	Sambucus formosana	*Nayad
8455	a plant with roots that are pounded and put in rivers to stun fish	Derris elliptica	*tuba
7191	a plant, sesame	Sesamum indicum	*Samud
12683	a small tree bearing round, green fruit	Ehretia spp.	*kaNawaS
611	a thorny vine	Smilax spp.	*baNaR
619	a thorny vine	Smilax spp.	*baNaw
4243	fragrant manjack	Cordia dichotoma	*qaNuNaŋ
7114	chinaberry tree	Melia azedarach	*baŋaS
12726	bishop wood	Bischofia javanica	*CuquR
12811	a tree	Zelkova formosana	*teRebeS
12773	a tree, the Chinese mahogany or Philippine mahogany	Shorea maxwelliana	*buleS
6682	a tree: the camphor laurel	Cinnamomum spp.	*dakeS
7233	an evergreen tree	Acacia confusa?	*tuquN
9776	bamboo	Bambusa spinosa?	*kawayan
1046	bamboo of very large diameter	Dendrocalamus sp.?	*betuŋ₁
6559	banana	Musa sapientum	*beNbeN
6693	betel nut	nut of Areca catechu	*Sawiki
1223	cane grass	Miscanthus sp.	*biRaSu
6620	cucumber	Cucumis sativus	*baRat₂
6621	cultivated taro	Colocasia esculenta	*Cali
8750	millet sp.	Setaria italica (?)	*zawa₂
811	millet sp., probably foxtail millet	Setaria italica	*beCeŋ
3089	plant sp.	Diospyros discolor	*kamaya
2054	sugarcane	Saccharum officinarum	*CebuS
7952	sugarcane	Saccharum officinarum	*tebuS
7304	the Japanese cypress	Chamaecyparis obtusa	*baŋun₁
12687	the Japanese raspberry	Rubus parvifolius, Rubus taiwanianus	*RiNuk
4722	tree with sticky fruits	Cordia spp.	*quNuNaŋ
1601	type of slender bamboo	Schizostachyum spp.	*buluq₂
1218	wild taro, elephant's ear or itching taro	Alocasia spp.	*biRaq₁

=== Colors and directions ===
Below are colors in reconstructed Proto-Austronesian, Proto-Malayo-Polynesian, Proto-Oceanic, and Proto-Polynesian. The first three have been reconstructed by Robert Blust, while the Proto-Polynesian words given below were reconstructed by Andrew Pawley. Proto-Polynesian displays many innovations not found in the other proto-languages.

Colors
Color	Proto-Austronesian	Proto-Malayo-Polynesian	Proto-Oceanic	Proto-Polynesian
white	*ma-puNi	*ma-putiq	*ma-puteq	*tea
black	*ma-CeŋeN	*ma-qitem	*ma-qetom	*quli(-quli)
red	*ma-puteq	*ma-iRaq	*meRaq	*kula
yellow	–	*ma-kunij	*aŋo	*reŋareŋa, *felo(-felo)
green	*mataq	*mataq	*karakarawa	*mata (?)

The Proto-Austronesians used two types of directions, which are the land-sea axis and the monsoon axis. The cardinal directions of north, south, east, and west developed among the Austronesian languages only after contact with the Europeans. For the land-sea axis, upstream/uphill and inland, as well as downstream/downhill and seaward, are synonym pairs. This has been proposed as evidence that Proto-Austronesians used to live on a mainland, since the sea would be visible from all angles on small islands.

- *daya: inland (also upstream/uphill)
- *lahud: seaward (also downstream/downhill)
- *SabaRat: west monsoon
- *timuR: east monsoon
- *qamiS: north wind

In Kavalan, Amis, and Tagalog, the reflexes of *timuR mean "south" or "south wind," while in the languages of the southern Philippines and Indonesia it means "east" or "east wind."

In Ilocano, dáya and láud respectively mean "east" and "west," while in Puyuma, ɖaya and ɭauɖ respectively mean "west" and "east." This is because the Ilocano homeland is the west coast of northern Luzon, while the Puyuma homeland is on the eastern coast of southern Taiwan. Among the Bontok, Kankanaey, and Ifugaw languages of northern Luzon, the reflexes of *daya mean "sky" because they already live in some of the highest elevations in the Philippines (Blust 2009:301).

Also, the Malay reflex of *lahud is laut, which means "sea", used as directions timur laut (means "northeast", timur = "east") and barat laut (means "northwest", barat = "west"). Meanwhile, *daya only performs in barat daya, which means "southwest".

=== Numerals ===
Below are reconstructed Proto-Austronesian, Proto-Malayo-Polynesian, Proto-Oceanic, and Proto-Polynesian numbers from the Austronesian Basic Vocabulary Database.

Note that *lima 'five', ultimately the root for 'hand', is not found for 'five' in some Formosan languages, such as Pazeh, Saisiat, Luilang, Favorlang and Taokas; numerals cognate with Proto-Malayo-Polynesian 6–10 are found in Amis, Basay, Bunun, Kanakanabu, Kavalan, Paiwan, Puyuma, Saaroa and Tsou. Pazeh, Favorlang, Saisiat and Taokas reflect *RaCep 'five'.

Laurent Sagart suggests that this was the PAn root, replaced by *lima in a lineage that lead to the remaining languages, rather than the reverse, because it seems to be retained in proto-Malayo-Polynesian in the forms 7, 8, 9, which appear to be disyllabic contractions of additive phrases attested from some of the western Formosan languages, especially Pazeh: Pazeh xaseb-uza 'six' (literally 'five-one'); xaseb-i-dusa 'seven' ('five-and-two'), with the bidu cognate with PMP *pitu; xaseb-a-turu 'eight' ('five-and-three'), with the baturu cognate with PMP *walu; xaseb-i-supat 'nine' ('five-and-four'), with the supa (< PAn *Sepat 'four') cognate with PMP *Siwa.

Numerals
Number	Proto-Austronesian	Proto-Malayo-Polynesian	Proto-Oceanic	Proto-Polynesian
one	*esa, *isa	*esa, *isa	*sa-kai, *ta-sa, *tai, *kai	*taha
two	*duSa	*duha	*rua	*rua
three	*telu	*telu	*tolu	*tolu
four	*Sepat	*epat	*pat, *pati, *pani	*faa
five	*RaCep > *lima	*lima	*lima	*lima

The Proto-Austronesian language had different sets of numerals for non-humans ("set A") and humans ("set B") (Blust 2009:279). Cardinal numerals for counting humans are derived from the non-human numerals through Ca-reduplication. This bipartite numeral system is found in Thao, Puyuma, Yami, Chamorro, and various other languages (however, Paiwan uses ma- and manə- to derive human numerals). In many Philippine languages such as Tagalog, the two numeral systems are merged (Blust 2009:280–281).

Basic numerals vs. human numerals
Number	Set A	Set B	Tagalog
one	*isa	*?	isa (A)
two	*duSa	*da-duSa	dalawa (B)
three	*telu	*ta-telu	tatlo (B)
four	*Sepat	*Sa-Sepat	apat (B)
five	*lima	*la-lima	lima (A)
six	*enem	*a-enem	anim (B)
seven	*pitu	*pa-pitu	pito (A)
eight	*walu	*wa-walu	walo (A)
nine	*Siwa	*Sa-Siwa	(siyam)
ten	*sa-puluq	*?	sampu

Proto-Austronesian also used *Sika- to derive ordinal numerals (Blust 2009:281).

=== Verbs ===
Below are reconstructed Proto-Austronesian, Proto-Malayo-Polynesian, Proto-Oceanic, and Proto-Polynesian verbs from the Austronesian Basic Vocabulary Database. Verbs have been reconstructed into two varieties: stative and dynamic.

Verbs
Verb	Proto-Austronesian	Proto-Malayo-Polynesian	Proto-Oceanic	Proto-Polynesian
to walk	*Nakaw	*lakaw, paNaw	*lako, pano	*fano
to swim	*Naŋuy	*naŋuy	*kakaRu	*kaukau
to know	*bajaq	*taqu	*taqu	*qiloa
to think	*nemnem	*demdem	*rodrom	*manatu
to sleep	*tuduR	*tuduR	*turuR	*mohe
to stand	*diRi	*diRi, *tuqud	*tuqur	*tuqu
to sew	*taSiq	*tahiq, *zaqit	*saqit, *turi	*tui
to die, be dead	*m-aCay	*m-atay	*mate	*mate
to choose	*piliq	*piliq	*piliq	*fili
to fly	*layap	*layap, Rebek	*Ropok	*lele

== Monosyllabic roots ==
The following are monosyllabic Proto-Austronesian roots reconstructed by John Wolff (Wolff 1999).

Forms which can be reconstructed as monosyllables with a great deal of certainty

- *baw 'up, above'
- *bay 'woman'
- *beg 'spool, wind'
- *bit 'carry in fingers'
- *buñ 'fontanelle'
- *but 'pluck out'
- *dem 'think, brood'
- *gem 'first, hold in fist'
- *ɣiq 'Imperata cylindrica'
- *kan 'eat'
  - *si-kan 'fish, what is eaten with staple'
  - *pa-kan 'feed, weft'
  - *paN-kan 'eat, feed'
- *kub
  - *kubkub 'cover over'
  - *takub 'cover over in a cupped way' (where *ta- is a fossilized prefix)
- *lid
  - *belit 'wind'
  - *bilid 'wind, twist, or fold s.t. over'
  - *pulid 'turn round'
- *luk 'concave bend'
- *lum 'ripe'
- *nem 'six'
- *ñam 'taste'
- *ñeŋ 'look, stare'
- *ŋa 'agape (mouth)'
  - *kaŋa 'be open (as mouth)'
  - *baŋa 'gap, stand open'
  - *binaŋa (< -in- + baŋa) / *minaŋa 'mouth of river'
  - *beŋa 'be agape'
  - *búŋa 'flower'
  - *paŋa 'forking'
  - *ʃaŋa 'branch'
- *pan 'bait'
- *pat 'four'
- *peʃ 'squeeze, deflate'
- *pit
  - *kepit 'pinched together'
- *pu 'grandparent/child'
- *put 'blow'
- *ʃaw 'wash, rinse off, dunk'
- *ʃay 'who?'
- *ʃek 'stuff, fill chock full'
- *ʃeŋ 'stop up'
- *ʃep 'suck'
- *ʃuk 'go in, through'
- *taw 'man'
- *tay 'bridge'
  - *matay 'die'
  - *patay 'dead, kill'
- *tuk 'strike, peck, beak'

Sequences which are likely (or may have been) monosyllabic roots, but cannot be unequivocally reconstructed

- *baŋ 'fly'
- *bu 'fish trap'
- *buʃ 'puff, blow out' (not well attested; most monosyllables occur in Oceanic languages)
- *dañ 'old (of things)'
- *daŋ 'heat near a fire'
- *dem 'dark, cloudy'
  - *padem 'extinguish'
- *diʃ 'cut, lance'
- *ka 'elder sibling'
- *kid 'file, rasp'
- *lag 'spread out'
  - *belag 'spread out'
  - *pálag 'palm of hand'
  - *qelag 'wing'
- *laŋ 'placed lengthwise'
  - *galaŋ 'wedge, s.t. placed underneath to support'
  - *halaŋ 'lie athwart, bar, be an obstacle'
- *leb 'for water to come over s.t.'
- *lem – reflexes variously mean 'night' or 'darkness'
- *luñ
  - *luluñ 'roll up'
  - *baluñ 'fold over, wrap'
- *muɣuɣ 'gargle, rinse out mouth' (monosyllabic status is weak)
- *pak 'make a sound of 'pak', wings (from the sound)'
- *tan 'set trap'
- *taʃ 'top'
- *tuk 'top, summit'
- *tun 'lead on a rope'

Reconstructed doubled monosyllables phonologically but which cannot be proven to be monosyllabic roots

- *baba 'carry on back'
- *bakbak 'remove outer layer of skin, bark'
- *baqbaq 'mouth'
- *bañbañ 'kind of reed used for mats, Donax canniformis'
- *bekbek 'pulverize'
- *biɣbiɣ 'lips (lip-like growth)'
- *biŋbiŋ 'hold, guide'
- *biʃbiʃ 'sprinkle'
- *buɣ(buɣ) 'broken into small pieces'
- *buñbuñ 'down, body hair' (only in Taiwan and the Philippines; probably not PAn)
- *dabdab 'set fire to'
- *dakdak 'slam s.t. down' (only in the Philippines)
- *dasdas 'chest'
- *debdeb 'chest'
- *diŋdiŋ 'wall'
- *diqdiq 'boil'
- *gapgap 'feel, grope'
- *ɣaʃɣaʃ 'scratched'
- *idid 'move rapidly in small motions' (e.g., 'fan')
- *jutjut 'pull at'
- *kaŋkaŋ 'spread the legs' (only in the Philippines and western Indonesia)
  - *bakaŋ 'bow-legged'
  - *kaqkaq 'split, torn, with intestines'
  - *keŋkeŋ 'rigid, tight'
- *kepkep 'clasp'
  - *dakep 'catch'
  - *ʃikep 'catch s.t. moving, tight'
- *kiskis 'scrape off'
- *kiʃkiʃ 'grate, file'
- *kudkud 'grate, rasp, scratch out'
- *kañuskus 'fingernail'
- *kuʃkuʃ 'rub, scrape'
- *laplap 'flapping, loose (like skin on newborn)' (only in Paiwan and Philippine languages)
- *mekmek 'fragments'
- *neknek 'gnat, fruit fly'
- *nemnem 'think'
- *palaqpaq 'frond'
- *pejpej 'press together'
- *ququ 'crab'
- *sapsap 'grope'
- *ʃaʃa 'collect palm leaves for thatching'
- *ʃakʃak 'beat, chop'
- *ʃelʃel 'regret'
- *ʃelʃel 'insert, cram in'
- *ʃiʃi 'kind of mollusk'
- *ʃikʃik 'search through thoroughly (as for lice)'
- *ʃuʃu 'breast, teat'
- *ʃuɣʃuɣ 'follow behind'
- *ʃuŋʃuŋ 'go against' (only in the Philippines and western Indonesia)
- *taktak 'fall, drop'
- *tamtam 'smack lips' or taste'
- *taʃtaʃ 'rent, break thread'
  - *bútaʃ 'hole'
  - *ɣetaʃ 'break through, break open'
  - *teʃteʃ 'rip open'
- *tutu 'strike'
- *waqwaq 'channel'
- *witwit 'swinging to and fro'

Sequences which occur as final syllables over a wide area but which cannot be reconstructed as a monosyllabic root

- *buk
  - *dabuk 'ashes'
  - *dábuk 'beat to pulp'
  - *ɣabuk 'pulverized'
  - *qabuk 'dust'
- *bun 'dew mist'
  - *bun 'heap, stack'
  - *subun 'heap, pile'
  - *timbun / *tábun (?) 'heap'
  - *ɣábun 'fog'
- *buq 'add, increase'
  - *tubuq 'grow, shoot'
- *duŋ 'protect, shelter'
- *ket
  - *deket 'near'
  - *jeket 'stick'
  - *ñiket / ñaŋket 'sticky'
  - *ñiket 'sticky substance'
  - *siket 'tie'
- *kuŋ
  - *bekuŋ 'arch'
  - *dekuŋ 'bent'
  - *leŋkuŋ 'bent'
- *kup
  - *aŋkup 'put in cupped hands'
  - *tukup 'cover'
- *kut
  - *dakut 'take in hand'
  - *ɣakut 'tie together'
  - *ʃaŋkut 'caught on a hook'
- *laq
  - *telaq / *kelaq 'crack' or 'split'
  - *belaq 'cleft'
- *liŋ
  - *baliŋ 'wind around, turn s.t. around'
  - *biliŋ 'turning round'
  - *giliŋ 'roll over s.t.'
  - *guliŋ 'roll up'
  - *paliŋ 'wind around' or 'turn body'
- *liw
  - *baliw 'return, go back'
  - *ʃaliw 'give in exchange'
- *luʃ 'slip' or 'slippery' or 'smooth'
- *naw
  - *línaw 'calm, unroiled'
  - *tiqenaw 'clear'
- *ŋaw
  - *baŋaw 'bedbug'
  - *láŋaw 'fly'
  - *tuŋaw 'kind of mite causing itch'
- *ŋet
  - *qaŋet 'warm'
  - *ʃeŋet 'sharp, stinger'
  - *ʃeŋet 'acrid in smell'
- *paɣ 'be flat'
  - *dampaɣ / *lampaɣ / *dapaɣ / *lapaɣ 'be flat'
  - *sampaɣ 'mat, spread out'
- *puŋ 'cluster, bunch'
- *taɣ
  - *dataɣ 'flat area'

== See also ==
- Austronesian personal pronouns
- Austronesian alignment
- Fossilized affixes in Austronesian languages
- Proto-Malayo-Polynesian language
- Proto-Philippine language
- Proto-Oceanic language
- Proto-Polynesian language
- Proto-Austroasiatic language
- Proto-Hmong–Mien language
- Proto-Tibeto-Burman language

== Sources ==
- Adelaar, Alexander (2005). "The Austronesian languages of Asia and Madagascar: A historical perspective". In Adelaar, Alexander; Himmelmann, Nikolaus P. (eds.). The Austronesian Languages of Asia and Madagascar. New York: Routledge. ISBN 978-0-7007-1286-1.
- Bouchard-Côté, Alexandre; Hall, David; Griffiths, Thomas L.; Klein, Dan (11 February 2013). "Automated reconstruction of ancient languages using probabilistic models of sound change". Proc. Natl. Acad. Sci. U.S.A. 110 (11): 4224–4229. doi:10.1073/pnas.1204678110. PMC 3600485.
- Blust, Robert (1999). Zeitoun, Elizabeth; Li, Paul Jen-kuei (eds.). "Subgrouping, circularity and extinction: Some issues in Austronesian comparative linguistics". Selected Papers From the 8th International Conference on Austronesian Linguistics. Taipei: Academica Sinica. Archived from the original on 9 April 2017.
- Blust, Robert A. (2013). The Austronesian Languages (Revised ed.). Canberra: Asia-Pacific Linguistics. ISBN 978-0-85883-602-0.
- Blust, Robert; Trussel, Stephen; Smith, Alexander D. (2023). "The Austronesian Comparative Dictionary Online".
- Cohen, E. M. K. (1999). Fundaments of Austronesian Roots and Etymology. Canberra: Pacific Linguistics.
- Greenhill, Simon J.; Blust, Robert A.; Gray, Russell D. (3 November 2008). "The Austronesian Basic Vocabulary Database: from bioinformatics to lexomics". Evol. Bioinform. 4: 271–283. doi:10.4137/ebo.s893. PMC 2614200.
- Shibata, Kye (January 2025). A reconstruction of Proto-Austronesian coronal consonants: Phonetic evidence from Formosan languages (PhD thesis). Hsinchu: National Tsing Hua University.
- Wolff, John U. (2010). Proto-Austronesian Phonology with Glossary. Ithaca: Cornell Southeast Asia Program Publications.
