= Hawaiian Braille =

Braille alphabet of the Hawaiian language

- Script type: alphabet
- Print basis: Hawaiian alphabet
- Languages: Hawaiian

Related scripts
- Parent systems: Braille: English Braille; Hawaiian Braille

Hawaiian Braille is the braille alphabet of the Hawaiian language. It is a subset of the basic braille alphabet.

⠁ (braille pattern dots-1)	⠑ (braille pattern dots-15)	⠓ (braille pattern dots-125)	⠊ (braille pattern dots-24)	⠅ (braille pattern dots-13)	⠇ (braille pattern dots-123)	⠍ (braille pattern dots-134)	⠝ (braille pattern dots-1345)	⠕ (braille pattern dots-135)	⠏ (braille pattern dots-1234)	⠥ (braille pattern dots-136)	⠺ (braille pattern dots-2456)
a	e	h	i	k	l	m	n	o	p	u	w

supplemented by an additional letter ⠸ to mark long vowels:

⠸ (braille pattern dots-456) ⠁ (braille pattern dots-1)	⠸ (braille pattern dots-456) ⠑ (braille pattern dots-15)	⠸ (braille pattern dots-456) ⠊ (braille pattern dots-24)	⠸ (braille pattern dots-456) ⠕ (braille pattern dots-135)	⠸ (braille pattern dots-456) ⠥ (braille pattern dots-136)
ā	ē	ī	ō	ū

(Māori Braille uses the same convention for long vowels.)

Unlike print Hawaiian, which has a special letter ʻokina for the glottal stop, Hawaiian Braille uses the apostrophe ⠄, which behaves as punctuation rather than as a consonant:

⠄⠸⠁⠊⠝⠁ ʻāina
⠄⠠⠸⠁⠊⠝⠁ ʻĀina

That is, the order to write ʻĀ is apostrophe, cap sign, length sign, A.

Punctuation is as in English Braille.
