= Personal pronouns in Austronesian languages =

This article describes the personal pronoun systems of various Austronesian languages.

== Proto-languages ==
The Proto-Austronesian and Proto-Malayo-Polynesian personal pronouns below were reconstructed by Robert Blust.

Proto-Austronesian and Proto-Malayo-Polynesian Pronouns
Type of Pronoun	English	Proto-Austronesian	Proto-Malayo-Polynesian
1s.	"I"	*i-aku	*i-aku
2s.	"you"	*i-(ka)Su	*i-kahu
3s.	"he/she/it"	*si-ia	*si-ia
1p. (inclusive)	"we (and you)"	*i-(k)ita	*i-(k)ita
1p. (exclusive)	"we (but not you)"	*i-(k)ami	*i-(k)ami
2p.	"you all"	*i-kamu	*i-kamu, ihu
3p.	"they"	*si-ida	*si-ida

In 2006, Malcolm Ross also proposed seven different pronominal categories for persons. The categories are listed below, with the Proto-Austronesian first person singular ("I") given as examples.

1. Neutral (e.g., PAN *i-aku)
2. Nominative 1 (e.g., PAN *aku)
3. Nominative 2 (e.g., PAN *=ku, *[S]aku)
4. Accusative (e.g., PAN *i-ak-ən)
5. Genitive 1 (e.g., PAN *=[a]ku)
6. Genitive 2 (e.g., PAN *(=)m-aku)
7. Genitive 3 (e.g., PAN *n-aku)

The following is from Ross' 2002 proposal of the Proto-Austronesian pronominal system, which contains five categories, including the free (i.e., independent or unattached), free polite, and three genitive categories.

Proto-Austronesian Personal Pronouns
	Free	Free polite	Genitive 1	Genitive 2	Genitive 3
1s.	*[i-]aku	-	*=ku	*maku	*n-aku
2s.	*[i-]Su	*[i-]ka-Su	*=Su	*miSu	*ni-Su
3s.	*s(i)-ia	-	(*=ia)	-	*n(i)-ia
1p. (excl.)	*i-ami	*[i-]k-ami	*=mi	*mami	*n(i)-ami
1p. (incl.)	*([i])ita	*[i-]k-ita	*=ta	*mita	*n-ita
2p.	*i-amu	*[i-]k-amu	*=mu	*mamu	*n(i)-amu
3p.	*si-da	-	(*=da)	-	*ni-da

== Formosan languages ==
=== Rukai ===
Below are Rukai pronouns from Zeitoun (1997). Paul Jen-kuei Li's classification of Rukai dialects is given for reference.

- Rukai
  - Mantauran (萬山 Wanshan) – 250-300 speakers
  - (Main branch)
    - Maga-Tona
      - Maga (馬加 Majia)
      - Tona (多納 Duona)
    - Budai-Tanan (Rukai Proper)
      - Budai (霧台 Wutai)
      - Tanan (大南 Danan)

Mantauran Rukai Personal Pronouns
Type of Pronoun	Topic	Nominative	Oblique	Genitive
1s.	iɭaə	-ɭao, nao-	-i-a-ə	-li
2s.	imiaʔə	-moʔo	i-miaʔ-ə	-ʔo
3s. (vis.)	ana	-	-i-n-ə	-(n)i
3s. (not vis.)	ðona	-	-i-ð-ə	-ða
1p. (incl.)	imitə, ita	-mita, -ta	-i-mit-ə	-ta
1p. (excl.)	inamə	-nai	-i-nam-ə	-nai
2p.	inomə	-nomi	-i-nom-ə	-nomi
3p. (vis.)	ana-lo	-	-i-l-i-n-ə	-l-i-ni
3p. (not vis.)	ðona-lo	-	-i-l-i-ð-ə	-l-i-ða

Budai Rukai Personal Pronouns
Type of Pronoun	Topic	Nominative	Oblique	Genitive
1s.	kunaku	-(n)aku, naw-	nakuanə	-li
2s.	kusu	-su	musuanə	-su
3s. (vis.)	kuini	-	inianə	-ini
3s. (not vis.)	kuiɖa	-	-	-
1p. (incl.)	kuta	-ta	mitaanə	-ta
1p. (excl.)	kunai	-nai	naianə	-nai
2p.	kunumi	-numi, -nu	numianə	-numi
3p. (vis.)	kuini	-	inianə	-ini
3p. (not vis.)	kuiɖa	-	-	-

Maga Rukai Personal Pronouns
Type of Pronoun	Topic	Nominative	Oblique	Genitive
1s.	i kɨkɨ	ku-, kɨkɨ	ŋkua	-li
2s.	i musu	su-, musu	sua	-su
3s. (vis.)	i kini	kini	nia	-ini
3s. (not vis.)	i kiɖi	kiɖi	ɖia	-ɖa
1p. (incl.)	i miti	ta-, miti	mitia	-ta
1p. (excl.)	i knamɨ	namɨ-, knamɨ	nmaa	-namɨ
2p.	i mumu	mu-, mumu	mua	-mu
3p. (vis.)	i kini	kini	nia	-ini
3p. (not vis.)	i kiɖi	kiɖi	ɖia	-ɖa

=== Tsouic ===
The personal pronouns below are from the Tfuya dialect of Tsou, and are sourced from Zeitoun (2005:277). Note that third-person pronouns are distinguished between those that are visible (abbreviated vis. below) or non-visible.

Tfuya Tsou Personal Pronouns
Type of Pronoun	Free (neutral)	Bound (nominative)	Bound (genitive)
1s.	a'o	-'o/-'u	-'o/-'u
2s.	suu	-su/-ko	-su/-ko
3s. (vis.)	taini	-ta	-taini
3s. (not vis.)	ic'o	-	-si
1p. (incl.)	a'ati	-to	-to
1p. (excl.)	a'ami	-mza	-mza
2p.	muu	-mu	-mu
3p. (vis.)	hin'i	-hin'i	-hin'i
3p. (not vis.)	hee	-	-he

=== Northwestern Formosan ===
==== Pazeh ====
The Pazeh personal pronouns below are from Li (2000). (Note: vis. = visible, prox. = proximal)

Pazeh Personal Pronouns
Type of Pronoun	Neutral	Nominative	Genitive	Locative
1s.	yaku	aku	naki	yakuan, yakunan
2s.	isiw	siw	nisiw	isiwan
2s. (prox.)	imini	mini	nimini	iminiyan
3s. (vis.)	imisiw	misiw	nimisiw	misiwan
3s. (not vis.)	isia	sia	nisia	isiaan
1p. (incl.)	ita	ta	nita (ta-)	itaan
1p. (excl.)	yami	ami	nyam(i)	yamian, yaminan
2p.	imu	mu	nimu	imuan
2p. (prox.)	yamini	amini	naamini	yaminiyan
3p. (vis.)	yamisiw	amisiw	naamisiw	yamisiwan
3p. (not vis.)	yasia	asia	naasia	yasiaan

==== Saisiyat ====
Saisiyat has an elaborate pronominal system (Hsieh & Huang 2006:93).

Saisiyat Pronouns
Type of Pronoun	Nominative	Accusative	Genitive	Dative	Possessive	Locative
1s.	yako, yao	yakin, iyakin	ma'an	'iniman	'amana'a	kanman
2s.	So'o	'iso'on	niSo	'iniSo	'anso'o'a	kanSo
3s.	sia	hisia	nisia	inisia	'ansiaa	kansia
1p. (incl.)	'ita	'inimita	mita'	'inimita'	'anmita'a	kan'ita
1p. (excl.)	yami	'iniya'om	niya'om	'iniya'om	'anya'oma	kanyami
2p.	moyo	'inimon	nimon	'inimon	'anmoyoa	kanmoyo
3p.	lasia	hilasia	nasia	'inilasia	'anlasiaa	kanlasia

==== Thao ====
The Thao personal pronouns below are from Blust (2003:207). Note that there is only 1 form each for "we (exclusive)," "you (plural)" and "they."

Thao Personal Pronouns
Type of Pronoun	Nominative	Accusative	Genitive
1s.	yaku	yakin	nak
2s.	ihu	ihu-n	m-ihu
3s.	cicu	cicu-n	cicu
1p. (incl.)	ita	ita-n	m-ita
1p. (excl.)	yamin	yamin	yamin
2p.	maniun	maniun	maniun
3p.	caycuy	caycuy	caycuy

==== Favorlang ====
The following Favorlang personal pronouns are from Li (2003:8). All of them are free forms. All genitive pronouns end with -a.

Favorlang Personal Pronouns
Type of Pronoun	Neutral	Genitive	Nominative/Accusative
1s.	ka-ina	na-a	ina
2s.	ijonoë	joa, oa	ijo
3s.	icho	choa	icho
1p. (incl.)	torro	torroa	-
1p. (excl.)	namono	namoa	namo
2p.	imonoë	imoa	imo
3p.	aicho-es dechonoë	choa	decho

=== Atayalic ===
The Wulai and Mayrinax Atayal personal pronouns below are sourced from Huang (1995). In both varieties, the nominative and genitive forms are bound while the neutral and locative ones are free (unbound).

==== Wulai Atayal ====
Wulai Atayal Personal Pronouns
Type of Pronoun	Nominative	Genitive	Locative	Neutral
1s.	sakuʔ, kuʔ	makuʔ, mu, kuʔ	knan	kuzing, kun
2s.	suʔ	suʔ	sunan	isuʔ
3s.	-	nyaʔ	hiyan	hiyaʔ
1p. (incl.)	taʔ	taʔ	itan	itaʔ
1p. (excl.)	sami	myan	sminan	sami
2p.	simu	mamu	smunan	simu
3p.	-	nhaʔ	hgan	hgaʔ

==== Mayrinax Atayal ====
Mayrinax Atayal Personal Pronouns
Type of Pronoun	Nominative	Genitive	Neutral
1s.	cu, ciʔ	mu, miʔ	kuing
2s.	suʔ, siʔ	suʔ	isuʔ
3s.	-	niaʔ	hiyaʔ
1p. (incl.)	taʔ, tiʔ	taʔ, tiʔ	itaʔ
1p. (excl.)	cami	niam	cami
2p.	cimu	mamu	cimu
3p.	-	nhaʔ	nhaʔ

==== Teruku Seediq ====
Teruku Seediq Personal Pronouns
Type of Pronoun	Direct	Oblique	Independent possessive	Subject	Genitive
1s.	yaku	kenan	(ne-)naku	=ku	=mu
2s.	isu	sunan	(ne-)nisu	=su	=su
3s.	hiya	hiyaan	ne-hiya	-	=na
1p. (incl.)	'ita	tenan	(ne-)nita	=ta	=ta
1p. (excl.)	yami	menani	(ne-)nami	=nami	=nami
2p.	yamu	munan	(ne-)namu	=namu	=namu
3p.	dehiya	dehiyaan	ne-dehiya	-	=deha

=== East Formosan ===
==== Siraya ====
The Siraya personal pronouns below are from Adelaar (1997).

Siraya Personal Pronouns
Type of Pronoun	Free	Actor or Possessive	Topic	Oblique
1s.	ĭau	-(m)au	-koh	ĭau-an
2s.	ĭmhu	-(m)uhu, -(m)oho	-kow	ĭmhu-an
3s.	teni	tĭn	teni	tĭni-än (tĭni-an)
1p. (incl.)	ĭmĭtta	-(m)ĭtta, -(m)eta	-kĭtta	ĭmittä-n
1p. (excl.)	ĭmi-an	-(m)ian, -(m)iän	-kame	mian-än (mian-an)
2p.	ĭmumi	-(m)umi	(-)kamu	ĭmumi-än (ĭmumi-an)
3p.	ta neini	nein	neini	neini-än (neini-an)

==== Taivoan ====
The Taivoan personal pronouns:

Taivoan Personal Pronouns
Type of Pronoun	Independent	Nominative	Genitive	Oblique
1s.	iau	kuri	ku	iyaw-an
2s.	imho	ko	(m)ho	imho-an
3s.	teni	ta teni	tin	tini-an
1p. (incl.)	imita	kita	(m)ita	imita-n
1p. (excl.)	imian	kame	(m)ian	imian-an
2p.	imomi	kamo	(m)omi	imomi-an
3p.	naini	ta naini	nin	naini-an

==== Kavalan ====
The Kavalan personal pronouns below are from Li (2006:30).

Kavalan Personal Pronouns
Type of Pronoun	Nominative	Genitive	Oblique	Locative
1s.	aiku, =iku	zaku, -ku	timaiku	tamaikuan
2s.	aisu, =isu	zasu, -su	timaisu	tamaisuan
3s.	aizipna tiyau	zana, -na	timaizipna tiyau	tamaizipan tiyauan
1p. (incl.)	aita, =ita	zata, -ta, -kita	timaita	tamaitan
1p. (excl.)	aimi, =imi	zanyaq, -nyaq	timaimi	tamaimian
2p.	aimu, =imu	zanumi, -numi	timaimu	tamaimuan
3p.	qaniyau	zana, -na	qaniyau	taqaniyauan

==== Basay ====
The Basay personal pronouns below are from Li (1999:639).

Basay Personal Pronouns
Type of Pronoun	Neutral	Nominative	Genitive	Oblique
1s.	yaku	kaku, -ku	maku-, -aku; naku, -ak	yakuan, kuan, kuanan
2s.	isu	kisu, -su	misu, -isu; nisu, -su ~ -is	isuan, suan, isuanan, suanan
3s.	-	-ia	-	-
1p. (incl.)	mita	kita, -ita	mita, -ita; nita, -ta	... , ... , tianan
1p. (excl.)	yami	-mi	yami, -ami; nami, -am	yamian, mian, mianan
2p.	imu	kimu, -mu	-imu; nimu, -im	imuan, ... , imuanan
3p.	-	-ia	-	-

=== Bunun ===
Takivatan Bunun personal pronoun roots are (De Busser 2009:453):

- 1s: -ak-
- 2s: -su-
- 3s: -is-
- 1p (incl.): -at-
- 1p (excl.): -ðam-
- 2p: -(a)mu-
- 3p: -in-

The tables of Takivatan Bunun personal pronouns below are sourced from De Busser (2009:441).

Takivatan Bunun Personal Pronouns
Type of Pronoun	Root	Foc. Agent (bound)	Non-Foc. Agent (bound)	Neutral	Foc. Agent	Locative	Possessive
1s.	-ak-	-(ʔ)ak	-(ʔ)uk	ðaku, nak	sak, saikin	ðakuʔan	inak, ainak, nak
2s.	-su-	-(ʔ)as	-	suʔu, su	-	suʔuʔan	isu, su
1p. (incl.)	-at-	-	-	mita	ʔata, inʔata	mitaʔan	imita
1p. (excl.)	-ðam-	-(ʔ)am	-	ðami, nam	ðamu, sam	ðamiʔan	inam, nam
2p.	-(a)mu-	-(ʔ)am	-	muʔu, mu	amu	muʔuʔan	imu, mu

Takivatan Bunun Third-Person Personal Pronouns
	Singular	Plural
[Root]	-is-	-in-
Proximal	isti	inti
Medial	istun	intun
Distal	ista	inta

Iskubun Bunun personal pronouns are somewhat different (De Busser 2009:454).

Iskubun Bunun Personal Pronouns
Type of Pronoun	Agent	Undergoer	Possessive
1s.	saikin, -ik	ðaku, -ku	inak, nak
2s.	kasu, -as	su	isu, su
3s.	saia	saiʤa	isaiʤa, saiʤa
1p. (incl.)	kata, -ta	mita	imita
1p. (excl.)	kaimin, -im	ðami	inam
2p.	kamu, -am	mu	imu
3p.	naia	inaiʤa	naiʤa

=== Paiwan ===
The Kuɬaɬau Paiwan personal pronouns below are from Ferrell (1982:14).

Paiwan Personal Pronouns
Type of Pronoun	Equational	Genitive	Non-Eq., Non-Gen.
1s.	-aken, ti-aken	ku-, ni-aken	tjanu-aken
2s.	-sun, ti-sun	su-, ni-sun	tjanu-sun
3s.	ti-madju	ni-madju	tjai-madju
1p. (incl.)	-itjen, ti-tjen	tja-, ni-tjen	tjanu-itjen
1p. (excl.)	-amen, ti-amen	nia-, ni-amen	tjanu-amen
2p.	-mun, t-mun	nu-, ni-mun	tjanu-mun
3p.	ti-a-madju	ni-a-madju	tjai-a-madju

=== Puyuma ===
The Nanwang Puyuma personal pronouns below are from Teng (2008:61-64).

Puyuma Personal Pronouns (Free)
Type of Pronoun	Nominative	Oblique: Direct	Oblique: Indirect	Oblique: Non-Subject	Neutral
1s.	nanku	kanku, kananku	draku, drananku	kanku	kuiku
2s.	nanu	kanu, kananu	dranu, drananu	kanu	yuyu
3s.	nantu	kantu, kanantu	dratu, dranantu	kantaw	taytaw
1p. (incl.)	nanta	kanta, kananta	drata, drananta	kanta	taita
1p. (excl.)	naniam	kaniam, kananiam	draniam, drananiam	kaniam	mimi
2p.	nanemu	kanemu, kananemu	dranemu, drananemu	kanemu	muimu
3p.	nantu	kantu, kanantu	dratu, dranantu	kantaw	-

Puyuma Personal Pronouns (Bound)
Type of Pronoun	Nominative (Subject)	Nominative (Possessor of subject)	Genitive
1s.	=ku	ku=	ku=
2s.	=yu	nu=	nu=
3s.	-	tu=	tu=
1p. (incl.)	=ta	ta=	ta=
1p. (excl.)	=mi	niam=	mi=
2p.	=mu	mu=	mu=
3p.	-	tu=	tu=

== Malayo-Polynesian languages ==
=== Philippine languages ===
==== Ilokano ====
Ilokano personal pronouns distinguish three cases: absolutive, ergative, and oblique. They also distinguish three numbers: singular, dual and plural.

Accent marks in the following table are not written, but given here for pronunciation purposes.

Ilokano Personal Pronouns
	Absolutive		Ergative	Oblique
	Disjunctive	Enclitic (-ak)	Enclitic (-ko)	Disjunctive
1st person singular	siák	-ak	-k(o)	kaniák
1st person dual	datá, sitá	-ta	-ta	kadatá
2nd person singular	siká	-ka	-m(o)	kenká
3rd person singular	isú(na)	-Ø	-na	kenkuána
1st person plural inclusive	datayó, sitayó	-tayó	-tayó	kadatayó
1st person plural exclusive	dakamí, sikamí	-kamí	-mi	kadakamí
2nd person plural	dakayó, sikayó	-kayó	-yo	kadakayó
3rd person plural	isúda	-da	-da	kadakuáda

==== Tagalog ====
Like nouns, Tagalog personal pronouns are categorized by case. As above, the indirect forms also function as the genitive.

Tagalog Personal Pronouns
	Direct (ang)	Indirect (ng)	Oblique (sa)
1st person singular	akó	ko	akin
1st person dual	kitá/kata	nitá/nata	kanitá/kanata (ata)
1st person plural inclusive	tayo	natin	atin
1st person plural exclusive	kamí	namin	amin
2nd person singular	ikáw (ka)	mo	iyó
2nd person plural	kayó	ninyó	inyó
3rd person singular	siyá	niyá	kaniyá
3rd person plural	silá	nilá	kanilá

==== Cebuano ====
Like nouns, Cebuano personal pronouns are categorized by case.

Cebuano Personal Pronouns
	Kinsa	Tag-iya (primary)	Tag-iya (modifier)	Oblique
1st person singular	ako	akoa	nako	kanako
2nd person singular	ikaw	imoha	nimo	kanimo
3rd person singular	siya / sya	iyaha /iya	niya	kaniya
1st person plural inclusive	kita	atoa / ato	nato	kanato
1st person plural exclusive	kami	amoa / amo	namo	kanamo
2nd person plural	kamo	inyoha	ninyo	kaninyo
3rd person plural	sila	ilaha	nila	kanila

*The two sets of tag-iya case function similarly except that the primary tag-iya would need the unifying linker nga and the modifier tag-iya cannot be used as complementary adjective.
**The final syllable of a primary tag-iya pronoun is mostly dropped.

When the pronoun is not the first word of the sentence, the short form is more commonly used than the full form.

Cebuano Enclitic Personal Pronouns
	Kinsa	Tag-iya (primary)	Tag-iya (modifier)	Oblique
1st person singular	ko	ako	ko	nako
2nd person singular	ka	imo	mo	nimo
3rd person singular	siya	iya	niya	niya
1st person plural inclusive	ta	ato	ta	nato
1st person plural exclusive	mi	amo	namo	namo
2nd person plural	mo	inyo	ninyo	ninyo
3rd person plural	sila	ila	nila	nila

*When the object is a second person pronoun, use ta instead of ko.

=== Malay ===
The informal pronouns aku, kamu, engkau, ia, kami, and kita are indigenous to Malay. However, there are more personal pronouns according to formality, see more at Malay grammar.

Malay personal pronouns
Person	Malay	English
First person	saya (standard, polite), aku (informal, familiar)	I, me
First person	kami	we, us: they and me, s/he and me
First person	kita	we, us: you and me, you and us
Second person	anda (polite, formal), engkau, kamu (familiar, informal)	you, thou, thee
Second person	anda sekalian (formal), kalian (informal)	you, y'all
Third person	ia ~ dia, dia orang	he, she, him, her
Third person	ia ~ dia, mereka, dia orang	they, them

Possessive pronouns

Aku, kamu, engkau, and ia have short possessive enclitic forms. All others retain their full forms like other nouns, as does emphatic dia: meja saya, meja kita, meja anda, meja dia "my table, our table, your table, his/her table".

Possessed forms of meja "table"
Pronoun	Enclitic	Possessed form
aku	-ku	mejaku (my table)
kamu	-mu	mejamu (your table)
engkau	-kau	mejakau (your table)
ia	-nya	mejanya (his, her, their table)

=== Javanese ===
Javanese Personal Pronouns
Person	Javanese	English
First person	aku (standard, informal), kula (formal), dalem/kawula (more formal/ humble)	I, me
First person	dhèwè/awaké dhèwè (informal), kita (formal)	we, us
Second person	kowé (informal), sampéyan (formal), panjenengan (more formal)	you
Second person	kowé kabèh (informal), sampéyan sedaya (formal), panjenengan sedanten (more formal)	you, you all
Third person	dhèwèké/wongé (informal), piyantuné, panjenengané (formal), panjenenganipun (more formal)	he, she, him, her
Third person	dhèwèké kabèh (informal, but rarely), wong-wong iku (informal) panjenenganipun sedanten, tiyang-tiyang/piyantun-piyantun puniki (more formal)	they, them

Javanese lacks some personal pronouns. For the first person plural, Javanese use awaké dhèwè, literally meaning "the body itself" (cf. Malay : badannya sendiri) or just dhèwè, that originally means "itself" or "alone". For the third person singular, Javanese uses dhèwèké that means "itself" (cf. Malay: dirinya), from dhèwè (self, alone) + -k- (archaic glottal stop)+ -(n)é (3rd person possessive enclitic), or wongé' (cf. Malay: orangnya) that means "the person", from wong (person)+ -(n)é (3rd person possessive enclitic, that is also used for demonstrative). The rest of plural pronouns uses words kabèh/sedaya/sedanten, all of them meaning "all" after the singular form.

Possessive pronouns

Aku, kowé, and dhèwèké have short possessive enclitic forms. All others retain their full forms like other nouns: griyané kula, omahé awaké dhèwè, dalemipun panjenengan "my house (formal), our house (informal), your house (more formal)".

Possessed forms of omah/ griya/ dalem "house"
Pronoun	Enclitic	Possessed form
aku	-ku/-(n)é kula/-ipun dalem	omahku/griyané kula/dalemipun dalem (my house)
kowe	-mu/-(n)é sampeyan/-ipun panjenengan	omahmu/griyané sampeyan/dalemipun panjenengan (your house)
dhèwèké	-(n)é/-ipun	omahé/griyané/dalemipun (his, her, their house)

=== Polynesian languages ===
==== Tongan ====
The Tongan cardinal pronouns are the main personal pronouns which in Tongan can either be preposed (before the verb) or postposed (after the verb). The first are the normal pronouns, the latter the stressed pronouns, which are also used as reflexive pronouns.

Tongan Personal Pronouns
		Position	Singular	Dual	Plural
1st person	exclusive (I, we, us)	preposed	u, ou, ku	ma	mau
1st person	exclusive (I, we, us)	postposed	au	kimaua	kimautolu
1st person	inclusive (one, we, us)	preposed	te	ta	tau
1st person	inclusive (one, we, us)	postposed	kita	kitaua	kitautolu
2nd person		preposed	ke	mo	mou
2nd person		postposed	koe	kimoua	kimoutolu
3rd person		preposed	ne	na	nau
3rd person		postposed	ia	kinaua	kinautolu

==== Samoan ====
Like many Austronesian languages, Samoan has separate words for inclusive and exclusive we, and distinguishes singular, dual, and plural. The root for the inclusive pronoun may occur in the singular, in which case it indicates emotional involvement on the part of the speaker.

Samoan Personal Pronouns
	singular	dual	plural
First person exclusive	a‘u, ‘ou	mā‘ua, mā	mātou
First person inclusive	tā	tā‘ua, tā	tātou
Second person	‘oe, ‘e	‘oulua	‘outou, tou
Third person	ia / na	lā‘ua	lātou

In formal speech, fuller forms of the roots mā-, tā-, and lā- are ‘imā-, ‘itā-, and ‘ilā-.

==== Hawaiian ====
Hawaiian Personal Pronouns
			Singular (1)			Dual (2)				Plural (3+)			
			1st	2nd	3rd	1st incl.	1st excl.	2nd	3rd	1st incl.	1st excl.	2nd	3rd
Case	Nominative		au	ʻoe	ia	kāua	māua	ʻolua	lāua	kākou	mākou	ʻoukou	lākou
Case	Genitive	a-class	kaʻu	kāu	kāna	kā kāua	kā māua	kā ʻolua	kā lāua	kā kākou	kā mākou	kā ʻoukou	kā lākou
Case	Genitive	o-class	koʻu	kou	kōna	kō kāua	kō māua	kō ʻolua	kō lāua	kō kākou	kō mākou	kō ʻoukou	kō lākou
Case	Genitive	affectionate	kuʻu	kō	Only used in 1st and 2nd person singular.								
Case	Accusative, Dative		iaʻu	iā ʻoe	iā ia	iā kāua	iā māua	iā ʻolua	iā lāua	iā kākou	iā mākou	iā ʻoukou	iā lākou

The a-class possessive pronouns refer to alienable possession, as with boats, children, clothing, and spouses. The o-class possessive pronouns refer to inalienable (incapable of being begun or ended) possession, as with parents and body parts.

== See also ==
- Category:Pronouns by language
- Fossilized affixes in Austronesian languages
