= Fossilized affixes in Austronesian languages =

Fossilized affixes abound in Austronesian languages.

== Formosan languages ==
Li and Tsuchida (2009) lists various fossilized reflexes of Proto-Austronesian infixes *-al-, *-aR-, and *-aN- in all major Formosan languages as well as Tagalog and Sundanese. These infixes are not productive in any modern Austronesian language. Their meanings remain elusive, although Li and Tsuchida suggest that *-aN- might mean 'having the sound or quality of', as evidenced in Paiwan and Puyuma. Reid (1994) hypothesizes the meaning of *-aR- to be 'distributive, plural'.

The following table is from Li and Tsuchida (2009:358).

Reflexes of Proto-Austronesian infixes
Language	*-al-	*-aR-	*-aN-
Thao	-ar-	–	-az-
Favorlang	-ar-	–	–
Kavalan	-ar-, -aR-	-al-, -ar-, -aR-	-an-
Basay	–	-al-, -ar-	-an-
Siraya	-ar-	–	-aL-
Amis	-al-	-al-	-alh-
Saisiyat	-aL-	-aL-	-al-
Pazih	-ar-	–	-al-
Bunun	-a-	-al-	-an-
Paiwan	-al-	-a-	-alj-
Puyuma	-aL-	-ar-	-al-
Tsou	-r-	-r-	–
Kanakanavu	-al-	-ar-	-an-
Saaroa	-al-	-ar-	-alh-
Atayal	-a-	-ag-	-al-
Rukai	-aL-	-ar-	-al-
Tagalog	-al-, -a'-	-ag-	-an-
Sundanese	–	-ar-	–

== Bikol language ==
Malcolm Mintz (1992) analyzed fossilized affixes from Marcos de Lisboa's Vocabulario de la lengua bicol, which was compiled between 1609 and 1613. The Marcos de Lisboa dictionary contains many archaic forms of Bikol no longer found in modern spoken Naga Bikol.

- a-
- aN-
- ali(N)-, li-, ari(N)-
- alu-, aru-
- ati-
- ba-, baN-, -al-
- ba- + ali(N)-, balik-
- hiN-
- mu-, pu-, -um-
- sa-, sa- + ali(N)-, saN-
- taga-, tagu-
- ta-, taN-
- so-, no-
- -imin-

== *kali/qali word forms ==
According to Blust (2001, 2009), the fossilized morpheme *kali ~ *qali is used in various Austronesian languages to designate objects having a "sensitive connection with the spirit world."
