= Lingual consonant =

A lingual consonant is a consonant articulated with the tongue. The term may be used to refer to one of the following types of consonants, or as an umbrella term encompassing all of them:

- Coronal consonants, with the front of the tongue
  - Apical consonants, with the tip (apex) of the tongue
  - Laminal consonants, with the blade of the tongue
  - Subapical consonants, with the underside of the tongue
- Dorsal consonants, with the back (dorsum) of the tongue
- Radical consonants, with the root (radix) of the tongue
