= Hawaiian alphabet =

Latin alphabet of the Hawaiian language

- Script type: Alphabet
- Creator: American Protestant missionaries
- Period: 1822–present
- Direction: Left-to-right
- Languages: Hawaiian language

Related scripts
- Parent systems: Latin: Hawaiian alphabet

The Hawaiian alphabet (in Hawaiian: ka pīʻāpā Hawaiʻi) is an alphabet used to write Hawaiian. It was adapted from the English alphabet in the early 19th century by American missionaries to print a bible in the Hawaiian language.

== Origins ==
In 1778, British explorer James Cook made the first reported European voyage to Hawaiʻi. In his report, he wrote the name of the islands as "Owhyhee" or "Owhyee". In 1822, a writing system based on one similar to the new New Zealand Grammar was developed and printed by American Protestant missionary Elisha Loomis. The original alphabet included five vowels and thirteen consonants:

A, E, I, O, U, B, D, H, K, L, M, N, P, R, T, V, W, ‘

and seven diphthongs:

AE, AI, AO, AU, EI, EU, OU

However, the letters F, G, J, S, Y, and Z were also used solely to spell foreign words.

In 1826, the developers voted to eliminate some of the letters which represented functionally redundant interchangeable letters, enabling the Hawaiian alphabet to approach the ideal state of one-symbol-one-sound, and thereby optimizing the ease with which people could teach and learn the reading and writing of Hawaiian.

- Interchangeable B/P. B was dropped, P was kept
- Interchangeable L/R/D. L was kept, R and D were dropped
- Interchangeable K/T/D. K was kept, T and D were dropped
- Interchangeable V/W. V was dropped, W was kept

=== ʻOkina ===
Due to words with different meanings being spelled alike, a separate letter to represent the glottal stop became desirable. As early as 1823, the missionaries made limited use of the apostrophe to represent the glottal stop, but they did not make it a letter of the alphabet. In publishing the Hawaiian Bible, they used the ʻokina to distinguish koʻu ('my') from kou ('your'). It was not until 1864 that the ʻokina became a recognized letter of the Hawaiian alphabet.

=== Kahakō ===
As early as 1821, one of the missionaries, Hiram Bingham, was using macrons in making handwritten transcriptions of Hawaiian vowels. The macron, or kahakō, was used to differentiate between short and long vowels.

== Modern alphabet ==
The current official Hawaiian alphabet consists of 13 letters: five vowels (A a, E e, I i, O o, and U u) and eight consonants (H h, K k, L l, M m, N n, P p, W w, and ʻ). Alphabetic order differs from the normal Latin order in that the vowels come first, then the consonants. The five vowels with macrons (kahakō)– Ā ā, Ē ē, Ī ī, Ō ō, Ū ū – are not treated as separate letters, but are alphabetized immediately after unaccented vowels. The ʻokina is ignored for purposes of alphabetization, but is included as a consonant. These are used in governmental publications, both in Hawaii and with the federal government, for example on the 2023 USA quarter dollar commemorating Edith Kanakaʻole.

=== Pronunciation ===
The letter names were invented for Hawaiian specifically, since they do not follow traditional European letter names in most cases. The names of M, N, P, and possibly L were most likely derived from Greek, and that for W from the deleted letter V.

Letter	Name	IPA
A a	ʻā	/a/
E e	ʻē	/e/
I i	ʻī	/i/
O o	ʻō	/o/
U u	ʻū	/u/
H h	hē	/h/
K k	kē	/k ~ t/
L l	lā	/l ~ ɾ ~ ɹ/
M m	mū	/m/
N n	nū	/n/
P p	pī	/p/
W w	wē	/w ~ v/
ʻ	ʻokina	/ʔ/

=== Diphthongs ===
Diphthongs
Diphthongs	Pronunciation	Examples
ai	i in ice	kai = sea water
ae	I or eye	Maeʻole = never-fading
ao	ow in how with lower offglide	Maoli = true Kaona = town
au	ou in louse or house	Au = I, I am
ei	ei in eight	Lei = garland
eu	eh-(y)oo	ʻEleu = lively
iu	ee-(y)oo similar to ew in few	Wēkiu = topmost
oe	oh-(w)eh	ʻOe = you
oi	oi in voice	Poi = a Hawaiian staple
ou	ow in bowl	Kou = your
ui	oo-(w)ee in gooey	Hui = together, team, chorus

== See also ==
- Hawaiian Braille
