= Valdemar Knudsen =

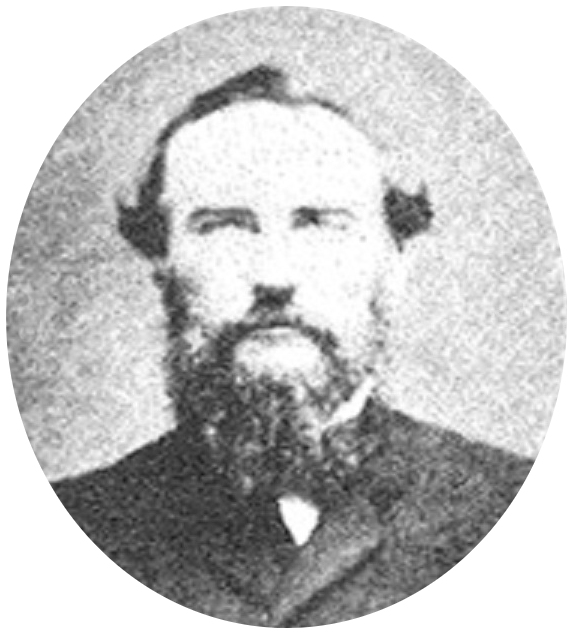
Valdemar Knudsen, c. 1875

Valdemar Emil Knudsen (August 5, 1820 – January 5, 1898) was a sugarcane plantation pioneer on west Kauai, Hawaii.

== Background ==
Valdemar Emil Knudsen was born in Kristiansand, in Vest-Agder county, Norway. He was college-trained in botany and science in Copenhagen. Knudsen was successful both as a publisher in New York City and as a merchant during the California gold rush of the 1840s. He learned the languages of the local Indians and helped them with advice in legal matters. In November 1849, he was part of the California Constitutional Convention.

== Career ==
Knudsen arrived in Kekaha, Kauai, Hawaii in 1856. He managed the Grove Farm Plantation which was then owned by Hermann A. Widemann. The Kingdom of Hawaii contracted with Knudsen for the removal of armaments from Russian Fort Elizabeth, east of the town of Waimea. In a letter sent to Honolulu, Knudsen listed an inventory of the guns at the fort following a survey made in 1862.

Knudsen subsequently bought a 30-year lease on Hawaiian crown lands in the Waimea district where he established a ranch. He worked in partnership with ship captain Henrik Christian L’Orange (1843-1916) from Halden, Norway. Using an old Hawaiian ditch at Waiele, Knudsen drained and reclaimed about 50 acres (200,000 m^{2}) on which he planted sugarcane in 1878. This cane, of the Lahaina variety, was the first commercially grown sugarcane in Kekaha. This plantation formed the basis of the Kekaha Sugar Company.

Knudsen's nephew, Hans Peter Faye, drew up much of the plantation's design. Kekaha Sugar was initially seen as a shaky investment with a need for great amounts of capital to build an infrastructure of canals, pumps, water systems and other facilities needed to overcome its inherent physical disadvantages. These pioneering years were rough ones for the growers who lacked an abundant water supply on Kauai. The plantation railroad was started in 1884. Mules pulled the cane cars until 1886, when they were replaced with German-built locomotives.

Valdemar Knudsen forwarded birds to the Smithsonian Institution as early as 1866. Knudsen's efforts put Kauai ahead of the other Hawaiian islands in terms of ornithological knowledge for a time. He first collected the Kauaʻi ʻakialoa (Akialoa (ellisiana) stejnegeri). Leonhard Stejneger first described the species from a specimen collected by Valdemar Knudsen. The Hawaiian stilt (Himantopus mexicanus knudseni) is named for him.

Knudsen was appointed by the King Kalākaua to a seat in the House of Nobles. Knudsen turned down the seat but served as an elected representative of the people in 1860. His knowledge of law and the fact that he spoke the 3 Hawaiian languages fluently suited him for office. Knudsen also served as a member of the House of Representatives under the Monarchy and joined the Provisional Government after Queen Liliuokalani was deposed in 1893.

== Personal life ==
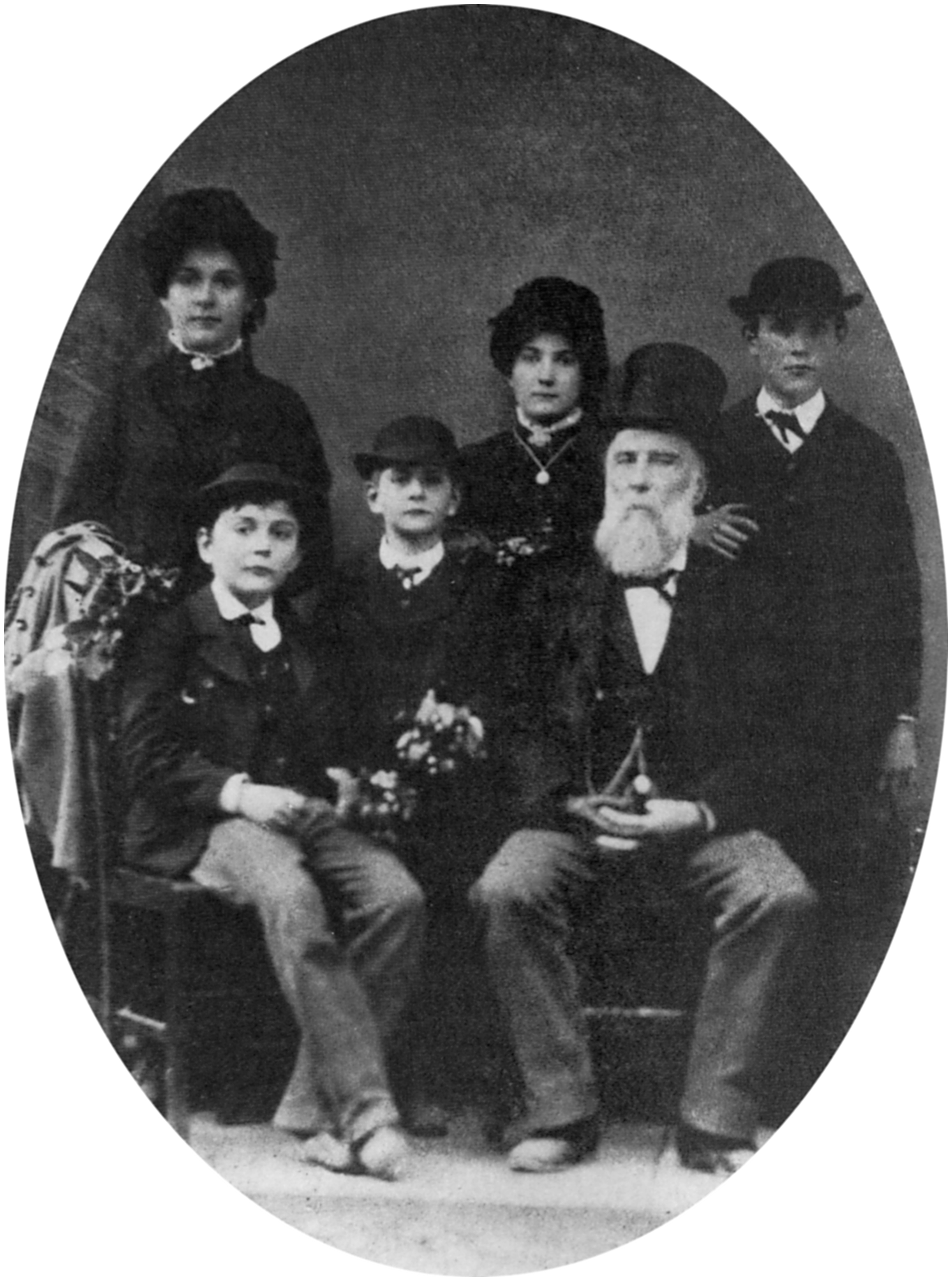
Photographed in Vienna, 1885, Valdemar Knudsen and his children. Standing left to right: Ida, Maud, and Augustus. Sitting left to right: Eric, Arthur and Valdemar

During February 1867, Knudsen married Anne McHutcheson Sinclair, with whom he had five children: Ida, Augustus, Maud, Eric and Arthur, born between 1868 and 1875. Following his death, there were claims of allegedly illegitimate children which resulted in failed attempts of taking over the Kekaha Sugar Company. Valdemar Knudsen was known to the Hawaiians as Kanuka. In 1945, his son Eric Alfred Knudsen published Kanuka of Kauai, a book on the life of his father, as well as the Hawaiian natives who befriended him.

Sinclair-Robinson family tree

Francis W. Sinclair (1797–1846)	Elizabeth McHutcheson (1800–1892)
George Sinclair (d. 1846)	Charles B. Robinson	Helen Sinclair	Jane Sinclair (d. 1916)	Thomas Gay (d. 1865)	James Sinclair (d. 1873)	Francis Sinclair (d. 1916)	Isabella McHutcheson (d. 1900)	Anne Sinclair (1839–1922)	Valdemar Knudsen (1819–1898)
Aubrey Robinson (1853–1936)	Alice Gay	Francis Gay	Eric Alfred Knudsen (1872–1957)
Aylmer Robinson (1888–1967)	Lester Beauclerk Robinson (1901–1969)	Helen Matthew (1910–2002)
Keith Robinson (b. 1941)	Bruce Robinson

== Other sources ==
- Gripsland, Torbjorn (2004) Forgotten Norwegians in Hawaii (emgirantforlaget)
- Knudsen, Eric A. and Gurre P. Noble (1945) Kanuka of Kaua‘i: The Story of a True Pioneer (Mutual Publishing)
- Mills, Peter R. (2002) Hawaii's Russian Adventure: A New Look at Old History (University of Hawaii Press) ISBN 978-0-8248-2404-4
- Moe, Jon (1975) Akamai: Sagaen om den norske utvandring til Hawaii (Gyldendal) ISBN 978-82-05-08379-0
- Satrum, Joe (2011). 1881 - Norwegians in Hawaii (PDF). Norwegian-American Seminar XI, Norwegian-American Historical Association in Norway.
- Stejneger, Leonhard Hess (1887) Birds of Kauai Island, Hawaiian Archipelago collected by Mr. Valdemar Knudsen (Washington: Smithsonian Institution)
- Wilcox, Carol (1998) Sugar Water (University of Hawaii Press) ISBN 978-0-8248-2044-2
