= Eric Alfred Knudsen =

American writer and politician (1872–1957)

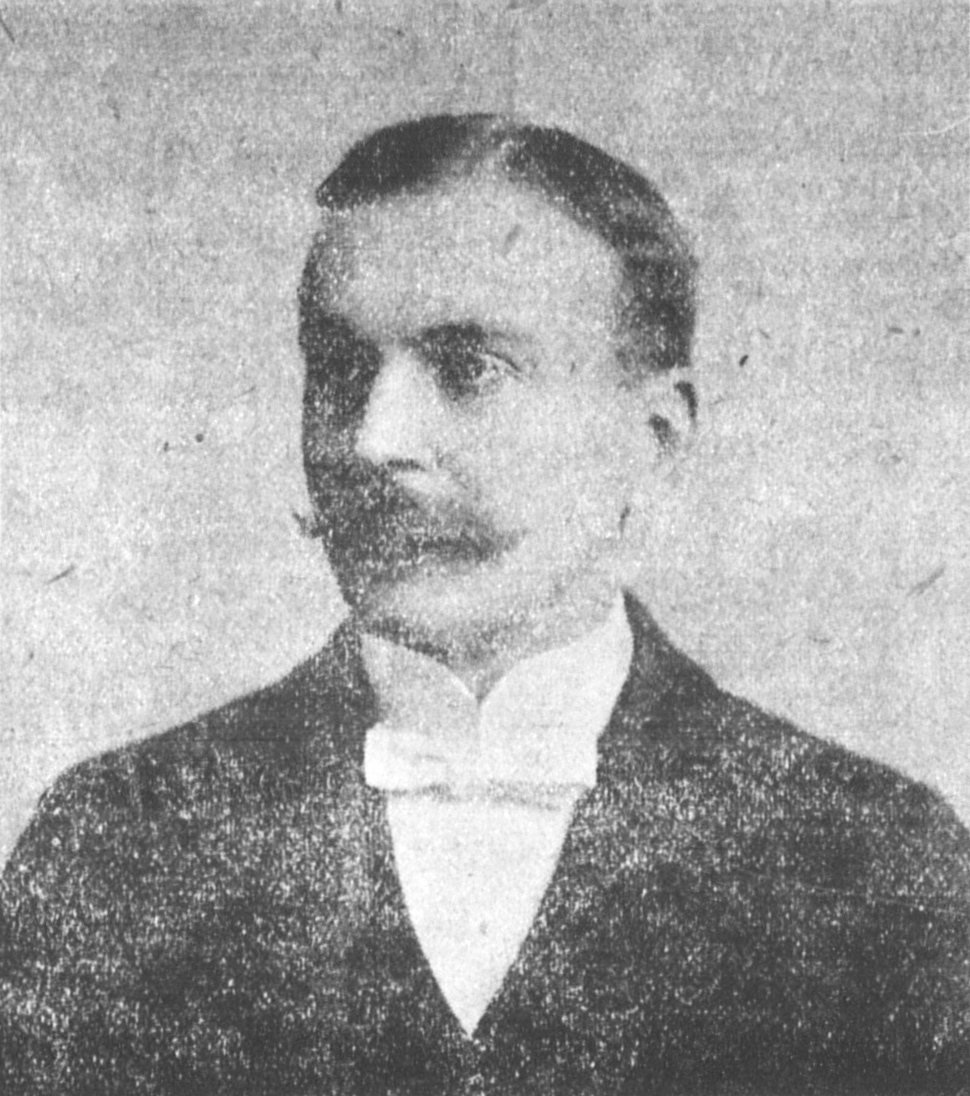
- Knudsen in 1906
- Born: July 29, 1872; Waiawa, Hawaiian Kingdom
- Died: February 12, 1957 (aged 84); Lihue, Hawaii, U.S.

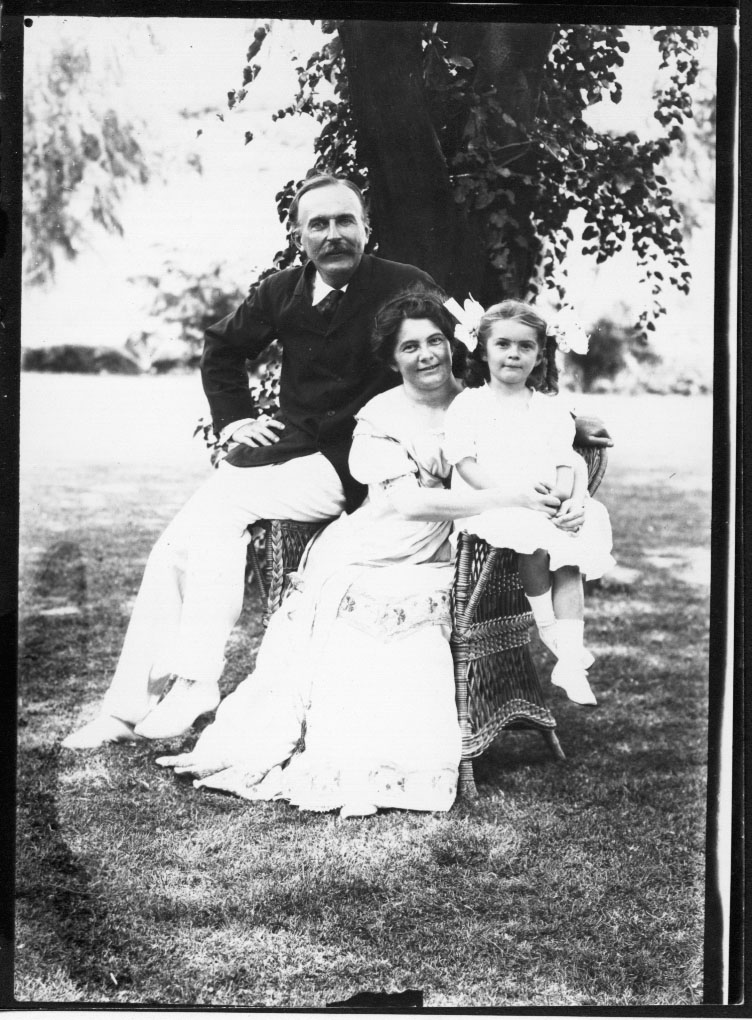
Eric Knudsen and family

Eric Alfred Knudsen (July 29, 1872 – February 12, 1957) was an American writer, folklorist, lawyer and politician who grew up and lived on Kauai, Hawaii. His father was Valdemar Knudsen, a west Kauai sugar plantation pioneer.

He married Cecilie L'Orange on September 15, 1905, in Oslo, Norway. They had five children.

Knudsen was a delegate from Kauai to the 1904 Republican National Convention. He was also a member of the Hawaii House of Representatives, and served as its Speaker from 1905 to 1907.

He is most known for his writings and collections of short stories of and about Hawaiian folklore and culture.

== Selected works ==
- Hawaiian tales told by Teller of Hawaiian Tales (1945)
- Kanuka of Kauai (1945)
- Teller of Hawaiian Tales (1946)

== Family tree ==
Sinclair-Robinson family tree

Francis W. Sinclair (1797–1846) | Elizabeth McHutcheson (1800–1892)
George Sinclair (d. 1846) | Charles B. Robinson | Helen Sinclair | Jane Sinclair (d. 1916) | Thomas Gay (d. 1865) | James Sinclair (d. 1873) | Francis Sinclair (d. 1916) | Isabella McHutcheson (d. 1900) | Anne Sinclair (1839–1922) | Valdemar Knudsen (1819–1898)
Aubrey Robinson (1853–1936) | Alice Gay | Francis Gay | Eric Alfred Knudsen (1872–1957)
Aylmer Robinson (1888–1967) | Lester Beauclerk Robinson (1901–1969) | Helen Matthew (1910–2002)
Keith Robinson (b. 1941) | Bruce Robinson
