= Aylmer Francis Robinson =

Hawaiian ranch owner (1888–1967)

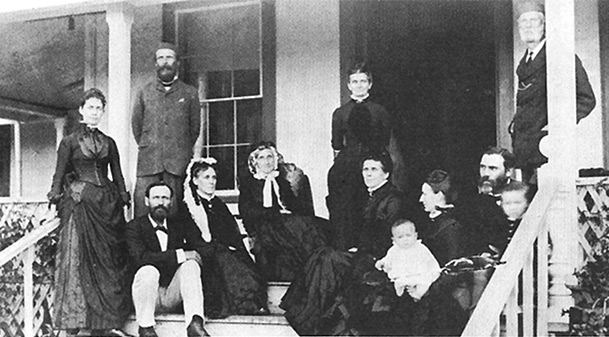
- Sinclair family at Makaweli House, 1893. The young Aylmer is on his mother's lap.
- Born: May 6, 1888; Makaweli, Kauaʻi, Hawaiian Kingdom
- Died: April 3, 1967 (aged 78)
- Occupations: Planter, Rancher
- Parent(s): Aubrey Robinson; Alice Gay

Aylmer Francis Robinson (May 6, 1888 – April 3, 1967) was an owner of the Hawaiian island of Niʻhau and a rancher.

== Life ==
Aylmer Francis Robinson was born on May 6, 1888, at the Robinson family estate in Makaweli on the island of Kauaʻi during the Kingdom of Hawaii. His father was Aubrey Robinson (1853–1936) and his mother was Alice Gay Robinson who was his father's cousin. This made him the double great-grandson of family matriarch Elizabeth McHutchison Sinclair (1800–1892). Besides various properties on Kauaʻi, the family owned the entire island of Niʻihau since 1864.

He was sent to St. Mathew's Military School in Burlingame, California, and then graduated from Harvard University in 1910. He returned and worked at a sugarcane plantation in Waipahu, Hawaii, in 1911.

He became manager of the Makaweli ranch in 1912, and then a partner in the Gay and Robinson business, formed by his father and uncle Francis Gay. In 1922 he took over from his father who retired from managing the ranch on Niʻihau. He was scheduled for one of his weekly visits when a Japanese warplane crashed on the island after the attack on Pearl Harbor in 1941. In what became known as the Niihau Incident, the pilot was captured, then freed by one of Robinson's Japanese employees. Robinson led American soldiers to the island, where the remains of both the pilot and the aircraft were recovered.

A species of palm tree, Pritchardia aylmer-robinsonii was named for him by botanist Harold St. John in 1947. Although never active himself in politics, he identified himself with the Hawaii Republican Party, and residents of the family island voted solidly Republican even after the rest of the territory and later the state of Hawaii, turned Democratic. He never married, so when he died on April 3, 1967, the family estates went to his youngest brother Lester. The Gay & Robinson sugar business shut down in 2009 after 120 years.

== Family tree ==
Sinclair-Robinson family tree

Francis W. Sinclair (1797–1846)	Elizabeth McHutcheson (1800–1892)
George Sinclair (d. 1846)	Charles B. Robinson	Helen Sinclair	Jane Sinclair (d. 1916)	Thomas Gay (d. 1865)	James Sinclair (d. 1873)	Francis Sinclair (d. 1916)	Isabella McHutcheson (d. 1900)	Anne Sinclair (1839–1922)	Valdemar Knudsen (1819–1898)
Aubrey Robinson (1853–1936)	Alice Gay	Francis Gay	Eric Alfred Knudsen (1872–1957)
Aylmer Robinson (1888–1967)	Lester Beauclerk Robinson (1901–1969)	Helen Matthew (1910–2002)
Keith Robinson (b. 1941)	Bruce Robinson

== See also ==
- Sugar plantations in Hawaii
