= Aubrey Robinson (Hawaii planter) =

Plantation and ranch owner in the Hawaiian Islands

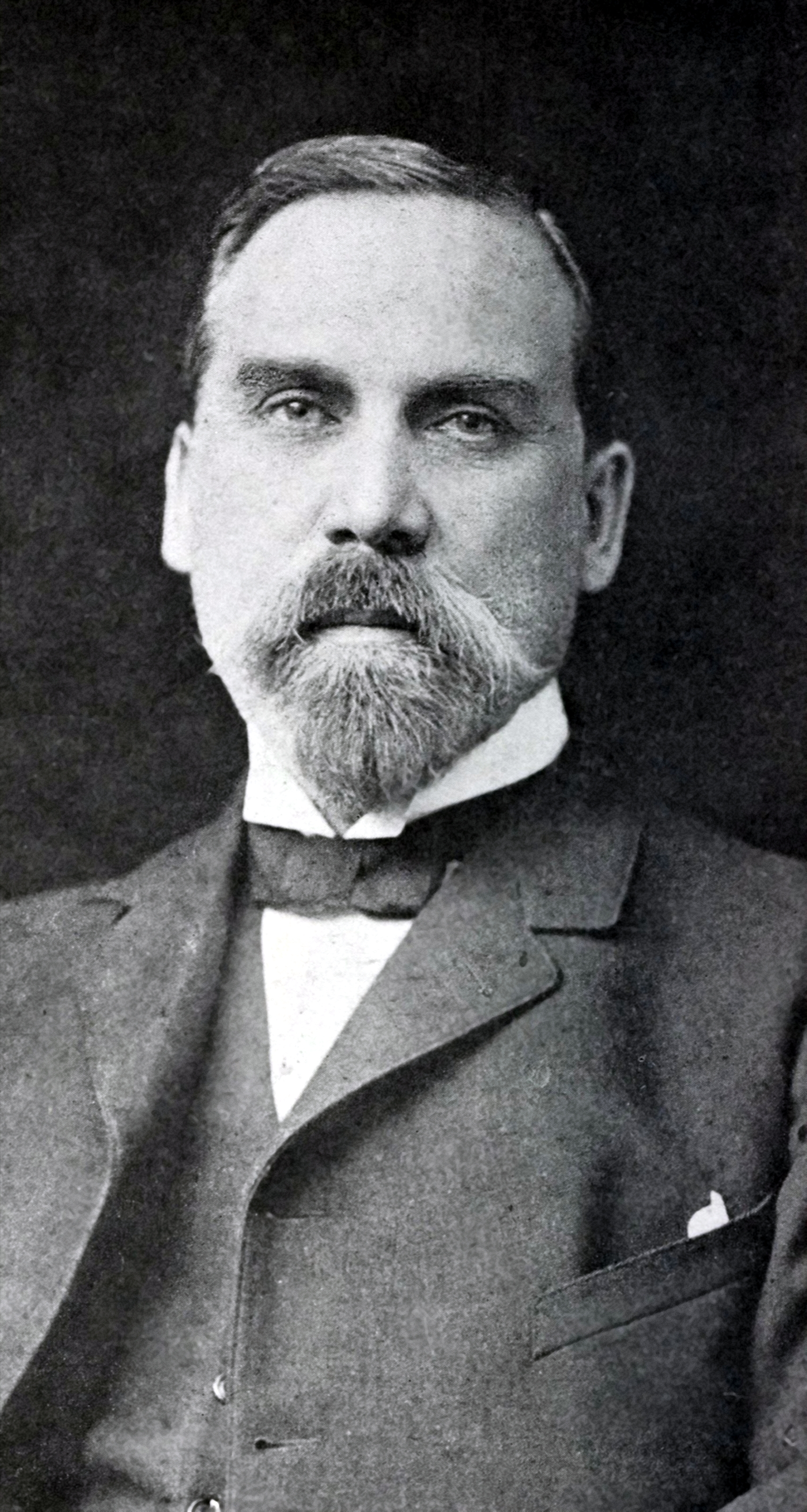
- Born: October 17, 1853; Canterbury, New Zealand
- Died: July 7, 1936 (aged 82); Makaweli, Kauaʻi, Hawaii
- Occupations: Planter, Rancher

Aubrey Robinson (October 17, 1853 – July 7, 1936) was an owner of the Hawaiian island of Niihau, a sugarcane plantation developer, and a rancher.

== Life ==
Aubrey Robinson was born in Canterbury, New Zealand, on October 17, 1853. His father was Charles Barrington Robinson and mother was Helen Sinclair. His grandmother, Elizabeth McHutchison (1800–1892), also spelled McHutcheson, was born in Glasgow, Scotland, married Francis Sinclair in 1824 and moved to New Zealand in 1840 with their six children. In 1846 her husband and eldest son died at sea. With her remaining children and grandchildren, she left New Zealand heading for Canada. When they arrived in the Hawaiian Islands in September 1863, King Kamehameha IV suggested they stay and purchase some land. Although the King soon died, the family purchased the entire island of Niʻihau from King Kamehameha V for US$10,000 ($206,000 today) on January 23, 1864. In 1865, Eliza Sinclair purchased the 21,844-acre (88.4 km^{2}) ahupuaʻa of Makaweli, on Kauaʻi, from Victoria Kamāmalu Ka‘ahumanu for $15,000 ($315,000 today).

Robinson was educated at home and attended the Boston University School of Law and was admitted to the bar in eastern courts. He spent a number of years traveling in Europe and Asia, and, on his return to Hawaii, managed the family estates after the death of his uncle Francis Sinclair with his cousin (also brother-in-law), Francis Gay, under the firm name of Gay & Robinson. Other partners were Elizabeth Sinclair, Jane Sinclair Gay and Helen Sinclair Robinson. Their island of Niʻihau was used exclusively by Gay & Robinson for grazing cattle, as was much of their Makaweli estate. Robinson raised pure-bred sheep and cattle, and imported strains of Merino sheep and shorthorn cattle from the United States, Australia and New Zealand.

Robinson developed the Makaweli sugar plantation on Kauaʻi, on which the Hawaiian Sugar Company leased about 6,000 acres (24 km^{2}). Besides this land, the firm of Gay & Robinson had a sugar plantation of more than 1,000 acres (4.0 km^{2}) on the same estate. In 1884, Robinson imported purebred Arabian horses. Robinson took an active interest in church and missionary work both in Hawaii and abroad.

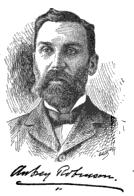
Aubrey Robinson in 1901

== Family and legacy ==
His aunt Anne Sinclair married Kauaʻi sugar planter Valdemar Knudsen (1819–1898) in 1867. Robinson married his first cousin Alice Gay in 1885, daughter of Captain Thomas Gay and Jane (Sinclair) Gay. They had four sons: Sinclair Robinson (1886–1964), Aylmer Francis Robinson (1888–1967), Selwyn Aubrey Robinson (1892–1984), and Lester Beauclerk Robinson (1901–1969) and one daughter, Eleanor (1898–1986).

Robinson died on his estate in 1936, and the Kauai estate passed to his wife and their five children and Niihau going to Aylmer and Lester. His descendants have kept the tradition of treating Niʻihau as private, earning it the name "Forbidden Island". Niʻihau was owned by Lester's wife Helen Matthew Robinson (1910–2002) and then as of 2008, her sons Bruce and Keith Robinson.

Sinclair-Robinson family tree

Francis W. Sinclair (1797–1846) | Elizabeth McHutcheson (1800–1892)
George Sinclair (d. 1846) | Charles B. Robinson | Helen Sinclair | Jane Sinclair (d. 1916) | Thomas Gay (d. 1865) | James Sinclair (d. 1873) | Francis Sinclair (d. 1916) | Isabella McHutcheson (d. 1900) | Anne Sinclair (1839–1922) | Valdemar Knudsen (1819–1898)
Aubrey Robinson (1853–1936) | Alice Gay | Francis Gay | Eric Alfred Knudsen (1872–1957)
Aylmer Robinson (1888–1967) | Lester Beauclerk Robinson (1901–1969) | Helen Matthew (1910–2002)
Keith Robinson (b. 1941) | Bruce Robinson

== See also ==
- Sugar plantations in Hawaii
