= Keith Robinson (environmentalist) =

American environmentalist who is the co-owner of Niʻihau, Hawaiian island

- Born: 1940 or 1941 (age 85–86)
- Education: University of California, Davis
- Known for: Co-owner of Niʻihau
- Relatives: Aubrey Robinson (grandfather)

Keith Robinson is an American environmentalist who is the co-owner of Niʻihau, the second-smallest of the eight principal Hawaiian Islands.

== Early life ==
Keith Robinson was born c. 1941 to Lester Beauclerk Robinson (1901–1969) and Helen Matthew Robinson (1910–2002). He has a brother, Bruce Robinson.

He attended the University of California, Davis, graduating with a degree in agronomy and ranch management.

== Career and land ownership ==
After college, Keith served in the US Army. Subsequently, he returned to Hawaii, where he initially worked at the Ko’olau Ranch on Oahu for seven years and then operated a commercial fishing vessel on Kauaʻi for another seven years.

Robinson and his brother Bruce own the approximately 70-square-mile (180 km^{2}) island of Niʻihau in the Hawaiian island chain, which has been in the private possession of their family since their great-great-grandmother Elizabeth McHutcheson Sinclair (1800–1892) purchased it from King Kamehameha V for US$10,000 in gold. He is also the manager of a private botanical garden on the Hawaiian island of Kauaʻi.

=== Conservation work on Niʻihau ===
Robinson has been credited for keeping numerous Hawaiian plants from becoming extinct, including Cyanea pinnatifida, which is considered extinct in the wild.

I've spent eighteen years and more than $250,000 doing this work, and I estimate it would cost the government or environmental groups $10–20 million to create a comparable reserve. I've done all phases of it myself; scouting, seed collecting, seed germination, planting, transplanting, watering, growing, fencing, fertilizing, and insecticide spraying. In most environmental groups or botanical gardens, the work is highly compartmentalized. You get your plant scouts, your seed collectors, your nurserymen, and people on the grounds. They all have different duties, and their duties never change, so none of them has a broad overview of what's going on. They don't know what specific problems there are at various stages where you're trying to produce the plants.

== Contemporary activities ==
Robinson has repeatedly expressed his desire to keep Niʻihau privately owned so as to preserve the environment and traditions of its 150 to 200 native Hawaiian inhabitants, and has occasionally taken large financial losses to do so. Robinson's grandfather, Aubrey, largely closed Niʻihau to outside visitors in 1915. His grandsons have maintained this practice, though a few hunters and other tourists are admitted each year—but with limited or no contact with the islanders. The Robinsons continue to ban radios, televisions and mobile phones on the island, in an effort to preserve as much of the indigenous island culture as possible. In 1997, Robinson estimated that between $8–9 million was spent to keep people employed, not counting the free housing and free meat provided to the 150–200 Niʻihau islanders. After 135 years of operation, the ranch on the island shut down in 1999, rendering all its inhabitants unemployed.

In 1998, Robinson expressed concerns about his family's ability to continue to maintain their ownership of Niʻihau, due to pressure from the federal and state governments and environmental groups. Taxes on the island had taken much of the profits from the Robinsons' interests in agricultural companies.

In 2005 a documentary entitled Robinson Crusader was released about Robinson's conservation work and ownership of Niʻihau.

== Family tree ==
Sinclair-Robinson family tree

Francis W. Sinclair (1797–1846)	Elizabeth McHutcheson (1800–1892)
George Sinclair (d. 1846)	Charles B. Robinson	Helen Sinclair	Jane Sinclair (d. 1916)	Thomas Gay (d. 1865)	James Sinclair (d. 1873)	Francis Sinclair (d. 1916)	Isabella McHutcheson (d. 1900)	Anne Sinclair (1839–1922)	Valdemar Knudsen (1819–1898)
Aubrey Robinson (1853–1936)	Alice Gay	Francis Gay	Eric Alfred Knudsen (1872–1957)
Aylmer Robinson (1888–1967)	Lester Beauclerk Robinson (1901–1969)	Helen Matthew (1910–2002)
Keith Robinson (b. 1941)	Bruce Robinson
