= Japanese internment camp =

Japanese internment camp may refer to:

- Internment of Japanese Americans in the United States during World War II
- Japanese internment at Ellis Island during World War II
- Internment of Japanese Canadians in Canada during World War II
- List of Japanese-run internment camps during World War II
