= Elizabeth Sinclair =

British farmer and plantation owner in New Zealand and Hawaii

Elizabeth McHutcheson Sinclair
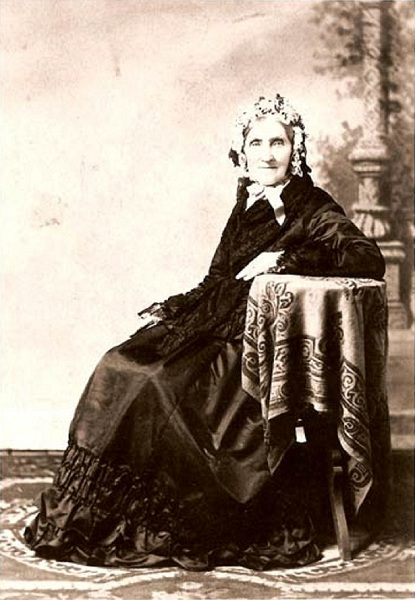
- Photograph taken by James J. Williams
- Born: 26 April 1800; Glasgow, Scotland
- Died: 16 October 1892 (aged 92); Makaweli, Kauaʻi, Hawaiʻi
- Occupations: Farmer, rancher, landowner
- Known for: matriarch of the Sinclair family that bought the Hawaiian island of Niʻihau
- Spouse: Francis W. Sinclair
- Children: George, Jane, Helen, James, Francis and Anne
- Parent(s): William (or James) McHutcheson and Jean Robertson

Elizabeth McHutcheson Sinclair (26 April 1800 – 16 October 1892) was a Scottish homemaker, farmer, and plantation owner in New Zealand and Hawaii, best known as the matriarch of the Sinclair family that bought the Hawaiian island of Niʻihau in 1864. Born in Glasgow, Scotland, she married Francis Sinclair, a ship's captain. With six children in tow, the family moved to New Zealand. Her husband and eldest son (and much of the family's property) were later lost at sea.

After years of farming, mainly at Pigeon Bay on the Banks Peninsula in the Canterbury region of the South Island, she decided to relocate to Canada. Unhappy with the conditions she found on Vancouver Island, she considered California but instead went to Hawaii where she bought the Hawaiian island of Niʻihau for US$10,000 (equivalent to about $206,000 in 2025). This would have been roughly 530 troy ounces of gold, which in 2024 would be worth about $1,269,000. She later bought additional lands at Hanapepe and Makaweli on the island of Kauaʻi. Her descendants, the Robinson family, continue to own and maintain the island of Niʻihau.

== Early life ==
Elizabeth Sinclair was born in Glasgow, Scotland, on 26 April 1800. Known as "Eliza", she was one of six children born to William (or James) a successful merchant, and Jean Robertson McHutcheson (sometimes spelled "McHutchison"). Eliza married Captain Francis W. Sinclair (1797–1846) of the Royal Navy on 13 January 1824. They had three sons and three daughters. Sinclair was considered a master navigator, best known for saving the life of the Duke of Wellington in rough seas while escorting him on his return from the Battle of Waterloo in 1815.

== New Zealand ==
The Sinclairs moved to New Zealand, arriving in 1841; they settled in Pigeon Bay in 1843. Eliza's husband and her oldest son George disappeared at sea in 1846 during a business trip headed towards Wellington. Her husband was carrying all the family's cash and produce supplies. After their disappearance, Eliza and her five remaining children were left to survive on their own. Eventually, with her children marrying and producing grandchildren, the Sinclairs needed more land, and Eliza's son Francis helped plan a new voyage towards that end. They sold their property in New Zealand and sailed to the Pacific Northwest of North America with the goal of acquiring property in British Columbia.

== Pacific Northwest ==
In early June 1863, the Bessie arrived in Victoria, British Columbia on Vancouver Island. The Sinclairs found the land wild and undeveloped with thick forests, making the effort required to clear land for agriculture close to impossible with their limited labor and resources. Eliza set her sights on California, but an acquaintance named Henry Rhodes recommended that they avoid the rough oceans during the winter as it would make anchorage difficult. Rhodes suggested that they sail to the Sandwich Islands (Hawaii) instead, since his brother lived in Honolulu. The Sinclairs agreed, and they boarded the Bessie one last time.

== Hawaii ==
At the age of 63 years, Eliza led 13 members of her family to Hawaii, arriving in Honolulu Harbor on 17 September 1863 on the vessel Bessiecaptained by her son-in-law, Thomas Gay. The 300-ton barque arrived fully provisioned, with Merino sheep, one cow, hay, grain, chickens, a grand piano, books, and clothing. Eliza was considered a "chiefess" by the native Hawaiians she and her family employed on the island of Niʻihau and in Makaweli on Kauaʻi.

In 1885, her niece Isabella McHutcheson Sinclair, who married Eliza's son Francis, authored and illustrated Indigenous Flowers of the Hawaiian Islands which has become an important record of the Hawaiian flora. The illustrations are of plants from Kauaʻi and Niʻihau islands.

== Descendants ==
Her descendants continue to run the island of Ni'ihau under their private ownership.

Sinclair-Robinson family tree

Francis W. Sinclair (1797–1846)	Elizabeth McHutcheson (1800–1892)
George Sinclair (d. 1846)	Charles B. Robinson	Helen Sinclair	Jane Sinclair (d. 1916)	Thomas Gay (d. 1865)	James Sinclair (d. 1873)	Francis Sinclair (d. 1916)	Isabella McHutcheson (d. 1900)	Anne Sinclair (1839–1922)	Valdemar Knudsen (1819–1898)
Aubrey Robinson (1853–1936)	Alice Gay	Francis Gay	Eric Alfred Knudsen (1872–1957)
Aylmer Robinson (1888–1967)	Lester Beauclerk Robinson (1901–1969)	Helen Matthew (1910–2002)
Keith Robinson (b. 1941)	Bruce Robinson
