= Pākalā Village, Hawaii =

Pākalā Village
- Census-designated place
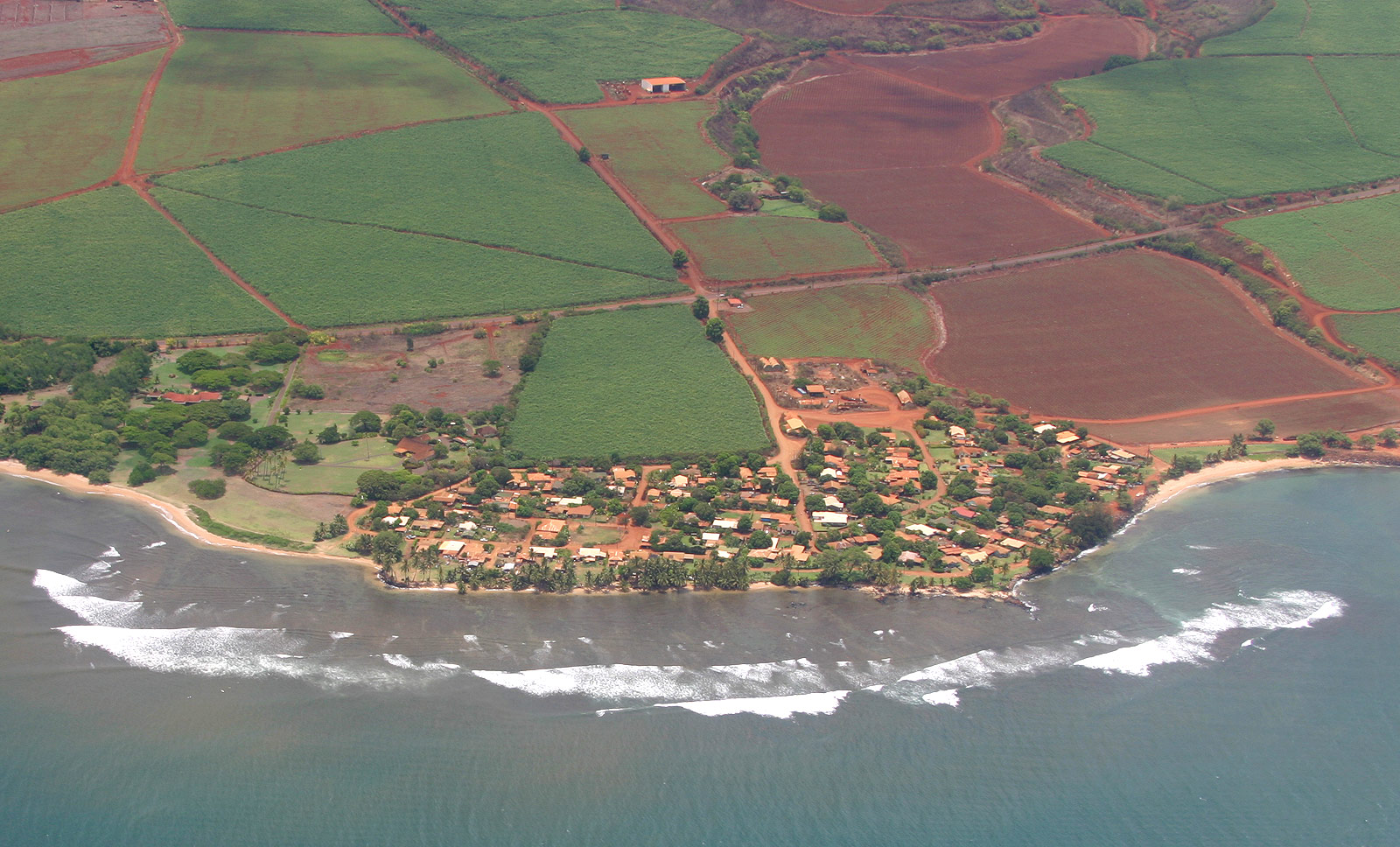
- Aerial view of Pakala Village

- Location in Kauaʻi County and the state of Hawaii
- Coordinates: 21°56′6″N 159°38′38″W
- Country: United States
- State: Hawaii
- County: Kauaʻi

Area
  - Total: 2.74 sq mi (7.09 km^{2})
  - Land: 2.39 sq mi (6.20 km^{2})
  - Water: 0.34 sq mi (0.89 km^{2})
- Elevation: 40 ft (12 m)

Population (2020)
  - Total: 286
  - Density: 119.4/sq mi (46.09/km^{2})
- Time zone: UTC-10 (Hawaii-Aleutian)
- Area code: 808
- FIPS code: 15-60350
- GNIS feature ID: 0362986

Pākalā Village (literally, "the sun shines" in Hawaiian) is a census-designated place (CDP) in Kauaʻi County, Hawaiʻi, United States. The population was 286 at the 2020 census.

== History ==
Pākalā Village is also called "Pākalā Camp", named for the temporary living quarters of plantation workers. Pākalā Camp consisted of employee and retiree housing for workers at the Gay & Robinson sugarcane plantation in the ahupuaʻa of Makaweli, the last remaining sugarcane plantation on Kauai. The plantation was managed by the Robinson family of Kauaʻi and Niʻihau, who first arrived in Hawaii in 1863.

== Geography ==
Pākalā Village is located on the southwest shore of the island of Kauaʻi at 21°56′36″N 159°38′52″W (21.943221, -159.647658). It is bordered to the northwest by Waimea and to the southwest by the Pacific Ocean. The community of Pākalā Village is in the southwest part of the CDP, next to the Pacific. The CDP also includes the community of Kaawanui Village in the northeast. Hawaii Route 50 passes through the middle of the CDP, between the two settlements. The highway leads northwest 2 miles (3 km) into Waimea and southeast 1.5 miles (2.4 km) to Kaumakani.

According to the United States Census Bureau, the CDP has a total area of 2.7 square miles (7.1 km^{2}), of which 2.4 square miles (6.2 km^{2}) are land and 0.3 square miles (0.9 km^{2}), or 12.51%, are water. The CDP is served by the ZIP code 96769 and its post office is known as "Makaweli".

== Demographics ==
Historical population
Census	Pop.	Note	%±
2020	286		—
U.S. Decennial Census

As of the census of 2000, there were 478 people, 150 households, and 121 families residing in the CDP. The population density was 204.7 inhabitants per square mile (79.0/km^{2}). There were 172 housing units at an average density of 73.6 per square mile (28.4/km^{2}). The racial makeup of the CDP was 14% White, <1% African American, 37% Asian, 26% Pacific Islander, <1% from other races, and 22% from two or more races. Hispanic or Latino of any race were 6% of the population.

There were 150 households, out of which 25% had children under the age of 18 living with them, 64% were married couples living together, 10% had a female householder with no husband present, and 19% were non-families. 18% of all households were made up of individuals, and 15% had someone living alone who was 65 years of age or older. The average household size was 3.19 and the average family size was 3.66.

In the CDP the population was spread out, with 29% under the age of 18, 6% from 18 to 24, 21% from 25 to 44, 22% from 45 to 64, and 24% who were 65 years of age or older. The median age was 41 years. For every 100 females, there were 115.3 males. For every 100 females age 18 and over, there were 102.4 males.

The median income for a household in the CDP was $24,464, and the median income for a family was $29,000. Males had a median income of $21,875 versus $14,750 for females. The per capita income for the CDP was $9,846. About 33% of families and 44% of the population were below the poverty line, including 69% of those under age 18 and 26% of those age 65 or over.
