= Kekaha Sugar Company =

Now-defunct plantation company in western Kauai

The Kekaha Sugar Company was a sugar company on the island of Kauaʻi in Hawaiʻi.

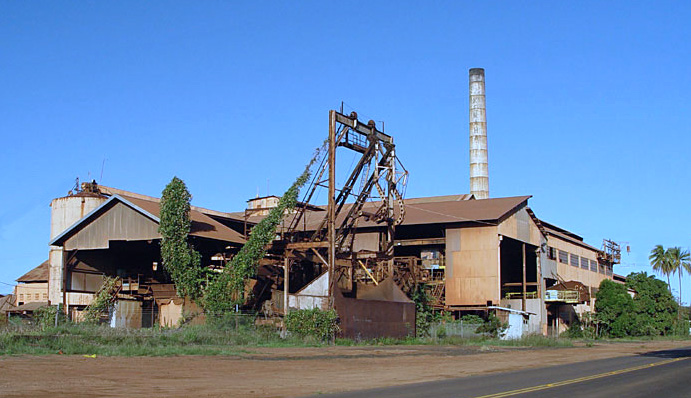
Kekaha Sugar Mill

== History ==
In 1878, Valdemar Knudsen and Hans L'Orange planted the first commercially grown sugar cane in Kekaha. By 1886, Knudsen had leased land for another track of sugar cultivation in Mana. By the mid-1880s the Isenberg family was operating a sugar mill in Kekaha. In 1898, the plantations in Mana and Kekaha were consolidated with the Kekaha Sugar Mill Company to form the Kekaha Sugar Company (KSC).

In February 1920, a local fisherman stole $11,000 (~$172,656 in 2024) from a KSC train that was carrying wages from Kekaha to Mana. This theft is believed to be Hawaiʻi's only train robbery.

In 1938, the Honolulu Star-Advertiser stated that the KSC sugar operation was the most valuable single piece of property in the Territory of Hawaii.

In 1940, the U.S. Army acquired KSC's airfield in Mana and named it the Mana Airport. During World War II, the airport (renamed the Barking Sands Air Base) was a major base for military air operations in the war's Pacific Theater. In 1957 the base was transferred to the Navy, and in 1964 was renamed Pacific Missile Range Facility (PMRF), Barking Sands. PMRF is currently the world's largest instrumented, multi-dimensional testing and training missile range.

In 1975 KSC was acquired by Amfac Sugar Hawaii. In 2000, Amfac closed the last of KSC's operations, the Kekaha Sugar Mill.

== See also ==
- History of sugar
- Sugar plantations in Hawaii
