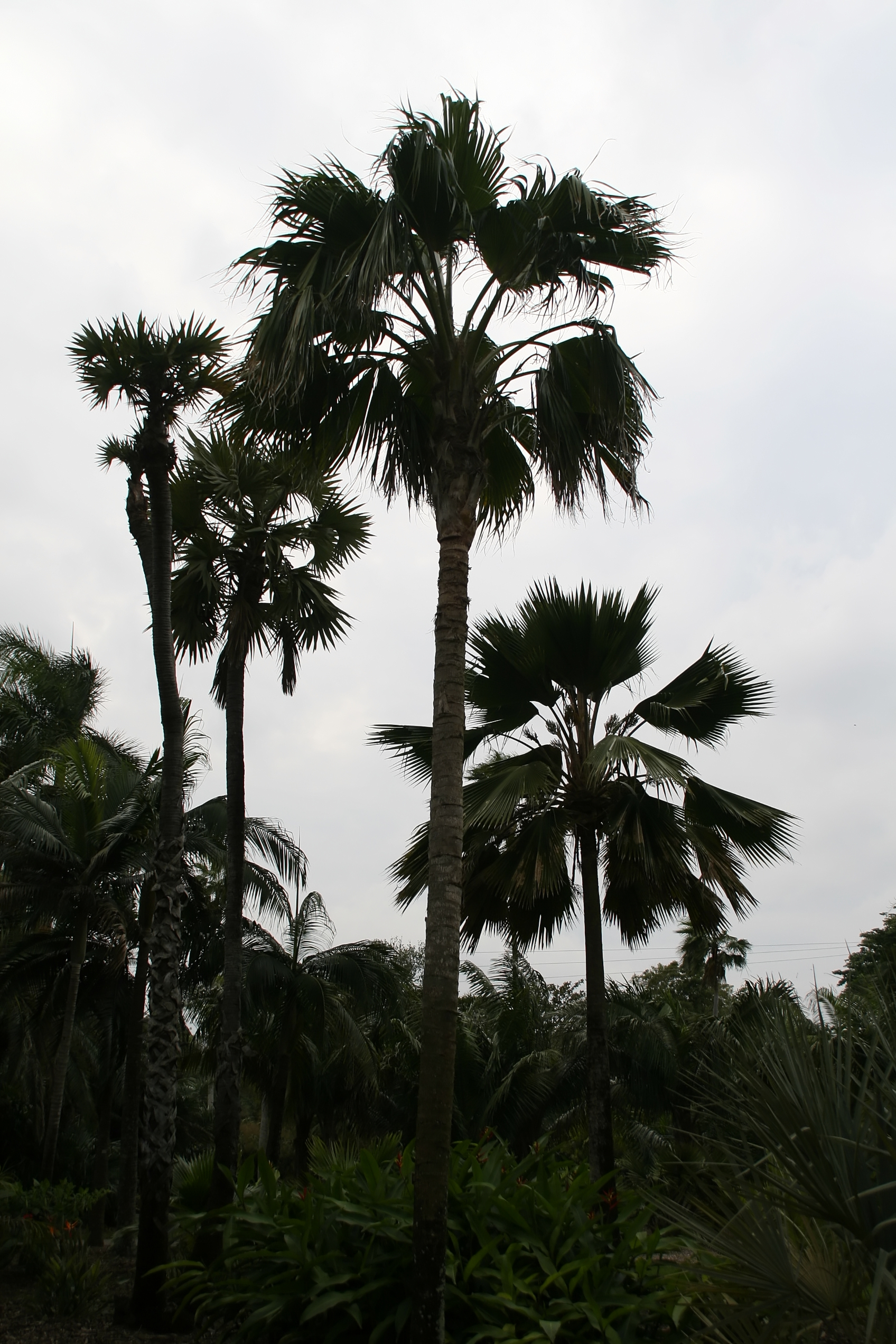

Conservation status
- Critically Endangered (IUCN 2.3)

Scientific classification
- Kingdom: Plantae
- Clade: Tracheophytes
- Clade: Angiosperms
- Clade: Monocots
- Clade: Commelinids
- Order: Arecales
- Family: Arecaceae
- Tribe: Trachycarpeae
- Genus: Pritchardia
- Species: P. aylmer-robinsonii

Binomial name
- Pritchardia aylmer-robinsonii H.St.John

Synonyms
- Pritchardia remota ssp. aylmer-robinsonii (H.St.John) R.W.Read

= Pritchardia aylmer-robinsonii =

Species of palm

Pritchardia aylmer-robinsonii is a species of palm tree that is endemic to the island of Niʻihau, Hawaii, United States. It inhabits coastal dry forests at an elevation of 70–270 m (230–890 ft). P. aylmer-robinsonii reaches a height of 7–15 m (23–49 ft) and a trunk diameter of 20–30 cm (7.9–11.8 in). Harold St. John discovered this species in 1949, and the specific epithet refers to Aylmer Francis Robinson, a member of the family that owned the island. P. aylmer-robinsonii has been reintroduced to the Makauwahi Cave Reserve on Kauaʻi, where the species is believed to have previously ranged.
