= Pacific Missile Range Facility =

United States naval facility and airport in Hawaii

Pacific Missile Range Facility Barking Sands
- Near Kekaha, Hawaii in the United States
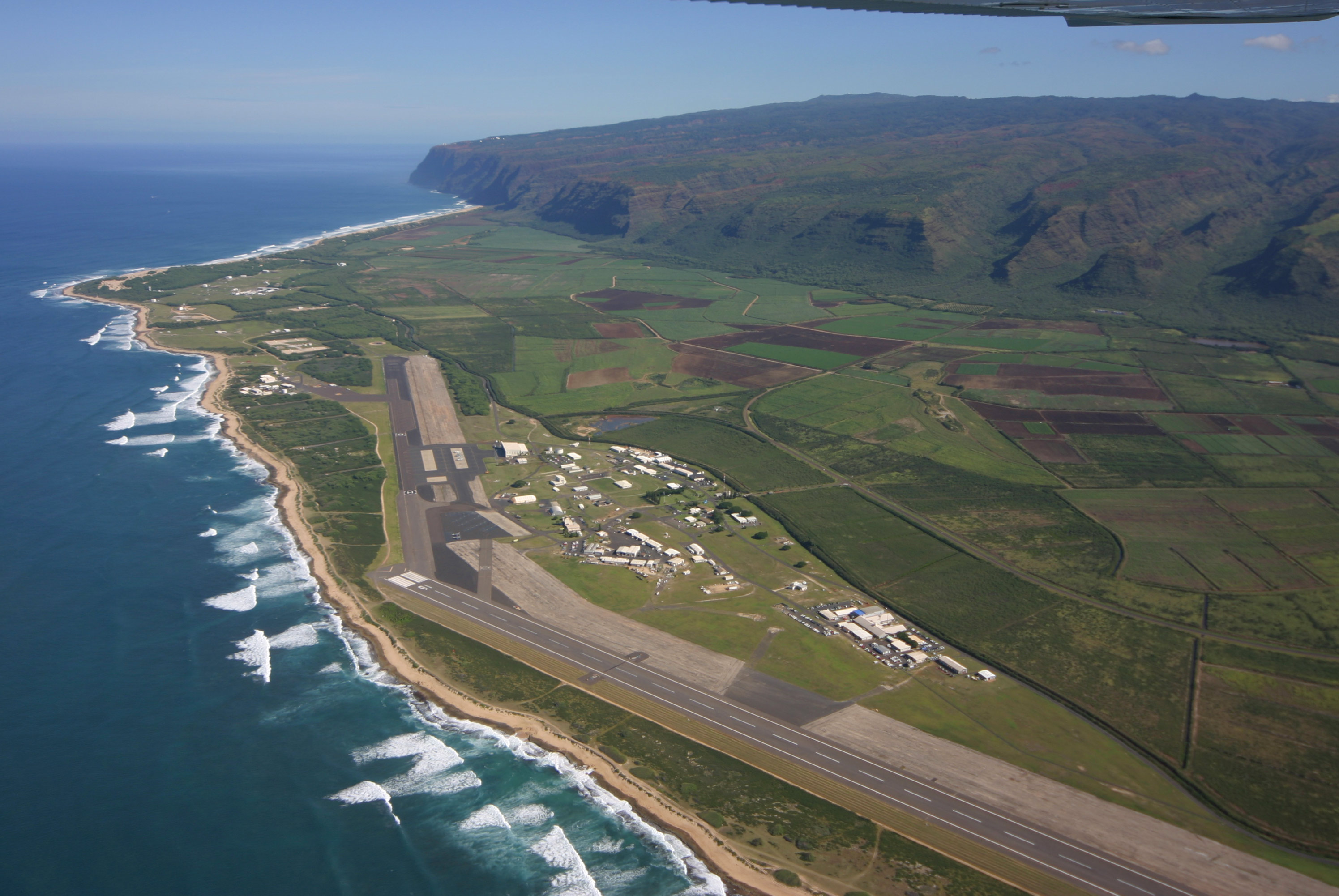
- Aerial view of the airfield at PMRF Barking Sands

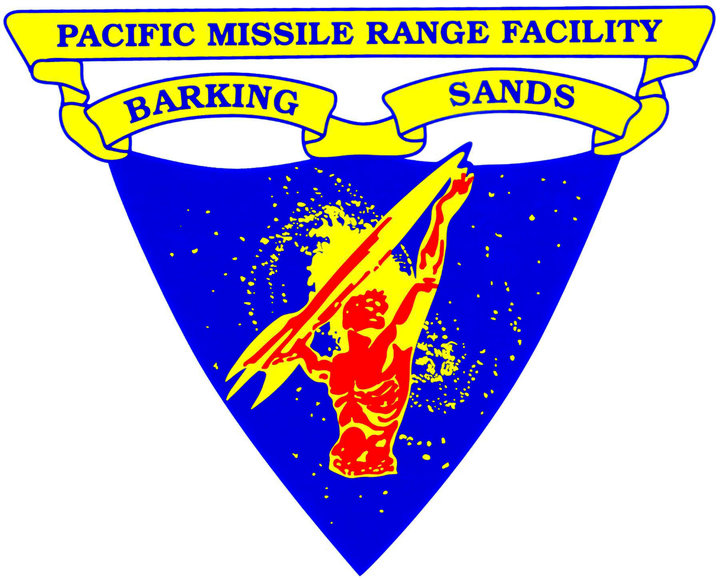

Site information
- Type: Test & training range and airfield
- Owner: Department of Defense
- Operator: US Navy
- Controlled by: Navy Region Hawaii
- Condition: Operational
- Website: Official website

Location
- Location of PMRF Barking Sands airfield in Hawaii
- Coordinates: 22°01′22″N 159°47′06″W
- Area: 42,000 square miles (110,000 km^{2}) (controlled airspace); 1,100 square miles (2,800 km^{2}) (underwater range)

Site history
- Built: 1921 (for Kekaha Sugar Company)
- In use: 1940–1942 (US Army Air Forces); 1942–1957 (US Air Force); 1957–present (US Navy)

Garrison information
- Current commander: Captain Timothy H. Young

Airfield information
- Identifiers: IATA: BKH, ICAO: PHBK, FAA LID: BKH, WMO: 911620
- Elevation: 5.4 metres (18 ft) AMSL
Runways
Direction	Length and surface
16/34	1,829.4 metres (6,002 ft) Asphalt

The Pacific Missile Range Facility, Barking Sands (IATA: BKH, ICAO: PHBK, FAA LID: BKH) is a U.S. naval facility and airport located five nautical miles (9 km) northwest of the central business district of Kekaha, in Kauaʻi County, Hawaii, United States.

PMRF is the world's largest instrumented, multi-dimensional testing and training missile range. The US military and its contractors favor its relative isolation, ideal year-round tropical climate and encroachment-free environment (see PMRF Agriculture Preservation Initiative below). It is the only range in the world where submarines, surface ships, aircraft and space vehicles can operate and be tracked simultaneously. There are over 1,100 square miles (2,800 km^{2}) of instrumented underwater range and over 42,000 square miles (109,000 km^{2}) of controlled airspace. The base itself covers roughly 2,385 acres (965 ha).

The base includes a 6,000-foot (1,800 m) runway with operations and maintenance facilities. It has roughly 70 housing units and various recreational facilities for those who can access the base.

The base has support facilities at Port Allen, Makaha Ridge, and Kokeʻe State Park. The base also uses a portion of the nearby island of Niʻihau for a remotely operated APS-134 surveillance radar, an 1,100-acre (450 ha) Test Vehicle Recovery Site, the Perch Electronic Warfare site, multiple EW Portable Simulator sites, and a Helicopter Terrain Flight training course.

== History ==
In 1921, the land area known as the Barking Sands was acquired by the Kekaha Sugar Company and became a runway for private planes. In 1928 Charles Kingsford Smith, a record-setting Australian aviator, took off with his four-man crew from a sandy runway here to fly non-stop to Fiji. They had arrived in Hawaii at Wheeler Army Airfield, but left from Barking Sands as Wheeler was not long enough to take off with their heavy load. The U.S. Army acquired the land in 1940, named it Mana Airport, and paved the runway. Additional land acquired in 1941 expanded the facility to 2,058 acres (833 ha). Private airlines frequently utilized the airport, and World War II incurred a great deal of military flight operations. The base was officially designated Bonham Air Force Base in 1954. U.S. Navy operations at Bonham began in 1956, with testing of the Regulus I missile. In 1958, the Pacific Missile Range Facility was established to support the growing demand of the Navy at Bonham. In 1964, the Pacific Missile Range Facility and Bonham was transferred to the Navy, becoming Pacific Missile Range Facility, Barking Sands.

== Missile tests ==
In 1962, the U.S. military conducted the Frigate Bird Test of the Operation Dominic program near PMRF. The military launched an operational ballistic missile with a live warhead from the USS Ethan Allen (SSBN-608), which was situated near PMRF. The nuclear warhead flew toward Christmas Island and detonated in an air burst at 11,000 feet (3,400 m).

The Navy is currently using PMRF to test "hit to kill" technology using direct collision of the anti-ballistic missile with its target. This destroys the target by using only kinetic energy from the force of the collision. The two Missile Defense Agency programs that currently utilize the range at PMRF are the Navy's Aegis Ballistic Missile Defense System and the Army's Terminal High Altitude Area Defense System, or THAAD. The THAAD program relocated their testing operations from the White Sands Missile Range in New Mexico and conducted its first demonstration at PMRF on 26 January 2007.

On 27 April 2007, the U.S. military's sea-based missile defense system, the Aegis Ballistic Missile Defense System, showed it could intercept two targets simultaneously when it destroyed a cruise missile and a short-range ballistic missile during a test off the Hawaiian island of Kauai. The test marked eight out of ten times the Missile Defense Agency and U.S. Navy's Aegis missile defense system successfully intercepted its target, but was the first time the system knocked out two targets at the same time.

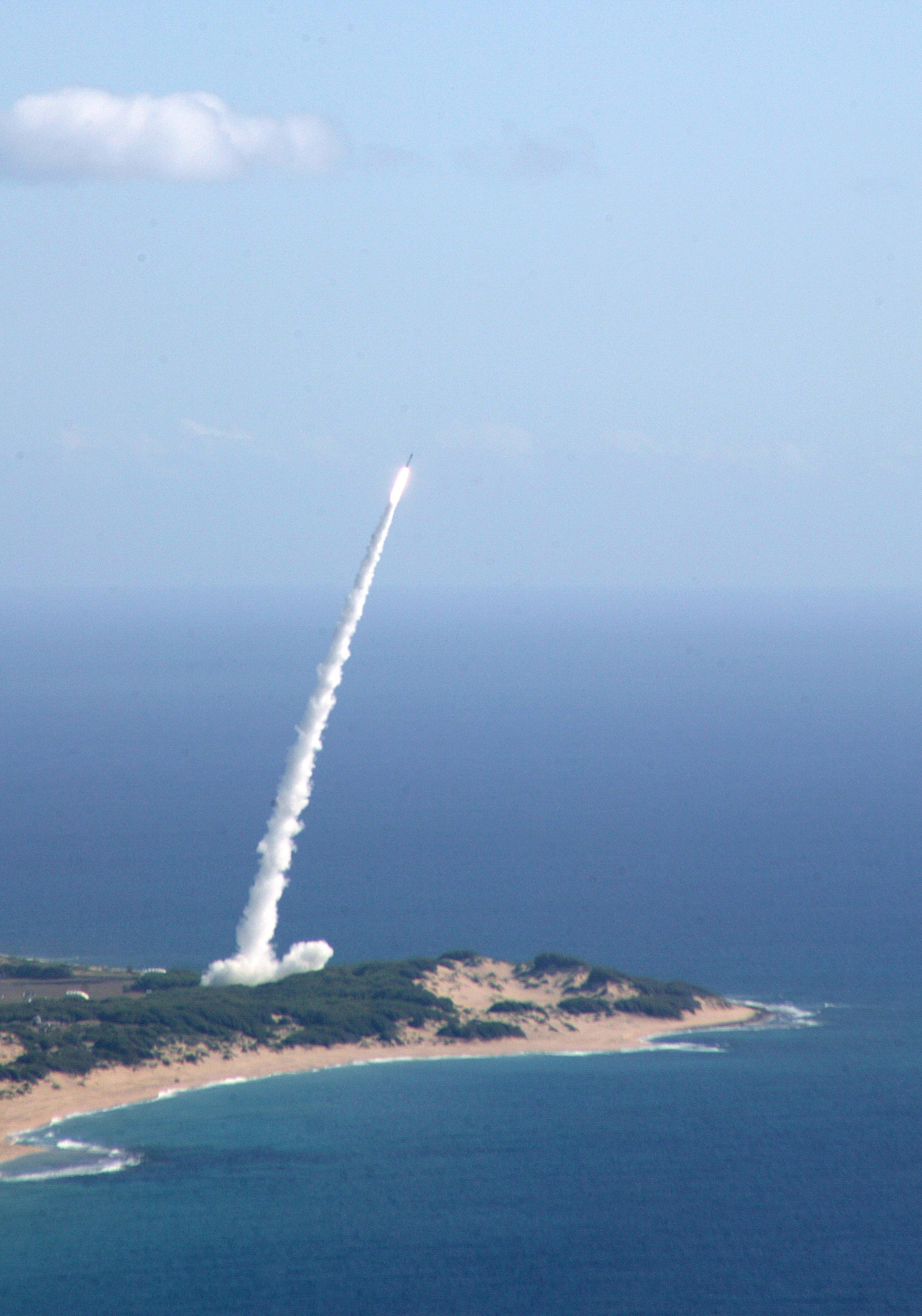
Target ballistic missile launch from Barking Sands, to test SM-3 missile interception

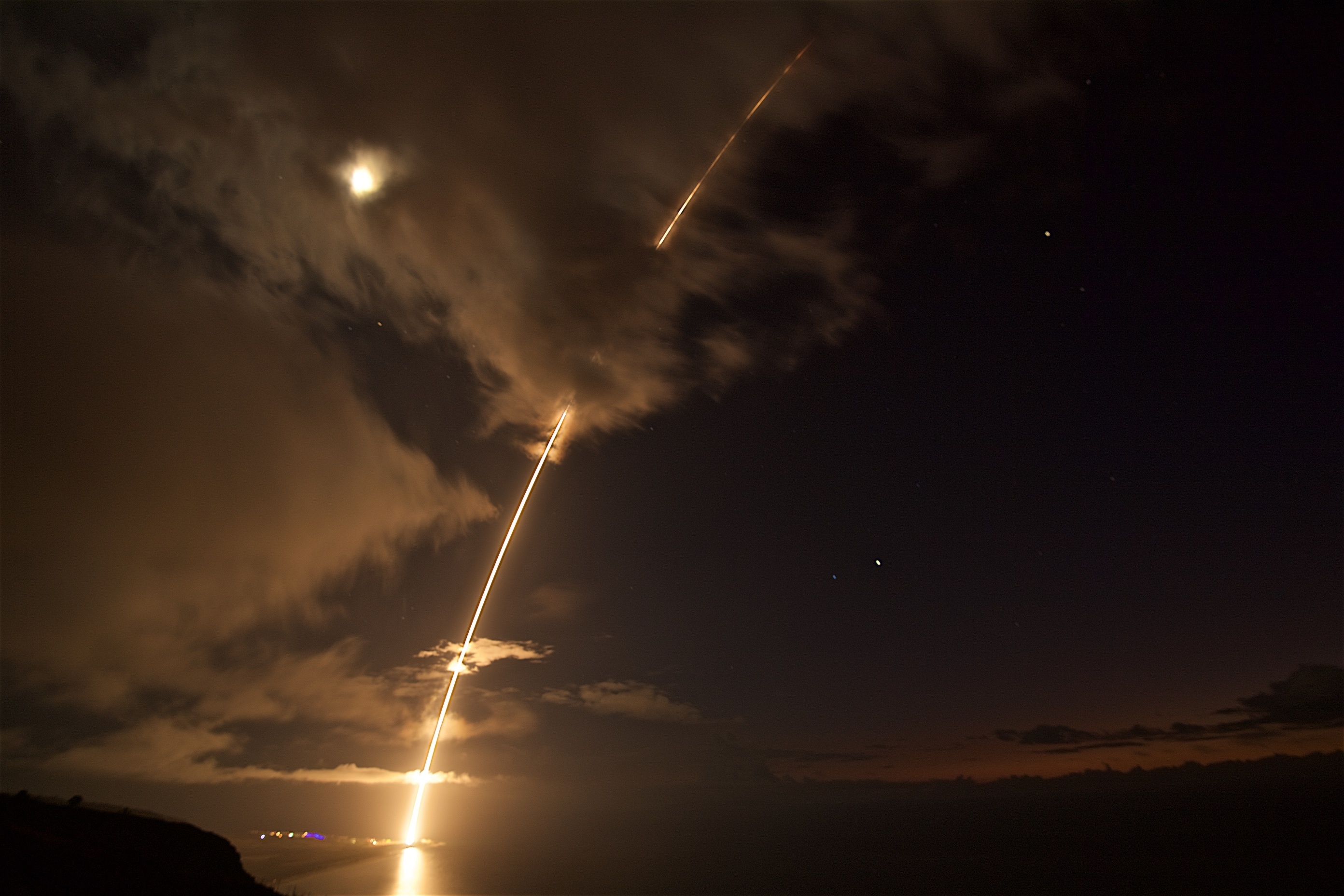
Target ballistic missile launch from Barking Sands, to test SM-6 missile interception

== PMRF Agriculture Preservation Initiative ==
The Navy is currently working with the State of Hawaii and Kauaʻi County to ensure the long-term viability of PMRF. For many decades, the land adjacent to PMRF was used for sugarcane fields, which was wholly compatible with operations at PMRF. Since Kekaha Sugar's closure, the Navy has become wary of "encroachment", incompatible developments, that might occur on the land next to the base. In order to ensure that PMRF can continue to safely conduct important research and training operations in the future, the Navy and some citizens of Kauai are seeking to permanently preserve the land adjacent to PMRF for agricultural purposes. Under the PMRF Agriculture Preservation Initiative the Navy would have the roughly 6,000 acres (2,400 ha) of land adjacent to PMRF preserved solely for agricultural use. Although the Navy has stated that it would like to lease about 300 acres (120 ha) of land, it has also stated that its main goal is not to purchase more land but to merely ensure the land continues to be used for agricultural purposes.

== Operational deployment of THAAD ==
When North Korea threatened to launch Taepodong-2 ICBMs toward Hawaii in 2009, the US temporarily deployed a THAAD missile unit to the facility.

== Range programs ==
The range hosted the following programs:

- Able III & IV
- ADTS
- Atlas
- Bullpup (A) & (B)
- Caleb Satellite
- Centaur
- Composite Radiation Satellite
- Corvus I
- Courier
- Discoverer
- Dyna-Soar
- Eagle
- Falcon
- Hawk
- Hummingbird
- Hydra
- Hyperjet
- Jaguar (Probe)
- Mach 2 Expendable Target
- Mach 2 Recoverable Target
- Mercury
- Midas
- Minuteman
- MORT (Fleet Training)
- NERV
- Nike-Zeus
- NORT (Fleet Training)
- Ozarc
- Pershing
- Phoenix
- Regulus I
- Rella
- Samos-Atlas
- Scout
- Sergeant
- Sidewinder
- Sparrow III
- Sunflare
- Talos
- Tartar
- Tepee
- Terrier I
- Thor
- Tiros
- Titan
- Tophat
- Transit
- Tumbleweed
- Typhon

== See also ==
- Eastern Test Range
- Hawaii World War II Army Airfields
- List of United States Navy airfields
- WWVH, a time signal radio station on the grounds of the PMRF
