= Japanese internment at Ellis Island =

Mass incarceration of Japanese during WWII

Japanese internment at Ellis Island was the internment of Japanese-Americans living on the East Coast of the United States during World War II. They were held at an internment camp on Ellis Island. The main factor that led to Japanese internment at Ellis Island was New York mayor Fiorello La Guardia ordering Japanese-Americans to be arrested. This was followed by Franklin Delano Roosevelt's Executive Order 9066 which initiated the mass internment of Japanese-Americans all over the United States. Other factors that led to the Japanese internment at Ellis Island include the Niihau Incident which increased the public's fear that Japanese residents were not loyal to the United States. This fear that Japanese-Americans might be spies for Japan was particularly threatening to the U.S. code-breaking efforts. Many people challenged the constitutionality of the Japanese internment in the Supreme Court.

== Factors leading to Japanese internment ==
President Franklin Delano Roosevelt declared war on December 8, 1941, one day after the attack on Pearl Harbor. Shortly after Mayor Fiorello La Guardia ordered Japanese Nationalists to be rounded up and sent to Ellis Island indefinitely. LaGuardia's order happened before Executive Order 9066 which was issued on February 19, 1942. This order, given by President Roosevelt, triggered the internment of 110,000 American citizens of Japanese descent across the United States. Just 24 hours after the attack on Pearl Harbor, 121 Japanese New Yorkers were arrested. By the middle of December, this number had increased to 279 Japanese-American New York residents.

=== Niihau incident ===
The Niʻihau incident occurred on December 7–13, 1941, just after the bombing of Pearl Harbor. Niihau is a Hawaiian island designated by the Imperial Japanese Navy as a place for damaged aircraft to land because they believed it to be uninhabited. However, the native Niihauans, as well as the Robinson family, lived on the island, which was closed to outsiders. Pilot Shigenori Nishikaichi crash-landed there and was cared for by the residents. While he was on the island he shared details about the bombing of Pearl Harbor with the island residents. When they recognized the seriousness of the situation the authorities apprehended Nishikaichi. The pilot received assistance from residents of Japanese descent and overcame his captors. Nishikaichi obtained weapons and took several hostages. After some time he was killed by Niihauans Benehakaka Kanahele and his wife Kealoha Kanahele. This incident was used by authorities to show that Japanese-Americans can be a threat to the United States war effort.

=== Cryptography ===
David Lowman, an NSA operative, stated the potential that American code-breaking could be intercepted by Japanese-Americans who posed a “frightening specter of massive espionage nets." There was very little evidence that indicated the presence of a Japanese-American espionage system. No Japanese-American living in the United States was convicted of any serious espionage or sabotage during WWII. This did not stop the government from seeing citizens of Japanese descent as a threat. Because of this Lowman decided that incarceration would ensure the secrecy of U.S. code-breaking efforts. The U.S. code-breaking efforts gave the U.S. a substantial tactical advantage over the Japanese Imperial Navy. If their efforts were compromised the Japanese Imperial Navy would change its codes stopping the U.S. from being able to intercept messages.

=== Nationalism and Racism ===
Japanese-Americans during World War 2

Some argue that Executive Order 9066 came from anti-immigration and nativist feelings which were common in the early 1900s. Nativism is “an attitude that favors people born within a country over its immigrant residents.” The Alien Registration act is evidence that Nationalism was already present before the attack on Pearl Harbor. This act required all aliens aged 14 and older to register with the government. This list was used to determine which Japanese Americans would be brought to Ellis Island.

== Ellis Island during World War II ==
During World War II, Ellis Island served many different purposes as immigration processing at Ellis Island declined by 97%. Besides continuing to serve as a deportation and detainment center, its facilities were used by the US military to help prisoners-of-war and enemies of the state. These enemies of the state include 7,000 people of Italian, German, and Japanese descent. It also served as a hospital for returning servicemen, a training ground for members of the US Coast Guard, and as a host for the crews of captured enemy ships.

== Japanese experience on Ellis Island ==
=== Internment ===
Before the December 7, 1941 attack on Pearl Harbor, the United States Justice Department had already made a plan to gather foreigners because of the tension surrounding World War 1. Evidence of this includes letters from the Attorney General's office with instructions to arrest 600 people from New York and 200 people from New Jersey every month and hold them at Ellis Island. The Federal Bureau of Investigation (FBI) and New York Police squads went all throughout New York, day and night, detaining Japanese New Yorkers. By the end of the day, about 100 Japanese Americans were arrested, almost all of them men. This process began the day after Pearl Harbor on December 8, 1941.

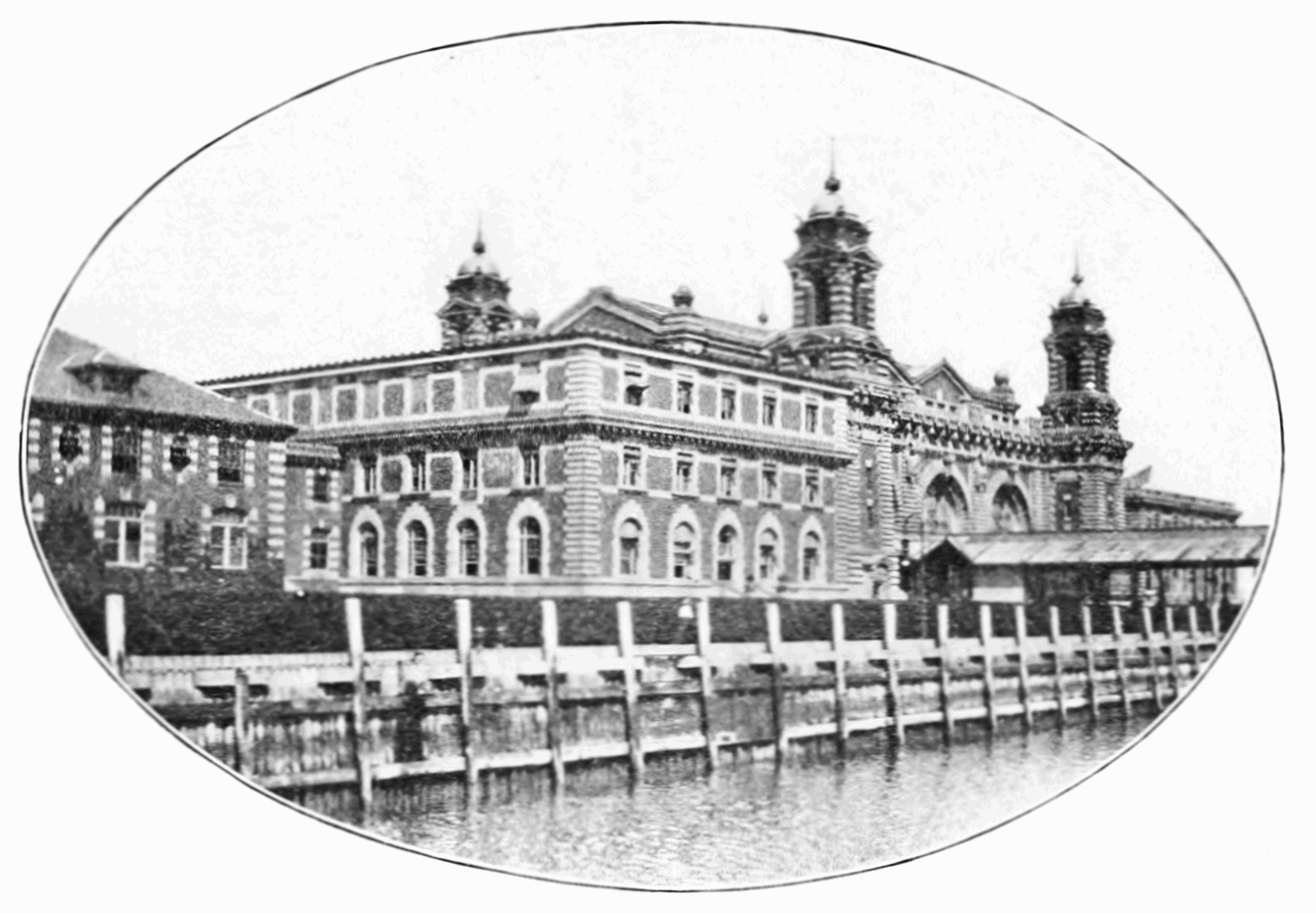
The Main Immigration Building at Ellis Island where Japanese-Americans stayed

Many of the people arrested were released or paroled after hearings directed by The Department of Justice. Others however were put in internment, often due to the hearings being before a local alien enemy hearing board. This was the case with many Japanese-American leaders who stayed on Ellis Island. Few of the people interned actually had pro-Axis sympathies, most were interned based on weak evidence or accusations that could not be proven.

=== Conditions ===
The length of Japanese-Americans' internment on Ellis Island differs. Some stayed up to two years, and others were quickly transferred to different detention centers. One Japanese-American, Naoye Suzuki, was suspected of being a spy. Suzuki was arrested and taken to Ellis Island for over a year. After learning that citizens could not be held as enemy aliens, Suzuki was able to argue for his freedom because he was born in the United States. The argument was successful and Suzuki left Ellis Island in the spring of 1943.

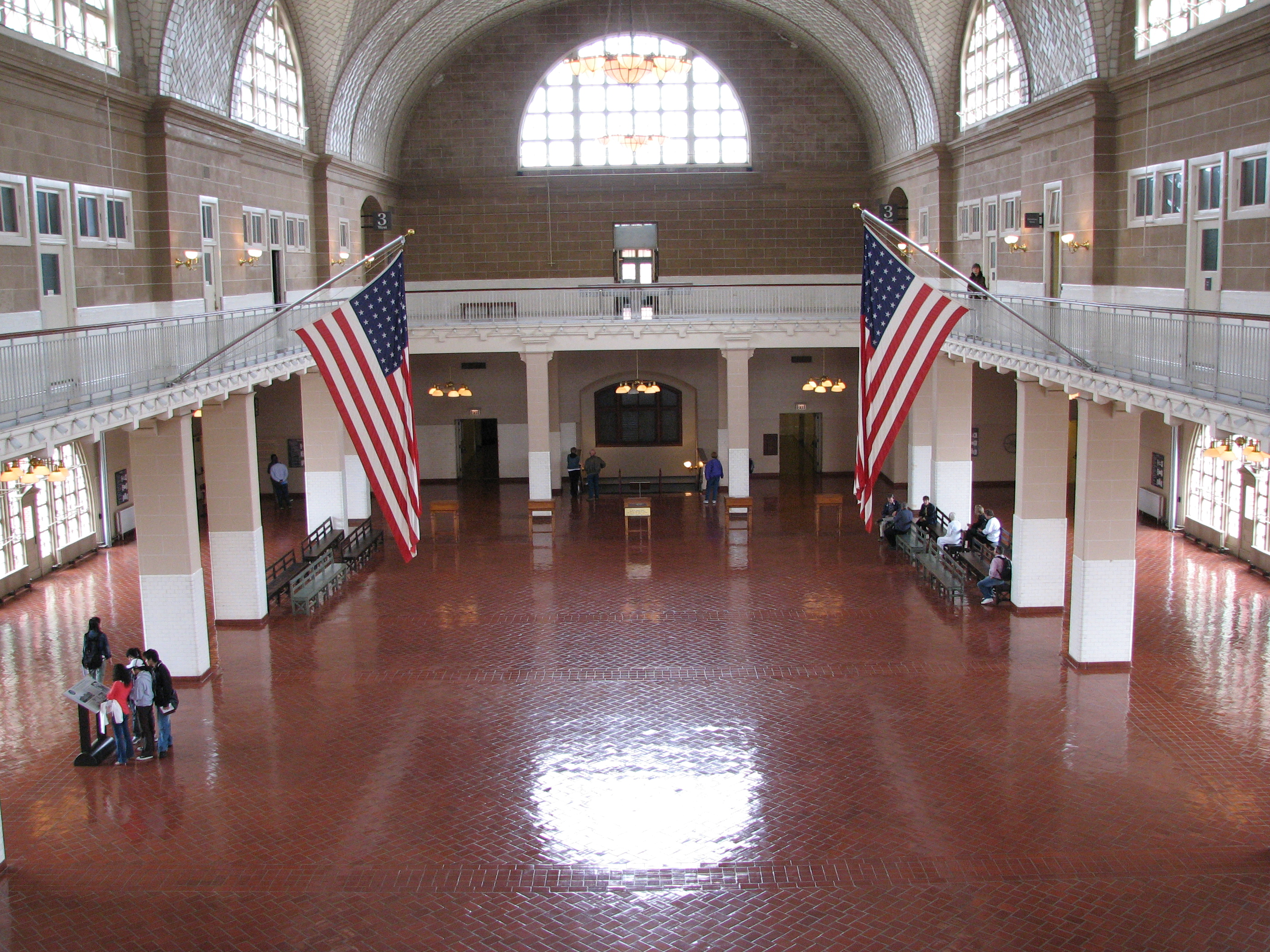
Ellis Island Registry Room

The long stay of many internees was difficult at Ellis Island since the facility had previously housed people only briefly. The inescapable island was seen as a perfect prison with its large dining rooms and satisfactory dormitories. Upon arrival, the enemy aliens stayed in the Main Immigration Building on Ellis Island. The Registry Room was used as family day quarters for Japanese-Americans as well as Italian and German enemy aliens. More space was created in 1943 when administrative workers at Ellis Island were able to move to an office in New York, freeing up living space for the people being held there. After being arrested and taken to Ellis Island, prisoners would be given a pair of American army shoes, khaki socks, shirt, and underwear. The conditions of the facility were described by some prisoners as, "bad food, bad medical care, overcrowding, lack of exercise and unhealthy conditions, including rats and urine-soaked mattresses." The Japanese-American internees also appear to have eaten in the same room as the Italian and German enemy aliens.

=== After the war ===
The internment of Japanese enemy aliens at Ellis Island marked a shift in how people thought about Ellis Island. The New York Times reported that “the Island’s name had become a symbol for being unwanted by America.” 1945 brought the end of World War 2 and the camp at Ellis Island closed completely later that year. Some of the internees stayed between one and four months while others like Suzuki stayed for a year. In February 1944, only three Japanese-Americans were being held at Ellis Island and by June 1944, that number had dropped to one. The United States under President Jimmy Carter eventually apologized to Japanese-Americans for the internment. A study investigating the internment of Japanese-Americans reported that the act had not been necessary or justified militarily.
