= Kekaha, Hawaii =

Kekaha
- Census-designated place
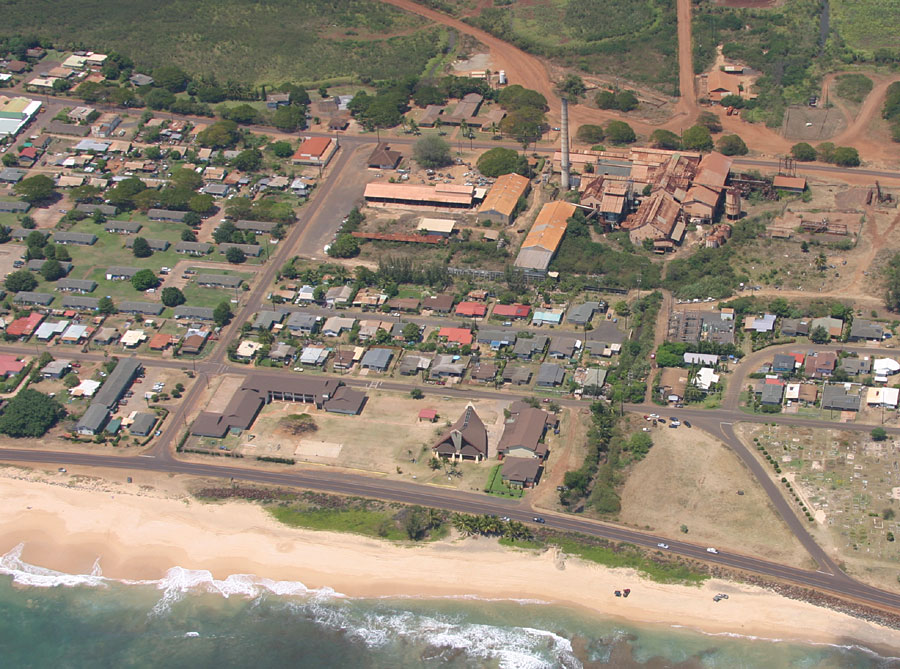
- Aerial view of Kekaha

- Location in Kauaʻi County and the state of Hawaii
- Coordinates: 21°58′18″N 159°42′59″W
- Country: United States
- State: Hawaii
- County: Kauaʻi

Area
  - Total: 1.29 sq mi (3.35 km^{2})
  - Land: 1.00 sq mi (2.60 km^{2})
  - Water: 0.29 sq mi (0.75 km^{2})
- Elevation: 9.8 ft (3 m)

Population (2020)
  - Total: 3,715
  - Density: 3,704.5/sq mi (1,430.32/km^{2})
- Time zone: UTC-10 (Hawaii-Aleutian)
- ZIP code: 96752
- Area code: 808
- FIPS code: 15-35600
- GNIS feature ID: 0361086

Kekaha (literally, "the place" in Hawaiian) is a census-designated place (CDP) in Kauaʻi County, Hawaiʻi, United States. The population was 3,715 at the 2020 census, up from 3,175 at the 2000 census.

== History ==
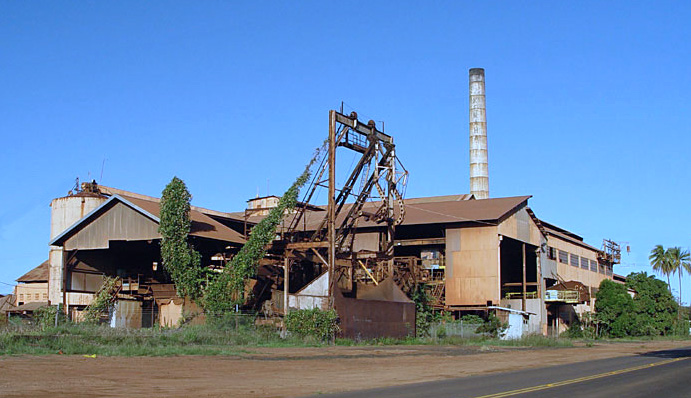
Kekaha Sugar Mill

By 1884 a sugar mill (later the Kekaha Sugar Mill) was operating within Kekaha. The mill was jointly owned by Otto Isenberg, Carl Isenberg, Paul Isenberg, Albert Wilcox, G. N. Wilcox, and S. M. Wilcox. By 1898, the Kekaha Sugar Mill Company was merged with other local interests to form the Kekaha Sugar Company.

The sugar mill had a major influence in Kekaha's development, including banking, employment, transportation, housing and utilities such as water and electricity. The mill employed several generations of local families. It closed in 2000 when the entire sugar industry in Hawaiʻi collapsed. The mill was purchased in 2005 by mainland investors who sold off its heavy machinery to other mills as far away as Africa.

Hawaiʻi's first (and only) train robbery occurred here in February 1920, when a masked gunman stopped a slow-moving sugar train and escaped with the locomotive and $11,000 (~$176,786 in 2025) taken from the labor paymaster on board. Police recovered the money in a swamp near the home of a local fisherman, whose suspicious behavior soon resulted in his arrest and conviction. The fisherman was a big fan of Western movies, and was thought to have been inspired by some of the films he had seen.

Circa 1962, the Army Radio Station a few miles west of Kekaha provided ionospheric and tropospheric scatter communications as part of a line of stations from California to Vietnam, sending TTY (Teleprinter) traffic back and forth during the Vietnam War. The radio station was shut down 1967.

== Geography ==
Kekaha is located on the southwest side of the island of Kauaʻi at 21°58′18″N 159°42′59″W (21.971690, -159.716290). It is bordered to the east by Waimea and to the south by the Pacific Ocean. Hawaii Route 50 passes through the community, leading northwest 7 miles (11 km) to its end at the Pacific Missile Range Facility and east 15 miles (24 km) to Kalaheo.

According to the United States Census Bureau, the Kekaha CDP has a total area of 1.3 square miles (3.4 km^{2}), of which 1.0 square mile (2.6 km^{2}) is land and 0.31 square miles (0.8 km^{2}), or 22.48%, are water.

=== Climate ===
According to data from a weather station affiliated with the Pacific Missile Range Facility 7 miles (11 km) from town, Kekaha has the climate type of the hot semi-arid climate (Köppen: BSh). The annual precipitation is 17.84 inches (453 mm), of which summer is the dry season and winter is the rainy season. December is the wettest month, while August is the driest.

Climate data for Pacific Missile Range Facility, 1991–2020 normals, extremes 1949–2015
Month	Jan	Feb	Mar	Apr	May	Jun	Jul	Aug	Sep	Oct	Nov	Dec	Year
Record high °F (°C)	86 (30)	87 (31)	87 (31)	90 (32)	90 (32)	93 (34)	93 (34)	93 (34)	93 (34)	92 (33)	90 (32)	88 (31)	93 (34)
Mean maximum °F (°C)	83.1 (28.4)	83.1 (28.4)	84.7 (29.3)	85.7 (29.8)	86.7 (30.4)	88.1 (31.2)	90.0 (32.2)	90.2 (32.3)	89.6 (32.0)	89.2 (31.8)	87.0 (30.6)	85.3 (29.6)	91.1 (32.8)
Mean daily maximum °F (°C)	79.1 (26.2)	79.2 (26.2)	80.5 (26.9)	82.2 (27.9)	83.6 (28.7)	85.7 (29.8)	86.5 (30.3)	87.5 (30.8)	87.2 (30.7)	86.0 (30.0)	83.5 (28.6)	81.6 (27.6)	83.5 (28.6)
Daily mean °F (°C)	72.0 (22.2)	71.8 (22.1)	73.0 (22.8)	74.4 (23.6)	76.1 (24.5)	78.1 (25.6)	78.9 (26.1)	80.1 (26.7)	79.7 (26.5)	78.6 (25.9)	76.1 (24.5)	74.3 (23.5)	76.1 (24.5)
Mean daily minimum °F (°C)	64.9 (18.3)	64.4 (18.0)	65.5 (18.6)	66.6 (19.2)	68.6 (20.3)	70.5 (21.4)	71.2 (21.8)	72.7 (22.6)	72.2 (22.3)	71.2 (21.8)	68.7 (20.4)	67.0 (19.4)	68.6 (20.3)
Mean minimum °F (°C)	58.3 (14.6)	58.2 (14.6)	59.7 (15.4)	61.4 (16.3)	63.8 (17.7)	66.7 (19.3)	67.8 (19.9)	69.2 (20.7)	68.4 (20.2)	66.9 (19.4)	63.9 (17.7)	60.9 (16.1)	57.0 (13.9)
Record low °F (°C)	54 (12)	54 (12)	55 (13)	57 (14)	59 (15)	63 (17)	64 (18)	65 (18)	64 (18)	58 (14)	57 (14)	53 (12)	53 (12)
Average precipitation inches (mm)	1.92 (49)	2.64 (67)	1.66 (42)	0.60 (15)	1.19 (30)	0.60 (15)	0.29 (7.4)	0.27 (6.9)	0.78 (20)	1.82 (46)	2.62 (67)	3.45 (88)	17.84 (453)
Average precipitation days (≥ 0.01 inch)	7.8	5.7	6.3	6.2	4.7	4.2	3.6	3.2	5.6	6.5	5.7	7.3	66.8
Source: NOAA (mean maxima/minima 1981–2010)

== Demographics ==
Historical population
Census	Pop.	Note	%±
2000	3,175		—
2020	3,715		—
U.S. Decennial Census

=== 2020 census ===
As of the 2020 census, Kekaha had a population of 3,715. The median age was 41.8 years. 22.9% of residents were under the age of 18 and 21.5% of residents were 65 years of age or older. For every 100 females there were 98.2 males, and for every 100 females age 18 and over there were 100.1 males age 18 and over.

100.0% of residents lived in urban areas, while 0.0% lived in rural areas.

There were 1,181 households in Kekaha, of which 34.5% had children under the age of 18 living in them. Of all households, 50.2% were married-couple households, 18.6% were households with a male householder and no spouse or partner present, and 24.0% were households with a female householder and no spouse or partner present. About 19.1% of all households were made up of individuals and 10.0% had someone living alone who was 65 years of age or older.

There were 1,343 housing units, of which 12.1% were vacant. The homeowner vacancy rate was 1.2% and the rental vacancy rate was 6.5%.

Racial composition as of the 2020 census
Race	Number	Percent
White	638	17.2%
Black or African American	8	0.2%
American Indian and Alaska Native	11	0.3%
Asian	1,136	30.6%
Native Hawaiian and Other Pacific Islander	598	16.1%
Some other race	41	1.1%
Two or more races	1,283	34.5%
Hispanic or Latino (of any race)	400	10.8%

=== 2000 census ===
As of the census of 2000, there were 3,175 people, 1,073 households, and 799 families residing in the CDP. The population density was 3,178.2 inhabitants per square mile (1,227.1/km^{2}). There were 1,162 housing units at an average density of 1,163.2 units per square mile (449.1 units/km^{2}). The racial makeup of the CDP was 15.9% White, 0.2% African American, 0.5% Native American, 43.6% Asian, 12.4% Pacific Islander, 1.0% from other races, and 26.4% from two or more races. Hispanic or Latino of any race were 8.7% of the population.

There were 1,073 households, out of which 30.4% had children under the age of 18 living with them, 55.9% were married couples living together, 13.1% had a female householder with no husband present, and 25.5% were non-families. 21.4% of all households were made up of individuals, and 9.4% had someone living alone who was 65 years of age or older. The average household size was 2.96 and the average family size was 3.44.

In the CDP the population was spread out, with 25.1% under the age of 18, 7.5% from 18 to 24, 24.4% from 25 to 44, 27.4% from 45 to 64, and 15.6% who were 65 years of age or older. The median age was 40 years. For every 100 females, there were 98.1 males. For every 100 females age 18 and over, there were 96.2 males.

The median income for a household in the CDP was $41,103, and the median income for a family was $48,629. Males had a median income of $32,969 versus $26,739 for females. The per capita income for the CDP was $17,117. About 10.9% of families and 11.2% of the population were below the poverty line, including 11.8% of those under age 18 and 11.1% of those age 65 or over.

== Items of interest ==
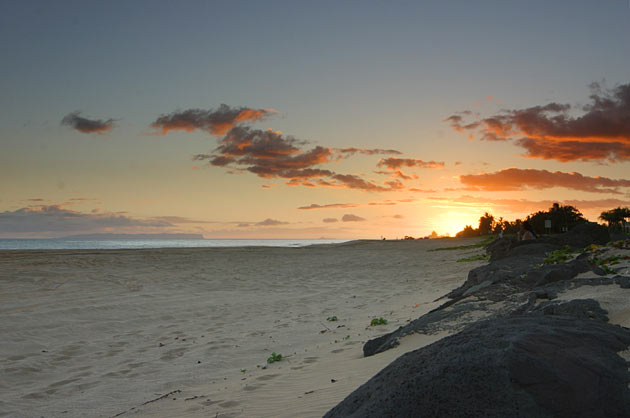
Kekaha Beach at sunset

Located near Kekaha is the U.S. Navy Pacific Missile Range Facility (PMRF). Within PMRF's property is located WWVH, the U.S.'s Pacific-region shortwave station operated by NIST broadcasting time signals from an atomic clock. The station also broadcasts weather alerts for portions of the Pacific Ocean. Kekaha Beach Park offers direct views of Niʻihau.

== Education ==
Hawaii Department of Education operates public schools, including:

- Kekaha Elementary School

Niihau School of Kekaha is a charter K-12 school in Kekaha.
