= Kaumakani, Hawaii =

Kaumakani
- Census-designated place
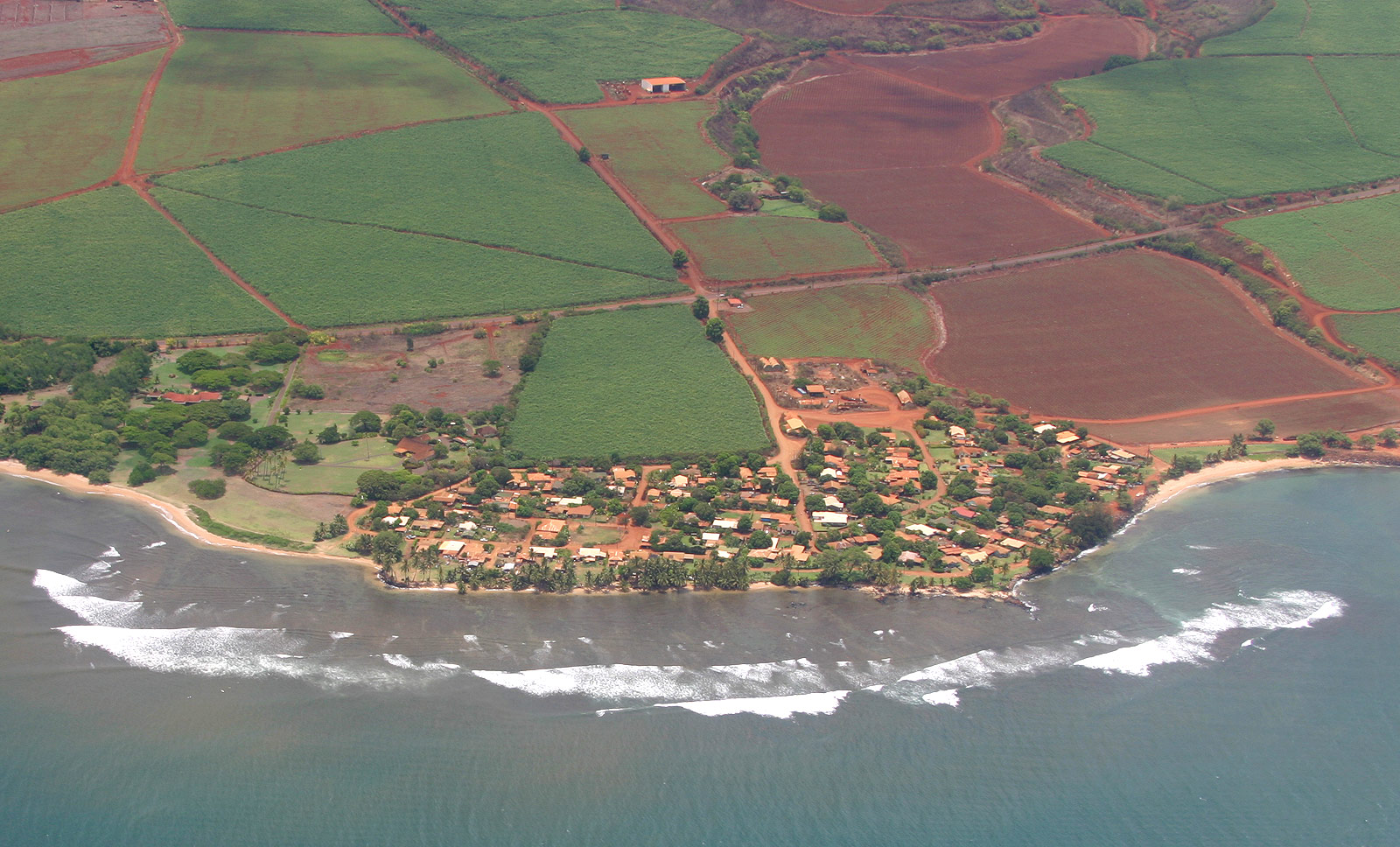
- 2004 aerial view of Pakala Village

- Location in Kauaʻi County and the state of Hawaii
- Coordinates: 21°55′13″N 159°37′27″W
- Country: United States
- State: Hawaii
- County: Kauaʻi

Area
  - Total: 1.06 sq mi (2.74 km^{2})
  - Land: 0.95 sq mi (2.46 km^{2})
  - Water: 0.11 sq mi (0.29 km^{2})
- Elevation: 151 ft (46 m)

Population (2020)
  - Total: 672
  - Density: 708.3/sq mi (273.47/km^{2})
- Time zone: UTC-10 (Hawaii-Aleutian)
- ZIP code: 96747; 96769
- Area code: 808
- FIPS code: 15-30650
- GNIS feature ID: 0360693

Kaumakani (literally, "place in the wind" in the Hawaiian language) is a census-designated place (CDP) in Kauaʻi County, Hawaiʻi, United States. As of the 2020 census, Kaumakani had a population of 672.

== History ==
Kaumakani was officially known as "Makaweli" (which means "fearful features" in the Hawaiian language) for over forty years; Makaweli was an ancient land division (ahupuaʻa). In 1914, the Board on Geographic Names ruled that the community was to be named Makaweli, and in 1956 officially renamed the community Kaumakani. Its post office is designated "Kaumakani" and uses the ZIP code 96747. The post office is only open in the mornings.

In 2008, a small settlement to the west at 21°55′59″N 159°38′51″W known as Pākalā Village was designated its own CDP. Pākalā Village has its own post office named "Makaweli" with ZIP code 96769, open only in afternoons. Makaweli Landing at Pākala was called "Robinson's Landing", since the family of Aubrey Robinson ran a private ferry to their island of Niʻihau. Pākalā means "the sun shines" in Hawaiian.

== Geography ==
Kaumakani is located on the southern shore of Kauaʻi island at 21°55′13″N 159°37′27″W (21.920292, -159.624281). The main road is Kaumualiʻi Highway, Route 50.

According to the United States Census Bureau, the Kaumakani CDP has a total area of 1.06 square miles (2.74 km^{2}), of which 0.95 square miles (2.46 km^{2}) are land and 0.11 square miles (0.29 km^{2}), or 10.46%, are water.

=== Climate ===
Climate data for Kaumakani, Hawaii, 1991–2020 normals, extremes 1905–present
Month	Jan	Feb	Mar	Apr	May	Jun	Jul	Aug	Sep	Oct	Nov	Dec	Year
Record high °F (°C)	88 (31)	91 (33)	89 (32)	91 (33)	91 (33)	94 (34)	92 (33)	95 (35)	93 (34)	92 (33)	90 (32)	90 (32)	95 (35)
Mean maximum °F (°C)	82.9 (28.3)	83.0 (28.3)	84.0 (28.9)	84.8 (29.3)	86.8 (30.4)	88.3 (31.3)	89.3 (31.8)	90.4 (32.4)	89.8 (32.1)	88.6 (31.4)	86.3 (30.2)	84.1 (28.9)	90.7 (32.6)
Mean daily maximum °F (°C)	79.9 (26.6)	79.6 (26.4)	80.1 (26.7)	81.3 (27.4)	83.0 (28.3)	85.4 (29.7)	86.2 (30.1)	87.3 (30.7)	86.9 (30.5)	85.7 (29.8)	83.0 (28.3)	81.1 (27.3)	83.3 (28.5)
Daily mean °F (°C)	72.1 (22.3)	72.1 (22.3)	72.6 (22.6)	74.2 (23.4)	75.9 (24.4)	78.2 (25.7)	79.3 (26.3)	79.9 (26.6)	79.6 (26.4)	78.6 (25.9)	75.8 (24.3)	73.9 (23.3)	76.0 (24.4)
Mean daily minimum °F (°C)	64.2 (17.9)	64.5 (18.1)	65.0 (18.3)	67.1 (19.5)	68.8 (20.4)	70.9 (21.6)	72.3 (22.4)	72.4 (22.4)	72.3 (22.4)	71.4 (21.9)	68.6 (20.3)	66.6 (19.2)	68.7 (20.4)
Mean minimum °F (°C)	59.1 (15.1)	58.3 (14.6)	59.3 (15.2)	61.8 (16.6)	62.8 (17.1)	67.0 (19.4)	67.6 (19.8)	68.6 (20.3)	68.9 (20.5)	67.0 (19.4)	63.7 (17.6)	62.6 (17.0)	55.7 (13.2)
Record low °F (°C)	50 (10)	50 (10)	50 (10)	54 (12)	53 (12)	56 (13)	58 (14)	58 (14)	57 (14)	58 (14)	55 (13)	54 (12)	50 (10)
Average precipitation inches (mm)	2.12 (54)	2.40 (61)	3.86 (98)	1.32 (34)	1.37 (35)	0.60 (15)	0.73 (19)	0.72 (18)	1.16 (29)	2.86 (73)	2.09 (53)	4.17 (106)	23.40 (594)
Average precipitation days (≥ 0.01 in)	9.1	8.6	8.1	7.9	6.7	8.7	6.8	6.5	8.5	9.1	8.8	9.4	98.2
Source: NOAA

== Demographics ==
Historical population
Census	Pop.	Note	%±
2020	672		—
U.S. Decennial Census

As of the census of 2000, there were 607 people, 207 households, and 162 families residing in the CDP. The population density was 635.7 inhabitants per square mile (245.4/km^{2}). There were 234 housing units at an average density of 245.1 per square mile (94.6/km^{2}). The racial makeup of the CDP was 4% White, 77% Asian, 2% Pacific Islander, <1% from other races, and 16% from two or more races. Hispanic or Latino of any race were 5% of the population.

There were 207 households, out of which 33% had children under the age of 18 living with them, 60% were married couples living together, 9% had a female householder with no husband present, and 21% were non-families. 18% of all households were made up of individuals, and 9% had someone living alone who was 65 years of age or older. The average household size was 2.93 and the average family size was 3.34.

In the CDP the population was spread out, with 26% under the age of 18, 6% from 18 to 24, 28% from 25 to 44, 20% from 45 to 64, and 20% who were 65 years of age or older. The median age was 40 years. For every 100 females, there were 104.4 males. For every 100 females age 18 and over, there were 102.7 males.

The median income for a household in the CDP was $34,583, and the median income for a family was $41,250. Males had a median income of $26,429 versus $23,654 for females. The per capita income for the CDP was $14,024. About 9% of families and 11% of the population were below the poverty line, including 11% of those under age 18 and 8% of those age 65 or over.
