= Isabella McHutcheson Sinclair =

Scottish-born Hawaiian botanist (1842–1900)

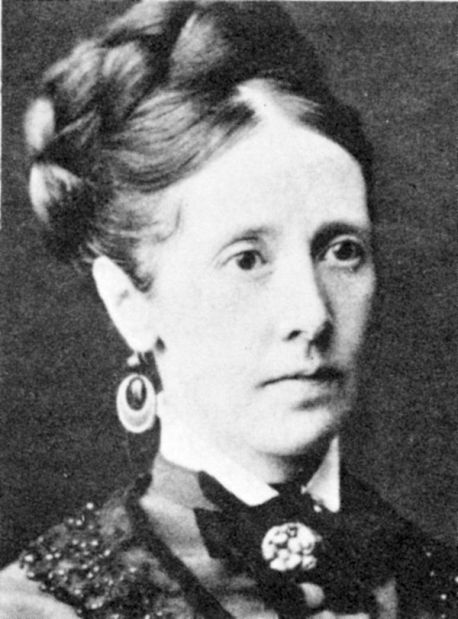
- Born: Isabella McHutcheson; 1842; Stirling, Scotland, U.K.
- Died: 29 December 1900 (aged 57–58); San Jose, California, U.S.
- Known for: Botany, Scientific illustration, Botanical illustration
- Notable work: Indigenous flowers of the Hawaiian islands (1885)
- Spouse: Francis Sinclair Jr.

Isabella McHutcheson Sinclair (1842 – 29 December 1900) was a Scottish born botanist, author and botanical illustrator. Her best known work is the 1885 book Indigenous flowers of the Hawaiian islands, the first book published with colour images of Hawaiian flowering plants.

== Biography ==
Sinclair was born Isabella McHutcheson in 1840 near Stirling, Scotland. She is believed to be a daughter of Isabella (Phelps) McHutcheson and her husband William McHutcheson, who was a brother of Elizabeth McHutcheson Sinclair. She emigrated to New Zealand with her family as a young child. On 7 August 1866, Isabella McHutcheson of Blenheim, Marlborough, New Zealand married her cousin, Francis Sinclair, Jr. After marriage to her husband Francis, Sinclair moved with his family to Hawai'i. Her aunt and mother-in-law, Elizabeth Sinclair, was a farmer and plantation owner in New Zealand and Hawaii, best known as the matriarch of the Sinclair family that bought the Hawaiian island of Niʻihau in 1864 from King Kamehameha V for the sum of $10,000 in gold.

== Works ==
In Hawaii, Sinclair produced her most notable work Indigenous flowers of the Hawaiian islands. This was the first book published with colour images of Hawaiian flowering plants.

After her marriage, Sinclair lived with her husband in Kiekie on the island of Nii'hau and later in Makaweli on the island of Kauai. She explored Niihau, Waimea Valley, Olokele Valley, Kokeʻe and other locations, painting the native flora there and researching information about those species from Native Hawaiians. She collected specimens of each native flowering plant and illustrated each one, creating a portfolio of 44 full-page color plates. She sent the specimens to Joseph Dalton Hooker, then director of the Royal Botanical Gardens at Kew, England, for scientific identification. Dr. Hooker provided her with each flower's botanical name, which she documented along with the Hawaiian names, natural habitats and blossoming seasons of each species.

In 1885, with the encouragement of Hooker, Sinclair published Indigenous Flowers of the Hawaiian Islands. She dedicated the volume: “To the Hawaiian Chiefs and People who have been most appreciative friends, and most lenient critics, this work is affectionately inscribed.”

Isabella was among the first authors to express concern about the loss of native habitats on Hawaiian flora due to land development and competition from invasive species:

"The Hawaiian flora seems to grow in an easy, careless way," she wrote, "which, though pleasingly artistic, and well adapted to what may be termed the natural state of the islands, will not long survive the invasions of foreign plants and changed conditions. Forest fires, animals and agriculture, have so changed the islands, within the last fifty or sixty years, that one can now travel for miles . . . without finding a single indigenous plant; the ground being wholly taken possession of by weeds, shrubs and grasses, imported from various countries."

== Publications ==
The standard author abbreviation I.Sinclair is used to indicate this person as the author when citing a botanical name.

- Indigenous flowers of the Hawaiian islands by Mrs Francis Sinclair Jr. (London, Sampson Low, Marston, Searle, and Rivington., 1885)
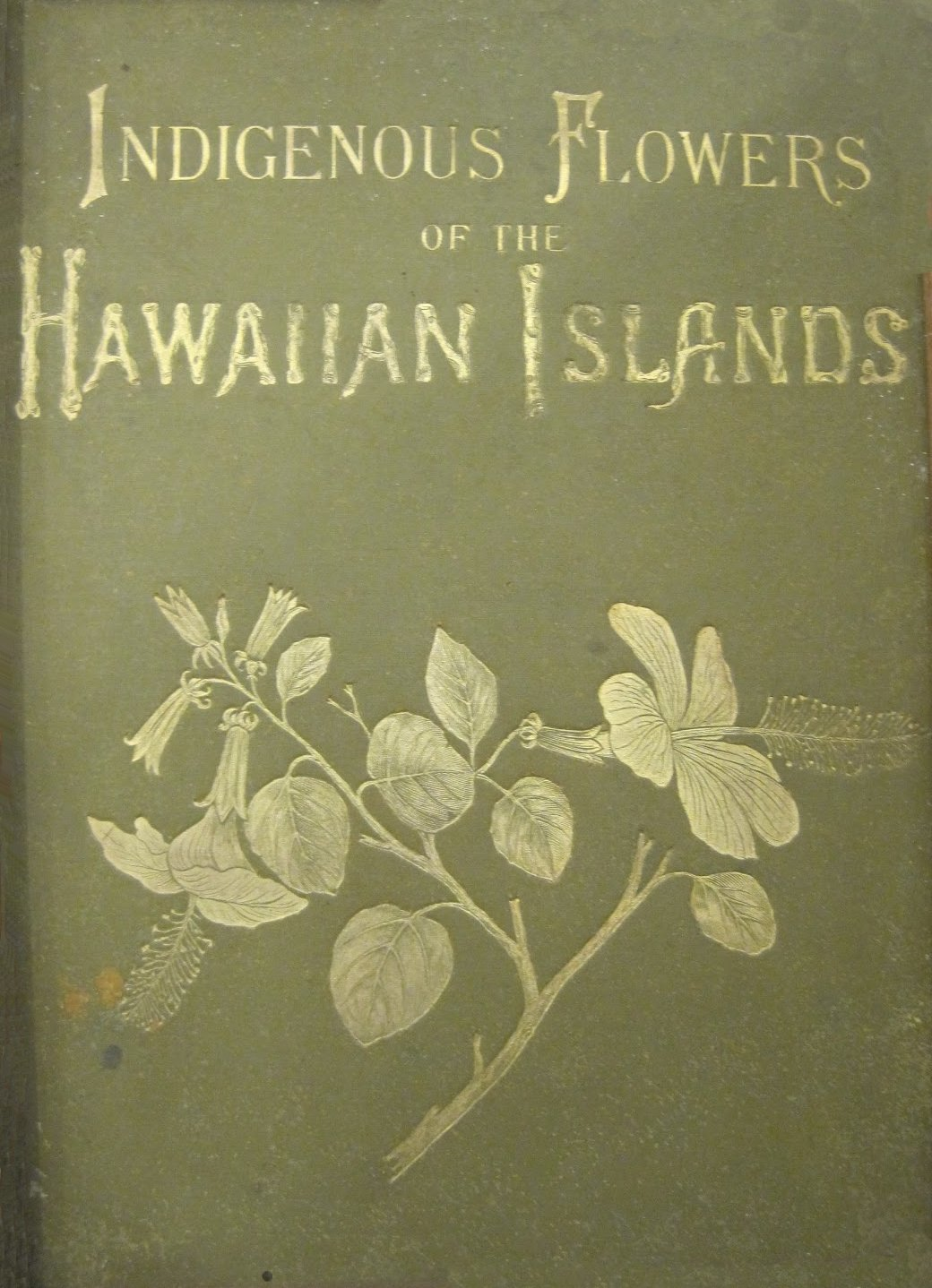
Indigenous Flowers of the Hawaiian Islands, Mrs. Frances Sinclair, cover

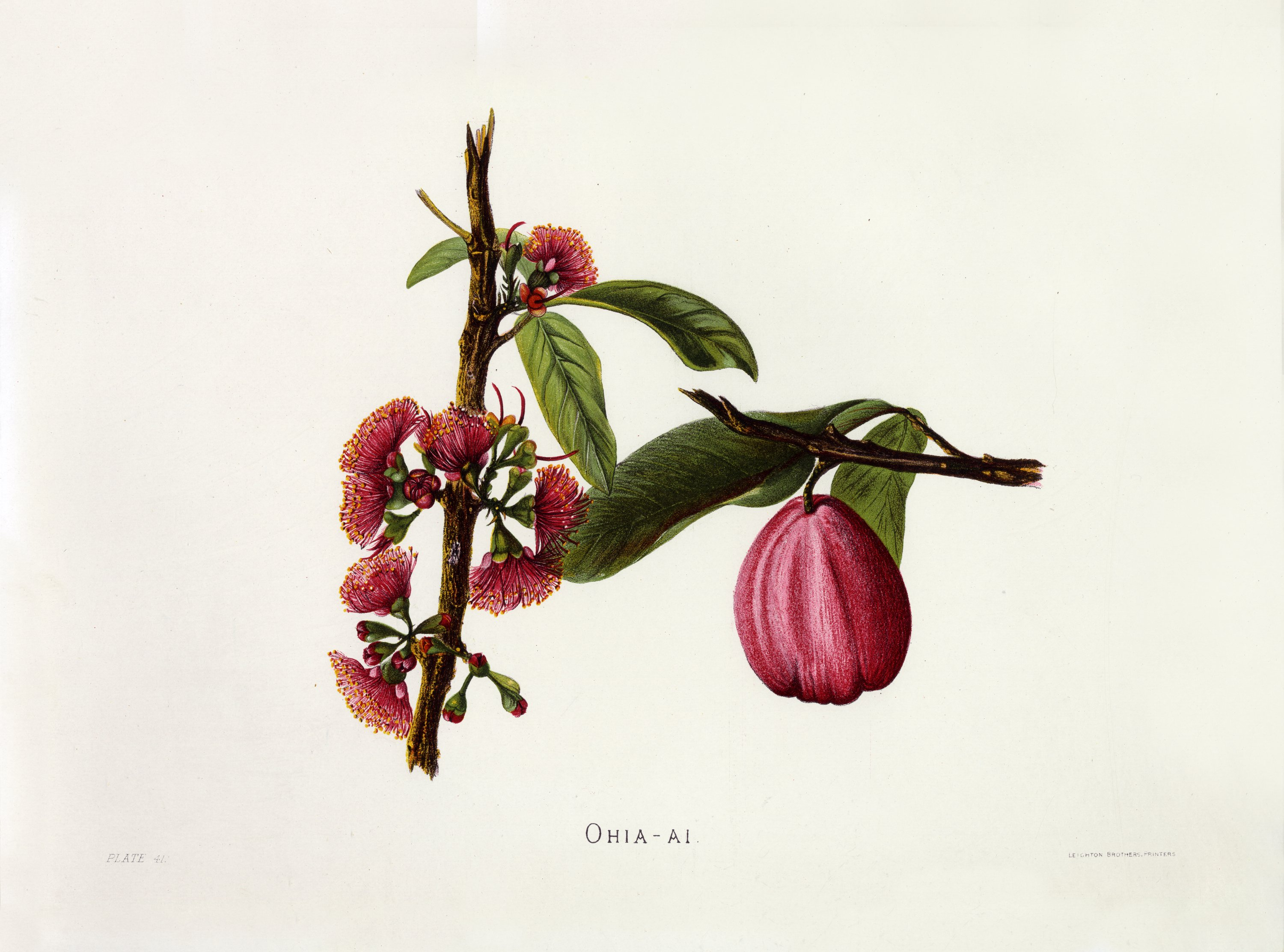
Indigenous Flowers of the Hawaiian Islands, Plate 41

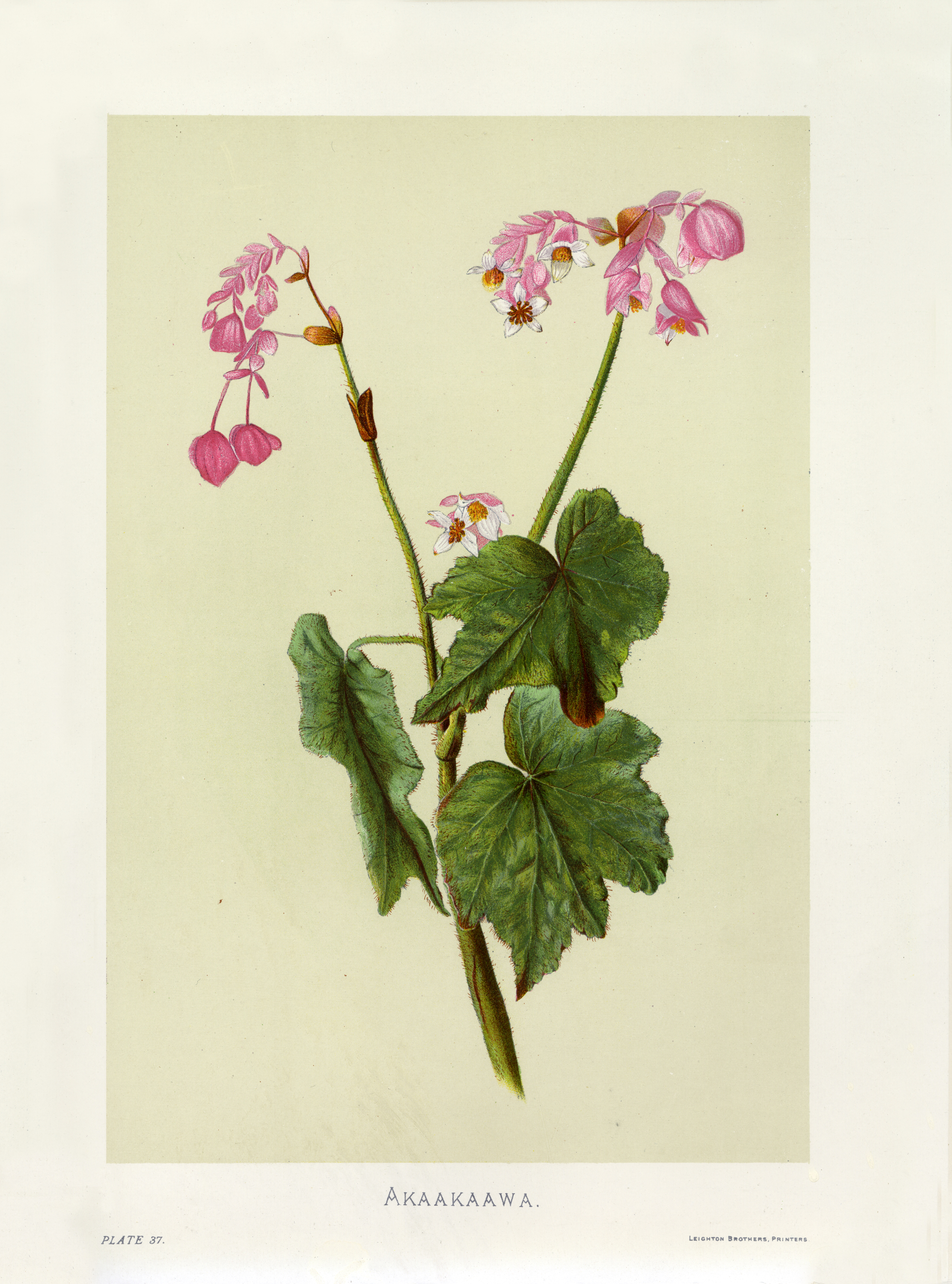
Indigenous Flowers of the Hawaiian Islands, Plate 37

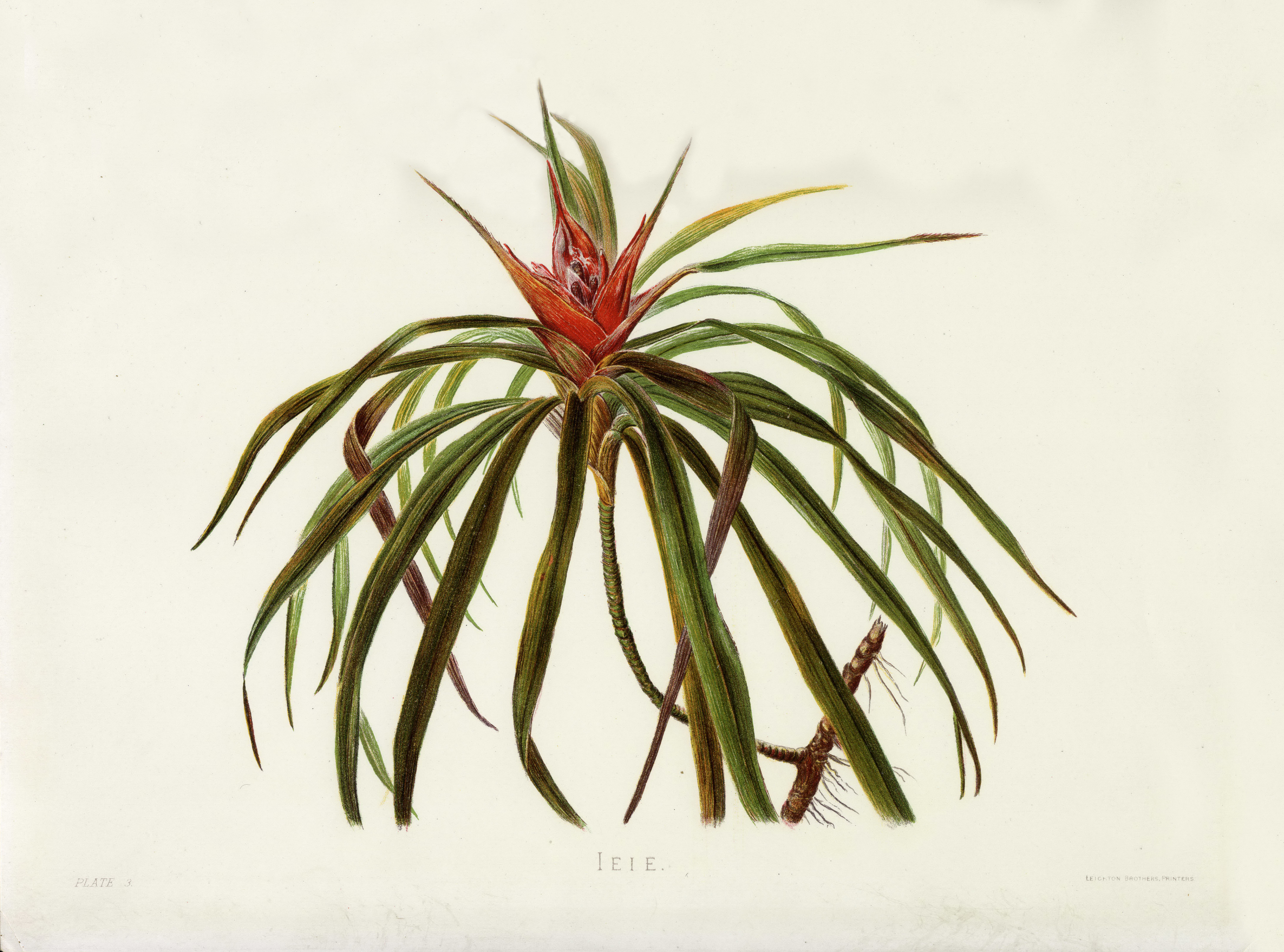
Indigenous Flowers of the Hawaiian Islands, Plate 3

== Family ties ==
Isabella's father William McHutcheson eventually moved to Oamaru, New Zealand. Isabella's brother, also named William McHutcheson, likely visited his sister during an extensive six-months tour in 1886 that included Hawaii, North America, England, and Scotland. He described his travels in The New Zealander Abroad (1888). He also wrote a serialized account of colonial life, "The New Zealander at Home" (1890), and published Camp-life in Fiordland, New Zealand (1892).

At some point, Isabella and her husband went to California. Isabella died in San Jose, California, on 29 December 1890 and was buried at Trinity Church on 31 December 1890. Her name has been transcribed from their records as "Sinclaire (Mrs.) Frances"

In 1902, Francis Sinclair returned to New Zealand and married Isabella's widowed sister, Williamina Shirriffs. He had no issue from either marriage. Francis spent much of the rest of his life in England, published several books of poetry and essays, and died on 22 July 1916 on the Island of Jersey.
