= Kanakanavu =

Kanakanavu can refer to:

- the Kanakanavu people
- the Kanakanavu language
