= Namasia District =

Mountain indigenous district in Kaohsiung, Taiwan

Namasia 那瑪夏區
- Mountain Indigenous District
- Namasia District
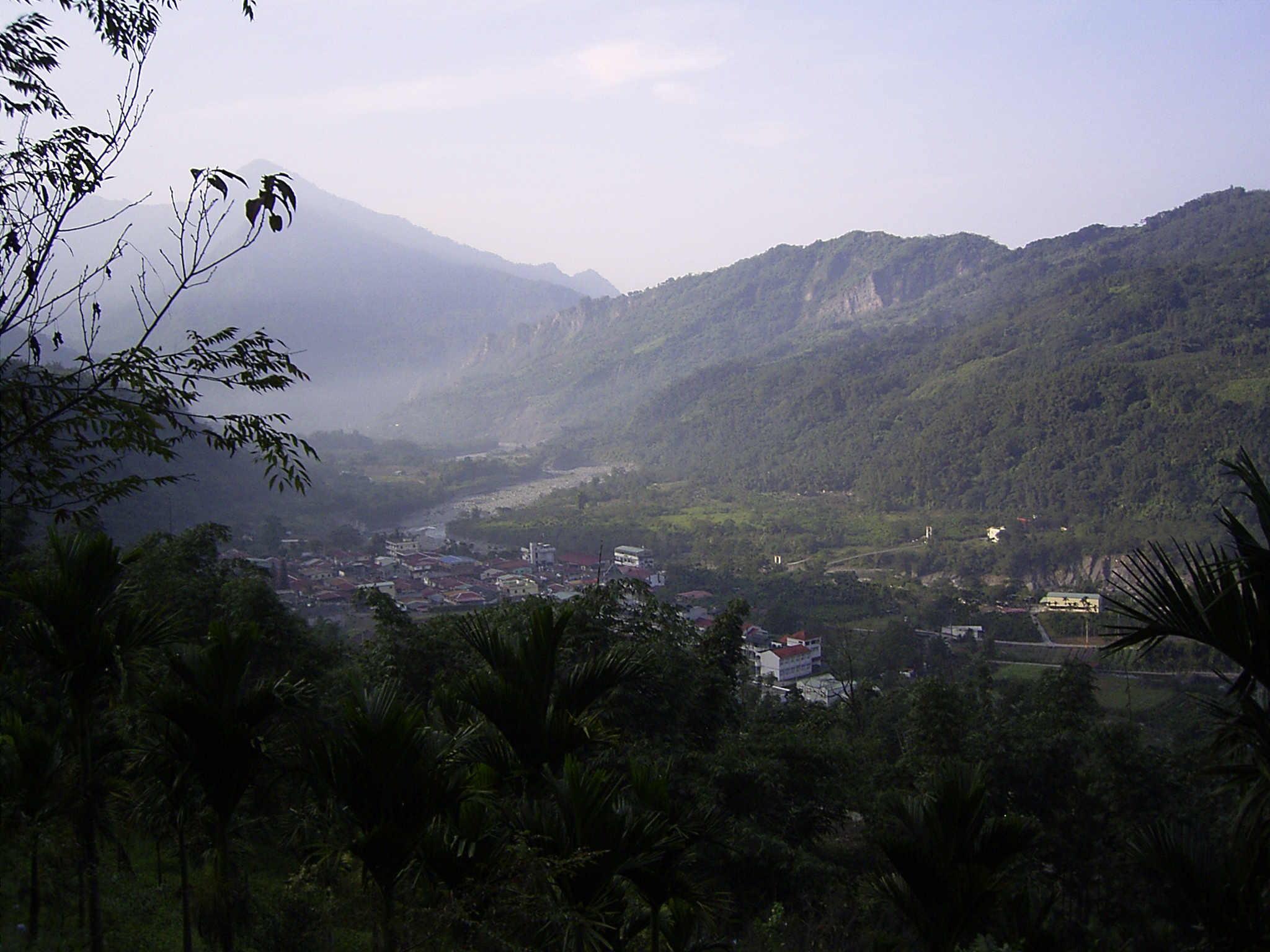
- Maya Village

- 高雄市那瑪夏區公所; Namasia District Office, Kaohsiung City

- Namasia District in Kaohsiung City
- Coordinates: 23.271627°N 120.725906°E
- Country: Taiwan
- Municipality: Kaohsiung City
- Boroughs: List: 3 villages

Government
  - Type: District government
  - District chief: Payan Islituan (Ind.)

Population (October 2023)
  - Total: 3,165
- Website: namasia-en.kcg.gov.tw

Namasia District (Kanakanavu language, Bunun language: Namasia; Chinese: 那瑪夏區; Hanyu Pinyin: Nàmǎxià Qū; Tongyong Pinyin: Nàmǎsià Cyu; Wade–Giles: Na^{4}-ma^{3}-hsia^{4} Ch'ü^{1}), formerly Sanmin Township (三民鄉; Sānmín Xiāng), is a mountain indigenous district located in the northeastern part of Kaohsiung, Taiwan. It is the second largest district in Kaohsiung after Taoyuan District.

The population of the township is mainly the indigenous Bunun, Kanakanavu and Saaroa peoples. The modern-day population of the Kanakanavu people live in the two villages of Manga and Takanua.

== Name ==
On 1 January 2008, the then-township (which then was a part of Kaohsiung County) was renamed from Sanmin to Namasia, as the name of Sanmin (taken from the Sun Yat-sen's Three Principles of the People), was considered an overly political name. Rather, the name Namasia was chosen, as it is the name of a local river in the Tsou language, while its meaning is "better and better" in the Bunun language.

== History ==
During the period of Japanese rule, Namasia was grouped with Maolin District and Taoyuan District and classified as "Aboriginal Areas" (蕃地), which was governed under Kizan District of Takao Prefecture.

== Geography ==
The lowest point in the Qishan River valley is 430 meters above sea level; the highest is the peak of Mount Xinwangling (新望嶺), at 2,481 meters. The four main settlements upriver are Nangisalu (南沙魯), Maya (瑪雅), and Takanua (達卡努瓦) 1 & 2.

There is plentiful wildlife: 29 mammal species, 97 bird species, 30 types of reptile, 16 amphibians, and 18 fishes. There are also 89 butterfly species.

== Administrative divisions ==
Namasia District is divided into three villages:

- Nangisalu Village (南沙魯里)
- Maya(Mangacun) Village (瑪雅里)
- Takanua(Tangaanua) Village (達卡努瓦里)

Namasia District administrative divisions

== Politics ==
On 29 November 2014, Dahu Istanda of Taiwan First Nations Party was elected the first ever District Magistrate of Namasia. On 24 November 2018, Payan Islituan was elected the District Magistrate of Namasia.

== See also ==
- Kaohsiung
