= Symmetrical voice =

Grammatical phenomenon in Austronesian

Symmetrical voice, also known as Austronesian alignment or the Austronesian focus system, is a typologically unusual kind of morphosyntactic alignment in which "one argument can be marked as having a special relationship to the verb". This special relationship manifests itself as a voice affix on the verb that corresponds to the syntactic role of a noun within the clause, that is either marked for a particular grammatical case or is found in a privileged structural position within the clause or both.

There are two alignment types of languages with symmetrical voice: the Philippine type, which mostly retains the original system from Proto-Austronesian with four voices (or sometimes three), and the Indonesian type, which reduced them into only two voices.

The Philippine-type languages include languages of the Philippines, but is also found in Taiwan's Formosan languages, as well as in northern Borneo, northern Sulawesi, and Madagascar, and has been reconstructed for the ancestral Proto-Austronesian language. In the rest of the Malayo-Polynesian languages, including Proto-Oceanic, symmetrical voice was lost almost entirely.

The number of voices differs from language to language. While the majority sampled have four voices, it is possible to have as few as two voices, and as many as six voices. In the examples below, the voice affix on the verb appears in red text, while the subject, which the affix selects, appears in underlined bold italics.

== Terminology ==
The term Austronesian focus was widely used in early literature, but more scholars turn to the term voice recently because of the arguments against the term 'focus'. On the other hand, Starosta argued that neither voice nor focus is correct and that it is a lexical derivation.

Schachter (1987) proposed the word 'trigger', which has seen widespread use. As one source summarized, 'focus' and 'topic' do not mean what they mean in discourse (the essential piece of new information, and what is being talked about, respectively), but rather 'focus' is a kind of agreement, and the 'topic' is a noun phrase that agrees with the focus-marked verb. Thus using those terms for Austronesian/Philippine alignment is "misleading" and "it seems better to refer to this argument expression as the trigger, a term that reflects the fact that the semantic role of the argument in question triggers the choice of a verbal affix."

== Studies ==
A number of studies focused on the typological perspective of Austronesian voice system. Some explored the semantic or pragmatic properties of Austronesian voice system. Others contributed to the valence-changing morphology.

== Properties ==
=== Agreement with the semantic role of the subject ===
In languages that exhibit symmetrical voice, the voice affix on the main verb within the clause marks agreement with "the semantic role of the [subject]".

For example, the Actor Voice affix may agree only with agent nominal phrases. (The asterisk means that the sentence is ungrammatical for the intended meaning.)

Kapampangan

S‹um›ulat ya=ng poesia ing lalaki king pisara.
‹AV›will.write 3SG.DIR=ACC poem DIR boy OBL blackboard
"The boy will write a poem on the blackboard."

* Sumulat yang lalaki ing poesia king pisara.
Intended: "The boy will write a poem on the blackboard."
(Grammatical for: "The poem will write a boy on the blackboard.")

* Sumulat yang poesia ing pisara king lalaki.
Intended: "The boy will write a poem on the blackboard."
(Grammatical for: "The blackboard will write a poem on the boy.")

Tagalog

B‹um›ilí ng manggá sa palengke ang lalaki.
‹ASP.AV›buy IND mango OBL market DIR man
"The man bought a mango at the market."

* Bumilí ng lalaki sa palengke ang manggá.
Intended: "The man bought a mango at the market."
(Grammatical for: "The mango bought a man at the market.")

* Bumilí ng manggá sa lalaki ang palengke.
Intended: "The man bought a mango at the market."
(Grammatical for: "The market bought a mango from the man.")

The sentences in (b) are ungrammatical because the patient nominal phrase is marked as the subject, even though the verb bears the Actor Voice infix. The sentences in (c) are ungrammatical because, instead of the agent nominal phrase, the location nominal phrase is marked as the subject.

The patient voice affix may agree only with patient nominal phrases.

Kapampangan

I-sulat n=e ning lalaki ing poesia king pisara.
PV-will.write 3SG.ERG=3SG.DIR ERG boy DIR poem OBL blackboard
"The poem will be written by the boy on the blackboard."

* Isulat ne ning poesia ing lalaki king pisara.
Intended: "The poem will be written by the boy on the blackboard."
(Grammatical for: "The boy will be written by the poem on the blackboard.")

* Isulat ne ning lalaki ing pisara king poesia.
Intended: "The poem will be written by the boy on the blackboard."
(Grammatical for: "The blackboard will be written by the boy on the poem.")

Tagalog

B‹in›ilí-∅ ng lalaki sa palengke ang manggá.
‹ASP›buy-PV IND man OBL market DIR mango
"The mango was bought by the man at the market."

* Binilí-∅ ng manggá sa palengke ang lalaki.
Intended: "The mango was bought by the man at the market."
(Grammatical for: "The man was bought by the mango at the market.")

* Binilí-∅ ng lalaki sa manggá ang palengke.
Intended: "The mango was bought by the man at the market."
(Grammatical for: "The market was bought by the man at the mango.")

The sentences in (b) are ungrammatical because the agent nominal phrase is marked as the subject, even though the verb bears the patient voice affix. The sentences in (c) are ungrammatical because, instead of the patient nominal phrase, the location nominal phrase is marked as the subject.

The locative voice affix may agree only with location nominal phrases.

Kapampangan

Pi-sulat-an n=e=ng poesia ning lalaki ing pisara.
LV-will.write-LV 3SG.ERG=3SG.DIR=ACC poem ERG boy DIR blackboard
"The blackboard will be written a poem on by the boy."

* Pisulatan neng poesia ning pisara ing lalaki.
Intended: "The blackboard will be written a poem on by the boy."
(Grammatical for: "The boy will be written a poem on by the blackboard.")

* Pisulatan neng pisara ning lalaki ing poesia.
Intended: "The blackboard will be written a poem on by the boy."
(Grammatical for: "The poem will be written a blackboard on by the boy.")

Tagalog

B‹in›ilh-án ng lalaki ng manggá ang palengke.
‹ASP›buy-LV IND man IND mango DIR market
"The market was bought a mango at by the man."

* Binilhán ng palengke ng manggá ang lalaki.
Intended: "The market was bought a mango at by the man."
(Grammatical for: "The man was bought a mango from by the market.")

* Binilhán ng lalaki ng palengke ang manggá.
Intended: "The market was bought a mango at by the man."
(Grammatical for: "The mango was bought a market at by the man.")

The sentences in (b) are ungrammatical because the agent nominal phrase is marked as the subject, even though the verb bears the locative voice affix. The sentences in (c) are ungrammatical because, instead of the location nominal phrase, the patient nominal phrase is marked as the subject.

=== Types of semantic roles ===
Across languages, the most common semantic roles with which the voice affixes may agree are agent, patient, location, instrument, and benefactee. In some languages, the voice affixes may also agree with semantic roles such as theme, goal, reason, and time. The set of semantic roles that may be borne by subjects in each language varies, and some affixes can agree with more than one semantic role.

=== Promotion direct to subject ===
Languages that have symmetrical voice do not have a process that promotes an oblique argument to direct object. Oblique arguments are promoted directly to subject.

Tagalog

{} agent {} theme {} goal {} {}
Nagpadalá ang mamà ng pera sa anák niyá.
M-n-pag-padalá {} {} {} {} {} {} {}
AV-ASP-¿?-send DIR man IND money OBL child 3SG.GEN
"The man sent money to his child."

{} agent {} theme {} goal {} {}
P‹in›adalh-án ng mamà ng pera ang anák niyá.
‹ASP›send-LV IND man IND money DIR child 3SG.GEN
"His_{i} child was sent money by the man_{i}."

{} {} agent {} theme {} goal {} {}
* Nagpadalhán ang mamà ng pera ng anák niyá.
{} M-n-pag-padalh-án {} {} {} {} {} {} {}
{} AV-ASP-¿?-send-LV DIR man IND money IND child 3SG.GEN
Intended: "The man sent his child money."

In the Tagalog examples above, the goal nominal phrase can either be an indirect object, as in (1), or a subject as in (2). However, it cannot become a direct object, or be marked with indirect case, as in (3). Verb forms, such as "nagpadalhan", which bear both an Actor Voice affix and a non-Actor Voice affix, do not exist in languages that have symmetrical voice.

The Tagalog examples contrast with the examples from Indonesian below.

Indonesian

agent {} theme goal {}
Ayah mengirim uang kepada saya.
{} meN-kirim {} {} {}
father {ACTIVE VOICE}-send money to 1SG
"Father sent money to me."

goal {} theme agent {}
Saya di-kirim-i uang oleh Ayah.
1SG {PASSIVE VOICE}-send-APPLICATIVE money by father
"I was sent money by Father."

agent {} goal theme
Ayah mengirimi saya uang.
{} meN-kirim-i {} {}
father {ACTIVE VOICE}-send-APPLICATIVE 1SG money
"Father sent me money."

In the Indonesian examples, the goal nominal phrase can be the indirect object, as in (4), and the subject, as in (5). However, unlike in Tagalog, the goal nominal phrase in Indonesian can be a direct object, as in (6). The preposition kepada disappears in the presence of the applicative suffix -i, and the goal nominal phrase moves from sentence-final position to some verb-adjacent position. In addition, they can behave like regular direct objects and undergo processes such as passivisation, as in (5).

== Proto-Austronesian examples ==
The examples below are in Proto-Austronesian. Asterisks indicate a linguistic reconstruction. The voice affix on the verb appears in red text, while the subject, which the affix selects, appears in underlined bold italics. Four voices have been reconstructed for Proto-Austronesian: Actor Voice, Patient Voice, Locative Voice and Instrument Voice.

Proto-Austronesian

* K‹um›aen Semay Cau.
{} ‹AV›eat rice man
"The man is eating some rice."

* Kaen-en nu Cau Semay.
{} eat-PV ERG man rice
"A/the man is eating the rice." (or "The rice is being eaten by a/the man.")

* Kaen-an nu Cau Semay Rumaq.
{} eat-LV ERG man rice house
"The man is eating rice in the house." (or "The house is being eaten rice in by the man.")

* Si-kaen nu Cau Semay lima-ni-á.
{} IV-eat ERG man rice hand-GEN-3SG
"The man is eating rice with his hand." (or "His_{i} hand is being eaten rice with by the man_{i}.")

== Formosan examples ==
The data below come from Formosan, a geographic grouping of all Austronesian languages that belong outside of Malayo-Polynesian. The Formosan languages are primarily spoken in Taiwan.

=== Amis ===
Amis has four voices: Actor Voice, Patient Voice, Locative Voice, and Instrument Voice.

The direct case marker, which marks the subject in Amis, is ku.

Mi-ʔaɬup ku kapah tu vavuy.
AV-hunt DIR {young man} ACC pig
"A young man hunts a pig."

Ma-ʔaɬup nu kapah ku vavuy.
PV-hunt ERG {young man} DIR pig
"A young man hunts a pig." (or "A pig is hunted by a young man.)

Pi-ʔaɬup-an nu kapah kura lutuk tu vavuy.
LV-hunt-LV ERG {young man} that.DIR mountain ACC pig
"A young man hunts a pig on that mountain." (or "That mountain is hunted a pig on by a young man.")

Sa-pi-ʔaɬup nu kapah ku ʔiluc tu vavuy.
IV-hunt ERG {young man} DIR spear ACC pig
"A young man hunts a pig with a spear." (or "A spear is hunted a pig with by a young man.")

=== Atayal ===
While they both have the same number of voices, the two dialects of Atayal presented below do differ in the shape of the circumstantial voice prefix. In Mayrinax, the circumstantial voice prefix is si-, whereas in Squliq, it is s-.

==== Mayrinax ====
Mayrinax has four voices: Actor Voice, Patient Voice, Locative Voice, and Circumstantial Voice.

The circumstantial Voice prefix selects for benefactee and instrument subjects.

The direct case morpheme in Mayrinax is kuʔ.

M-aras cuʔ qusiaʔ kuʔ makurakis.
AV-fetch ACC water DIR girl
"The girl fetches water."

Ras-un nkuʔ makurakis kuʔ qusiaʔ.
fetch-PV ERG girl DIR water
"The girl fetches water." (or "Water is fetched by the girl.")

Ras-an nkuʔ makurakis cuʔ qusiaʔ kuʔ βintaŋ ka hani.
fetch-LV ERG girl ACC water DIR {water bucket} LIG this
"The girl fetches water in this water bucket." (or "This water bucket is fetched water in by the girl.")

Si-ʔaras nkuʔ makurakis cuʔ qusiaʔ kuʔ mamaliku=niaʔ.
CV-fetch ERG girl ACC water DIR husband=3SG.GEN
"The girl fetches water for her husband." (or "Her husband_{i} is fetched water for by the girl_{i}.")

Si-ʔaras nkuʔ makurakis cuʔ qusiaʔ kuʔ βintaŋ ka hani.
CV-fetch ERG girl ACC water DIR {water bucket} LIG this
"The girl fetches water with this water bucket." (or "This water bucket is fetched water with by the girl.")

==== Squliq ====
Squliq has four voices: Actor Voice, Patient Voice, Locative Voice, and Circumstantial Voice.

The circumstantial voice prefix selects for benefactee and instrument subjects.

The direct case morpheme in Squliq is qu’.

M-aniq qulih qu’ Tali’.
AV-eat fish DIR Tali
"Tali eats fish."

Niq-un na’ Tali’ qu’ qulih qasa.
eat-PV ERG Tali DIR fish that
"Tali eats that fish." (or "That fish is eaten by Tali.")

Niq-an na’ Tali’ qulih qu’ ngasal qasa.
eat-LV ERG Tali fish DIR house that
"Tali eats fish in that house." (or "That house is eaten fish in by Tali.")

S-qaniq na’ Tali’ qulih qu’ Sayun.
CV-eat ERG Tali fish DIR Sayun
"Tali eats fish for Sayun." (or "Sayun is eaten fish for by Tali.")

S-qaniq na’ Tali’ qulih qu’ qway.
CV-eat ERG Tali fish DIR chopsticks
"Tali eats fish with chopsticks." (or "Chopsticks are eaten fish with by Tali.")

=== Hla’alua ===
Hla’alua has three voices: Actor Voice, Patient Voice and Circumstantial Voice.

The circumstantial voice suffix selects for location and theme subjects.

While bound pronouns have a direct case form, nouns do not bear a special direct case marker for subjects in Hla’alua.

Hli-um-u=cu=aku hlavate usua.
ASP-AV-eat=ASP=1SG.DIR guava two
"I have eaten two guavas."

Hli-paipekel-a=cu a Eleke a tangusuhlu=na.
ASP-mould-PV=ASP DET Eleke DET rice.cake=DEF
"Eleke has moulded the rice cake." (or "The rice cake has been moulded by Eleke.")

Hli-aala-ana ’Angai vutukuhlu a hluuhlungu=na.
ASP-take-CV ’Angai fish DET stream=DEF
"’Angai has caught fish in the stream." (or "The stream has been caught fish in by ’Angai.")

Hli-aala-ana=ku a vahlituku-isa ama’a.
ASP-take-CV=1SG.ERG DET money-3 father
"I have taken father's money." (or "Father's money has been taken by me.")

=== Kanakanavu ===
Kanakanavu has four voices: Actor Voice, Patient Voice, Locative Voice, and Instrument Voice.

The direct case morpheme, which optionally marks the subject in Kanakanavu, is sua.

K‹um›aʉn (sua) ŋiau tapianaŋai.
‹AV›eat DIR cat bird
"A cat ate a bird."

Cʉʔʉr-ai maanu iisi (sua) tacau iisa.
see-PV child this DIR dog that
"This child saw that dog." (or "That dog was seen by this child.")

Riucuucu-an Mu'u (sua) PaicU.
kiss-LV Mu'u DIR PaicU
"Mu'u kissed PaicU." (or "PaicU was kissed by Mu'u.")

Si-puʔa maanu-maku ʔʉnai sua vantuku iisi.
IV-buy child-1SG.GEN land DIR money this
"My child bought land with this money." (or "This money was bought land with by my child.")

=== Kavalan ===
Kavalan has three voices: Actor Voice, Patient Voice and Circumstantial Voice.

The circumstantial voice prefix selects for instrument and benefactee subjects.

The direct case morpheme, which marks the subject in Kavalan, is ya.

Q‹em›al tu rasung ya sunis.
‹AV›dig ACC well DIR child
"The child dug a well."

Qal-an na sunis ya rasung.
dig-PV ERG child DIR well
"The child dug the well." (or The well was dug by the child.")

Ti-tangan=ku tu ineb ya suqsuq.
CV-open=1SG.ERG ACC door DIR key
"I opened the door with the key." (or "The key was opened the door with by me.")

Ti-sammay na tama=ku ya tina=ku.
CV-cook ERG father=1SG.GEN DIR mother-1SG.GEN
"My father cooked for my mother." (or "My mother was cooked for by my father.")

=== Paiwan ===
Paiwan has four voices: Actor Voice, Patient Voice, Locative Voice, and Instrument Voice.

The direct case morpheme, which marks the subject in Paiwan, is a.

Q‹m›ałup a tsautsau tua vavuy i (tua) gadu tua vuluq.
‹AV›hunt DIR man OBL pig PREP (OBL) mountain OBL spear
"The man hunts the pigs in the mountains with a spear."

Qałup-en nua tsautsau a vavuy i (tua) gadu tua vuluq.
hunt-PV ERG man DIR pig PREP (OBL) mountain OBL spear
"The man hunts the pigs in the mountains with a spear." (or "The pigs are hunted by the man in the mountains with a spear.")

Qałup-an nua tsautsau tua vavuy a gadu tua vuluq.
hunt-LV ERG man OBL pig DIR mountain OBL spear
"The man hunts the pigs in the mountains with a spear." (or "The mountains are hunted the pigs in by the man with a spear.")

Si-qałup nua tsautsau tua vavuy i (tua) gadu a vuluq.
IV-hunt ERG man OBL pig PREP (OBL) mountain DIR spear
"The man hunts the pigs in the mountains with a spear." (or "The spear is hunted the pigs with by the man in the mountains.")

=== Pazeh ===
Pazeh, which became extinct in 2010, had four voices: Actor Voice, Patient Voice, Locative Voice, and Instrument Voice.

The direct case morpheme, which marks the subject in Pazeh, is ki.

Mu-ngazip yaku ki wazu.
AV-bite 1SG DIR dog
"The dog bit me."

Ngazib-en wazu lia ki rakihan.
bite-PV dog ASP DIR child
"A dog bit the child." (or The child was bitten by a dog.")

Pu-batu’-an lia ki babaw daran.
pave-stone-LV ASP DIR above road
"The road surface was paved with stones."

Saa-talek alaw ki bulayan.
IV-cook fish DIR pan
"The pan was cooked fish with."

=== Puyuma ===
Puyuma has four voices: Actor Voice, Patient Voice, Locative Voice, and Circumstantial Voice.

The circumstantial voice suffix selects for benefactee and instrument subjects.

The direct case morpheme, which marks the subject in Puyuma, is na or i.

Tr‹em›akaw dra paisu i Isaw.
‹AT.RL›steal ACC money DIR Isaw
"Isaw stole money."

Tu=trakaw-aw na paisu kan Isaw.
3.ERG=steal-PT.RL DIR money ERG Isaw
"Isaw stole the money." (or "The money was stolen by Isaw.")

Tu=trakaw-ay=ku dra paisu kan Isaw.
3.ERG=steal-LT.RL=1SG.DIR ACC money ERG Isaw
"Isaw stole money from me." (or "I was stolen money from by Isaw.")

Tu=trakaw-anay i tinataw dra paisu.
3.ERG=steal-CT.RL DIR his.mother ACC money
"He stole money for his mother." (or "His_{i} mother was stolen money for by him_{i}.")

Ku=dirus-anay na enay kan Aliwaki.
1SG.ERG=wash-CT.RL DIR water ACC Aliwaki
"I washed Aliwaki with water." (or "The water was washed Aliwaki with by me.")

=== Seediq ===
The two dialects of Seediq presented below each have a different number of voices. The direct case morpheme, which marks the subject in both dialects, is ka.

==== Tgdaya ====
Tgdaya has four voices: Actor Voice, Patient Voice, Locative Voice and Instrument Voice.

S‹em›ebuc ricah ka Pawan.
‹AV›hit plum DIR Pawan
"Pawan is hitting plums."

Sebet-un na Pawan ka ricah.
hit-PV ERG Pawan DIR plum
"Pawan is hitting the plum." (or "The plum is being hit by Pawan.")

Sebet-an na Pawan ricah ka peepah.
hit-LV ERG Pawan plum DIR farm.field
"Pawan is hitting plums in the farm field." (or "The farm field is being hit plums in by Pawan.")

Se-sebuc na Pawan ricah ka butakan.
IV-hit ERG Pawan plum DIR stick
"Pawan is hitting plums with the stick." (or "The stick is being hit plums with by Pawan.")

==== Truku ====
Truku has three voices: Actor Voice, Goal Voice, and Circumstantial Voice.

The goal voice suffix selects for patient and location subjects. The circumstantial voice prefix selects for benefactee and instrument subjects.

K‹em›erut babuy ka Masaw.
‹AV›cut pig DIR Masaw
"Masaw slaughters a/the pig."

Keret-an Masaw ka babuy.
cut-GV Masaw DIR pig
"Masaw slaughters the pig." (or "The pig is slaughtered by Masaw.")

Keret-an laqi sagas ka keti’inuh ni’i.
cut-GV child watermelon DIR board this
"The child cuts watermelon on this board." (or "This board is cut watermelon on by the child.")

Se-kerut babuy Masaw ka baki.
CV-cut pig Masaw DIR old.man
"Masaw slaughters a/the pig for the old man." (or "The old man is slaughtered a/the pig for by Masaw.")

Se-kerut babuy Masaw ka puting.
CV-cut pig Masaw DIR knife
"Masaw slaughters a/the pig with the knife." (or "The knife is slaughtered a/the pig with by Masaw.")

=== Tsou ===
Tsou has four voices: Actor Voice, Patient Voice, Locative Voice, and Benefactive Voice. In addition to the voice morphology on the main verb, auxiliary verbs in Tsou, which are obligatory in the sentence, are also marked for voice. However, auxiliaries only differentiate between Actor Voice and non-Actor Voice (in green text).

The direct case morpheme, which marks subjects in Tsou, is ’o.

Mi-’o mo-si to peisu ne Nookay.
AUX.AV-1SG.DIR AV-put OBL money OBL Nookay
"I deposit money in Nookay."

Os-’o si-a to panka ’o peisu.
AUX.NAV-1SG.ERG put-PV OBL table DIR money
"I put the money on the/a table." (or "The money was put on the/a table by me.")

Os-’o si-i to chumu ’o kopu.
AUX.NAV-1SG.ERG put-LV OBL water DIR cup
"I put water into the cup." (or "The cup was put water into by me.")

Os-’o si-i-neni to ocha ’o Pasuya.
AUX.NAV-1SG.ERG put-LV-BV OBL tea DIR Pasuya
"I served tea for Pasuya." (or "Pasuya was served tea for by me.")

== Batanic examples ==
The data below come from the Batanic languages, a subgroup under Malayo-Polynesian. These languages are spoken on the islands found in the Luzon Strait, between Taiwan and the Philippines.

=== Ivatan ===
Ivatan has four voices: Actor Voice, Patient Voice, Locative Voice, and Circumstantial Voice.

The circumstantial voice prefix selects for instrument and benefactee subjects.

The direct case morpheme, which marks the subject in Ivatan, is qo.

Mangamoqmo qo tao so motdeh no boday do vahay.
m-pang-qamoqmo {} {} {} {} {} {} {} {}
AV-¿?-frighten DIR man ACC child IND snake OBL house
"The man is frightening a child with a snake in the house."

Qamoqmo-hen no tao qo motdeh no boday do vahay.
frighten-PV IND man DIR child IND snake OBL house
"The man is frightening a child with a snake in the house." (or "A child is being frightened with a snake in the house by the man.")

Pangamoqmoan no tao so motdeh no boday qo vahay.
pang-qamoqmo-an {} {} {} {} {} {} {} {}
¿?-frighten-LV IND man ACC child IND snake DIR house
"The man is frightening a child with a snake in the house." (or "The house is being frightened a child in with a snake by the man.")

Qipangamoqmo no tao so motdeh qo boday do vahay.
qi-pang-qamoqmo {} {} {} {} {} {} {} {}
CV-¿?-frighten IND man ACC child DIR snake OBL house
"The man is frightening a child with a snake in the house." (or "The snake is being frightened a child with in the house by the man.")

Qipangamoqmo no tao so motdeh no boday do vahay qo kayvan-a.
qi-pang-qamoqmo {} {} {} {} {} {} {} {} {} {}
CV-¿?-frighten IND man ACC child IND snake OBL house DIR friend-3SG.GEN
"The man is frightening a child with a snake in the house for his friend." (or "His_{i} friend is being frightened a child for with a snake in the house by the man_{i}.")

=== Yami ===
Yami has four voices: Actor Voice, Patient Voice, Locative Voice, and Instrument Voice.

The direct case morpheme, which marks subjects in Yami, is si for proper names, and o for common nouns.

K‹om›an so wakay si Salang.
‹AV›eat OBL {sweet potato} DIR Salang
"Salang ate a sweet potato."

Kan-en na ni Salang o wakay.
eat-PV 3SG.ERG ERG Salang DIR {sweet potato}
"Salang ate the sweet potato." (or "The sweet potato was eaten by Salang.")

Ni-akan-an na o mogis ori ni Salang.
ASP-eat-LV 3SG.ERG DIR rice that ERG Salang
"Salang ate from some of that rice." (or "Some of that rice was eaten from by Salang.")

I-akan na ni Salang o among ya.
IV-eat 3SG.ERG ERG Salang DIR fish this
"Salang ate (a meal) with this fish." (or "This fish was eaten (a meal) with by Salang.")

== Philippine examples ==
The data below come from Philippine languages, a subgroup under Malayo-Polynesian, predominantly spoken across the Philippines, with some found on the island of Sulawesi in Indonesia.

=== Blaan ===
Blaan has four voices: Actor Voice, Patient Voice, Instrument Voice, and Non-Actor Voice.

The non-Actor Voice affix selects for patient and location subjects, depending on the inherent voice of the verb.

Agent Prefocus Base
Patient Prefocus Base
Instrument Prefocus Base
(1)

Stifun ale.
assemble 3PL.DIR
"They assemble."

(1)

M-bat agu bula.
AV-throw 1SG.DIR ball
"I throw the ball."

(1)

K‹am›lang agu kayu.
‹AV›cut 1SG.DIR tree
"I cut the tree."

(2)

S‹am›tifun ale dad to.
‹AV›assemble 3PL.DIR PL person
"They assemble the people."

(2)

Bat=gu bula.
throw=1SG.ERG ball
"I throw the ball"
(or "The ball is thrown by me.")

(2)

K‹an›lang=gu kayu.
‹NAV›cut=1SG.ERG tree
"I cut the tree."
(or "The tree is cut by me.")

(3)

S‹an›tifun=la dad to.
‹NAV›assemble=3PL.ERG PL person
"They assemble the people."
(or "The people are assembled by them.")

(3)

N-bat=gu bula diding.
NAV-throw=1SG.ERG ball wall
"I throw the ball at the wall."
(or "The wall is thrown the ball at by me.")

(3)

Klang=gu kayu falakol.
cut=1SG.ERG tree hatchet
"I cut the tree with the hatchet."
(or "The hatchet is cut the tree with by me.")

=== Cebuano ===
Cebuano has four voices: Actor Voice, Patient Voice, Circumstantial Voice, and Instrument Voice.

The circumstantial voice suffix selects for location, benefactee and goal subjects.

The direct case morpheme, which marks the subject in Cebuano, is ang or si.

Mo-lutò si Maria ug kalamáy para kang Pedro.
AV-cook DIR Maria ACC type.of.dessert for OBL Pedro
"Maria will cook kalamáy for Pedro."

Luto-on sa babaye ang bugás sa lata.
cook-PV ERG woman DIR rice OBL can
"The woman will cook the rice in the can."
(or "The rice will be cooked by the woman in the can.")

Luto-an sa babaye ang lata ug bugás.
cook-CV ERG woman DIR can ACC rice
"The woman will cook rice in the can."
(or "The can will be cooked rice in by the woman.")

Luto-an ni Maria si Pedro ug kalamáy.
cook-CV ERG Maria DIR Pedro ACC type.of.dessert
"Maria will cook Pedro kalamáy."
(or "Pedro will be cooked kalamáy for by Maria.")

Sulat-án ni Inday si Perla ug sulat.
write-CV ERG Inday DIR Perla ACC letter
"Inday will write Perla a letter."
(or "Perla will be written a letter to by Inday.")

I-sulát ni Linda ang lapis ug sulat.
IV-write ERG Linda DIR pencil ACC letter
"Linda will write a letter with the pencil."
(or "The pencil will be written a letter with by Linda.")

=== Kalagan ===
Kalagan has four voices: Actor Voice, Patient Voice, Instrument Voice, and Circumstantial Voice.

The circumstantial voice suffix selects for benefactee and location subjects.

The direct case morpheme, which marks the subject in Kalagan, is ya. The direct case form of the first person, singular pronoun is aku, whereas the ergative case form is ku.

K‹um›amang aku sa tubig na lata kan Ma’ adti balkon na lunis.
‹AV›get 1SG.DIR OBL water PREP can for Dad on porch PREP Monday
"I will get the water with the can for Dad on the porch on Monday."

Kamang-in ku ya tubig na lata kan Ma’ adti balkon na lunis.
get-PV 1SG.ERG DIR water PREP can for Dad on porch PREP Monday
"I will get the water with the can for Dad on the porch on Monday."
(or "The water will be gotten by me with the can for Dad on the porch on Monday.")

Pag-kamang ku ya lata sa tubig kan Ma’ adti balkon na lunis.
IV-get 1SG.ERG DIR can OBL water for Dad on porch PREP Monday
"I will get the water with the can for Dad on the porch on Monday."
(or "The can will be gotten the water with by me for Dad on the porch on Monday.")

Kamang-an ku ya Ma’ sa tubig na lata adti balkon na lunis.
get-CV 1SG.ERG DIR Dad OBL water PREP can on porch PREP Monday
"I will get the water with the can for Dad on the porch on Monday."
(or "Dad will be gotten the water for by me with the can on the porch on Monday.")

Kamang-an ku ya balkon sa tubig na lata kan Ma’ na lunis.
get-CV 1SG.ERG DIR porch OBL water PREP can for Dad PREP Monday
"I will get the water with the can for Dad on the porch on Monday."
(or "The porch will be gotten the water from by me with the can for Dad on Monday.")

=== Kapampangan ===
Kapampangan has five voices: Actor Voice, Patient Voice, Goal Voice, Locative Voice, and Circumstantial Voice.

The circumstantial voice prefix selects for instrument and benefactee subjects.

The direct case morpheme in Kapampangan is ing, which marks singular subjects, and reng, which is for plural subjects. Non-subject agents are marked with ergative case, ning, while non-subject patients are marked with accusative case, -ng, which is cliticized onto the preceding word.

S‹um›ulat yang poesia ing lalaki gamit pen king papil.
{} ya=ng {} {} {} {} {} {} {}
‹AV›will.write 3SG.DIR=ACC poem DIR boy OBL pen OBL paper
"The boy will write a poem with a pen on the paper."

I-sulat ne ning lalaki ing poesia king mestra.
{} na+ya {} {} {} {} {} {}
PV-will.write 3SG.ERG+3SG.DIR ERG boy DIR poem OBL teacher.F
"The boy will write the poem to the teacher."
(or "The poem will be written by boy to the teacher.")

Sulat-anan ne ning lalaki ing mestro.
{} na+ya {} {} {} {}
will.write-GV 3SG.ERG+3SG.DIR ERG boy DIR teacher.M
"The boy will write to the teacher."
(or "The teacher will be written to by the boy.")

Pi-sulat-an neng poesia ning lalaki ing blackboard.
{} na+ya=ng {} {} {} {} {}
LV-will.write-LV 3SG.ERG+3SG.DIR=ACC poem ERG boy DIR blackboard
"The boy will write a poem on the blackboard."
(or "The blackboard will be written a poem on by the boy.")

Panyulat neng poesia ning lalaki ing pen.
paN-sulat na+ya=ng {} {} {} {} {}
CV-will.write 3SG.ERG+3SG.DIR=ACC poem ERG boy DIR pen
"The boy will write a poem with the pen."
(or "The pen will be written a poem with by the boy.")

Pamasa nong libru ning babai reng anak.
paN-basa na+la=ng {} {} {} {} {}
CV-will.read 3SG.ERG+3PL.DIR=ACC book ERG woman PL.DIR child
"The woman will read a book for the children."
(or "The children will be read a book for by the woman.")

=== Limos Kalinga ===
Limos Kalinga has five voices: Actor Voice, Patient Voice, Locative Voice, Benefactive Voice and Instrument Voice.

Except for when the subject is the agent, the subject is found directly after the agent in the clause.

Nandalus si Malia=t danat palatu.
n-man-dalus {} {} {} {}
ASP-AV-wash DIR Malia=OBL PL plate
"Malia washed some plates."

Binayum din pagoy.
b‹in›ayu-∅=m {} {}
‹ASP›pound-PV=2SG.ERG DIR rice
"You pounded the rice."
(or "The rice was pounded by you.")

D‹in›alus-an ud Malia danat palatu.
‹ASP›wash-LV ERG Malia DIR.PL plate
"Malia washed the plates."
(or "The plates were washed by Malia.")

I-n-dalus-an ud Malia si ina=na=t nat palatu.
BV-ASP-wash-BV ERG Malia DIR mother=3SG.GEN=OBL SG plate
"Malia washed a plate for her mother."
(or "Her_{i} mother was washed a plate for by Malia_{i}.")

I-n-dalus ud Malia nat sabun sinat palatu.
IV-ASP-wash ERG Malia DIR soap OBL.SG plate
"Malia washed a plate with the soap."
(or "The soap was washed a plate with by Malia.")

=== Maranao ===
Maranao has four voices: Actor Voice, Patient Voice, Circumstantial Voice, and Instrument Voice.

The circumstantial suffix selects for benefactee and location subjects.

The direct case morpheme, which marks the subject in Maranao, is so.

S‹om›ombali’ so mama’ sa karabao ko maior.
‹AV›butcher DIR man OBL water.buffalo PREP mayor
"The man will butcher water buffalo for the mayor."

Sombali’-in o mama’ so karabao.
butcher-PV ERG man DIR water.buffalo
"The man will butcher the water buffalo."
(or "The water buffalo will be butchered by the man.")

Sombali’-an o mama’ so maior sa karabao.
butcher-CV ERG man DIR mayor OBL water.buffalo
"The man will butcher water buffalo for the mayor."
(or "The mayor will be butchered water buffalo for by the man.")

Koaq-an o mama’ sa bolong so tinda.
get-CV ERG man OBL medicine DIR store
"The man will get the medicine at/from the store."
(or "The store will be gotten medicine at/from by the man.")

I-sombali’ o mama’ so gelat ko karabao.
butcher-IV ERG man DIR knife PREP water.buffalo
"The man will butcher the water buffalo with the knife."
(or "The knife will be butchered the water buffalo with by the man.")

=== Palawan ===
Palawan has four voices: Actor Voice, Patient Voice, Instrument Voice, and Circumstantial Voice.

The circumstantial voice suffix selects for benefactee and location subjects.

‹Mog›lamuʔ libun in ot lugow kot mosakit sot apuy.
‹ASP.AV›cook woman that.DIR IND congee for {sick person} on fire
"The woman will cook congee on the fire for the sick person."

La~lamuʔ-on ot libun lugow in kot mosakit sot apuy.
ASP~cook-PV IND woman congee that.DIR for {sick person} on fire
"The woman will cook the congee on the fire for the sick person."
(or "The congee will be cooked on the fire for the sick person by the woman.")

I-la~lamuʔ ot libun lugow kot mosakit apuy in.
IV-ASP~cook IND woman congee for {sick person} fire that.DIR
"The woman will cook congee with the fire for the sick person."
(or "The fire will be cooked congee with for the sick person by the woman.")

La~lamuʔ-an ot libun ot lugow sot apuy mosakit in.
ASP~cook-CV IND woman IND congee on fire {sick person} that.DIR
"The woman will cook congee on the fire for the sick person."
(or "The sick person will be cooked congee for on the fire by the woman.")

La~lamuʔ-an ot libun ot lugow kot mosakit apuy in.
ASP~cook-CV IND woman IND congee for {sick person} fire that.DIR
"The woman will cook congee on the fire for the sick person."
(or "The fire will be cooked congee on for the sick person by the woman.")

=== Subanen ===
Subanen has three voices: Actor Voice, Patient Voice, and Circumstantial Voice.

The examples below are from Western Subanon, and the direct case morpheme in this language is og.

S‹um›aluy og polopanad nog kolatas.
‹ASP.AV›buy DIR teacher IND paper
"A teacher will buy some paper."

Soluy-on nog polopanad og kolatas.
buy-ASP.PV IND teacher DIR paper
"A teacher will buy some paper."
(or "Some paper will be bought by a teacher.")

Soluy-an nog polopanad og bata′ nog kolatas.
buy-ASP.CV IND teacher DIR child IND paper
"A teacher will buy some paper for a child."
(or "A child will be bought some paper for by a teacher.")

=== Tagalog ===
Tagalog has six voices: Actor Voice, Patient Voice, Locative Voice, Benefactive Voice, Instrument Voice, and Reason Voice.

The locative voice suffix selects for location and goal subjects. (In the examples below, the goal subject and the benefactee subject are the same noun phrase.)

The reason voice prefix can only be affixed to certain roots, the majority of which are for emotion verbs (e.g., galit "be angry", sindak "be shocked"). However, verb roots such as matay "die", sakit "get sick", and iyak "cry" may also be marked with the reason voice prefix.

The direct case morpheme, which marks subjects in Tagalog, is ang. The indirect case morpheme, ng /naŋ/, which is the conflation of the ergative and accusative cases seen in Proto-Malayo-Polynesian, marks non-subject agents and non-subject patients.

B‹um›ili ng mangga sa palengke para sa ale sa pamamagitan ng pera ang mama.
‹ASP.AV›buy IND mango OBL market for OBL woman OBL means IND money DIR man
"The man bought a mango at the market for the woman by means of money."

B‹in›ili-∅ ng mama sa palengke para sa ale sa pamamagitan ng pera ang mangga.
‹ASP›buy-PV IND man OBL market for OBL woman OBL means IND money DIR mango
"The man bought the mango at the market for the woman by means of money."
(or "The mango was bought by the man at the market for the woman by means of money.")

B‹in›ilh-an ng mama ng mangga para sa ale sa pamamagitan ng pera ang palengke.
‹ASP›buy-LV IND man IND mango for OBL woman OBL means IND money DIR market
"The man bought a mango at the market for the woman by means of money."
(or "At the market was bought a mango by the man for the woman by means of money.")

B‹in›ilh-an ng mama ng mangga sa palengke sa pamamagitan ng pera ang ale.
‹ASP›buy-LV IND man IND mango OBL market OBL means IND money DIR woman
"The man bought a mango at the market for the woman by means of money."
(or "The woman was bought a mango for by the man at the market by means of money.")

I-b‹in›ili ng mama ng mangga sa palengke sa pamamagitan ng pera ang ale.
BV-‹ASP›buy IND man IND mango OBL market OBL means IND money DIR woman
"The man bought a mango at the market for the woman by means of money."
(or "The woman was bought a mango for by the man at the market by means of money.")

Ipinambili ng mama ng mangga sa palengke para sa ale ang pera.
Ip‹in›aN-bili {} {} {} {} {} {} {} {} {} {} {}
‹ASP›IV-buy IND man IND mango OBL market for OBL woman DIR money
"The man bought a mango at the market for the woman by means of money."
(or "The money was bought a mango with by the man at the market for the woman.")

Ik‹in›a-iyak ng bata ang pag-kagat sa kaniya ng langgam.
‹ASP›RV-cry IND child DIR NMLZ-bite OBL 3SG.OBL IND ant
"The child cried because an/the ant bit him."
(or "An/the ant's biting of him was cried about by the child.")

‹Um›iyak ang bata dahil k‹in›agat-∅ siya ng langgam.
‹ASP.AV›cry DIR child because ‹ASP›bite-PV 3SG.DIR IND ant
"The child cried because an/the ant bit him."
(or "The child cried because he was bitten by an/the ant.")

=== Tondano ===
Tondano has four voices: Actor Voice, Patient Voice, Locative Voice, and Circumstantial Voice.

The circumstantial Voice selects for instrument, benefactee, and theme subjects.

The subject is found in sentence-initial position, before the verb.

Si tuama k‹um›eoŋ roda wo n-tali waki pasar.
AN.SG man ‹AV›will.pull cart with INAN-rope to market
"The man will pull the cart with the rope to the market."

Roda keoŋ-ən ni tuama wo n-tali waki pasar.
cart will.pull-PV ERG.AN.SG man with INAN-rope to market
"The man will pull the cart with the rope to the market."
(or "The cart will be pulled with rope to the market by the man.")

Pasar keoŋ-an ni tuama roda wo n-tali.
market will.pull-LV ERG.AN.SG man cart with INAN-rope
"The man will pull the cart with the rope to the market."
(or "The market will be pulled the cart to with the rope by the man.")

Tali i-keoŋ ni tuama roda waki pasar.
rope CV-will.pull ERG.AN.SG man cart to market
"The man will pull the cart with the rope to the market."
(or "The rope will be pulled the cart with to the market by the man.")

Se okiʔ i-lutuʔ ni mama seraʔ
AN.PL child CV-will.cook ERG.AN.SG mother fish
"Mother will cook fish for the children."
(or "The children will be cooked fish for by mother.")

Ləloŋkotan i-wareŋ ni tuama waki wale.
ladder CV-will.return ERG.AN.SG man to house
"The man will return the ladder to the house."
(or "The ladder will be returned by the man to the house.")

== North Bornean examples ==
The data below come from North Bornean languages, a grouping under Malayo-Polynesian, mainly spoken on the northern parts of Borneo, spanning administrative areas of Malaysia and Indonesia.

=== Bonggi ===
Bonggi has four voices: Actor Voice, Patient Voice, Instrumental Voice, and Circumstantial Voice.

The circumstantial voice suffix selects for benefactee and goal subjects.

The subject is found in sentence-initial position, before the verb.

Sia imagi louk nyu.
{} in-N-bagi {} {}
3SG.DIR RL-AV-divide fish 2PL.GEN
"He divided your fish."

Louk nyu biagi nya.
{} {} b‹in›agi-∅ {}
fish 2PL.GEN ‹RL›divide-PV 3SG.ERG
"He divided your fish." (or "Your fish was divided by him.")

Badiʔ ku pimagi nya louk nyu.
{} {} p‹in›əN-bagi {} {} {}
machete 1SG.GEN ‹RL›IV-divide 3SG.ERG fish 2PL.GEN
"He divided your fish with my machete." (or "My machete was divided your fish with by him.")

Ou bigiadn nya louk nyu.
{} b‹in›agi-adn {} {} {}
1SG.DIR ‹RL›divide-CV 3SG.ERG fish 2PL.GEN
"He divided your fish for me." (or "I was divided your fish for by him.")

Ou biniriadn nya siidn.
{} b‹in›ori-adn {} {}
1SG.DIR ‹RL›give-CV 3SG.ERG money
"He gave money to me." (or "I was given money to by him.")

=== Kadazan Dusun ===
Kadazan Dusun has three voices: Actor Voice, Patient Voice and Benefactive Voice.

The direct case morpheme, which marks the subject in Kadazan Dusun, is i.

Mog-ovit i ama’ di tanak do buuk.
AV-bring DIR father IND child ACC book
"Father is bringing the child a book."

Ovit-on di ama’ di tanak i buuk.
bring-PV IND father IND child DIR book
"Father is bringing the child the book." (or "The book is being brought to the child by Father.")

Ovit-an di ama’ i tanak do buuk.
bring-BV IND father DIR child ACC book
"Father is bringing the child a book." (or "The child is being brought a book to by Father.")

=== Kelabit ===
Kelabit has three voices: Actor Voice, Patient Voice and Instrument Voice.

Unlike other languages presented here, Kelabit does not use case-marking or word-ordering strategies to indicate the subject of the clause. However, certain syntactic processes, such as relativization, target the subject. Relativizing non-subjects results in ungrammatical sentences.

La’ih sineh nenekul nubaq nedih ngen seduk.
{} {} in-N-tekul {} {} {} {}
man that ASP-AV-spoon.up rice 3SG.GEN with spoon
"That man spooned his rice up with a spoon."

Sikul la’ih sineh nubaq nedih ngen seduk.
t‹in›ekul-∅ {} {} {} {} {} {}
‹ASP›spoon.up-PV man that rice 3SG.GEN with spoon.
"That man spooned his rice up with a spoon." (or "His_{i} rice was spooned up with a spoon by that man_{i}.")

Seduk penenekul la’ih sineh nubaq nedih.
{} p‹in›eN-tekul {} {} {} {}
spoon ‹ASP›IV-spoon.up man that rice 3SG.GEN
"That man spooned his rice up with a spoon." (or "A spoon was spooned his_{i} rice up with by that man_{i}.")

=== Kimaragang ===
Kimaragang has five voices: Actor Voice, Patient Voice, Benefactive Voice, Instrument Voice and Locative Voice.

Only intransitive verbs can be marked with the locative voice suffix, which looks similar to the patient voice suffix.

The direct case marker, which marks the subject in Kimaragang, is it for definite nouns and ot for indefinite nouns.

Mangalapak oku do niyuw.
m-poN-lapak {} {} {}
AV-TR-split 1SG.DIR IND.INDF coconut
"I will split a coconut/some coconuts."

Lapak-on ku it niyuw.
split-PV 1SG.IND DIR.DEF coconut
"I will split the coconuts." (or "The coconuts will be split by me.")

Lapak-an ku do niyuw it wogok.
split-BV 1SG.IND IND.INDF coconut DIR.DEF pig
"I will split some coconuts for the pigs." (or "The pigs will be split some coconuts for by me.")

Tongo ot pangalapak nu dilo’ niyuw ______?
{} {} ∅-poN-lapak {} {} {} {}
what DIR.INDF IT-TR-split 2SG.IND that.IND coconut DIR
"What will you split those coconuts with?" (or "The thing that will be split those coconuts with by you is what?")

Siombo ot ogom-on ku _____?
where DIR.INDF sit-LV 1SG.IND DIR
"Where shall I sit?" (or "The thing that will be sat upon by me is where?")

=== Timugon Murut ===
Timugon Murut has five voices: Actor Voice, Patient Voice, Benefactive Voice, Instrument Voice, and Circumstantial Voice.

There is no direct case marker to mark subjects in Timugon Murut. However, non-subject agents are marked with the ergative case marker, du, while non-subject non-agents are marked with the oblique case marker, da.

Mambali dŭanduʔ=ti da=konoon da=dalaiŋ=no da=sŭab=no da=duit=na-no.
m-paN-bali {} {} {} {} {}
AV-¿?-buy woman=DET OBL=clothes OBL=child=DET OBL=morning=DET OBL=money=3SG.GEN-DET
"The woman will buy clothes for the child in the morning with her money."

Bali-on konoon du=dŭanduʔ=ti da=dalaiŋ=no da=sŭab=no da=duit=na-no.
buy-PV clothes ERG=woman=DET OBL=child=DET OBL=morning=DET OBL=money=3SG.GEN-DET
"The woman will buy clothes for the child in the morning with her money." (or "Clothes will be bought for the child in the morning by the woman with her money.")

Bali-in dalaiŋ=no da=konoon du=dŭanduʔ=ti da=sŭab=no da=duit=na-no.
buy-BV child=DET OBL=clothes ERG=woman=DET OBL=morning=DET OBL=money=3SG.GEN-DET
"The woman will buy clothes for the child in the morning with her money." (or "The child will be bought clothes for in the morning by the woman with her money.")

Duit=na-no pambabali du=dŭanduʔ=ti da=konoon da=dalaiŋ=no da=sŭab=no.
{} paN-CV~bali {} {} {} {}
money=3SG.GEN-DET ¿?-IV~buy ERG=woman=DET OBL=clothes OBL=child=DET OBL=morning=DET
"The woman will buy clothes for the child in the morning with her money." (or "Her_{i} money will be bought clothes with for the child in the morning by the woman_{i}.")

Sŭab=na pambalian du=dŭanduʔ=ti da=konoon da=dalaiŋ=no da=duit=na-no.
{} paN-bali-an {} {} {} {}
morning=DET ¿?-buy-CV ERG=woman=DET OBL=clothes OBL=child=DET OBL=money=3SG.GEN-DET
"The woman will buy clothes for the child in the morning with her money." (or "The morning will be bought clothes in for the child by the woman with her money.")

== Malayic examples ==
The data below come from Malayic languages, a subgroup under Malayo-Polynesian, traditionally spoken on parts of Sumatra, the Malay Peninsula, Borneo, and the islands between.

=== Besemah ===
Besemah (a dialect of South Barisan Malay spoken in southwestern Sumatra) has two voices: Agentive Voice and Patientive Voice.

Jeme ngambik sidu gale.
{} ng-ambik {} {}
people AV-take spoon all
"All people took the spoons."

Sidu diambik jeme gale.
{} di-ambik {} {}
spoon PV-take people all
"The people took all the spoons."

=== Indonesian ===
Indonesian has two voices: Actor Voice and Undergoer Voice.

Anak saya melihat orang itu.
{} {} me-lihat {} {}
child 1SG AV-see person DIST
"My child saw that person."

Orang itu dilihat anak saya.
{} {} di-lihat {} {}
person DIST PV-see child 1SG
"My child saw that person." (or "That person was seen (by) my child.")

== Barito examples ==
The data below represent the Barito languages, and are from a language spoken on Madagascar, off the east coast of Africa. Other languages from Barito are spoken in Indonesia and the Philippines.

=== Malagasy ===
Malagasy has three voices: Actor Voice, Patient Voice, and Circumstantial Voice.

The circumstantial voice suffix selects for instrument and benefactee subjects.

Malagasy does not have a direct case marker. However, the subject is found in sentence-final position.

Mamono akoho amin'ny antsy ny mpiompy.
m-aN-vono {} {} {} {} {}
AV-TR-kill chicken with'DET knife DET farmer
"The farmer kills chickens with the knife."

Vonoin'ny mpiompy amin'ny antsy ny akoho.
vono-ina'ny {} {} {} {} {}
kill-PV'DET farmer with'DET knife DET chicken
"The farmer kills the chickens with the knife." (or "The chickens are killed with the knife by the farmer.")

Amonoan'ny mpiompy akoho ny antsy.
aN-vono-ana'ny {} {} {} {}
TR-kill-CV'DET farmer chicken DET knife
"The farmer kills chickens with the knife." (or "The knife is killed chickens with by the farmer.")

Amonoan'ny mpiompy akoho ny vahiny.
aN-vono-ana'ny {} {} {} {}
TR-kill-CV'DET farmer chicken DET guest
"The farmer kills chickens for the guests." (or "The guests are killed chickens for by the farmer.")

== Non-Austronesian examples ==
Alignment types resembling symmetrical voice have been observed in non-Austronesian languages.

=== Nilotic ===
The Nilotic languages are a group of languages spoken in the eastern part of Sub-Saharan Africa.

==== Dinka ====
Dinka is a dialect continuum spoken in South Sudan. The two dialects presented below each have a maximum of three voices.

===== Agar =====
Andersen (1991) suggests that Agar exhibits symmetrical voice. This language has a maximum of three voices: Actor Voice, Patient Voice, and Circumstantial Voice. The subject is found in sentence-initial position, before the verb. The non-finite form of the verb found in the examples below is yḛ̂ep "cut".

ô̰ok á̰a-y‹ḛ̀›p tḭ̀im nè̤ yê̤ep.
1PL D.PL-‹AV›cut tree PREP axe
"We are cutting the tree with the axe."

tḭ̀im à̰-y‹ḛ́›p-kṳ̀ nè̤ yê̤ep.
tree D-‹PV›cut-1PL PREP axe
"We are cutting the tree with the axe." (or "The tree is being cut by us with the axe.")

yê̤ep à̰-y‹ḛ́e›p ó̰ok tḭ̀im.
axe D-‹CV›cut 1PL.GEN tree
"We are cutting the tree with the axe." (or "The axe is being used by us to cut the tree.")

However, the number of voice morphemes available in this language is reduced to two when the agent is a full noun (i.e., not a pronoun), such as in the examples below. In (5a), where the subject is a patient, and the agent is not a pronoun, the verb is marked with Circumstantial Voice. Compare to (2) above, in which the agent is pronominal, and the verb is marked with patient voice morpheme, ḛ́.

dhɔ̤̀ɔk à̰-y‹ḛ̀›p tḭ̀im nè̤ yê̤ep.
boy D-‹AV›cut tree PREP axe
"The boy is cutting the tree with the axe."

tḭ̀im à̰-y‹ḛ́e›p dhɔ̤̀ɔk nè̤ yê̤ep.
tree D-‹CV›cut boy PREP axe
"The boy is cutting the tree with the axe." (or "The tree is being cut by the boy with the axe.")

yê̤ep à̰-y‹ḛ́e›p dhɔ̤̀ɔk tḭ̀im.
axe D-‹CV›cut boy tree
"The boy is cutting the tree with the axe." (or "The axe is being cut the tree with by the boy.")

===== Bor =====
Van Urk (2015) suggests that Bor exhibits symmetrical voice. This language has three voices: Actor Voice, Patient Voice, and Circumstantial Voice.

The subject is found in sentence-initial position, before the verb. The non-finite form of the verb found in the examples below is câam "eat".

Àyén à-c‹à›m cuî̤in nè̤ pǎal.
Ayen 3SG-‹AV›eat food PREP knife
"Ayen is eating food with a knife."

Cuî̤in à-c‹ɛ́ɛ›m Áyèn nè̤ pǎal.
food 3SG-‹PV›eat Ayen.ERG PREP knife
"Ayen is eating food with a knife." (or "Food is being eaten by Ayen with a knife.")

Pǎal à-c‹ɛ́ɛ›m-è̤ Áyèn cuî̤in.
knife 3SG-‹PV›eat-CV Ayen.ERG food
"Ayen is eating food with a knife." (or "The knife is being eaten food with by Ayen.")

==== Kurmuk ====
Andersen (2015) suggests that Kurmuk, which is spoken in Sudan, has a construction that resembles symmetrical voice. This language has three voices: Actor Voice, Patient Voice, and Circumstantial Voice.

The subject in the examples below is found in sentence-initial position, before the verb.

t̪áarák ꜜbóor-ú-∅ dɛ̀ɛl kʌ̀ ŋɪ̀ɪr.
person skin-PST-AV goat PREP knife
"The man skinned a goat with a knife."

dɛ̀ɛl bóor-út̪-ɪ̀ ŋʌ̀ t̪áarák kʌ̀ ŋɪ̀ɪr.
goat skin-PST-PV NOM person PREP knife
"The man skinned the goat with a knife." (or "The goat was skinned by the man with a knife.")

ŋɪ̀ɪr bóor-út̪-ꜜɪ́ dɛ́ɛl ŋʌ̀ t̪áarák.
knife skin-PST-CV goat NOM person
"The man skinned a goat with the knife." (or "The knife was skinned a goat with by the man.")

== Notes ==
=== Glosses ===
Here is a list of the abbreviations used in the glosses:

1	first person	def	definite	lig	ligature	rl	realis mood
2	second person	det	determiner	lv	locative voice	rv	reason voice
3	third person	dir	direct case	m	masculine	sg	singular
acc	accusative case	erg	ergative case	nav	non-actor voice	tr	transitive
an	animate	f	feminine	nmlz	nominalizer	¿?	morpheme of unknown semantics
asp	aspect	gen	genitive case	nom	nominative case
av	actor voice	gv	goal voice	obl	oblique case
aux	auxiliary verb	inan	inanimate	pl	plural
bv	benefactive voice	ind	indirect case	prep	preposition
cv	circumstantial voice	indf	indefinite	pst	past tense
d	declarative	iv	instrument voice	pv	patient voice
