= Saaroa =

Saaroa may refer to:

- Saaroa people
- Saaroa language
