= Saaroa language =

Austronesian language spoken in Taiwan

Saaroa
- kari tahlana Hlaʼaluana
- Native to: Taiwan
- Region: west central Mountains of Taiwan, south and southeast of Minchuan, along the Laonung River
- Ethnicity: 400 (2012)
- Native speakers: 10 (2012) a speaker died in 2013
- Language family: Austronesian: Tsouic ?; Saaroa–Kanakanabu; Saaroa
- Writing system: Latin (Saaroa alphabet)

Language codes
- ISO 639-3: sxr
- Glottolog: saar1237
- ELP: Saaroa
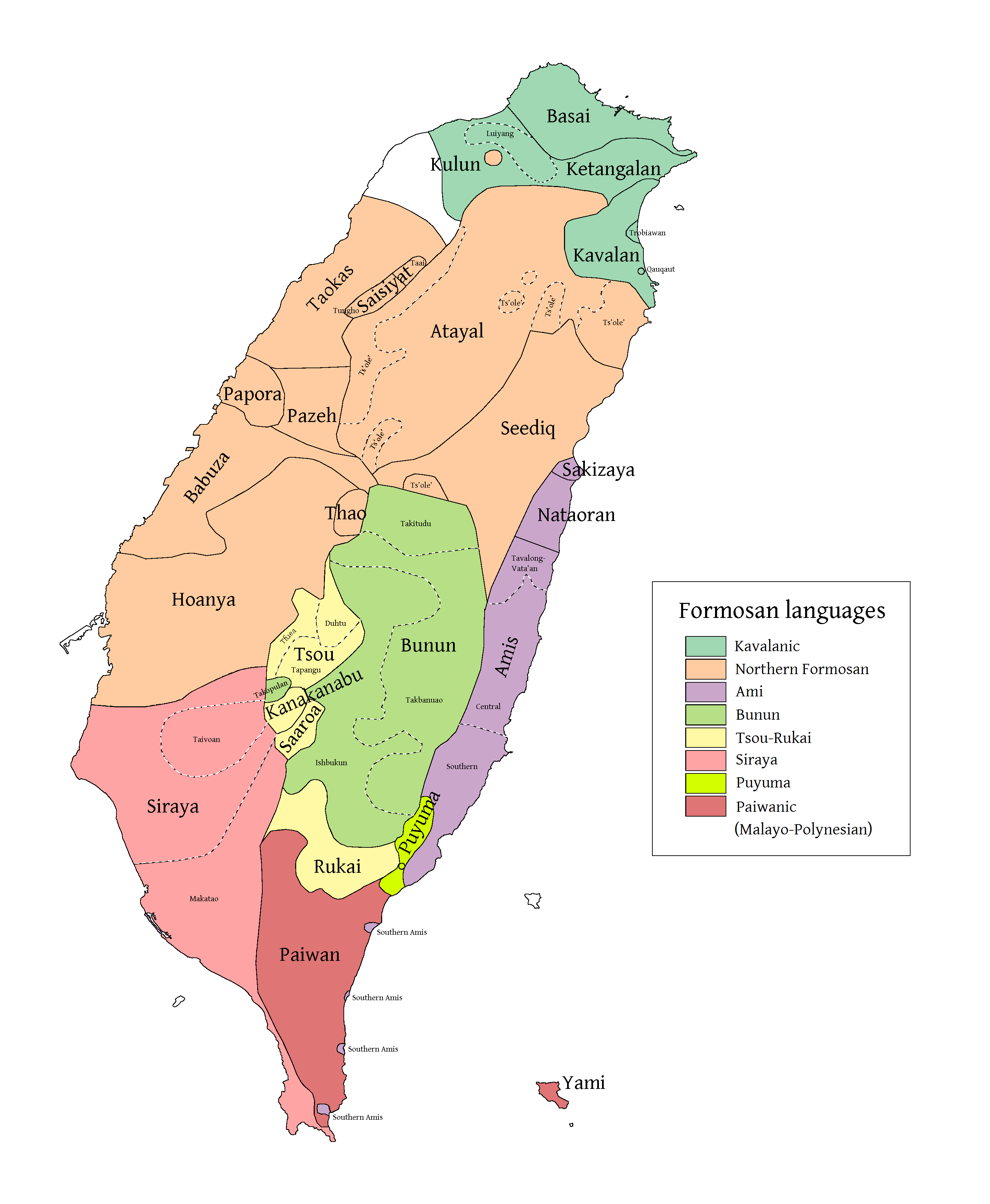

- Saaroa is classified as Critically Endangered by the UNESCO Atlas of the World's Languages in Danger

Saaroa or Hlaʼalua is a Southern Tsouic language spoken by the Saaroa (Hlaʼalua) people, an indigenous people of Taiwan. It is a Formosan language or Tsouic language of the Austronesian family.

The Saaroa live in the two villages of Taoyuan and Kaochung in Taoyuan District (Taoyuan Township), Kaohsiung City, Taiwan (Zeitoun & Teng 2014).

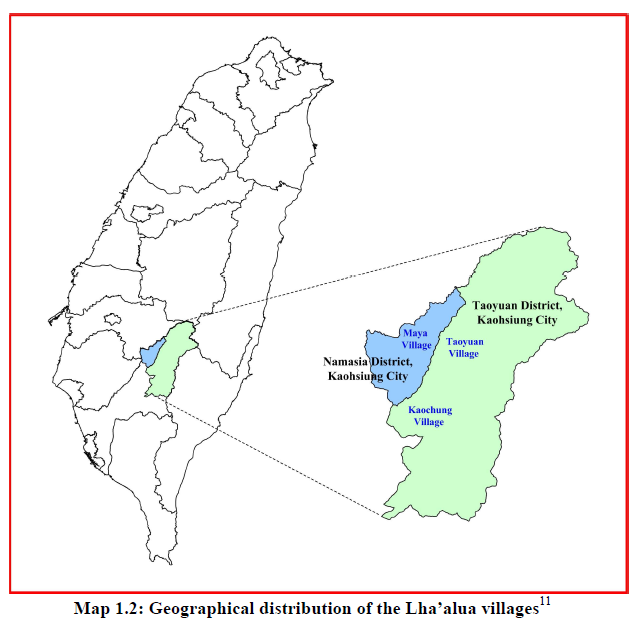
Map indicates the location where the language is still spoken

With fewer than 10 native speakers and an ethnic population of 400 people, Saaroa is considered critically endangered. Even among native speakers of the language, they use primarily Mandarin or Bunun in their daily lives. There is no longer an active speech community for Saaroa.

== Language evolution ==
When grouped according to grammar, Saaroa is most closely related to the other Formosan language Tsou and branches very early from the Proto-Formosan language that defines the grouping.

On lexical and phonographical grounds, Tsou, Kanakanabu, and Saaroa also cluster well to form the Tsouic subgroup; it is likely that the Rukai and the "Lower Three Villages Rukai" are also Tsouic languages.

The Tsouic group used to occupy a fairly large area in the southwestern parts of central Taiwan. Due to the invasion of other communities and contagious diseases, it shrank to the relatively small areas as today. The oral tradition say that the Tsouic group originated in Yushan. About 2,000 years ago, the group split into two, the Northern Tsou and Southern Tsou. Northern Tsou moved down along Nantzuhsien River to the west, while Southern Tsou moved down along Laonung River. The latter split into two, Kanakanabu and Saaroa about 800 years ago. In 1990, Saaroa was nearly extinct. Few children speak the language. The Bunun language is becoming the main language of the Saaroa people, and many of the elders in the community speak Taiwanese Hokkien. The shift to the Bunun language occurred when the Bunun migrated into the area inhabited by the Saaroa people.

Saaroa has heavily borrowed from Mantauran Rukai, since the Saaroa and Rukai peoples are geographically adjacent to each other.

== Grammatical profile ==
Saaroa has 13 consonants: /p, t, k, ʔ, s, v, ts, m, n, ŋ, r, ɾ, ɬ/, and four vowels: /i, ɨ, u, a/. The basic syllable pattern in Saaroa is (C)V, where C stands for consonants and V for vowels or long vowels. Vowels can either appear as long vowels or in clusters. Vowels in clusters make two or more syllables. There are also plenty of loan words in Saaroa, many of which were introduced during the Imperial Japanese Era (1895–1945). Apart from Japanese, words were borrowed from Mandarin Chinese, Taiwanese southern Min, and other aboriginal languages in the neighboring area, e.g. Bunun.

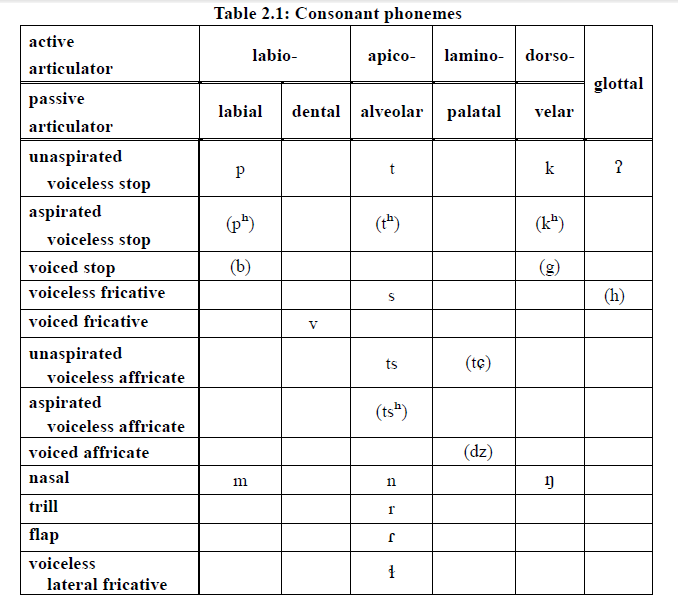
Loan phonemes are in parentheses

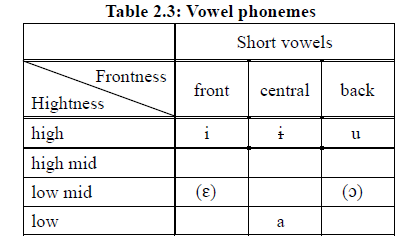
Loan phonemes are indicated in parentheses

In the past, Roman script was employed in the previous writing materials of Saaroa.

Phoneme	Orthography	Phonetic representation
p	p	[p] in all environments
t	t	[t] in all environments
k	k	[k] in all environments
ʔ	ʼ	[ʔ] in all environments
s	s	[s] in all environments, except followed by the high front unrounded vowel i; [ɕ] before the high front unrounded vowel i.
v	v	[v] in all environments, except followed by a high vowel; [β] before the high front unrounded vowel i.
ts	c	[ts] in all environments except before the high front unrounded vowel i; [tɕ] before the high front rounded vowel i.
m	m	[m] in all environments
n	n	[n] in all environments
ŋ	ng	[ŋ] in all environments
r	r	[r] in all environments
ɾ	l	[ɾ] in all environments
ɬ	lh	[ɬ] in all environments
b	b	[b] loan phoneme
p^{h}	ph	[p^{h}] loan phoneme
t^{h}	th	[t^{h}] loan phoneme
k^{h}	kh	[k^{h}] loan phoneme
ts^{h}	ch	[ts^{h}] loan phoneme
tɕ	ts	[tɕ]loan phoneme
dz	dz	[dz] loan phoneme
g	g	[g] loan phoneme
h	h	[h] loan phoneme
i	i	[i] in all environments
ɨ	ʉ	[ɨ] in all environments
u	u	[u] in all environments
a	a	[a] in all environments
ɛ	e^{19}	[ɛ] loan phoneme
ɔ	o	[ɔ] loan phoneme
Vː	VV^{20}	any long vowel written as two identical vowels

Underived roots carry the basic meaning of words typically consist of more than two syllables, in a (C)V.(C)V.(C)V pattern. Saaroa distinguishes primary stress (indicated by ˊ ) and secondary stress (indicated by ˋ). Primary stress is not contrastive, nor is secondary stress. A vowel with primary stress is characterised by higher pitch and greater intensity. Though the stressed syllable is realised with a high pitch, the difference between words does not lie in the positioning or quality of this pitch. Therefore, Saaroa should not be considered a pitch-accent language. In Saaroa, reduplication is a very productive morphological process. Exactly the same morphological process may apply to a dynamic verb and an adjectival element within a predicate. For example, when undergoing reduplication, both adjectival elements and dynamic verbs can have 'progressive', 'continuous', 'intensification' (or 'iteration'), 'diminutive' and 'collectivity' meanings.

In Saaroa, nouns are subsumed under several grammatical subclasses according to their morphological/syntactic possibilities correlating with semantic properties of their referents (i) common nouns, (ii) kinship terms, (iii) human nouns and nonhuman nouns, (iv) person names, (v) locative nouns and (vi) temporal nouns. These classes may overlap; accordingly, a noun can fall in more than one class. Similarly, verbs are subsumed under several grammatical subclasses according to the morphological/syntactic possibilities correlating with semantic properties of the referents: (i) transitivity classes, (ii) stative verbs, and (iii) adverbial verbs. All the classes may overlap; accordingly, a verb can fall into more than one class.

In Saaroa, the functional possibilities of adjectival elements typically include being modifiers to a head noun in an NP and heads of an intransitive predicate.

When it comes to word order, Saaroa is basically a predicate-initial language. The irrealis Actor Voice verb muacekehle 'will return' appears before the Subject argument kanaʼana '(s)he'. Moreover, the basic word order is Verb-Actor-Theme. For example, the nominative Actor argument of an Actor Voice Construction (e.g., mairange 'sweet potato'). Similalrly, the nominative Theme argument of a Patient Voice construction must follow the genitive Actor argument.
