= Bunun =

Bunun can refer to:

- the Bunun people of Taiwan
- the Bunun language, their Austronesian language
