= Tsouic languages =

Language family

Tsouic
- Geographic distribution: Central Taiwan
- Linguistic classification: Austronesian: Tsouic
- Proto-language: Proto-Tsouic
- Subdivisions: Tsou; Southern Tsouic

Language codes
- ISO 639-3: –
- Linguasphere: 30-EA
- Glottolog: tsou1250
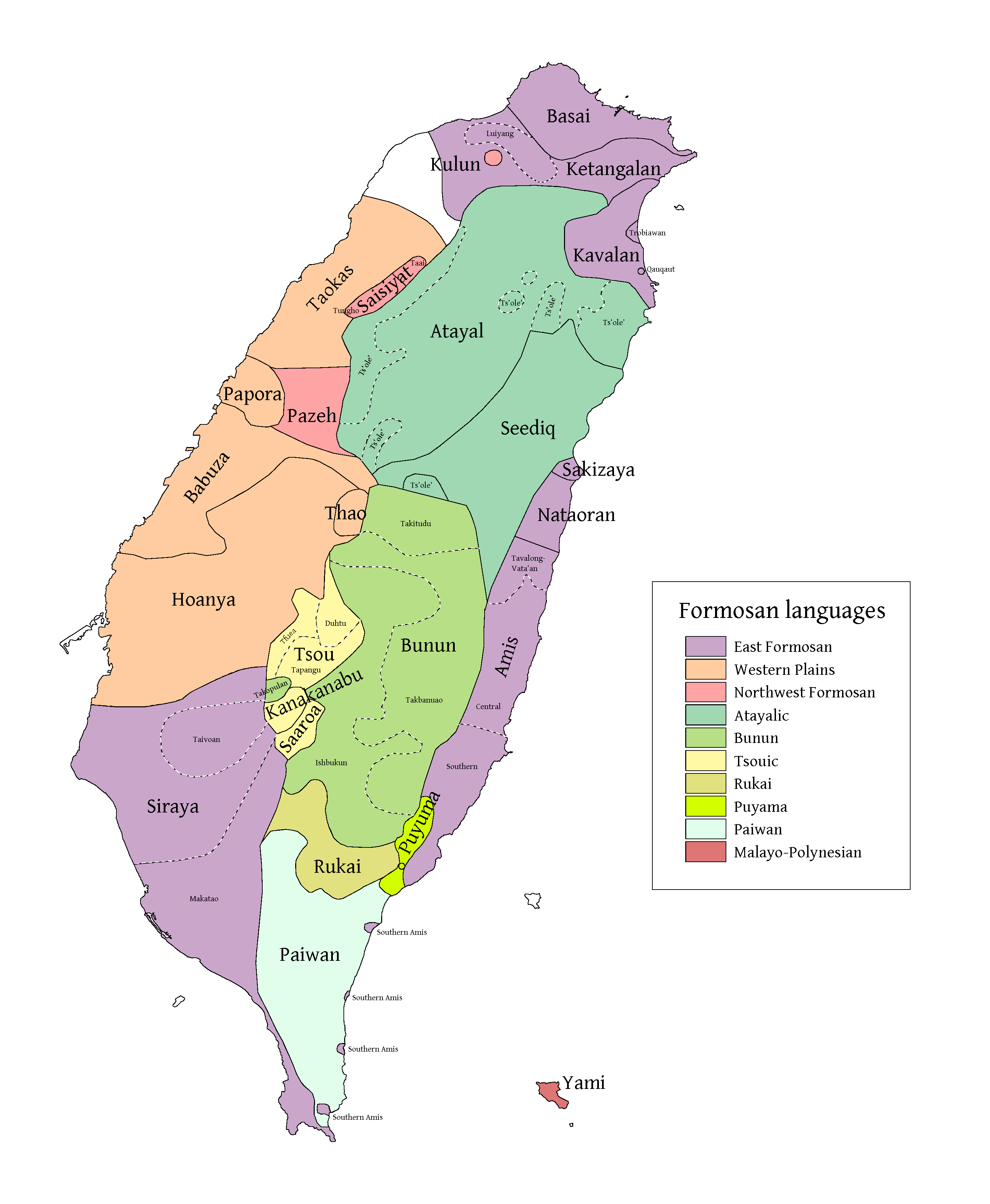
- (yellow) Greater Tsouic

The Tsouic languages (also known as the Central Formosan languages) are three Formosan languages, Tsou proper and the Southern languages Kanakanavu and Saaroa. The Southern Tsouic languages of Kanakanavu and Saaroa have the smallest phonemic inventories out of all the Formosan languages, with each language having only 13 consonants and 4 vowels (Blust 2009:165). These two languages are highly endangered, as many Southern Tsouic speakers are shifting to Bunun and Mandarin Chinese.

The Proto-Tsouic language was reconstructed by Japanese linguist Shigeru Tsuchida in 1976, and is supported by Blust (1999), Li (2008), and Sagart (2014). However, Chang (2006) and Ross (2009) deny that Tsouic is a valid group; Ross places Southern Tsouic within Nuclear Austronesian (the family of the various proto-Austronesian reconstructions), but the Tsou language as a more divergent branch.

Sagart (2014) supports Tsouic on the basis on shared irregular phonological reflexes confined to specific terms, in addition to over 57 terms reconstructed by Tsuchida that appear in no other Austronesian clade.

== Classification ==
- Tsou
- Southern Tsouic
  - Kanakanavu
  - Saaroa

== Sound changes ==
The following sound changes from Proto-Austronesian occurred in the Tsouic languages (Li 2008:215).

- *C, *d > c
- *y > Proto-Tsouic *z
- *R > r
