= Taiwan First Nations Party =

Taiwan First Nations Party 台灣第一民族黨
- Chairman: Lin Kuang-yi
- Secretary-General: Chang Chieh-hua
- Founded: 12 December 2012; 13 years ago
- Headquarters: Tainan, Taiwan
- Ideology: Indigenism; Interests of Taiwanese indigenous peoples
- County councillors: 1 / 532

Taiwan First Nations Party
- Traditional Chinese: 台灣第一民族黨
- Simplified Chinese: 台湾第一民族党
Transcriptions
Standard Mandarin
- Hanyu Pinyin: Táiwān Dìyī Mínzú Dǎng
Hakka
- Romanization: Thòi-vân Thi-yit Mìn-chhu̍k Tóng
Southern Min
- Hokkien POJ: Tâi-oân Tē-it Bîn-cho̍k Tóng

The Taiwan First Nations Party (Note: In local languages: Traditional Chinese script: 台灣第一民族黨; Mandarin Pinyin: Táiwān Dìyī Mínzú Dǎng; Hokkien: Tâi-oân Tē-it Bîn-cho̍k Tóng; Sixian Hakka: Thòi-vân Thi-yit Mìn-chhu̍k Tóng) is a minor political party in Taiwan. Formed in 2012, the aim of the party is to represent the voices and issues of Taiwanese indigenous peoples. As of 2018 they have two locally-elected representatives; Dahu Istanda, the head of Namasia District in Kaohsiung, and Shih Ching-lung, a councillor in the Nantou County Council.

== See also ==
- Indigenous Area (Taiwan)
