= Writing systems of Formosan languages =

The writing systems of the Formosan languages are a set of Latin-based orthographies used to write the indigenous Austronesian languages of Taiwan. The current orthographies were officially promulgated on 15 December 2005 by the Ministry of Education and the Council of Indigenous Peoples following several years of consultation with linguists and native speakers; 16 languages and 45 dialects are now regulated under the system.

The Formosan languages, which are toneless, typically have small phonemic inventories of roughly twenty consonants and four vowels, which makes them readily representable with a Latin-based script supplemented by a few diacritics and digraphs. Earlier attempts to write the languages date to the seventeenth century, when Dutch missionaries developed the Sinckan romanisation for Siraya and Taivoan, and continued through the post-war period when Protestant missionaries created Latin scripts for several Formosan languages to support Bible translation.

== History ==
=== Dutch missionary period ===
The earliest known written representations of any Formosan language are the Sinckan Manuscripts, a corpus of land contracts and other documents produced between roughly the mid-seventeenth and early nineteenth centuries by Siraya and Taivoan villagers using a Latin-based script that Dutch Reformed Church missionaries had introduced during the period of Dutch rule from 1624 to 1662. The Siraya continued to use the script for legal and administrative purposes for more than a century after the Dutch had been expelled by Koxinga in 1662, with the latest surviving Sinckan land deeds dated to the early 1800s.

=== Post-war missionary period ===
After the handover of Taiwan to the Republic of China in 1945 and during the political restrictions of the martial law period, Protestant missionary translators developed Latin-based scripts for Bunun, Paiwan, Taroko, Atayal and Amis to support Bible translation into the Formosan languages. These scripts were broadly similar in approach to the missionary-developed Pe̍h-ōe-jī orthography used for Taiwanese Hokkien and Pha̍k-fa-sṳ for Taiwanese Hakka, both of which had been developed by Western Presbyterian missionaries in the nineteenth century.

In 1992 the Ministry of Education commissioned the linguist Li Jen-kuei (李壬癸) of Academia Sinica to compile a unified set of romanisations for the Formosan languages; Li's system, implemented in 1994, formed the foundation for the later 2005 standardisation.

=== 2005 standardisation ===
A series of public meetings convened from 2003 onward brought together linguists and native speakers to address the lack of consistency among the various missionary, scholarly and community-developed orthographies in use at the time. These consultations led to the joint promulgation by the Ministry of Education and the Council of Indigenous Peoples, on 15 December 2005, of a standardised set of orthographic conventions for the 12 then-recognised Formosan languages and their 42 dialects. The standard did not impose a single unified orthography across all dialects; instead, separate but parallel conventions were adopted for each dialect, in recognition of the substantial pre-existing literacy traditions established by churches and earlier linguistic studies.

=== Post-2017 revisions ===
Since 2016, the Indigenous Languages Research and Development Center (原住民族語言研究發展中心) has coordinated a continuing review of the 2005 system, with proposals submitted by individual language communities and reviewed in successive reports published in 2016, 2017 and 2018. The number of officially recognised Formosan languages was expanded from 12 to 16 over this period, and the count of regulated dialects grew correspondingly from 42 to 45.

== Relationship to other Taiwan romanizations ==
The Formosan-language orthographies belong to a broader family of Latin-based writing systems that have been developed for the languages of Taiwan since the nineteenth century. The most widely used non-Formosan romanisations are Pe̍h-ōe-jī (POJ), developed by Presbyterian missionaries for Taiwanese Hokkien and popularised through Thomas Barclay's Taiwan Church News from 1885 onward, and Pha̍k-fa-sṳ, a parallel system for Taiwanese Hakka. In October 2006 the Ministry of Education promulgated a unified Taiwanese Romanization System (Tâi-uân Lô-má-jī Phing-im Hong-àn, often abbreviated Tâi-lô) for Taiwanese Hokkien, derived from POJ and the older Taiwanese Language Phonetic Alphabet (TLPA).

Unlike POJ and Pha̍k-fa-sṳ, which use diacritics to mark tone, the Formosan orthographies do not require tone marking because the Formosan languages are non-tonal; they typically use diacritics only to distinguish vowel length or central vowels where the basic five-vowel Latin set is insufficient.

== Orthographies ==
The table shows how the letters and symbols are used to denote sounds in the 16 officially recognised Formosan languages.

	a	ae	b	c	d	dh	dj	dr	e	é	f	g	h	hl	i	ɨ	j	k	l	lh	lj	lr	m	n	ng	o	oe	p	q	R	r	ṟ	S	s	sh	t	th	tj	tr	u	ʉ	v	w	x	y	z	'	^
Amis	a			t͡s	d, ð, ɬ				e		b, f, v		ħ		i			k	ɾ				m	n	ŋ	o		p			r			s		t				u			w	x	j		ʡ	ʔ
Atayal	a		β, v	t͡s					e			ɣ	h		i			k	l				m	n	ŋ	o		p	q		r	ɾ		s		t				u			w	x	j	z	ʔ	
Bunun	a		b	t͡s, t͡ɕ	d				e, ə				x, χ		i			k	l, ɬ				m	n	ŋ	o		p	q					s		t				u		v				ð	ʔ	
Kanakanavu	a			t͡s					e						i			k					m	n	ŋ	o		p			ɾ			s		t				u	ɨ	v					ʔ	
Kavalan	a		b		ɮ				ə				h		i			k	ɾ				m	n	ŋ	o		p	q	ʁ				s		t				u			w		j	z	ʔ	
Paiwan	a		b	t͡s	d		ɟ	ɖ	e			g	h		i			k	ɭ		ʎ		m	n	ŋ			p	q		r			s		t		c		u		v	w		j	z	ʔ	
Puyuma	a		b	t͡s	d			ɖ	ə			g	h		i			k	ɭ			ɮ	m	n	ŋ			p			r			s		t			ʈ	u		v	w		j	z	ʔ	
Rukai	a		b	t͡s	d	ð		ɖ	ə	e		g	h		i	ɨ		k	l			ɭ	m	n	ŋ	o		p			r			s		t	θ		ʈ	u		v	w		j	z	ʔ	
Saaroa	a			t͡s										ɬ	i			k	ɾ				m	n	ŋ			p			r			s		t				u	ɨ	v					ʔ	
Saisiyat	a	æ	β						ə				h		i			k	l				m	n	ŋ	o	œ	p			r		ʃ	s, θ		t							w		j	z, ð	ʔ	
Sakizaya	a		b	t͡s	d, ð, ɬ				ə				ħ		i			k	ɾ				m	n	ŋ	o		p						s		t				u			w		j	z	ʡ	
Seediq	a		b	t͡s	d				e, ə			g	ħ		i		ɟ	k	l				m	n	ŋ	o		p	q		r			s		t				u			w	x	j			
Taroko	a		b	t͡ɕ	d				ə			ɣ	ħ		i		ɟ	k	ɮ				m	n	ŋ	o		p	q		ɾ			s		t				u			w	x	j			
Thao	a		b		d						ɸ		h		i			k	l	ɬ			m	n	ŋ			p	q		r			s	ʃ	t	θ			u			β, w		j	ð	ʔ	
Tsou	a		ɓ	t͡s					e		f		x		i			k	ɗ				m	n	ŋ	o		p						s		t				u		v		ɨ	j	z	ʔ	
Yami	a		b	t͡s, t͡ɕ	ɖ				ə			g	ɰ		i		d͡ʒ, d͡ʝ	k	l				m	n	ŋ	o, u		p			ɻ			ʂ		t						f	w		j	r	ʔ	

== Spelling rules ==
Beyond the inventory of letters and digraphs, the 2005 standard establishes several conventions that govern how the orthographies are written in practice. The conventions are language-specific but share a number of features across the system.

=== Digraphs and disambiguation ===
Many phonemes that do not have a dedicated Latin letter are written with digraphs: ‹ng› represents the velar nasal /ŋ/, ‹dj› and ‹tj› the palatal stops /ɟ/ and /c/, ‹dr› and ‹tr› the retroflex stops /ɖ/ and /ʈ/, ‹lj› the palatal lateral /ʎ/, ‹lh› and ‹hl› the voiceless lateral fricative /ɬ/ in different languages, and ‹th›, ‹sh› and ‹dh› various dental and retracted sibilants depending on the language. Where two adjacent letters could be read either as a digraph or as a sequence of two separate phonemes, the sequence is disambiguated by an underscore: ‹n_g› indicates the sequence /n/ followed by /ɡ/ rather than the velar nasal /ŋ/ that ‹ng› represents.

=== Glottal stop ===
The glottal stop /ʔ/ has been written variously in the missionary and pre-2005 traditions, including with ‹'› (apostrophe), ‹^›, ‹h›, ‹q›, or by omission. The 2005 standard fixes the apostrophe ‹'› as the default representation, with ‹^› reserved in Amis and Sakizaya for the epiglottal stop /ʡ/, a sound that contrasts with the ordinary glottal stop in those languages. Subsequent revisions have moved toward eliminating the ‹^› grapheme in Sakizaya and using a single ‹'› for both the glottal and epiglottal articulations.

=== Vowel conventions ===
The Formosan languages typically have small vowel inventories of around four vowels, generally /a, i, u/ plus one of /e/ or /ə/ (often both, written ‹e› and ‹é› or distinguished by language). Where a language treats the mid back vowel [o] and the high back vowel [u] as free variants of a single phoneme, the 2005 standard nonetheless retains both letters ‹o› and ‹u› in the orthography in order to reflect the phonetic distinction that survives in grammatical particles and to match speakers' linguistic intuitions. Languages with a high central vowel /ɨ/ write it as ‹ɨ› or, in revisions adopted by Hla'alua and Kanakanavu, as ‹ʉ›.

=== Stress and word division ===
Lexical stress is generally not marked in the orthography because most Formosan languages have predictable, phonemic stress patterns; the major exception is Bunun, in which the Nantou variety places stress on the ultimate syllable rather than the penultimate syllable found in other varieties, and the acute accent ‹´› is used to mark non-default stress where necessary. The acute accent is omitted at morpheme boundaries where it would conflict with morpheme recognition: for example, the imperative form of ta-aza ("listen to"), formed by suffixing -a, is written ta-azaa rather than ta-azá to preserve the morpheme boundary visually.

The hyphen is used in several languages to separate morphemes within a word, particularly in reduplication, affixation and compound formation, allowing the reader to identify the constituent parts of agglutinative forms.

=== Capitalisation and punctuation ===
Punctuation broadly follows the conventions of English and other Latin-alphabet writing systems: sentences begin with a capital letter, proper nouns are capitalised, and the standard inventory of full stop, comma, question mark and quotation marks is used. The Council of Indigenous Peoples issued a formal set of punctuation principles in 2014 to standardise punctuation usage across the Formosan-language orthographies.

=== Loanwords ===
Loanwords, particularly those drawn from Mandarin Chinese, Japanese and Taiwanese Hokkien, are typically respelled to conform to the phonotactics of the host Formosan language, although the 2016-2018 revision process accepted that certain additional letters and digraphs may be retained in loanwords only, without otherwise expanding the regular orthographic inventory of the language.

== Revisions ==
Revision of the alphabets has been under continuous discussion since 2016. The table below summarises the proposals and decisions made by the indigenous language communities and linguists during the 2016-2018 review process. Symbols enclosed with angle brackets ‹› are letters, while those enclosed with square brackets [] are from the International Phonetic Alphabet. The names of dialects are written in Chinese.

Language	Proposal	2017 Decision	Final Decision
Amis	1. Amis, Sakizaya use ‹^› for glottal stop [ʔ] and ‹’› for epiglottal stop [ʡ], while other languages use ‹’› for glottal stop 2. ‹u› and ‹o› seem to be allophones 3. 馬蘭: add ‹i’› for [ε]: 4. 南勢: change ‹f› to ‹b›	1. Continue to use the standard 2. Advised to use only ‹u› or ‹o›; 3. Rejected; 4. Accepted	
Atayal	1. 賽考利克, 四季: add ‹f›; 萬大: add ‹z›; 2. The use of ‹_› to: (1) separate ‹n› and ‹g› sequence from ‹ng›, (2) represent reduced vowel 3. 萬大, 宜蘭澤敖利: delete ‹q›	1. Rejected; 2. Continue to use the standard 3. Accepted	
Paiwan	1. 中排, 南排: use ‹gr› in place of ‹dr›; 2. Inconsistent use of ‹w› and ‹v›	1. To be discussed; 力里 needs a letter for [ɣ]; 2. To be discussed	
Bunun	1. Add vowels ‹e› and ‹o›; 2. 郡群: ‹ti› changes to ‹ci› (palatalization); 3. 郡群: ‹si› (palatalization); 4. 郡群 uses ‹-› for glottal stop 5. The loss of [ʔ] may cause ‹y› become a phoneme	1. Accepted; 2. To be discussed 3. Remain ‹si›; 4. Remain ‹-›	
Puyuma	1. 知本, 初鹿, 建和: add ‹b›; 2. 建和: add ‹z›; 3. 知本: add ‹dr›; 4. 南王: delete ‹’› and ‹h›; 5. 知本, 初鹿, 建和, 南王: add ‹o› and ‹ē›; 6. The original practice of using ‹l› for retroflex [ɭ] and ‹lr› for [ɮ] (which is [l] in南王) is confusing.; It is suggested to use ‹lr› [ɭ], ‹lh› [ɮ], ‹l› [l]	1. Only in loanwords 2. Only in loanwords 3. Advised not to add 4. Delete ‹h›; 5. Only in loanwords 6. Can't reach agreement 7. Delete ‹’› and use ‹q› for [ʔ] and [ɦ]	
Rukai	1. 大武: add ‹tr›; 2. 萬山: add ‹b› and ‹g›; 3. 霧台: add ‹é›; 4. 多納: Use ‹u› in place of ‹o›	1. Only in loanwords 2. Only in loanwords 3. Only in loanwords 4. Accepted	
Saisiyat	1. Long vowel sign ‹:›; 2. Add ‹c, f, g›	1. Delete; 2. To be discussed	
Tsou	1. Delete ‹r› for [ɽ]; 2. Use ‹x› for vowel ‹ʉ› for convenience 3. Add ‹g›; 4. ‹l› has two sounds: [ɗ] and [l]	1. Reserve the letter for 久美; 2. Accepted; 3. Only in loanwords 4. To be studied	
Yami	1. Churches use ‹h› for both [ʔ] and [ɰ]	1. ‹’› should be used for [ʔ]	
Thao	1. ‹.› should be used to distinguish ‹lh› (vs. ‹l.h›) and ‹th› (vs. ‹t.h›)	1. Continue to use the standard 2. Add ‹aa, ii, uu›	
Kavalan	1. The confusion of ‹o› and ‹u›; 2. Add trill ‹r› for 樟原	1. Add ‹o› to distinguish from ‹u›; 2. People from the tribe decided not to add 3. Add ‹y, w›	
Taroko	1. Add ‹’›; 2. Add ‹aw, ay, uy, ow, ey›; 3. Reduced vowel ‹e› should not be omitted	1. To be discussed 2. Add ‹ey› [e]; 3. People from the tribe wish not to change the current spelling rules	
Seediq	1. 都達、德路固: add ‹aw, ay, uy, ow, ey›; 2. Add ‹j›; 3. ‹w› should not be omitted 4. Reduced vowel ‹e› should not be omitted	1. Add ‹ey› [e]; ‹aw, ay, uy› added only in loanwords 2. Only in loanwords 3. People from the tribe wish not to change the current spelling rules 4. People from the tribe wish not to change the current spelling rules	
Sakizaya	1. Delete ‹^› for epiglottal stop 2. Loss of distinction between ‹x› and ‹h›; 3. ‹l›, ‹r› seem to be allophones	1. Accepted; use ‹’› for [ʔ] and [ʡ]; 2. Delete ‹x› and keep ‹h›; 3. To be discussed 4. Use ‹b› [b] in place of ‹f›	
Hla’alua	1. Add ‹ʉ› for [ɨ]; 2. Delete central vowel ‹e› [ə]	1. Accepted; 2. Accepted; 3. Remain ‹r› for [r] and ‹l› for [ɾ]	
Kanakanavu	1. Change ‹e› [ə] to ‹e› [e]; 2. Add ‹ʉ› for [ɨ]; 3. Delete ‹l›	1. Accepted; 2. Accepted; 3. Delete ‹l› and use ‹r› for [r, ɾ]	

== See also ==
- Formosan languages
- Indigenous peoples of Taiwan
- Languages of Taiwan
- Pe̍h-ōe-jī
- Pha̍k-fa-sṳ
- Sinckan Manuscripts
- Taiwanese Romanization System
