= Saaroa people =

Hla'alua people
Hla'alua
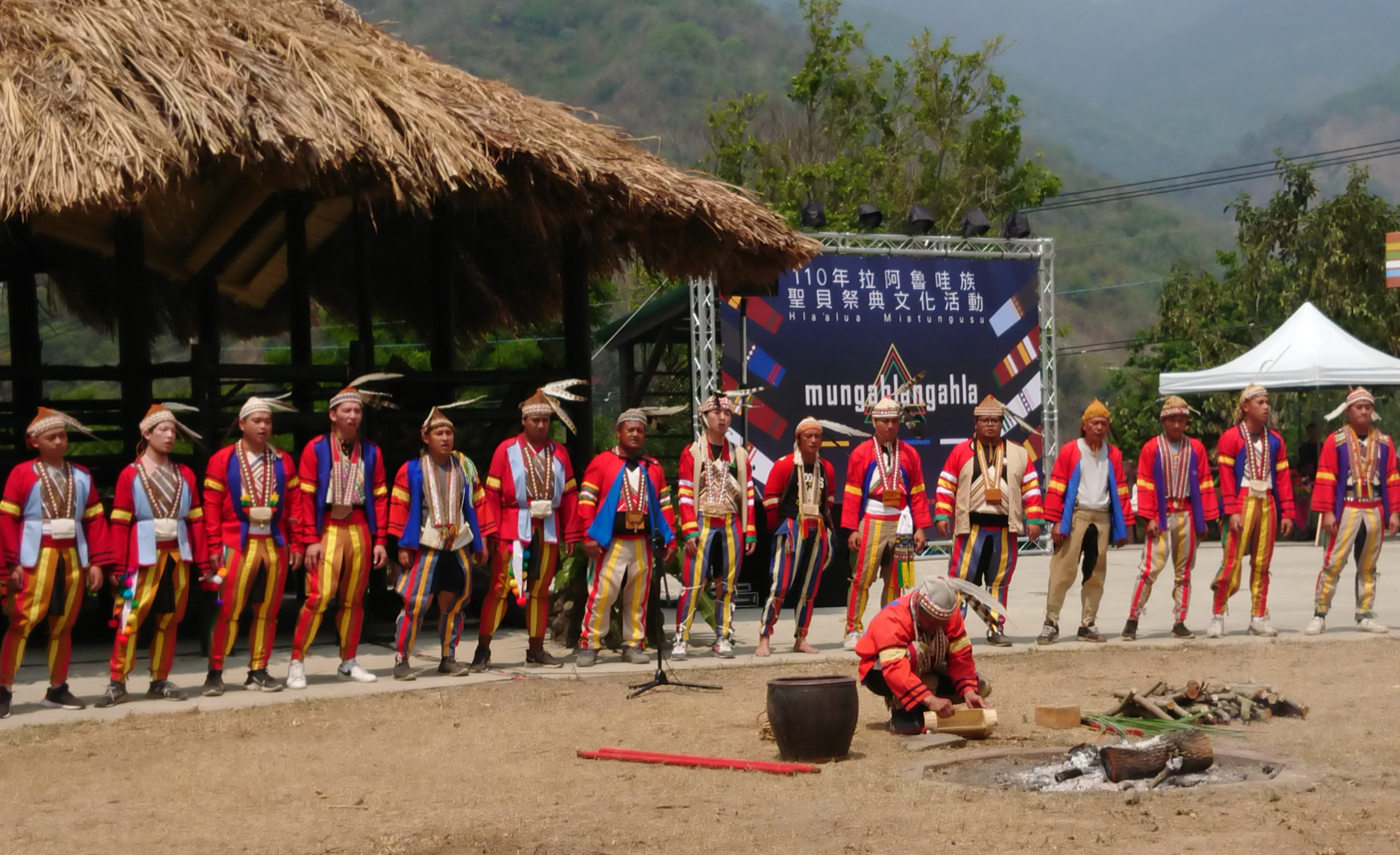
- Miatungusu festival of the Hla'arua people.

Total population
- 477 (Jul 2024)

Languages
- Saaroa, Bunun, Mandarin, Taiwanese Hokkien, Japanese

Related ethnic groups
- Tsou, Kanakanavu, Bunun, Taiwanese indigenous people

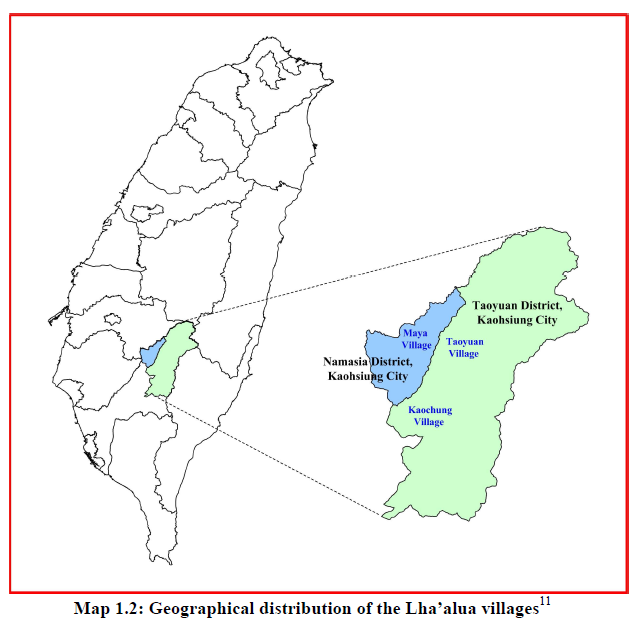
The location of Saaroa villages

The Saaroa or Hla'alua people (Chinese: 拉阿魯哇族) are an indigenous people of central southern Taiwan. They live in the two villages of Taoyuan and Kaochung in Taoyuan District, Kaohsiung and Maya Village in Namasia District, Kaohsiung.

The group attained official recognition from the Taiwanese government on 26 June 2014 under the name Hla'alua as the 15th indigenous people of Taiwan. Previously, the group as considered as subgroup of the Tsou people.

== Clothes ==
The Hla'alua tribe excels in hunting and tanning, developing leather crafts and products, and making leather clothing, and leather hats as a staple in men's attire. The formal dress for men includes a red long-sleeved top with a chest cover, a black short skirt, and a goat-skin hat. Women braid their hair with a scarf, wear a hat adorned with rooster feathers, and dress in a black skirt with a blue or white long-sleeved top featuring cross-stitch embroidery on the front panel. Other handicrafts, mostly practical items for daily life, hunting, rituals, and children's toys, are also prominent.

Traditional gentlemen's attire includes shirts, hats, and pants made of goat or deer leather. The Hla'alua tribe embeds seashells on the front of leather hats and sews on five feathers (two eagle feathers on each side and a white tail feather from a Mikado pheasant in the center). Today, a red fabric top with tricolor stripes of yellow, green, white, green, and yellow on the back symbolizes family and tribal commitment.

Women braid their hair with traditional scarves and wear hats adorned with rooster feathers. They wear black skirts with a blue or white long-sleeved top, and the women from Fliplara Village in Taoyuan often wear blue tops, while those from the communities of Paisiana, Talisia, and Bilangan in Gaozhong frequently opt for white tops. According to legend, they create hats with rooster feathers to commemorate the rooster and wear them to assist the tribe in negotiating with the sun.

== See also ==
- Saaroa language
- Taiwanese indigenous peoples
