= Kanakanavu people =

Kanakanavu
卡那卡那富
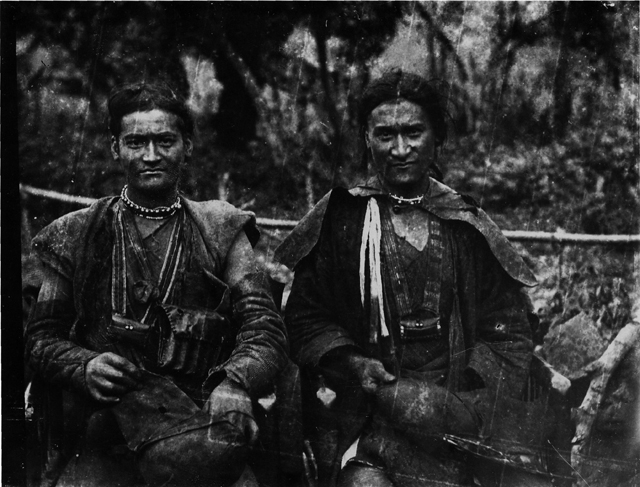

Total population
- ~414 (March 2023)

Regions with significant populations
- Taiwan

Languages
- Kanakanavu, Bunun, Mandarin, Taiwanese Hokkien

Religion
- Animism, Christianity (majority)

Related ethnic groups
- Tsou, Bunun, Saaroa, Taiwanese Aborigines

The Kanakanavu (Chinese: 卡那卡那富族; Wade–Giles: Kanakanavu) are an indigenous people of central southern Taiwan. They live in the two villages of Manga and Takanua in Namasia District, Kaohsiung City, Taiwan.

== History ==
The native Kanakanavu speakers were Taiwanese aboriginals living on the islands. Following the Dutch Colonial Period in the 17th century, Han-Chinese immigration began to dominate the islands population. The village of Takanua is a village assembled by Japanese rulers to relocate various aboriginal groups in order to establish easier dominion over these groups.

On 26 June 2014, the government recognized Kanakanavu as the 16th group of Taiwanese indigenous peoples.

=== Livelihood ===
Japanese occupation left evidence of how the culture functioned. Forest clearance allowed agriculture to be the main facet of society, followed by hunting and fishing. Maize, Rice, Millet, Taro, Sweet Potatoes, beans, and soybeans were the staple crops.

=== Spirituality ===
Kanakanavu practiced a polytheistic nature religion involving offerings, fertility rituals, and shamanism. Headhunting was a common practice until Christianization took over.

== Clothing ==
The traditional attire of the Kanakanavu people encompassed a leather hat and vest crafted from furry deer skin, exposing the chest. Over time, increased trade and interactions with other communities prompted a shift to linen and cotton garments, once the privilege of the affluent. The ensemble is complemented by a range of accessories, such as earrings, wrist ornaments, leather shoes, hunting bags, and headdresses, particularly favored by males.

Men from the tribe commonly don a linen-based red corset suspended diagonally from the nape of the neck, featuring a pouch for personal items or tools. Geometric patterns, woven in hues of blue, black, or yellow, adorn the upper section of the corset. The lower body is draped with a rectangular short skirt fashioned from overlapping black cotton layers, secured with a bamboo belt. This belt traditionally accentuates chest muscles, symbolizing prowess in combat or hunting. Signifying social status and achievement, long feathers from eagles and blue-bellied pheasants are integral to their attire, with young males displaying one to four feathers, while elders boast from five to eight.

Traditionally, women's attire comprised leather, evolving with changing techniques and trade dynamics to include cotton, silk, or satin for the affluent and linen for others. The upper body is cloaked in a lengthy short top secured with a tied strap at the back or wrapped around the waist. A vibrant array of colors—red, yellow, blue, black, green, and purple—is intricately embroidered on the collar, front edge, hem, and cuffs of the jacket. Completing the ensemble is a black long skirt elegantly draped from left to right around the lower body, tied with a belt. This red or green belt was usually made of cotton or silk and decorated with embroidered patterns. Women could also wear accessories such as earrings, neck ornaments, headscarf, hats decorated with colorful garlands or knee pants during events or ceremonies.

== See also ==
- Kanakanavu language
- Taiwanese indigenous peoples
