= Kanakanavu language =

Austronesian language spoken in Taiwan

Kanakanavu
- kari Kanakanavu
- Native to: Taiwan
- Region: Maya Village, Namasia District, Kaohsiung City
- Ethnicity: 360 (2020)
- Native speakers: 4 (2012)
- Language family: Austronesian: Tsouic ?; Saaroa–Kanakanabu; Kanakanavu
- Writing system: Latin (Kanakanavu alphabet)

Language codes
- ISO 639-3: xnb
- Glottolog: kana1286
- ELP: Kanakanavu
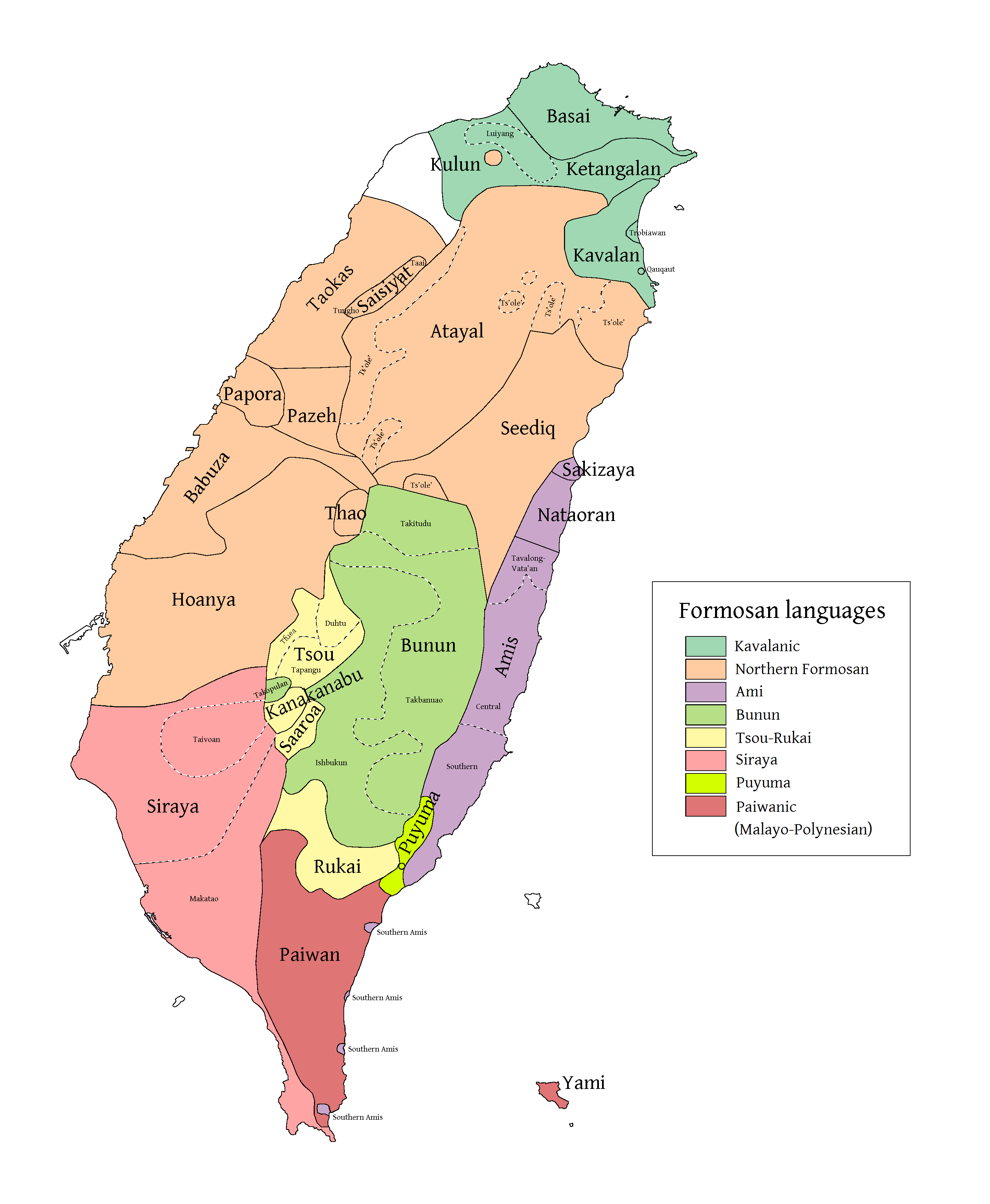

- Kanakanavu is classified as Critically Endangered by the UNESCO Atlas of the World's Languages in Danger

Kanakanavu (also spelled Kanakanabu) is a Southern Tsouic language spoken by the Kanakanavu people, an indigenous people of Taiwan (see Taiwanese indigenous peoples). It is a Tsouic language of the Austronesian family.

The Kanakanavu live in the two villages of Manga and Takanua in Namasia District (formerly Sanmin Township), Kaohsiung.

The language is moribund, with only 4 speakers (2012 census).

== History ==
The native Kanakanavu speakers were Taiwanese indigenous peoples living on the islands. Following the Dutch Colonial Period in the 17th century, Han-Chinese immigration began to dominate the islands population. The village of Takanua is a village assembled by Japanese rulers to relocate various indigenous groups in order to establish easier dominion over these groups.

== Phonology ==
There are 14 different consonant phonemes, containing only voiceless plosives within Kanakanavu. Adequate descriptions of liquid consonants become a challenge within Kanakanavu. It also contains 6 vowels; phonetic diphthongs and triphthongs occur where vowels are adjacent. Vowel length is often not clear if distinctive or not, as well as speakers pronouncing vowel phonemes with variance. As most Austronesian and Formosan languages, Kanakanavu has a CV syllable structure (where C = consonant, V = vowel). Very few, even simple words, contain less than three to four syllables.

=== Consonants ===
Kanakanavu consonants
		Labial	Alveolar	Retroflex	Palatal	Velar	Glottal
Nasal		m	n			ŋ	
Plosive		p	t			k	ʔ
Affricate			t͜s				
Fricative	voiceless	(f)	s				(h)
Fricative	voiced	v					
Rhotic			ɾ	ɽ			
Approximant					j	w	

/s/ is pronounced [ʃ] before /i/ and /t͜s/ is pronounced [t͜ʃ] before /i/ and /ʉ/.

=== Vowels ===
Vowels
	Front	Central	Back
Close	i	ɨ~ʉ	u
Mid	e		o
Open		a	

== Orthography ==
Several texts have been transcribed by outsiders in the orthography of the Council of Indigenous Peoples of Taiwan, and a dictionary is available. ⟨C⟩ is used for /t͜s/, ⟨ng⟩ for /ŋ/, ⟨r⟩ and ⟨l⟩ for /ɾ/ and /ɽ/, ⟨ꞌ⟩ for /ʔ/, and ⟨ʉ⟩ for the central vowel.
