= Tsou language =

Austronesian language of Taiwan

Tsou
- eʼe no cou
- Native to: Taiwan
- Region: Alishan
- Ethnicity: Tsou
- Native speakers: 4,100 (2015)
- Language family: Austronesian: Tsouic ?; Tsou
- Dialects: Tapangʉ; Tfuya; Duhtu †; Iimcu †
- Writing system: Latin (Tsou alphabet)

Language codes
- ISO 639-3: tsu
- Glottolog: tsou1248
- ELP: Tsou
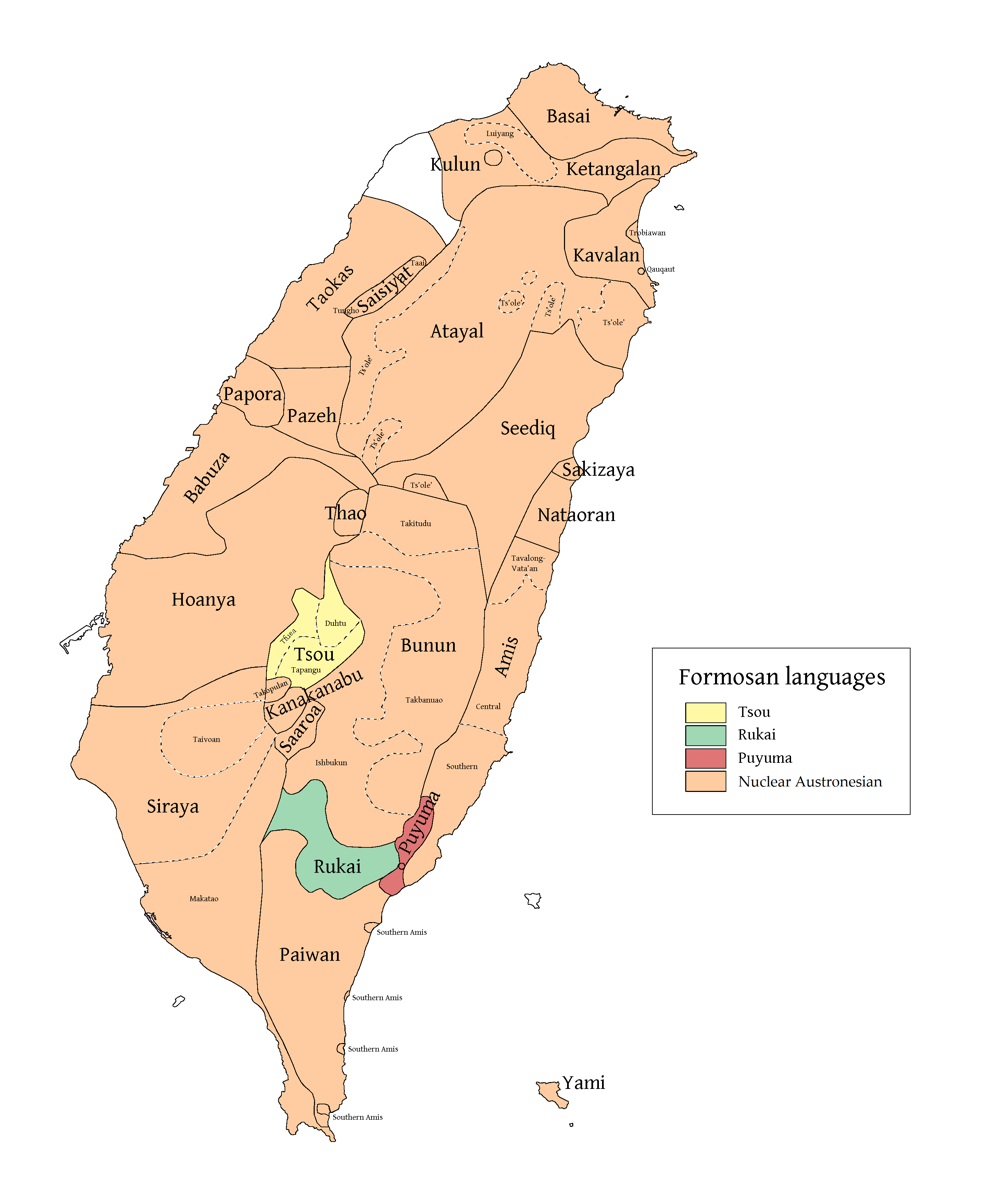
- (yellow) Tsou

- Tsou is classified as Definitely endangered by the UNESCO Atlas of the World's Languages in Danger

Tsou (/(t)soʊ/, (T)SOH; Tsou: Cou) is an Austronesian language spoken by the Tsou people of Taiwan. Tsou-speakers are located in the west-central mountains southeast of the Alishan area in southern Taiwan.

== Name ==
The name Tsou literally means "person", from Proto-Austronesian *Cau through regular sound changes. It is therefore cognate with the name of the Thao.

== Classification ==
Tsou has traditionally been considered part of a Tsouic branch of Austronesian. However, several recent classifications, such as Chang (2006) and Ross (2009) dispute the Tsouic branch, with Tsou more divergent than the other two languages, Kanakanabu and Saaroa.

== Dialects ==
Tsou does not have much dialectal variation. There are four recorded dialects: Tapangʉ, Tfuya, Duhtu and Iimcu, of which Tapangʉ and Tfuya are still spoken. Iimcu has not been well described. The grammar of the other three dialects is nearly identical, and phonological variation is marginal: In certain environments, Tapangʉ /i/ corresponds to Tfuya and Duhtu /z/ or /iz/, and Duhtu had /r/ for Tfuya and Tapangʉ /j/ (Actually, older speakers had been recorded to vary between [ɹ] and [j], but at that point the dialect was moribund.).

Tsou is spoken in the following villages:} All of the villages are located in Alishan Township, Chiayi County except for Mamahavana (Jiumei), which is located in Hsinyi/Xinyi Township, Nantou County. Both the native Tsou names and Chinese names are given.

Tapangʉ (Tapaŋʉ)

- Tapangʉ 達邦 (Dabang)
- Niaʼucna/Nibiei 里佳 (Lijia)
- Saviki 山美 (Shanmei)
- Sinvi 新美 (Xinmei)

Tfuya (Tfuya)

- Cayamavana 茶山 (Chashan)
- Dadauya 樂野 (Leye)
- Ranguu/Pnguu/Dadangia 來吉 (Laiji)

Duhtu (Luhtu) - extinct

- Mamahavana 久美 (Jiumei)

Iimucu – extinct

== Phonology ==
The description of Tsou phonology below is from Wright & Ladefoged (1994).

=== Vowels ===
Tsou has six vowels, /i ɨ u e o ɑ/. Vowel sequences occur, including sequences of like vowels (/ii/ /uu/ /ee/ etc.), but these are separate moras rather than long vowels or diphthongs. Vowels, especially back vowels, are centralized when flanked by voiceless alveolar consonants (/t, ts, s/). This may involve a central offglide, so that /o/ is pronounced as a diphthong [öə̯] or [ɵə̯] in this environment. The sound /ɨ/ ~ /ʉ/ has been written <x>, one of the only cases in the world of <x> representing a vowel.

=== Consonants ===
Tsou consonants
		Labial	Alveolar	Velar	Glottal
Nasal		m	n	ŋ	
Plosive	voiceless	p	t	k	ʔ
Plosive	implosive	ɓ	ɗ ~ ˀl		
Affricate			ts ~ tʃ		
Fricative	voiceless	f	s ~ ʃ	h	
Fricative	voiced	v	z ~ ʒ		
Approximant		w	ɹ ~ j		

The approximants /w/ and /j/ may surface as non-syllabic mid vowels [e̯] and [o̯], even (for /j/) in initial position (/jo~joskɨ/ [e̯oˈe̯oskɨ] "fishes"; /w/ does not occur in initial position), explaining the spelling Tfuea (/tfuja/) for the name of the dialect. However, stress assignment ([ˈtfue̯a]) and restrictions on consonant clusters (see stress and phonotactics below) demonstrate that they behave as consonants.

The plosives are not aspirated. Phonetically aspirated stops are actually sequences of stop plus /h/, as can be seen by the fact that they cannot cluster with a third consonant (see phonotactics below), and by morphological alternations such as /phini/ ~ /mhini/ "to trade".

According to spectrum analysis, /h/ appears to be a glottal fricative in most environments, but approaches a velar [x] next to the central vowel /ɨ/, as in /tsaphɨ/ 'palm, sole'. However, the fact that the sequences /hʔ/ and /ʔh/ occur, when no other homorganic sequence is allowed, suggests that /h/ and /ʔ/ may not both be glottal. (Additional evidence that /h/ might best be analyzed as velar is the fact that */kh/ is not found, and that /hk/ is only found medially, in the single known word /kuhku/ "fox".)

The voiceless sibilants, /ts/ and /s/, are palatalized to [tʃ] and [ʃ] before the front vowels /i/ and /e/. However, the voiced sibilant /z/ is not affected by this environment.

The implosives /ɓ/ and /ɗ/ are uncommon. Both may be glottalized ([ʔɓ], [ʔɗ] or maybe [ʔb], [ʔd]) in intervocalic position. In addition, alveolar /ɗ/ has some unusual allophony: About a third of speakers pronounce it with a lateral release, or before /a/ as a lateral approximant [l], as in /ɗauja/ [lauja] "maple". Indeed, Tsuchida transcribed it as a preglottalized lateral, [ˀl].

=== Stress ===
With a few exceptions, stress is not only predictable, but shifts when suffixes are added to a word. It falls on the penultimate vowel, or on the penultimate mora if a moraic analysis is adopted. That is, a final heavy syllable (double vowel) receives stress ([eˈmoo] "house"); otherwise, stress falls on the penultimate syllable ([oˈkosi] "his child"). Additional stress falls in a trochaic pattern: Every other light syllable (single vowel) also receives stress. Unstressed vowels are deleted, except at word boundaries (initial or final vowel) and unless doing so would create a forbidden consonant cluster (see below).

For example, the verb ⫽seʔe-nətəh-a⫽ "to cut with a bolo" takes stress on the syllables ⫽tə⫽ and ⫽ʔe⫽, and is realized as [sʔenˈtəha]. However, this does not explain all consonant clusters, many of which are lexically determined.

=== Phonotactics ===
The most complex syllable in Tsou is CCVV. Tsou is unusual in the number of consonant clusters that it allows. Homorganic clusters are not allowed, unless one is a nasal consonant, and a maximum of two consonants may occur together, but otherwise about half of possible sequences are known to occur. For example, all non-homorganic sequences starting with /t/ and /ts/ are found. Missing clusters may not be allowed, or may simply be accidental gaps due to limited knowledge of the lexicon.

Initial or medial	Medial only
/pt, pts, ps, pn, pk, pŋ, pʔ, ph/	/pz/
/ft, fts, fk, fŋ, fʔ/	/fn/
/vts, vh/	/vn, vʔ/
/ɓn/	/ɓk/
/mp, mf, mts, ms, mz, mn, mʔ, mh/	/mɓ, mt/
/tp, tf, tv, tm, tn, tk, tŋ, tʔ, th/	/tɓ/
/tsp, tsf, tsv, tsm, tsn, tsk, tsŋ, tsʔ, tsh/	/tsɓ/
/sp, sv, sɓ, sm, sn, sk, sŋ, sʔ/	—
—	/zʔ/
/nm, nt, ns/	/np, nv, nts, nz, nk, nʔ, nh/
/ks, kn/	/kts, kʔ/
/ŋv, ŋh/	/ŋm, ŋt, ŋts, ŋs, ŋz, ŋk/
/ʔp, ʔv, ʔm, ʔt, ʔts, ʔs/	/ʔf, ʔɗ, ʔn, ʔk, ʔh/
/hp, hv, hm, ht, hts, hn, hŋ, hʔ/	/hs, hz, hk, hŋ/

In clusters of oral stops, both have an audible release burst. This is true even between vowels, an environment where the first stop has no audible release in most languages, supporting an analysis of these clusters as part of the syllable onset, with no syllable codas occurring in the language.

Stops, oral or nasal, may or may not have a release burst before a nasal stop, depending on the speaker. The initial clusters /hp, ht, hʔ/ are unusual cross-linguistically. The spectrum shows that the tongue moves towards an alveolar articulation during the /h/ of /ht/, demonstrating that it is not articulated as a velar. The initial clusters /pʔ/ and /tʔ/ are sometimes realized as two released stops, but sometimes with a single release, resembling ejective consonants in other languages. (/kʔ/ is again notably missing, except intervocalically, despite the fact that [kʼ] is the most common ejective cross-linguistically.)

== Grammar ==
=== Syntax ===
Like most other Austronesian languages, Tsou displays a predicate-initial syntax.

Tsou has three main types of questions.

1. Yes–no questions
2. Alternative questions
3. Wh-questions (information questions)

Tsou has the following types of clauses:

1. Verbal
  1. Declarative
  2. Imperative
  3. (Verbal) interrogative
2. Equational
3. Existential (no auxiliary verbs are allowed)

Important function words are:

- zou – "to be"
- ʼa – "it is in case that"
- oʼta – (it is) not (in case that)"
- pan – "there is" / existential
- ukʼa – negative existential (usually followed by ci)
- oʼa – negation of a fact or event
- ci – relativizer
- ʼo – prohibition (AV constructions)
- avʼa – prohibition (UV constructions)

Case markers are as follows, with nominative forms placed before slashes and oblique forms placed after them. The nominative form is given when there are no slashes.

- ʼe – visible and near speaker
- si / ta – visible and near hearer
- ta – visible but away from speaker
- ʼo / to – invisible and far away, or newly introduced to discourse
- na / no ~ ne – non-identifiable and non-referential (often when scanning a class of elements)

=== Word classes ===
Tsou nouns are distinguished from verbs by the presence of case markers and suffixed genitive pronouns, both of which cannot be applied to verbs. Verbs, on the other hand, have elaborate voice marking. Adjectives and certain adverbs actually function as verbs, since they also undergo voice inflection and are placed at the same positions within clauses as verbs (i.e., predicate-initial).

Tsou is unique for not having any preposition-like elements, instead using nouns or verbs to express these notions.

=== Verbs ===
Main verbs can take on four types of voices, the actor voice and three undergoer voices, which are marked by suffixes.

1. Actor voice: m-, b-, <m>, or ø
2. Patient voice: -a
3. Locative voice: -i
4. Instrumental/benefactive voice: -(n)eni

Tsou verbs can be divided into five major classes (I, II, III-1, III-2, IV, V-1, V-2) based on morphological alternations. Tsou verbs do not have as many morphological distinctions as other Formosan languages do, since the Tsou language makes more extensive use of auxiliary verbs. For instance, there are no temporal/aspectual distinctions, separate markings for imperatives, and stative/dynamic distinctions. Nevertheless, Tsou still preserves the causative poa- (allomorphs: p-, pa-).

Tsou auxiliary verbs can carry temporal/aspectual and modal information as well as voice. They are marked for the following voices:

1. Actor voice (AV)
2. Undergoer voice (UV), or sometimes referred to as non-actor voice (NAV)

These auxiliary verbs can be divided into three classes:

1. AV constructions – mio, mo, mi-, moso, mo(h)-
2. UV constructions – i-, o(h)-
3. AV/UV constructions – te, ta, tena, nte, ntoso, nto(h)-, la

Tsou has the following aspectual suffixes:

1. -cu/-cʼu – already
2. -nʼa – still, just, about to
3. -la – once

=== Pronouns ===
The personal pronouns below are from the Tfuya dialect of Tsou. Note that third-person pronouns are distinguished between those that are visible or non-visible.

Tfuya Tsou Personal Pronouns
			Free	Bound	
			neutral	nominative	genitive
1st person	singular		aʼo	-ʼo/-ʼu	-ʼo/-ʼu
1st person	plural	exclusive	aʼami	-mza	-mza
1st person	plural	inclusive	aʼati	-to	-to
2nd person	singular		suu	-su/-ko	-su/-ko
2nd person	plural		muu	-mu	-mu
3rd person	visible	singular	taini	-ta	-taini
3rd person	visible	plural	hinʼi	-hinʼi	-hinʼi
3rd person	not visible	singular	icʼo	–	-si
3rd person	not visible	plural	hee	–	-he

== Numerals ==
Tfuya Tsou numerals are:

1. coni; 10. m-as-kʉ
2. yuso; 20. m-pus-ku
3. tuyu; 30. m-tuyu-hu
4. sʉptʉ; 40. m-sʉptʉ-hʉ
5. eimo; 50. m-eimo-hʉ
6. nomʉ; 60. m-onmʉ-hʉ
7. pitu; 70. m-pʉtvʉ-hʉ
8. voyu; 80. m-voyvʉ-hʉ
9. sio; 90. m-sio-hʉ

Tens are derived with the circumfix (confix) m- -hʉ. There is also an u/ʉ vowel harmony phenomenon.

== Language endangerment ==
The Tsou language is endangered as a result of the efforts conducted by the Dutch, Spanish, Japanese, and more recently Chinese, to impose their own education systems on the indigenous people, with the most significant influence being that from the Kuomintang era where children were not only forced to use Mandarin, but also given punishments if they used their own indigenous language. This, in turn, forced them to give up their respective languages in order to survive in the new, imposed environment.

Moreover, due to globalization, younger generations are leaving the villages to look for jobs in big cities; in turn, they are not exposed to their cultures as frequently, and as such do not use their respective languages in their day-to-day lives, thereby preventing its transmission to future generations.

One survey from 1999 found that only 9% of indigenous children could speak their native language, while most other children prefer to use Mandarin, the country's official language. This situation is worsened by the stance of their parents who view that the language is unpractical and as such rarely speak it at home. As a result, the usage of Tsou is restricted to community elders in ceremonies and certain gatherings. The language is found more in school settings where children attend cultural learning programs.

The Tsou language is recognized by the government, which has allocated money dedicated to bring language programs to elementary and junior high schools; however, the funds are sometimes inconsistent, thereby negatively affecting such programs. Despite the lifting of the Martial law in 1987 which resulted in people being able to speak their native languages again, so many other dominant languages were used that several native indigenous languages disappeared.

The elders care about their language and worry that it may not survive in the future, so they welcome any help linguists may provide. In addition, the community has programs to maintain the language. One example is when children get to sing Tsou folk songs in kindergarten and continue to become exposed to other cultural programs through elementary school. People are relying heavily on these kids to keep the language, music, and culture alive. There are programs for elementary and middle school kids to learn the language. Community members are very willing to get involved with events. It is difficult to teach the language because there is a lack of good teaching materials. Schools do not make learning the indigenous language a priority because if an event deemed more important occurs, teachers are likely to put off the language lesson. In addition, students have to worry about studying English, Mandarin, and entrance exam materials, so time is limited and the ethnic language is not a priority in the minds of the younger generation.

== See also ==
- Formosan languages
- Tsouic languages
