= Bunun language =

Formosan language of Taiwan

Bunun
- Bunun
- Native to: Taiwan
- Ethnicity: Bunun people
- Native speakers: 38,000 (2002)
- Language family: Austronesian: Bunun
- Dialects: Isbukun; Takituduh; Takibaka; Takbanuaz; Takivatan; Takipulan †
- Writing system: Latin (Bunun alphabet)

Official status
- Recognised minority language in: Taiwan

Language codes
- ISO 639-3: bnn
- Glottolog: bunu1267
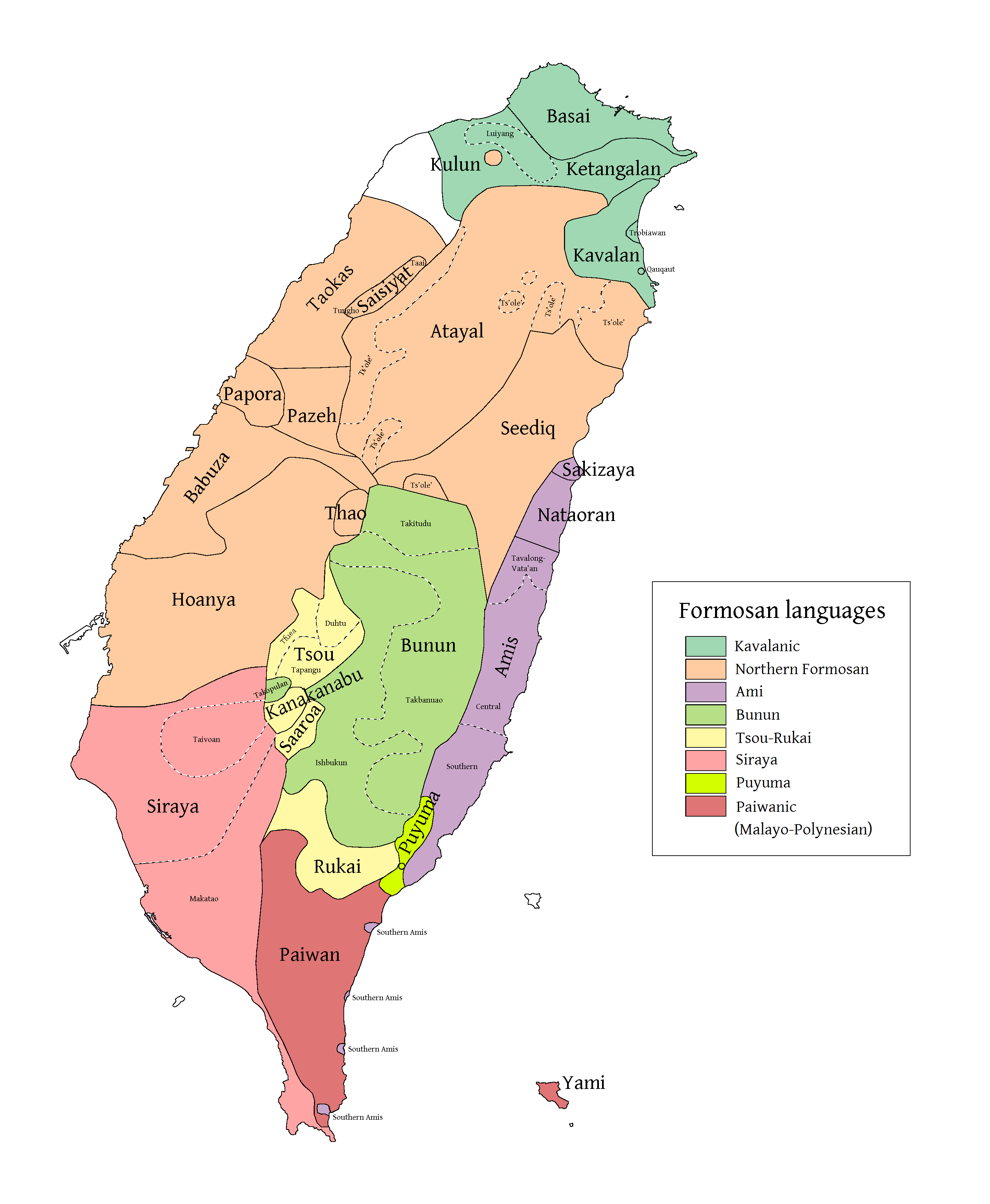
- Distribution of Bunun language (medium green, center)

- Bunun is classified as Vulnerable by the UNESCO Atlas of the World's Languages in Danger

The Bunun language (Chinese: 布農語) is spoken by the Bunun people of Taiwan. It is one of the Formosan languages, a geographic group of Austronesian languages, and is subdivided in five dialects: Isbukun, Takbunuaz, Takivatan, Takibaka and Takituduh. Isbukun, the dominant dialect, is mainly spoken in the south of Taiwan. Takbunuaz and Takivatan are mainly spoken in the center of the country. Takibaka and Takituduh both are northern dialects. A sixth dialect, Takipulan, became extinct in the 1970s.

The Saaroa and Kanakanavu, two smaller minority groups who share their territory with an Isbukun Bunun group, have also adopted Bunun as their vernacular.

== Name ==
The name Bunun literally means "human" or "man".

== Dialects ==
Bunun is currently subdivided into five dialects: Isbukun, Takbunuaz, Takivatan, Takibaka and Takituduh. Li (1988) splits these dialects into three main branches — Northern, Central, and Isbukun (also classified as Southern Bunun). Takipulan, a sixth dialect, became extinct in the 1970s. Isbukun, the prestige dialect, is also the most divergent dialect. The most conservative dialects are in the Northern branch.

- Proto-Bunun
  - Isbukun
  - North-Central
    - Northern
      - Takituduh
      - Takibakha
    - Central
      - Takbanuaz
      - Takivatan

Bunun was originally spoken in and around Sinyi Township (Xinyi) in Nantou County. From the 17th century onwards, the Bunun people expanded towards the south and east, absorbing other ethnic groups such as the Saaroa, Kanakanavu, and Thao. Bunun is spoken in an area stretching from Ren-ai Township in Nantou in the north to Yan-ping Township in Taitung in the south. Isbukun is distributed throughout Nantou, Taitung, and Kaohsiung. Takbanuaz is spoken in Nantou and southern Hualien County. Takivatan is spoken in Nantou and central Hualien. Both Takituduh and Takibakha are spoken in Nantou.

== Proto-Bunun ==
Shibata (2020) has a reconstruction of Proto-Bunun.

== Phonology ==
=== Consonants ===
Consonant inventory
		Labial	Dental	Alveolar	Velar	Uvular	Glottal
Nasal		m		n	ŋ ⟨ng⟩		
Plosive	plain	p		t	k	q	ʔ ⟨ʼ⟩
Plosive	implosive	ɓ ⟨b⟩		ɗ ⟨d⟩			ʔ ⟨ʼ⟩
Fricative		v	ð ⟨z⟩	s		χ	h
Approximant				l			

Orthographic notes:

- /dʒ/ as ⟨j⟩.

Notes:

- The glides /j w/ exist, but are derived from the underlying vowels /i u/ to meet the requirements that syllables must have onset consonants. They are therefore not part of the consonant inventory.
- The dental fricative /ð/ is actually interdental (/ð̟/).
- In the Isbukun dialect, /χ/ often occurs in final or post-consonantal position and /h/ in initial and intervocalic position, whereas other dialects have /q/ in both of these positions.
- While Isbukun drops the intervocalic glottal stops (/ʔ/) found in other dialects, /ʔ/ also occurs where /h/ occurs in other dialects. (For example, the Isbukun word [mapais] bitter is [mapaʔis] in other dialects; the Isbukun word [luʔum] 'cloud' is [luhum] in other dialects.)
- The alveolar affricate /dʒ/ occurs in the Taitung variety of Isbukun, usually represented in other dialects as /t/.

=== Vowels ===
Vowel inventory
	Front	Central	Back
High	i		u
Mid	e		
Low		a	

Notes:

- /e/ does not occur in Isbukun.

== Grammar ==
=== Overview ===
Bunun is a verb-initial language and has an Austronesian alignment system or focus system. This means that Bunun clauses do not have a nominative–accusative or absolutive–ergative alignment, but that arguments of a clause are ordered according to which participant in the event described by the verb is 'in focus'. In Bunun, three distinct roles can be in focus:

- the agent: the person or thing that is doing the action or achieving/maintaining a state;
- the undergoer: the person or thing that is somehow participating in the action without being an agent; there are three kinds of undergoers:
  - patients: persons or things to whom an action is done or an event happens
  - instruments: things (sometimes persons) which are used to perform an action
  - beneficiaries (also called recipients): the persons (sometimes things) for whom an action is done or for whom an event happens
- the locative participant: the location where an action takes place; in languages with a Philippine-style voice system, spatial location is often at the same level in a clause as agents and patients, rather than being an adverbial clause, like in English. (Note: see Schachter & Otanes (1972) for a discussion of location in Tagalog)

Which argument is in focus is indicated on the verb by a combination of prefixes and suffixes.

- a verb in agent focus is often unmarked, but can get the prefix ma- or – more rarely – pa- or ka-
- a verb in undergoer focus gets a suffix -un
- a verb locative focus gets a suffix -an

Many other languages with a focus system have different marking for patients, instruments and beneficiaries, but this is not the case in Bunun. The focussed argument in a Bunun clause will normally always occur immediately after the verb (e.g. in an actor-focus clause, the agent will appear before any other participant) and is in the Isbukun dialect marked with a post-nominal marker a.

Bunun has a very large class of auxiliary verbs. Concepts that are expressed by auxiliaries include:

- negation (ni 'be not' and uka 'have not')
- modality and volition (e.g. maqtu 'can, be allowed')
- relative time (e.g. ngausang 'first, beforehand', qanaqtung 'be finished')
- comparison (maszang 'the same, similarly')
- question words (e.g. via 'why?')
- sometimes numerals (e.g. tatini '(be) alone, (be) only one')

In fact, Bunun auxiliaries express all sorts of concepts that in English would be expressed by adverbial phrases, with the exception of time and place, which are normally expressed with adverbial phrases.

=== Word classes ===
Takivatan Bunun has the following word classes (De Busser 2009:189). (Note: Words in open classes can be compounded, whereas those in closed classes cannot.)

Open classes

1. Nouns
2. Verbs
3. Adjectives

Closed classes

1. Demonstratives
2. Anaphoric pronouns
3. Personal pronouns
4. Numerals
5. Place words
6. Time words
7. Manner words
8. Question words
9. Auxiliaries

=== Affixes ===
Bunun is morphologically agglutinative language and has a very elaborate set of derivational affixes (more than 200, which are mostly prefixes), most of which derive verbs from other word classes. Some of these prefixes are special in that they do not only occur in the verb they derive, but are also foreshadowed on a preceding auxiliary. These are called lexical prefixes or anticipatory prefixes and only occur in Bunun and a small number of other Formosan languages.

Below are some Takivatan Bunun verbal prefixes from De Busser (2009).

Takivatan Bunun verbal prefixes
Type of prefix	Neutral	Causative	Accusative
Movement from	mu-	pu-	ku-
Dynamic event	ma-	pa-	ka-
Stative event	ma- / mi-	pi-	ka- / ki-
Inchoative event	min-	pin-	kin-

In short:

- Movement from: Cu-
- Dynamic event: Ca-
- Stative event: Ci-
- Inchoative event: Cin-
- Neutral: mV-
- Causative: pV-
- Accusative: kV-

A more complete list of Bunun affixes from De Busser (2009) is given below.

Focus

- agent focus (AF): -Ø
- undergoer focus (UF): -un (also used as a nominalizer)
- locative focus (LF): -an (also used as a nominalizer)

Tense-aspect-mood (TAM) affixes

- na- irrealis (futurity, consequence, volition, imperatives). This is also the least bound TAM prefix.
- -aŋ progressive (progressive aspect, simultaneity, expressing wishes/optative usage)
- -in perfective (completion, resultative meaning, change of state, anteriority)
- -in- past/resultative (past, past/present contrast)
- -i- past infix which occurs only occasionally

Participant cross-reference

- -Ø agent
- -un patient
- -an locative
- is- instrumental
- ki- beneficiary

Locative prefixes

- Stationary ‘at, in’: i-
- Itinerary ‘arrive at’: atan-, pan-, pana-
- Allative ‘to’: mu-, mun-
- Terminative ‘until’: sau-
- Directional ‘toward, in the direction of’: tan-, tana-
- Viative ‘along, following’: malan-
- Perlative ‘through, into’: tauna-, tuna-, tun-
- Ablative ‘from’: maisna-, maina-, maisi-, taka-

Event-type prefixes

- ma- Marks dynamic events
- ma- Marks stative events
- mi- Marks stative negative events
- a- Unproductive stative prefix
- paŋka- Marks material properties (stative)
- min- Marks result states (transformational)
- pain- Participatory; marks group actions

Causative

- pa- causative of dynamic verb
- pi- causative of stative verb
- pu- cause to go towards

Classification of events

- mis- burning events
- tin- shock events
- pala- splitting events
- pasi- separating events
- kat- grasping events

Patient-incorporating prefixes

- bit- 'lightning'
- kun- 'wear'
- malas- 'speak'
- maqu- 'use'
- muda- 'walk'
- pas- 'spit'
- qu- 'drink'
- sa- 'see'
- tal- 'wash'
- tapu- 'have trait'
- tastu- 'belong'
- taus-/tus- 'give birth'
- tin- 'harvest'
- tum- 'drive'

Verbalizers

- pu- verbalizer: 'to hunt for'
- maqu- verbalizer: 'to use'
- malas- verbalizer: 'to speak'

=== Pronouns ===
Takivatan Bunun personal pronoun roots are (De Busser 2009:453):

- 1s: -ak-
- 2s: -su-
- 3s: -is-
- 1p (incl.): -at-
- 1p (excl.): -ðam-
- 2p: -(a)mu-
- 3p: -in-

The tables of Takivatan Bunun personal pronouns below are sourced from De Busser (2009:441).

Takivatan Bunun Personal Pronouns
Type of Pronoun	Root	Foc. Agent (bound)	Non-Foc. Agent (bound)	Neutral	Foc. Agent	Locative	Possessive
1s.	-ak-	-(ʔ)ak	-(ʔ)uk	ðaku, nak	sak, saikin	ðakuʔan	inak, ainak, nak
2s.	-su-	-(ʔ)as	–	suʔu, su	–	suʔuʔan	isu, su
1p. (incl.)	-at-	–	–	mita	ʔata, inʔata	mitaʔan	imita
1p. (excl.)	-ðam-	-(ʔ)am	–	ðami, nam	ðamu, sam	ðamiʔan	inam, nam
2p.	-(a)mu-	-(ʔ)am	–	muʔu, mu	amu	muʔuʔan	imu, mu

Takivatan Bunun Third-Person Personal Pronouns
	Singular	Plural
[Root]	-is-	-in-
Proximal	isti	inti
Medial	istun	intun
Distal	ista	inta

Iskubun Bunun personal pronouns are somewhat different (De Busser 2009:454).

Iskubun Bunun Personal Pronouns
Type of Pronoun	Agent	Undergoer	Possessive
1s.	saikin, -ik	ðaku, -ku	inak, nak
2s.	kasu, -as	su	isu, su
3s.	saia	saiʤa	isaiʤa, saiʤa
1p. (incl.)	kata, -ta	mita	imita
1p. (excl.)	kaimin, -im	ðami	inam
2p.	kamu, -am	mu	imu
3p.	naia	inaiʤa	naiʤa

=== Demonstratives ===
Takivatan Bunun has the following demonstrative roots and affixes (De Busser 2009:454):

Demonstrative suffixes

1. Proximal: -i
2. Medial: -un
3. Distal: -a

Demonstrative roots

1. aip-: singular
2. aiŋk-: vague plural
3. aint-: paucal
4. ait-: inclusive generic

Demonstrative prefixes

1. Ø-: visible
2. n-: not visible

Place words

1. ʔiti here
2. ʔitun there (medial)
3. ʔita there (distal)

=== Function words ===
- sia anaphoric marker, "aforementioned"; also used as a hesitation marker
- tu attributive marker
- duma "others"
- itu honorific marker

Takivatan Bunun also has definitive markers.

Takivatan Bunun Definiteness Markers
	Singular	Plural
Proximal	-ti	-ki
Medial	-tun	-kun
Distal	-ta	-ka
