= Sino-Austronesian languages =

Proposed language family

Sino-Austronesian
- (hypothetical)
- Geographic distribution: East, South and Southeast Asia
- Linguistic classification: proposed language family
- Subdivisions: Sino-Tibetan; Austronesian (including Kra–Dai)

Language codes
- Glottolog: None

Sino-Austronesian or Sino-Tibetan-Austronesian is a proposed language family suggested by Laurent Sagart in 1990. Using reconstructions of Old Chinese, Sagart argued that the Austronesian languages are related to the Sinitic languages phonologically, lexically and morphologically. Sagart later accepted the Sino-Tibetan languages as a valid group and extended his proposal to include the rest of Sino-Tibetan. He also placed the Tai–Kadai languages within the Austronesian family as a sister branch of Malayo-Polynesian. The proposal has been largely rejected by other linguists who argue that the similarities between Austronesian and Sino-Tibetan more likely arose from contact rather than being genetic.

== Classification ==
=== Sagart (2004) ===
The classification below follows Sagart (2004).

- Sino-Austronesian (Sino-Tibetan–Austronesian)
  - Sino-Tibetan
    - Tibeto-Burman
    - Sinitic
  - Austronesian
    - Luilang, Pazeh, Saisiat
    - Pituish
      - Atayalic, Thao, Favorlang, Taokas, Papora, Hoanya
      - Enemish
        - Siraya
        - Walu-Siwaish
          - Tsouic, Paiwan, Rukai, Puyuma, Amis, Bunun
          - Muish
            - Northeastern Formosan (Kavalan, etc.)
            - Tai–Kadai (Daic or Kra–Dai)
            - Malayo-Polynesian

Sagart suggests that monosyllabic Old Chinese words correspond to the second syllables of disyllabic Proto-Austronesian roots. However, the type A/B distinction in OC, corresponding to non-palatalized or palatalized syllables in Middle Chinese, is considered to correspond to a voiceless/voiced initial in PAN.

Gloss	Proto-Austronesian	Chinese
brain	*punuq	腦 *^{a}nuʔ > nǎo
salt	*siRaH_{1}	鹵 *^{a}raʔ > lǔ
foxtail millet	*beCeng	稷 *^{b}tsək > jì

=== Starosta (2005) ===
Stanley Starosta (2005) expands Sagart's Sino-Austronesian tree with a "Yangzian" branch, consisting of Austroasiatic and Hmong–Mien, to form an East Asian superphylum.

== Criticism ==
Weera Ostapirat (2005) supports the link between Austronesian and Kra–Dai (Sagart built upon Ostapirat's findings), though as sister groups. However, he rejects a link to Sino-Tibetan, noting that the apparent cognates are rarely found in all branches of Kra–Dai, and almost none are in core vocabulary.

Austronesian linguists Paul Jen-kuei Li and Robert Blust have criticized Sagart's comparisons, on the grounds of loose semantic matches, inconsistent correspondences, and that basic vocabulary is hardly represented. They also note that comparing with the second syllable of disyllabic Austronesian roots vastly increases the odds of chance resemblance. Blust has been particularly critical of Sagart's use of the comparative method. Laurent Sagart (2016) responds to some of the criticisms by Blust (2009).

Alexander Vovin (1997) does not accept Sino-Austronesian as a valid grouping, but instead suggests that some of the Sino-Austronesian parallels proposed by Sagart may in fact be due to an Austronesian substratum in Old Chinese. This view is also espoused by George van Driem, who suggests that Austronesian and Sinitic had come into contact with each other during the fourth and third millennia BC in the Longshan interaction sphere.

== Distributions ==
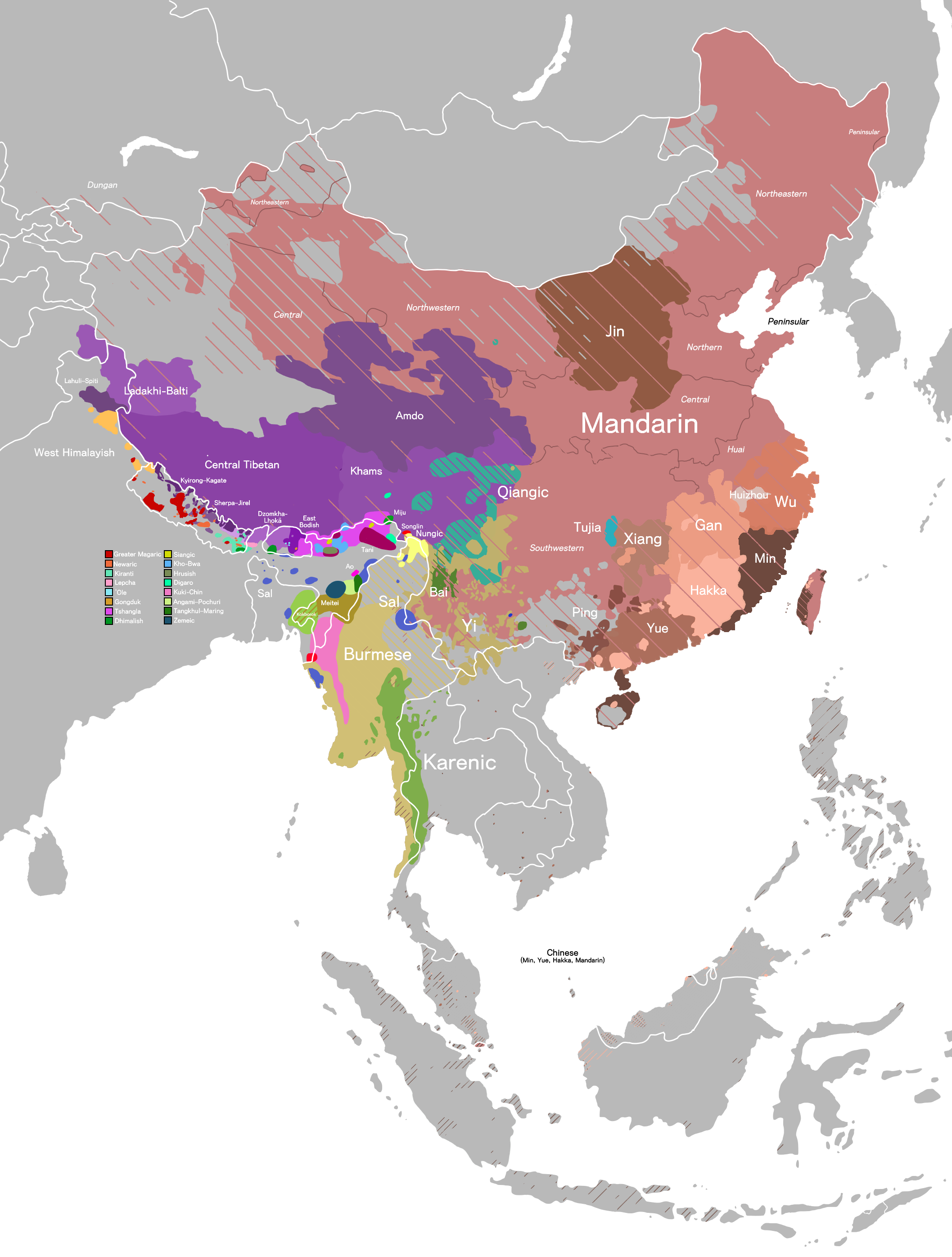
Distribution of Sino-Tibetan languages

Distribution of Tai–Kadai languages

Dispersal of Austronesian languages

== See also ==
- Classification schemes for Southeast Asian languages
  - East Asian languages
  - Austric languages
  - Austro-Tai languages
- Dené–Caucasian languages (Sino-Caucasian)
- Mainland Southeast Asia linguistic area
- Haplogroup O (Y-DNA)
- Languages of China
