= Papora =

Papora may refer to:

- Papora people
- Papora language
