= Atayal =

Atayal may refer to:

- Atayal people, of Taiwan
- Atayal language, their Austronesian language

== See also ==
- Atayalic languages, an Austronesian language group of Taiwan
