= Papora people =

Papora, Wux'uran, Bopalat, Basagar, Babusagar
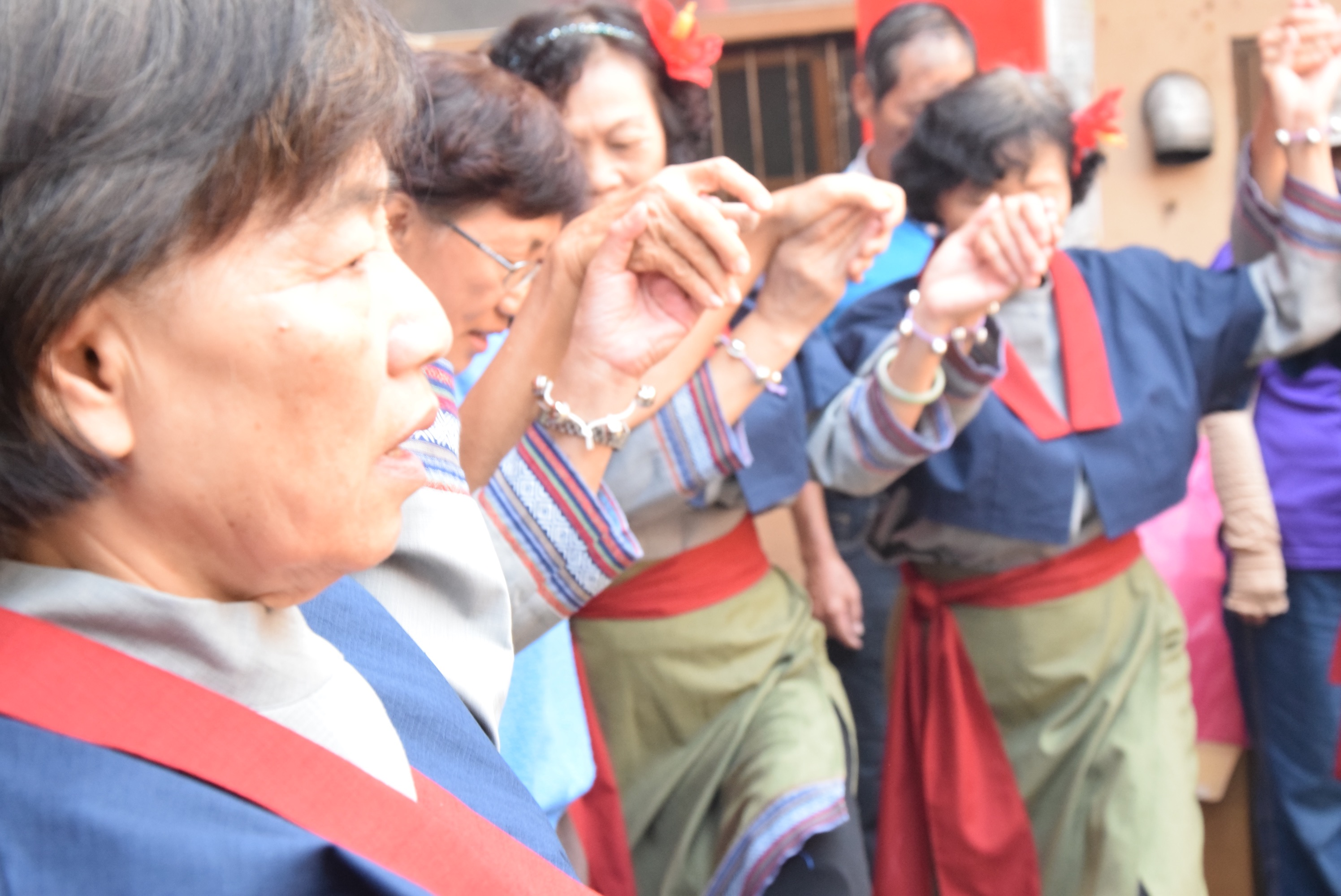
- Papora women dancing for the harvest festival.

Total population
- Around 27

Regions with significant populations
- Taiwan

Languages
- Papora, Taiwanese, Mandarin

Religion
- Christianity

Related ethnic groups
- Taokas

The Papora (Chinese: 拍瀑拉; pinyin: Bābùlė) are a Taiwanese indigenous people. They lived primarily in the area around Taichung and the Taiwanese western coastal littoral. During the Ming and Qing dynasties, the Dutch East India Company traded with the Papora and provide records of life among them. Not much is known about the history of the people of Papora, as records were destroyed in a mass genocide committed in 1670 by Koxinga's forces following widespread resistance by the Papora, Babuza, Taokas and Pazeh peoples of the central plain.

The Papora formerly used both Papora and Chinese names, though similar to most indigenous people, most now only use Chinese names. The Papora language went extinct around 1969.

== Notable people ==
- Jolin Tsai (born 1980), Taiwanese singer, one quarter Papora.

== See also ==
- Kingdom of Middag
- Taiwanese indigenous peoples
