= Taokas people =

Taokan, Taokas
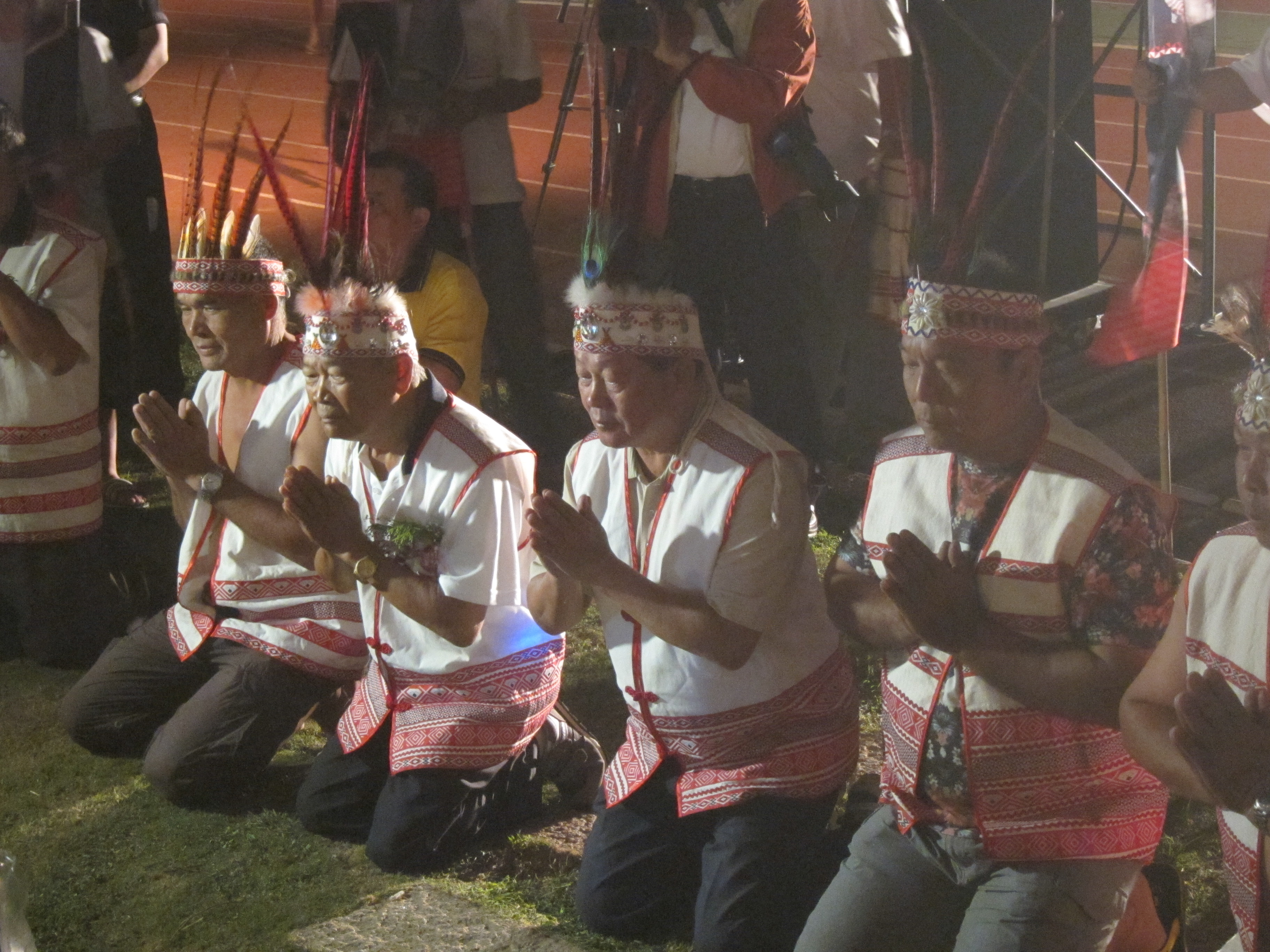
- Taokas men on the annual ceremony Khantian.

Regions with significant populations
- Hsinchu, Miaoli, and Nantou in Taiwan

Languages
- Taokas, Taiwanese, Mandarin

Religion
- Animism, Taoism, Buddhism, Christianity

Related ethnic groups
- Babuza, Saisiyat

The Taokas people (Chinese: 道卡斯族; pinyin: Dàokǎsīzú) are one of a number of Austronesian Indigenous ethno-linguistic groups that inhabited the plains of western Taiwan. The Taokas were located in the areas around today's Hsinchu City/Hsinchu County, Miaoli County, and Taichung City region. Several Taokas groups have been historically linked to many revolts that plagued Taiwan during the Qing era (1683–1895). The Taokas were not always opposed to Han encroachment on their lands as several Taokas groups were involved in building the Ta-Chia Mazu Temple. Today, only a small number of people in the central city of Puli identify themselves as ethnic Taokas or even Taiwanese Aborigines. The Taokas people have a long history of fishing and preserving their traditions and beliefs, including the worship of sea gods and the performance of traditional dances and music.

== See also ==
- Demographics of Taiwan
- Taiwanese indigenous peoples
