= Babuza language =

Formosan language of the Babuza and Taokas, indigenous peoples of Taiwan

Babuza
- Native to: Taiwan
- Region: central Taiwan
- Ethnicity: 35 Babuza, Taokas
- Extinct: 2000s
- Revival: 2020
- Language family: Austronesian: Western Plains Formosan; Central; Babuza
- Early form: Favorlang?
- Dialects: Poavosa; Taokas
- Writing system: Latin script

Official status
- Regulated by: Academia Sinica

Language codes
- ISO 639-3: bzg (with Favorlang)
- Glottolog: babu1240
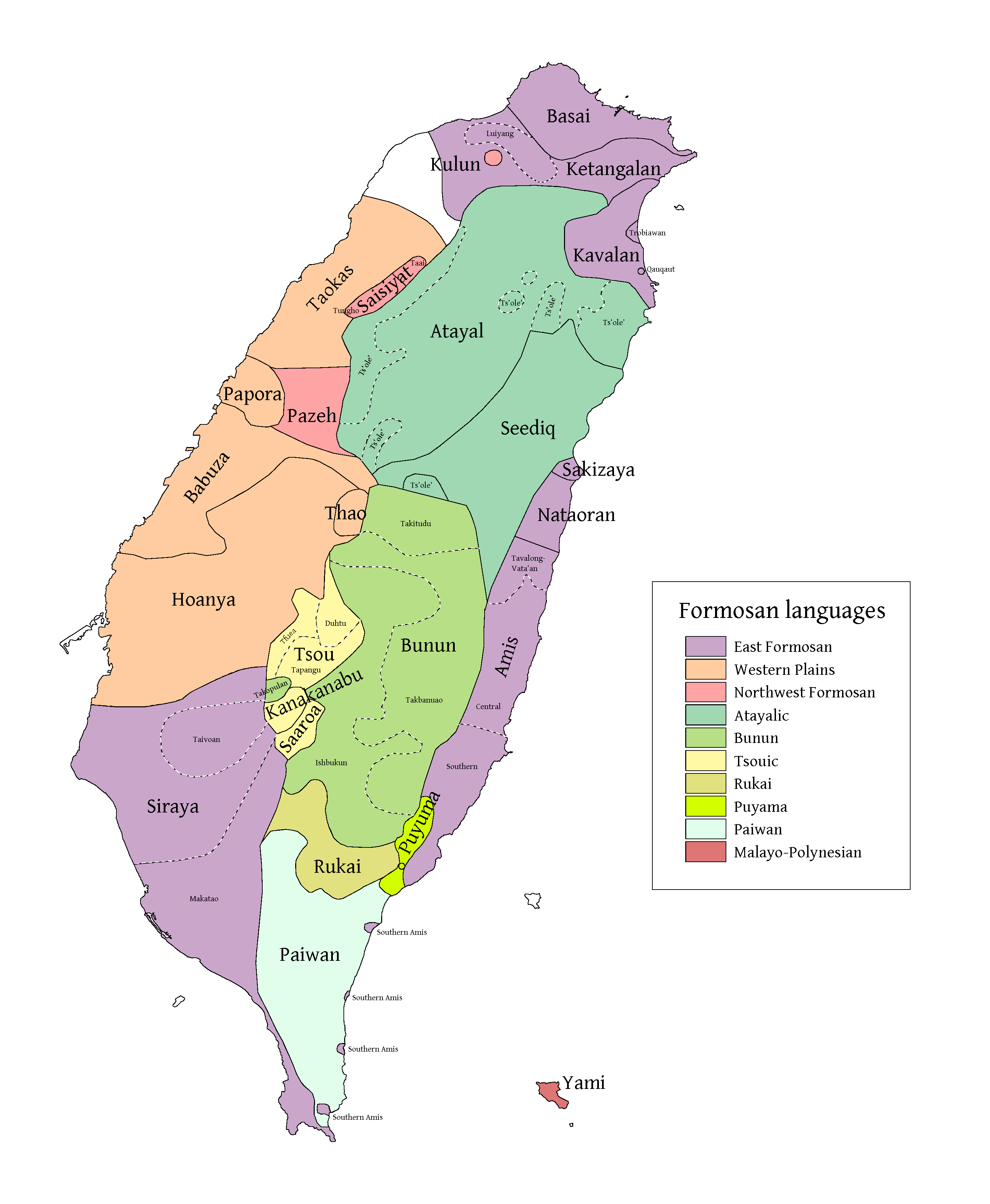
- (orange) The Babuza, Papora-Hoanya, and Thao languagese

- Babuza is classified as Extinct by the UNESCO Atlas of the World's Languages in Danger

Babuza is a Formosan language of the Babuza and Taokas, indigenous peoples of Taiwan. It is related to or perhaps descended from Favorlang, attested from the 17th century.

Babuza was once spoken along much of the western coast of Taiwan. Its two rather divergent dialects, Poavosa and the extinct Taokas, were separated by Papora and Pazeh.

The first commercial publication to be written in Taokas is the picture book Osubalaki, Balalong Ramut, published in 2020.

== See also ==
- Favorlang language

== Resources ==
=== Dictionary ===
- Happart, Gilbertus (1840) [1650]. Dictionary of the Favorlang Dialect of the Formosan Language. Medhurst, W. H. Batavia.
