= Laurent Sagart =

French linguist (born 1951)

- Born: 1951 (age 74–75); Paris, France

Academic background
- Education: University of Paris 7 (Ph.D.); University of Provence (doctorat d'État)

Academic work
- Institutions: French National Centre for Scientific Research
- Main interests: Chinese linguistics, Sino-Tibetan, Austronesian

Chinese name
- Traditional Chinese: 沙加爾
- Simplified Chinese: 沙加尔
Transcriptions
Standard Mandarin
- Hanyu Pinyin: Shā Jiā'ěr
- Wade–Giles: Sha Chia-erh
- IPA: [ʂá tɕjá.àɚ]
Yue: Cantonese
- Jyutping: Saa1 Gaa1-ji5
- IPA: [sa˥ ka˥.ji˩˧]
Middle Chinese
- Middle Chinese: srae kae-nyeX
Old Chinese
- Baxter–Sagart (2014): /*sˤraj kˤraj.n[ə][r]ʔ/

Laurent Sagart (French: [saɡaʁ]; born 1951) is a senior researcher at the Centre de recherches linguistiques sur l'Asie orientale (CRLAO – UMR 8563) unit of the French National Centre for Scientific Research (CNRS).

== Biography ==
Born in Paris in 1951, he earned his Ph.D. in 1977 at the University of Paris 7 and his doctorat d'État in 1990 at University of Aix-Marseille 1. His early work focused on Chinese dialectology. He then turned his attention to Old Chinese, attempting a reconstruction of Old Chinese that separated word roots and affixes. His recent work, in collaboration with William H. Baxter, is a reconstruction of Old Chinese that builds on earlier scholarship and in addition takes into account paleography, phonological distinctions in conservative Chinese dialects (Min, Hakka, and Waxiang) as well as the early layers of Chinese loanwords to Vietic, Hmong-Mien and to a lesser extent, Kra-Dai. A reconstruction of 4,000 Chinese characters has been published online. Their 2014 book has been awarded the Leonard Bloomfield Book Award from the Linguistic Society of America.

== Sino-Austronesian ==
Sagart is known for his proposal of the Sino-Austronesian language family. He considers the Austronesian languages to be related to the Sino-Tibetan languages, and also treats the Tai–Kadai languages as a sister group to the Malayo-Polynesian languages within the Austronesian language family.

== Indo-European ==
Laurent Sagart also contributed to Indo-European studies. He co-authored a proposal that the ability to digest milk played an important role in the Indo-European expansion (Garnier et al. 2017), and took part in a controversy in French academia concerning Indo-European studies (Pellard et al. 2018).

== Origin of Sino-Tibetan language family ==
Along with numerous researchers such as Valentin Thouzeau, Robin J. Ryder, Simon J. Greenhill, Johann-Mattis List, Guillaume Jacques and Yunfan Lai, Sagart conclude in a study published in the Proceedings of the National Academy of Sciences of the United States of America that the Sino-Tibetan languages originated among millet farmers, located in Northern China, around 7,200 years ago.

== Selected works ==
- Sagart, Laurent (1982). "A List of Sung Him Tong Hakka words of dubious etymology". Cahiers de Linguistique Asie Orientale. 11 (2): 69–86. doi:10.3406/clao.1982.1116. ISSN 0153-3320.
- Sagart, Laurent (1993). "Chinese and Austronesian: Evidence for a Genetic Relationship". Journal of Chinese Linguistics. 21 (1): 1–63.
- Sagart, Laurent (1994). "Proto-Austronesian and Old Chinese Evidence for Sino-Austronesian". Oceanic Linguistics. 33 (2): 271–308. doi:10.2307/3623130. JSTOR 3623130.
- Sagart, Laurent; Baxter, William H. (1997). "Word Formation in Old Chinese". In Packard, Jerome L. (ed.). New Approaches to Chinese Word Formation. Perspectives in Analytical Linguistics. Vol. 105.
- Sagart, Laurent (1999). The Roots of Old Chinese. Current Issues in Linguistic Theory. Vol. 184. Amsterdam: John Benjamins Publishing.
- Sagart, Laurent (2004). "The Higher Phylogeny of Austronesian and the Position of Tai-Kadai" (PDF). Oceanic Linguistics. 43 (2): 411–44. doi:10.1353/ol.2005.0012. S2CID 49547647.
- Shā Jiā’ěr 沙加尔 [Laurent Sagart] and Bái Yīpíng 白一平 [William H. Baxter]. 2010. Shànggǔ Hànyǔ de N- hé m- qiánzhuì 上古汉语的 N- 和 m- 前缀. Hàn-Zàng yǔ xuébào 汉藏语学报 [Journal of Sino-Tibetan Linguistics] 4. 62–69.
- Sagart, Laurent; Baxter, William H. (2014). Old Chinese: A New Reconstruction. Oxford: Oxford University Press.
- Garnier, Romain; Sagart, Laurent; Sagot, Benoît (2017). "Milk and the Indo-Europeans". In Robbeets, Martine; Savelyev, Alexander (eds.). Language Dispersal Beyond Farming (PDF). pp. 291–311. doi:10.1075/z.215. hdl:11858/00-001M-0000-002E-910A-0. ISBN 978-90-272-1255-9. S2CID 135078791.
- Pellard, Thomas; Jacques, Guillaume; Sagart, Laurent (2018). "L'indo-européen n'est pas un mythe". Bulletin de la Société de Linguistique de Paris. 113 (1): 79–102. doi:10.2143/BSL.113.1.3285465. S2CID 171874630.
- Sagart, Laurent; Jacques, Guillaume; Lai, Yunfan; Ryder, Robin; Thouzeau, Valentin; Greenhill, Simon J.; List, Johann-Mattis (2019). "Dated language phylogenies shed light on the ancestry of Sino-Tibetan". Proceedings of the National Academy of Sciences of the United States of America. 116 (21): 10317–10322. Bibcode:2019PNAS..11610317S. doi:10.1073/pnas.1817972116. PMC 6534992. PMID 31061123.
