= Austronesian languages =

Large language family mostly of Southeast Asia and the Pacific

Austronesian
- Geographic distribution: Taiwan, Maritime Southeast Asia, Madagascar, parts of Mainland Southeast Asia, Hainan (China), and Oceania
- Ethnicity: Austronesian peoples
- Native speakers: (undated figure of 386 million)
- Linguistic classification: One of the world's primary language families
- Proto-language: Proto-Austronesian
- Subdivisions: Atayalic (Formosan); Bunun (Formosan); East Formosan (Formosan); Malayo-Polynesian; Western Plains (Formosan); Northwest Formosan (Formosan); Paiwan (Formosan); Puyuma (Formosan); Rukai (Formosan); Tsouic (Formosan)

Language codes
- ISO 639-2 / 5: map
- Glottolog: aust1307
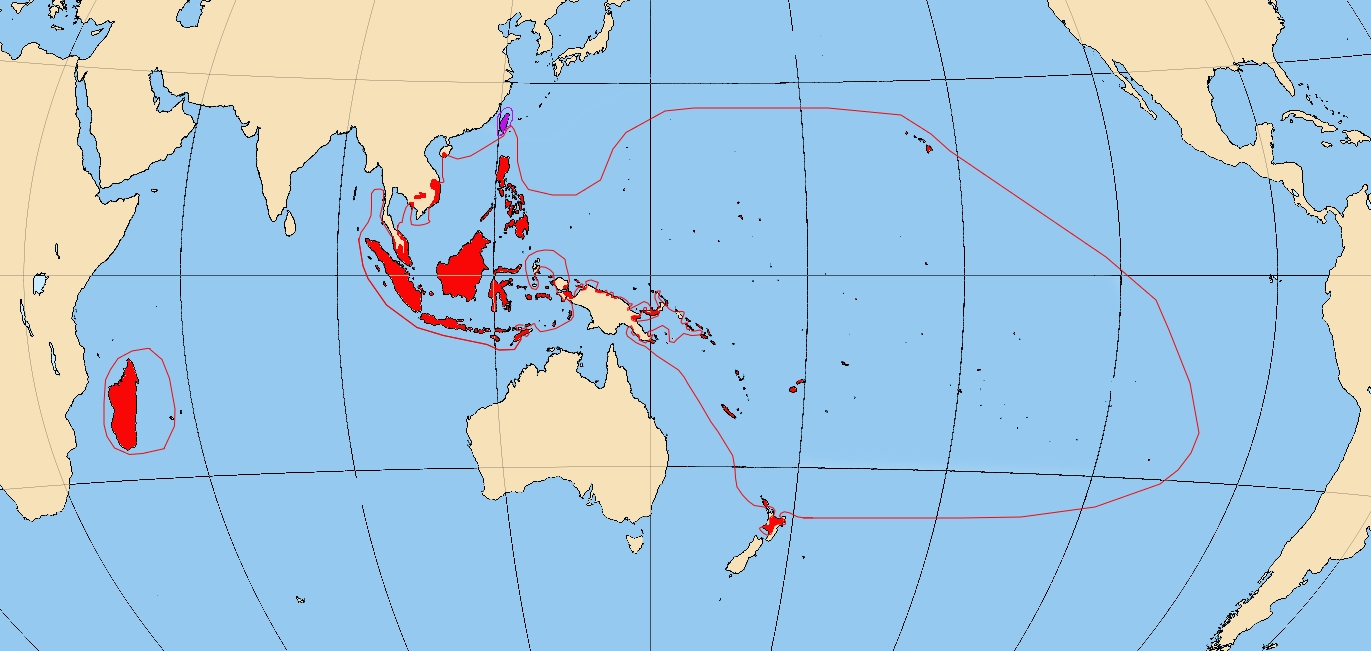
- Historical distribution of Austronesian languages Malayo-Polynesian branch included islands and archipelagos Formosan languages included region

The Austronesian languages (/ˌɔːstrəˈniːʒən/ AW-strə-NEE-zhən) are a language family widely spoken throughout Maritime Southeast Asia, parts of Mainland Southeast Asia, Madagascar, the islands of the Pacific Ocean and Taiwan (by Taiwanese indigenous peoples). They are spoken by approximately 386 million people (4.4% of the world population). This makes it the fifth-largest language family by number of speakers. Major Austronesian languages include Malay (one variant standardized as Indonesian), Javanese, Sundanese, Tagalog (and its standardized form Filipino), Malagasy and Cebuano. According to some estimates, the family contains 1,257 languages, which is the second most of any language family.

In 1706, the Dutch scholar Adriaan Reland first observed similarities between the languages spoken in the South East Asia Archipelago and by peoples on islands in the Pacific Ocean. In the 19th century, researchers (e.g. Wilhelm von Humboldt, Herman van der Tuuk) started to apply the comparative method to the Austronesian languages. The first extensive study on the history of the phonology was made by the German linguist Otto Dempwolff. It included a reconstruction of the Proto-Austronesian lexicon. The term Austronesian was coined (as German austronesisch) by Wilhelm Schmidt, deriving it from Latin auster "south" and Ancient Greek νῆσος (nêsos "island"), meaning the "Southern Island languages".

Most Austronesian languages are spoken by the people of Insular Southeast Asia and Oceania. Only a few languages, such as Peninsular Malay varieties, Jakun, Temuan, Urak Lawoiʼ and the Chamic languages (except Acehnese), are indigenous to mainland Asia, or Malagasy which is the only Austronesian language indigenous to Insular East Africa. There are few Austronesian languages which have populations exceeding a few thousand, but a handful have speaking populations in the millions; Indonesian, the most widely spoken, has around 252 million speakers, making it the tenth most-spoken language in the world. Approximately twenty Austronesian languages are official in their respective countries.

By the number of languages they include, Austronesian and Niger–Congo are the two largest language families in the world. They each contain roughly one-fifth of the world's languages. The geographical span of Austronesian was the largest of any language family in the first half of the second millennium AD, before the spread of Indo-European languages in the colonial period. It ranges from Madagascar to Easter Island in the eastern Pacific.

According to Robert Blust (1999), Austronesian is divided into several primary branches, all but one of which are found exclusively in Taiwan. The Formosan languages of Taiwan are grouped into as many as nine first-order subgroups of Austronesian. All Austronesian languages spoken outside the Taiwan mainland (including its offshore Yami language) belong to the Malayo-Polynesian (sometimes called Extra-Formosan) branch.

Most Austronesian languages lack a long history of written attestation. The oldest inscription in the Cham language, the Đông Yên Châu inscription dated to c. 350 AD, is the first attestation of any Austronesian language.

== Typological characteristics ==
=== Phonology ===
The Austronesian languages overall possess phoneme inventories which are smaller than the world average. Around 90% of the Austronesian languages have inventories of 19–25 sounds (15–20 consonants and 4–5 vowels), thus lying at the lower end of the global typical range of 20–37 sounds. However, extreme inventories are also found, such as Nemi (New Caledonia) with 43 consonants.

The canonical root type in Proto-Austronesian is disyllabic with the shape CV(C)CVC (C = consonant; V = vowel), and is still found in many Austronesian languages. In most languages, consonant clusters are only allowed in medial position, and often, there are restrictions for the first element of the cluster. There is a common drift to reduce the number of consonants which can appear in final position, e.g. Buginese, which only allows the two consonants /ŋ/ and /ʔ/ as finals, out of a total number of 18 consonants. Complete absence of final consonants is observed e.g. in Nias, Malagasy and many Oceanic languages.

Tonal contrasts are rare in Austronesian languages, although Moken–Moklen and a few languages of the Chamic, South Halmahera–West New Guinea and New Caledonian subgroups do show lexical tone.

=== Morphology ===
Most Austronesian languages are agglutinative languages with a relatively high number of affixes, and clear morpheme boundaries. Most affixes are prefixes (Malay ber-jalan 'walk' < jalan 'road'), with a smaller number of suffixes (Tagalog titis-án 'ashtray' < títis 'ash') and infixes (Roviana t<in>avete 'work (noun)' < tavete 'work (verb)').

Reduplication is commonly employed in Austronesian languages. This includes full reduplication (Malay anak-anak 'children' < anak 'child'; Karo Batak nipe-nipe 'caterpillar' < nipe 'snake') or partial reduplication (Agta taktakki 'legs' < takki 'leg', at-atu 'puppy' < atu 'dog').

=== Syntax ===
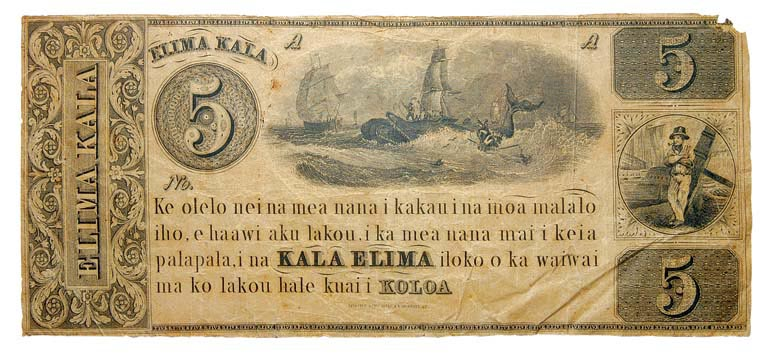
A 5 dollar banknote, Hawaii, c. 1839, using the Hawaiian language

It is difficult to make generalizations about the languages that make up a family as diverse as Austronesian. Very broadly, one can divide the Austronesian languages into three groups based upon their grammatical typologies: Philippine-type languages, Indonesian-type languages and post-Indonesian type languages:

- The first group, the Philippine-type languages include, besides the languages of the Philippines, the Austronesian languages of Taiwan, Sabah, North Sulawesi and Madagascar. It is primarily characterized by the retention of the original system of Philippine-type voice alternations, where typically three or four verb voices determine which semantic role the "subject"/"topic" expresses (it may express either the actor, the patient, the location and the beneficiary, or various other circumstantial roles such as instrument and concomitant). The phenomenon has frequently been referred to as focus (not to be confused with the usual sense of that term in linguistics). Furthermore, the choice of voice is influenced by the definiteness of the participants. The word order has a strong tendency to be verb-initial.
- In contrast, the more innovative Indonesian-type languages, which are particularly represented in Malaysia and western Indonesia, have reduced the voice system to a contrast between only two voices (actor voice and "undergoer" voice), but these are supplemented by applicative morphological devices (originally two: the more direct *-i and more oblique *-an/-[a]kən), which serve to modify the semantic role of the "undergoer". They are also characterized by the presence of preposed clitic pronouns. Unlike the Philippine type, these languages mostly tend towards verb-second word-orders. A number of languages, such as the Batak languages, Old Javanese, Balinese, Sasak and several Sulawesi languages seem to represent an intermediate stage between these two types.
- Finally, in some languages, which Ross calls "post-Indonesian", the original voice system has broken down completely and the voice-marking affixes no longer preserve their functions. Preposed possessor and transitional languages could also fall into this type.

Additional types of Austronesian languages include:

- Central Bornean-type languages, like the Indonesian type, have both actor voice and undergoer voice, but the latter are realised by a preverbal particle, and applicative voice are absent in these languages. Also, the nasal prefix does not mark any of aforementioned both voices. This type is represented by many indigenous languages of Borneo, such as Land Dayak, Kenyah, and Kayan–Murik branches.
- Preposed possessor languages, as the name suggests, place modifiers ("possessors") before the possessed objects ("possessum"), and lack original symmetrical voice. Most other languages construct them in reverse ("postposed possessor", a notable exception to this rule is Banggai). This type is represented by Austronesian languages of Timor, Maluku Islands, and Papua, as well as Malay trade and creole languages.
- Languages that have neither symmetrical voice nor preposed possessor construction are called transitional languages. Many of them have ergative–absolutive alignment and elaborate person marking, but they do not share core features in common. Some languages of Sumatra (e.g. Acehnese, Nias), the southern half of Sulawesi (e.g. Buginese, Makassarese, Muna, Banggai), and East Nusa Tenggara (e.g. Kambera) fall into this category.

== Lexicon ==
The Austronesian language family has been established by the linguistic comparative method on the basis of cognate sets, sets of words from multiple languages, which are similar in sound and meaning which can be shown to be descended from the same ancestral word in Proto-Austronesian according to regular rules. Some cognate sets are very stable. The word for eye in many Austronesian languages is mata (from the most northerly Austronesian languages, Formosan languages such as Bunun and Amis all the way south to Māori).

Other words are harder to reconstruct. The word for two is also stable, in that it appears over the entire range of the Austronesian family, but the forms (e.g. Bunun dusa; Amis tusa; Māori rua) require some linguistic expertise to recognise. The Austronesian Basic Vocabulary Database gives word lists (coded for cognateness) for approximately 1000 Austronesian languages.

== Classification ==
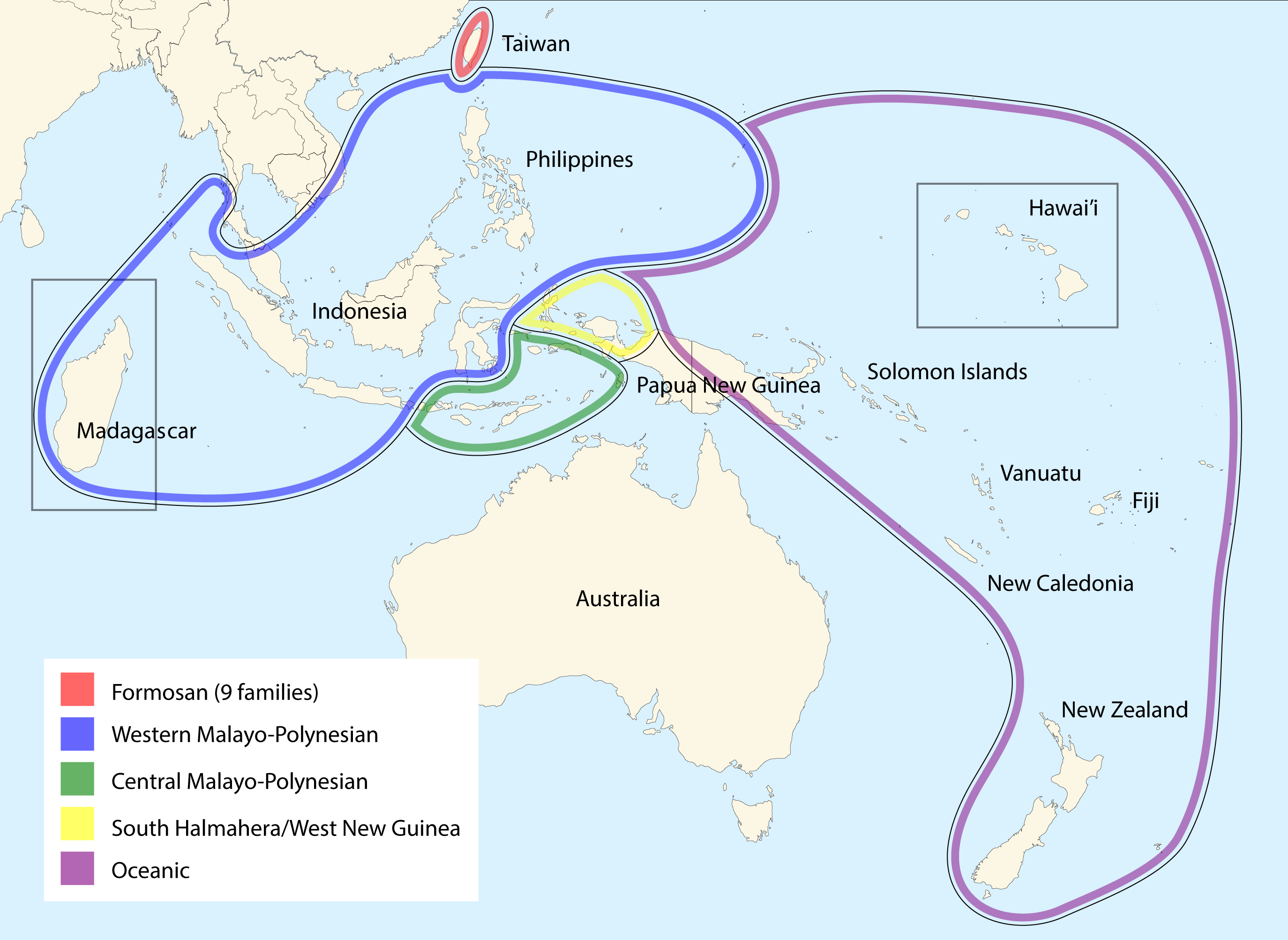
The distribution of the Austronesian languages, per Blust (1999). Western Malayo-Polynesian and Central Malayo-Polynesian are no longer accepted.

The internal structure of the Austronesian languages is complex. The family consists of many similar and closely related languages with large numbers of dialect continua, making it difficult to recognize boundaries between branches. The first major step towards high-order subgrouping was Dempwolff's recognition of the Oceanic subgroup (called Melanesisch by Dempwolff). The special position of the languages of Taiwan was first recognized by André-Georges Haudricourt (1965), who divided the Austronesian languages into three subgroups: Northern Austronesian (= Formosan), Eastern Austronesian (= Oceanic), and Western Austronesian (all remaining languages).

In a study that represents the first lexicostatistical classification of the Austronesian languages, Isidore Dyen (1965) presented a radically different subgrouping scheme. He posited 40 first-order subgroups, with the highest degree of diversity found in the area of Melanesia. The Oceanic languages are not recognized, but are distributed over more than 30 of his proposed first-order subgroups. Dyen's classification was widely criticized and for the most part rejected, but several of his lower-order subgroups are still accepted (e.g. the Cordilleran languages, the Bilic languages or the Murutic languages).

Subsequently, the position of the Formosan languages as the most archaic group of Austronesian languages was recognized by Otto Christian Dahl (1973), followed by proposals from other scholars that the Formosan languages actually make up more than one first-order subgroup of Austronesian. Robert Blust (1977) first presented the subgrouping model which is currently accepted by virtually all scholars in the field, with more than one first-order subgroup on Taiwan, and a single first-order branch encompassing all Austronesian languages spoken outside of Taiwan, viz. Malayo-Polynesian. The relationships of the Formosan languages to each other and the internal structure of Malayo-Polynesian continue to be debated.

=== Primary branches on Taiwan (Formosan languages) ===
In addition to Malayo-Polynesian, thirteen Formosan subgroups are broadly accepted. The seminal article in the classification of Formosan—and, by extension, the top-level structure of Austronesian—is Blust (1999). Prominent Formosanists (linguists who specialize in Formosan languages) take issue with some of its details, but it remains the point of reference for current linguistic analyses. Debate centers primarily around the relationships between these families. Of the classifications presented here, Blust (1999) links two families into a Western Plains group, two more in a Northwestern Formosan group, and three into an Eastern Formosan group, while Li (2008) also links five families into a Northern Formosan group. Harvey (1982), Chang (2006) and Ross (2012) split Tsouic, and Blust (2013) agrees the group is probably not valid.

Other studies have presented phonological evidence for a reduced Paiwanic family of Paiwanic, Puyuma, Bunun, Amis, and Malayo-Polynesian, but this is not reflected in vocabulary. The Eastern Formosan peoples Basay, Kavalan, and Amis share a homeland motif that has them coming originally from an island called Sinasay or Sanasay. The Amis, in particular, maintain that they came from the east, and were treated by the Puyuma, amongst whom they settled, as a subservient group.

==== Blust (1999) ====
Families of Formosan languages before Minnanese colonization of Taiwan, per Blust (1999)

- Formosan
  - Tsouic
    (abandoned in Blust 2013)
    - Tsou language
    - Saaroa language
    - Kanakanavu language
  - Western Plains
    - Thao language a.k.a. Sao: Brawbaw and Shtafari dialects
    - Central Western Plains
      - Babuza language; old Favorlang language: Taokas and Poavosa dialects
      - Papora-Hoanya language: Papora, Hoanya dialects
  - Northwest Formosan
    - Saisiyat language: Taai and Tungho dialects
    - Pazeh language and Kulun
  - Atayalic
    - Atayal language
    - Seediq language a.k.a. Truku/Taroko
  - East Formosan
    (based on a single merger, of pAN *n and *j)
    - Northern (Kavalanic languages)
      - Basay language: Trobiawa and Linaw–Qauqaut dialects
      - Kavalan language
      - Ketagalan language, or Ketangalan
    - Central (Ami)
      - Amis proper
      - Sakizaya
    - Siraya language
  - Bunun language
  - Rukai language
    - Mantauran, Tona, and Maga dialects of Rukai are divergent
  - Puyuma language
  - Paiwan language (south-eastern tip of Formosa)
  - (outside Formosa)
  - Malayo-Polynesian

==== Li (2008) ====
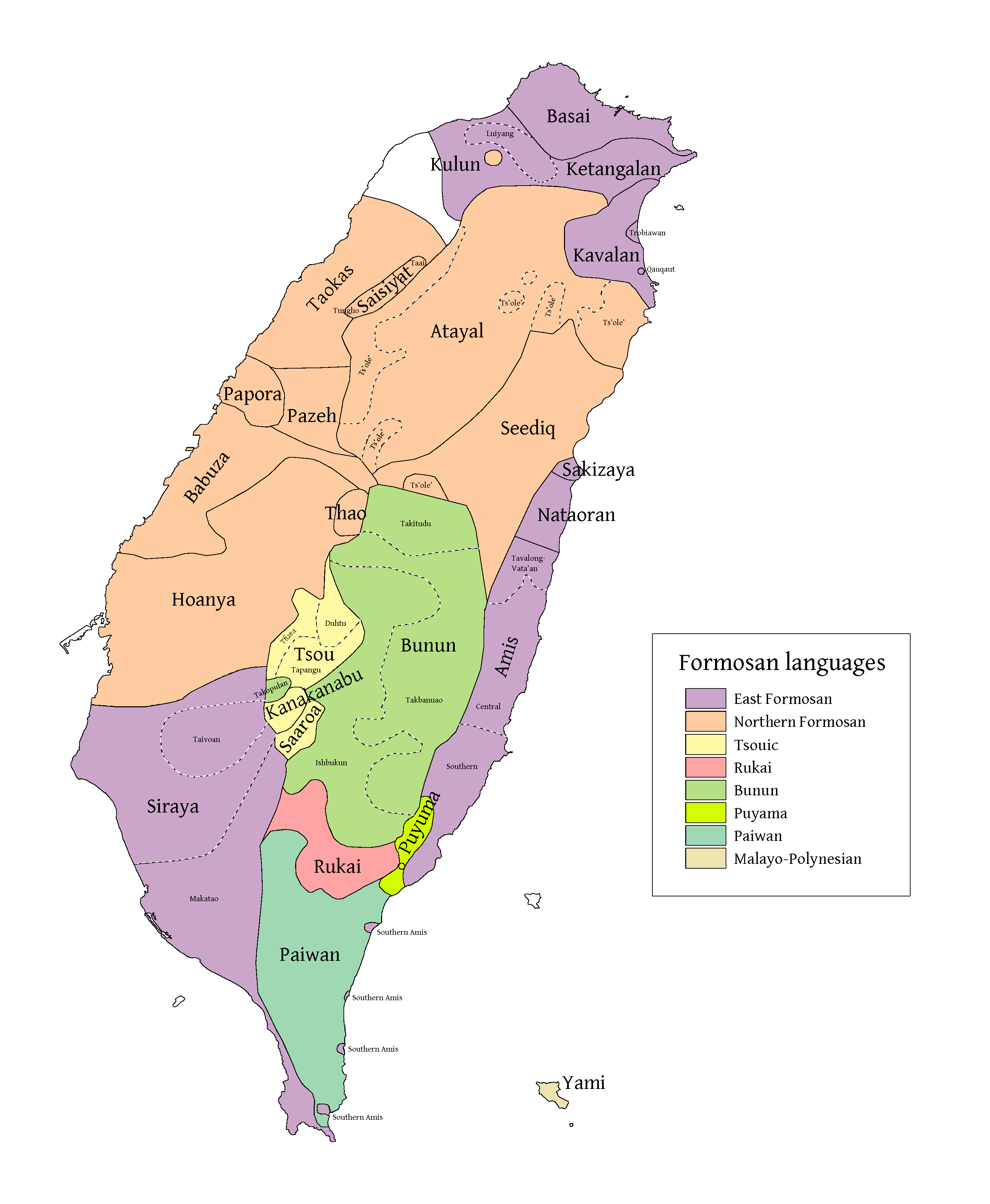
Families of Formosan languages before Minnanese colonization, per Li (2008). The three languages in green (Bunun, Puyuma, Paiwan) may form a Southern Formosan branch, but this is uncertain.

This classification retains Blust's East Formosan, and unites the other northern languages. Li (2008) proposes a Proto-Formosan (F0) ancestor and equates it with Proto-Austronesian (PAN), following the model in Starosta (1995). Rukai and Tsouic are seen as highly divergent, although the position of Rukai is highly controversial.

- Formosan
  - F0: Proto-Formosan = Proto-Austronesian
    - Rukai
      - Mantauran
      - Maga–Tona, Budai–Labuan–Taromak
  - F1: (unnamed branch)
    - Central (Tsouic)
      - Tsou
      - Southern Tsouic
        - Saaroa
        - Kanakanavu
  - F2: (unnamed branch)
    - Northern Formosan
      - Northwestern (Plains)
        - Saisiyat–Kulon, Pazeh
        - Western
          - Thao
          - West Coast (Papora–Hoanya–Babuza–Taokas)
      - Atayalic
        - Squliq Atayal
        - Tsʼoleʼ Atayal (= Cʼuliʼ)
        - Seediq
    - East Formosan
      - Kavalan–Basay
      - Siraya–Amis–Nataoran
      - Sakizaya
    - ? Southern [uncertain]
      - Bunun
        - Isbukun
        - Northern and Central (Takitudu and Takbanuaz)
      - Paiwan–Puyuma [uncertain]

==== Sagart (2004, 2021) ====
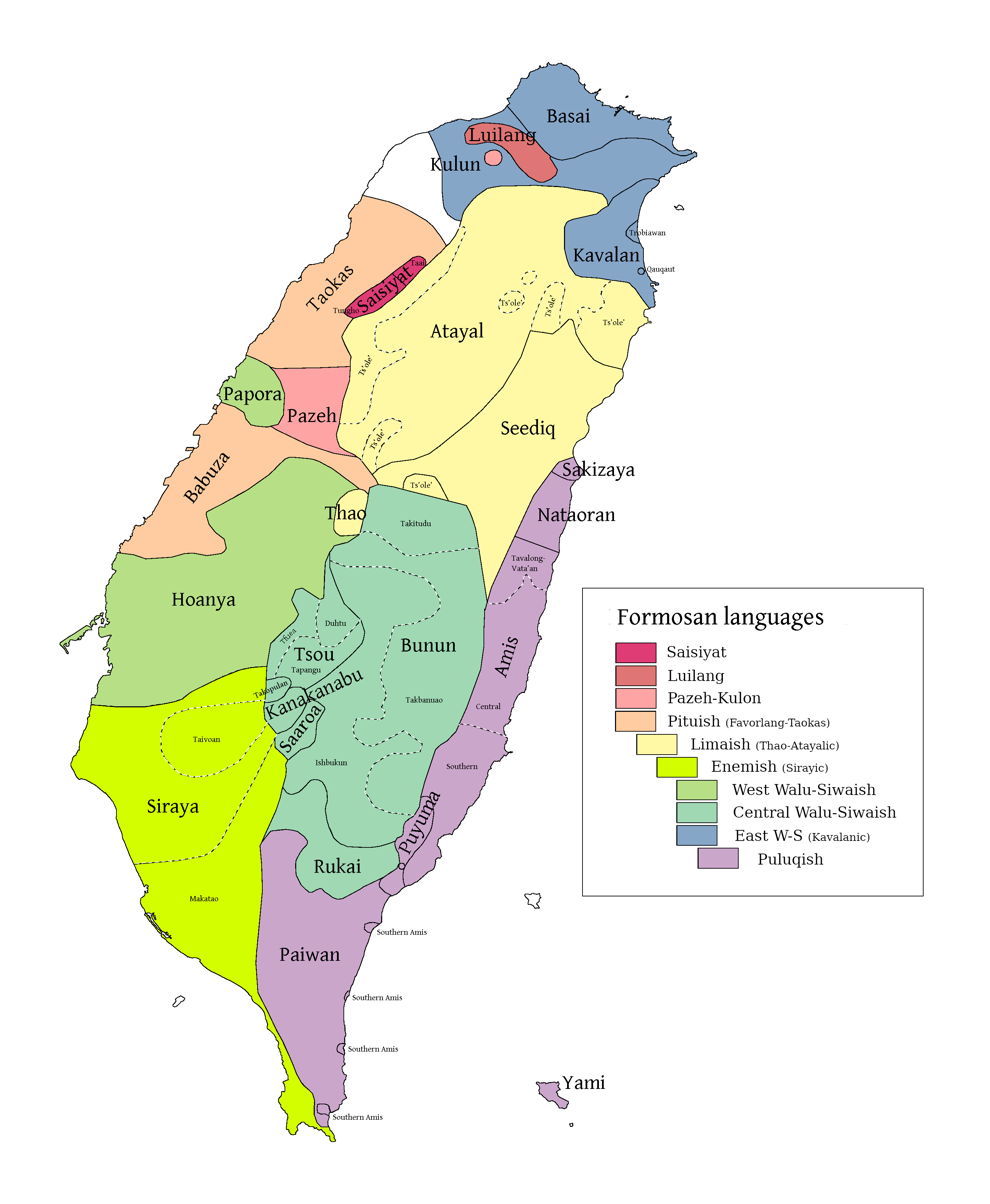
Nested branches of Austronesian languages according to Sagart. Languages colored red are outside the other branches but are not subgrouped. Kradai and Malayo-Polynesian would also be purple.

Sagart (2004) proposes that the numerals of the Formosan languages reflect a nested series of innovations, from languages in the northwest (near the putative landfall of the Austronesian migration from the mainland), which share only the numerals 1–4 with proto-Malayo-Polynesian, counter-clockwise to the eastern languages (purple on map), which share all numerals 1–10. Sagart (2021) finds other shared innovations that follow the same pattern. He proposes that pMP *lima 'five' is a lexical replacement (from 'hand'), and that pMP *pitu 'seven', *walu 'eight' and *Siwa 'nine' are contractions of pAN *RaCep 'five', a ligature *a or *i 'and', and *duSa 'two', *telu 'three', *Sepat 'four', an analogical pattern historically attested from Pazeh. The fact that the Kradai languages share the numeral system (and other lexical innovations) of pMP suggests that they are a coordinate branch with Malayo-Polynesian, rather than a sister family to Austronesian.

Sagart's resulting classification is:

- Austronesian (pAN c. 5200 BP)
  - Saisiyat
  - Luilang
  - Pazeh, Kulon
    (These four languages are outside Pituish, but Sagart is ambivalent as to any relationship among them, other than retaining Blust's connection between Pazeh and Kulon)
  - Pituish
    (pAN *RaCepituSa 'five-and-two' truncated to *pitu 'seven'; *sa-ŋ-aCu 'nine' [lit. one taken away])
    - Favorlang–Taokas
    - Limaish
      (pAN *RaCep 'five' replaced by *lima 'hand'; *Ca~ reduplication to form the series of numerals for counting humans)
      - Thao–Atayalic
      - Enemish
        (additive 'five-and-one' or 'twice-three' replaced by reduplicated *Nem-Nem > *emnem [*Nem 'three' is reflected in Basay, Siraya and Makatao]; pAN *kawaS 'year, sky' replaced by *CawiN)
        - Siraya
        - Walu-Siwaish
          (*walu 'eight' and *Siwa 'nine' from *RaCepat(e)lu 'five-and-three' and *RaCepiSepat 'five-and-four')
          - West WS: Papora–Hoanya
            (pAN *Sapuy 'fire' replaced by *[Z]apuR 'cooking fire'; pAN *qudem 'black replaced by *abi[Z]u, found in MP as 'blue')
          - Central WS
            (pAN *isa etc. 'one' replaced by *Ca~CiNi (reduplication of 'alone') in the human-counting series; pAN *iCit 'ten' replaced by *ma-sa-N 'one times'.)
            - Bunun
            - Rukai–Tsouic
              (CV~ reduplication in human-counting series replaced with competing pAN noun-marker *u- [unknown whether Bunun once had the same]; eleven lexical innovations such as *cáni 'one', *kəku 'leg')
          - East WS (pEWS c. 4500 BP)
            (innovations *baCaq-an 'ten'; *nanum 'water' alongside pAN *daNum)
            - Kavalanic languages
            - Puluqish
              (innovative *sa-puluq 'ten', from *sa- 'one' + 'separate, set aside'; use of prefixes *paka- and *maka- to mark abilitative)
              - Northern: Ami–Puyuma
                (*sasay 'one'; *mukeCep 'ten' for the human and non-human series; *ukak 'bone', *kuCem 'cloud')
              - Paiwan
              - Southern Austronesian (pSAN c. 4000 BP)
                (linker *atu 'and' > *at after *sa-puluq in numerals 11–19; lexical innovations such as *baqbaq 'mouth', *qa-sáuŋ 'canine tooth', *qi(d)zúR 'saliva', *píntu 'door', *-ŋel 'deaf')
                - Kra-Dai
                - Malayo-Polynesian

=== Malayo-Polynesian ===
The Malayo-Polynesian languages are—among other things—characterized by certain sound changes, such as the mergers of Proto-Austronesian (PAN) *t/*C to Proto-Malayo-Polynesian (PMP) *t, and PAN *n/*N to PMP *n, and the shift of PAN *S to PMP *h.

There appear to have been two great migrations of Austronesian languages that quickly covered large areas, resulting in multiple local groups with little large-scale structure. The first was Malayo-Polynesian, distributed across the Malay Archipelago and Melanesia. The second migration was that of the Oceanic languages into Polynesia and Micronesia.

== History ==
A map of the Austronesian expansion. Periods are based on archeological studies, though the association of the archeological record and linguistic reconstructions is disputed.

From the standpoint of historical linguistics, the place of origin (in linguistic terminology, Urheimat) of the Austronesian languages (Proto-Austronesian language) is most likely the main island of Taiwan, also known as Formosa; on this island the deepest divisions in Austronesian are found along small geographic distances, among the families of the native Formosan languages.

According to Robert Blust, the Formosan languages form nine of the ten primary branches of the Austronesian language family. Comrie (2001:28) noted this when he wrote:

... the internal diversity among the... Formosan languages... is greater than that in all the rest of Austronesian put together, so there is a major genetic split within Austronesian between Formosan and the rest... Indeed, the genetic diversity within Formosan is so great that it may well consist of several primary branches of the overall Austronesian family.

At least since Sapir (1968), writing in 1949, linguists have generally accepted that the chronology of the dispersal of languages within a given language family can be traced from the area of greatest linguistic variety to that of the least. For example, English in North America has large numbers of speakers, but relatively low dialectal diversity, while English in Great Britain has much higher diversity; such low linguistic variety by Sapir's thesis suggests a more recent spread of English in North America. While some scholars suspect that the number of principal branches among the Formosan languages may be somewhat less than Blust's estimate of nine (e.g. Li 2006), there is little contention among linguists with this analysis and the resulting view of the origin and direction of the migration. For a recent dissenting analysis, see Peiros (2004).

The protohistory of the Austronesian people can be traced farther back through time. To get an idea of the original homeland of the populations ancestral to the Austronesian peoples (as opposed to strictly linguistic arguments), evidence from archaeology and population genetics may be adduced. Studies from the science of genetics have produced conflicting outcomes. Some researchers find evidence for a proto-Austronesian homeland on the Asian mainland (e.g., Melton et al. 1998), while others mirror the linguistic research, rejecting an East Asian origin in favor of Taiwan (e.g., Trejaut et al. 2005). Archaeological evidence (e.g., Bellwood 1997) is more consistent, suggesting that the ancestors of the Austronesians spread from the Southern China to Taiwan at some time around 8,000 years ago.

Evidence from historical linguistics suggests that it is from this island that seafaring peoples migrated, perhaps in distinct waves separated by millennia, to the entire region encompassed by the Austronesian languages. It is believed that this migration began around 6,000 years ago. However, evidence from historical linguistics cannot bridge the gap between those two periods. The view that linguistic evidence connects Austronesian languages to the Sino-Tibetan ones, as proposed for example by Sagart (2002), is a minority one. As Fox (2004:8) states:

Implied in... discussions of subgrouping [of Austronesian languages] is a broad consensus that the homeland of the Austronesians was in Taiwan. This homeland area may have also included the P'eng-hu (Pescadores) islands between Taiwan and China and possibly even sites on the coast of mainland China, especially if one were to view the early Austronesians as a population of related dialect communities living in scattered coastal settlements.

Linguistic analysis of the Proto-Austronesian language stops at the western shores of Taiwan; any related mainland language(s) have not survived. The only exceptions, including the Chamic languages, derive from more recent migration to the mainland. However, according to Ostapirat's interpretation of the seriously discussed Austro-Tai hypothesis, the Kra–Dai languages (also known as Tai–Kadai) are exactly those related mainland languages.

== Hypothesized relations ==
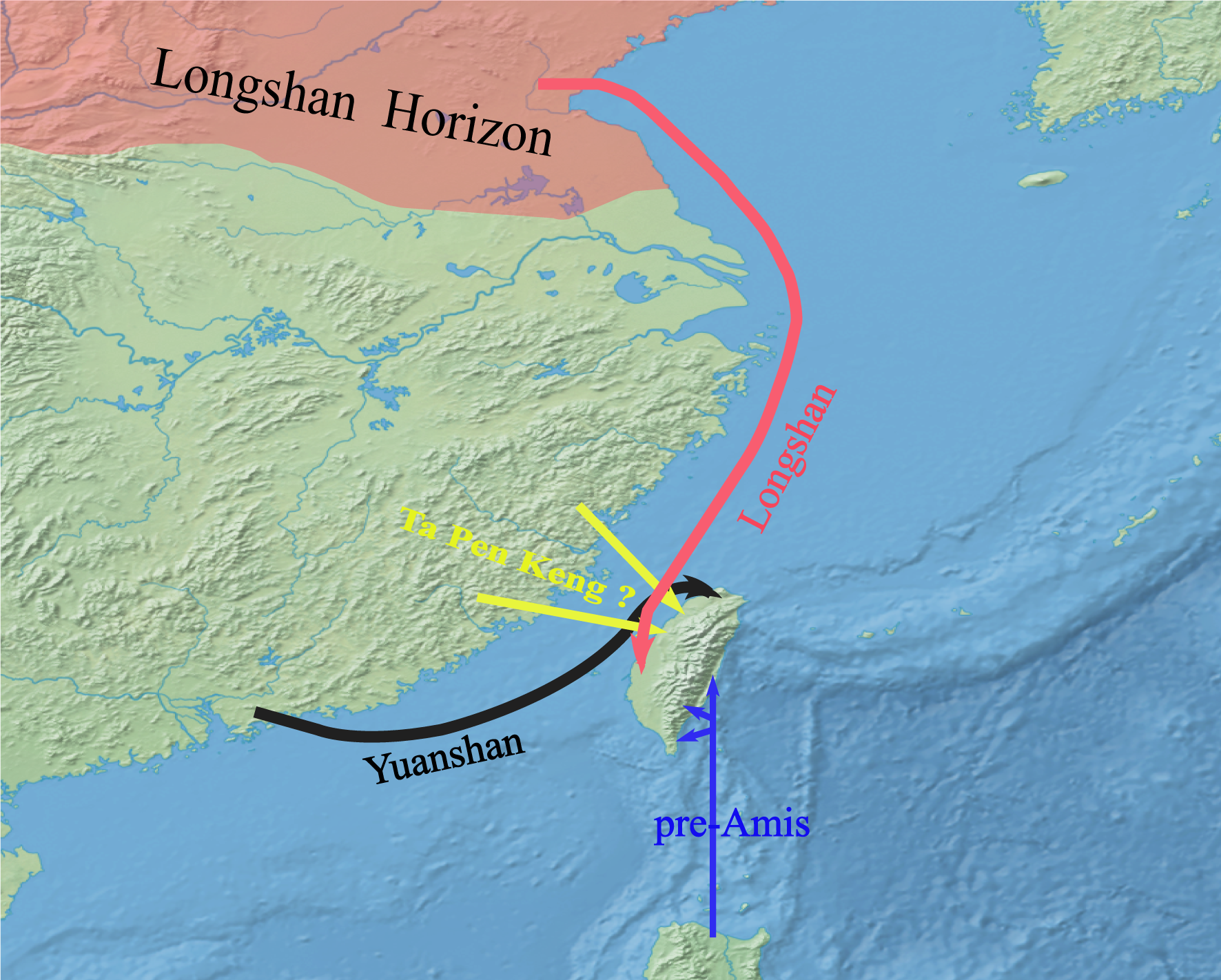
An example of hypothetical Pre-Austronesian migration waves to Taiwan from the mainland. (The Amis migration from the Philippines is controversial.)

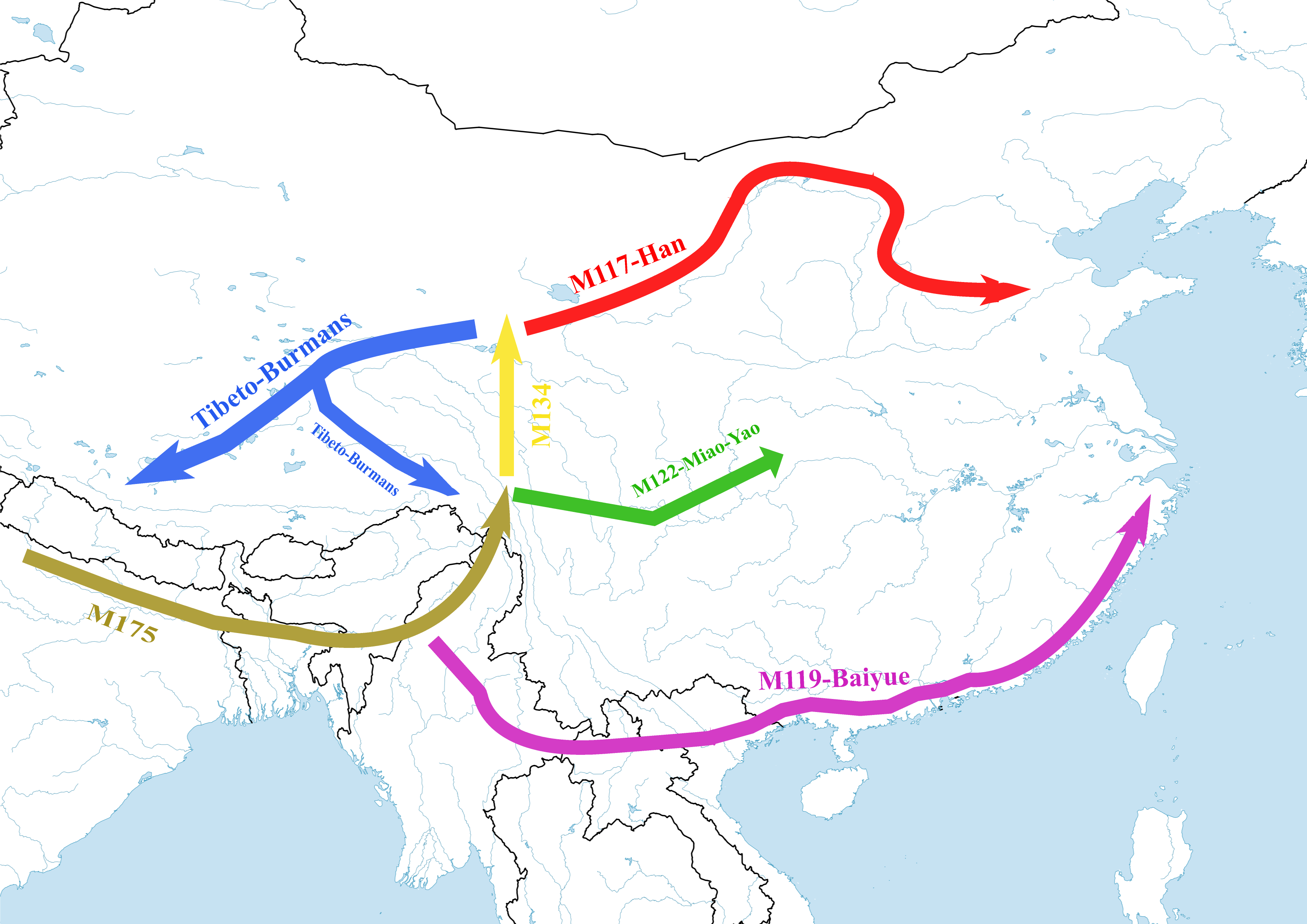
Path of Migration and Division of Some of the Major Ethnicities with their genetically distinctive markers, adapted from Edmondson and Gregerson (2007:732) . The sketched migration route M119-Baiyue from Southeast Asia corresponds to the southern origin hypothesis of early Austronesians.

Genealogical links have been proposed between Austronesian and various families of East and Southeast Asia.

=== Austro-Tai ===
The Austro-Tai language family is supported by Weera Ostapirat, Roger Blench, and Laurent Sagart based on the traditional comparative method. Ostapirat (2005) proposes a series of regular correspondences linking the two families and assumes a primary split, with Kra-Dai speakers being the people who stayed behind in their Chinese homeland. The following table shows the final consonant correspondences proposed in Ostapirat (2005).

Proto-Austronesian	Proto-Kra-Dai
*-p	*-p
*-t	*-t
*-k	*-k
*-q	*-k
*-C	*-C
*-s	*-c
*-b	*-w
*-d	*-y
*-g (?)	*-ɣ
*-m	*-m
*-n	*-n
*-ŋ	*-ŋ
*-N	*-N (> *-n, *-l)
*-R	*-R (> *-ɣ, *-l)
*-w	*-w
*-y	*-y
*-l	*-y

Blench (2004) suggests that, if the connection is valid, the relationship is unlikely to be one of two sister families. Rather, he suggests that proto-Kra-Dai speakers were Austronesians who migrated to Hainan Island and back to the mainland from the northern Philippines, and that their distinctiveness results from radical restructuring following contact with Hmong–Mien and Sinitic.

An earlier proposal linking Austronesian and the Kra-Dai languages of the southeastern continental Asian mainland by Paul K. Benedict included the Japonic languages as well. However, Benedict's work on Austro-Tai is plagued by issues in linguistic evidence and methodology, and was used to dismiss the Austro-Tai hypothesis until the recent work by Ostapirat and others.

=== Austric ===
A link with the Austroasiatic languages in an 'Austric' phylum is based mostly on typological evidence. However, there is also morphological evidence of a connection between the conservative Nicobarese languages and Austronesian languages of the Philippines. Robert Blust supports the hypothesis which connects the lower Yangtze neolithic Austro-Tai entity with the rice-cultivating Austro-Asiatic cultures, assuming the center of East Asian rice domestication, and putative Austric homeland, to be located in the Yunnan/Burma border area. Under that view, there was an east-west genetic alignment, resulting from a rice-based population expansion, in the southern part of East Asia: Austroasiatic-Kra-Dai-Austronesian, with unrelated Sino-Tibetan occupying a more northerly tier.

=== Sino-Austronesian ===
French linguist and Sinologist Laurent Sagart considers the Austronesian languages to be related to the Sino-Tibetan languages, and also groups the Kra–Dai languages as more closely related to the Malayo-Polynesian languages. Sagart argues for a north-south genetic relationship between Chinese and Austronesian, based on sound correspondences in the basic vocabulary and morphological parallels. Laurent Sagart (2017) concludes that the possession of the two kinds of millets (Note: Setaria italica and Panicum miliaceum.) in Taiwanese Austronesian languages (not just Setaria, as previously thought) places the pre-Austronesians in northeastern China, adjacent to the probable Sino-Tibetan homeland. Sagart also groups the Austronesian languages in a recursive-like fashion, placing Kra-Dai as a sister branch of Malayo-Polynesian. His methodology has been found to be spurious by his peers.

=== Japanese ===
Several linguists have proposed that Japanese is genetically related to the Austronesian family, cf. Benedict (1990), Matsumoto (1975), Miller (1967).

Some other linguists think it is more plausible that Japanese is not genetically related to the Austronesian languages, but instead was influenced by an Austronesian substratum or adstratum.

Those who propose this scenario suggest that the Austronesian family once covered the islands to the north as well as to the south. Martine Robbeets (2017) claims that Japanese genetically belongs to the "Transeurasian" (= Macro-Altaic) languages, but underwent lexical influence from "para-Austronesian", a presumed sister language of Proto-Austronesian.

=== Ongan ===
Blevins (2007) proposed that the Austronesian and the Ongan protolanguage are the descendants of an Austronesian–Ongan protolanguage. This view is not supported by mainstream linguists and remains very controversial. Robert Blust rejects Blevins' proposal as far-fetched and based solely on chance resemblances and methodologically flawed comparisons.

== Writing systems ==
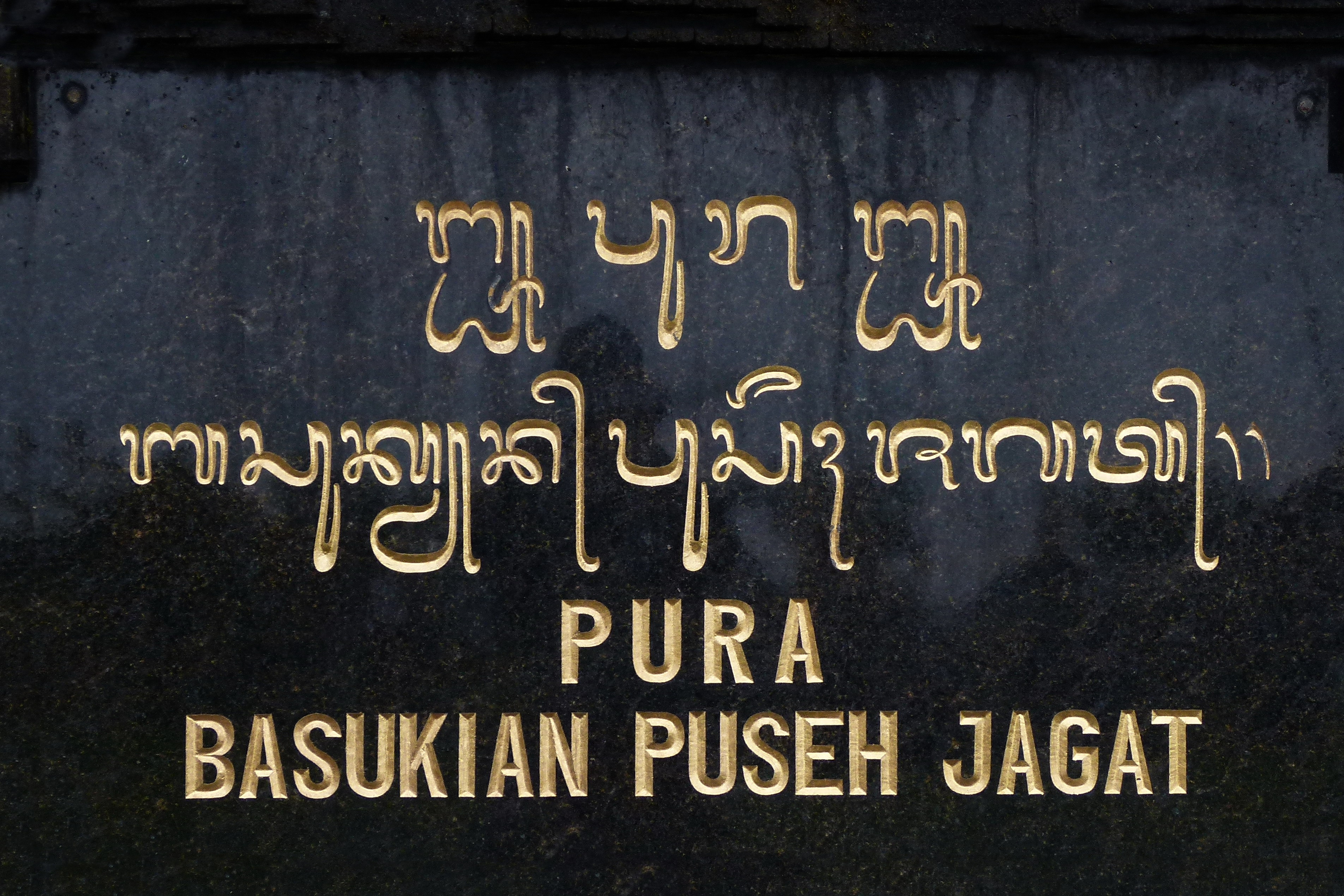
A sign in Balinese and Latin script at a Hindu temple in Bali

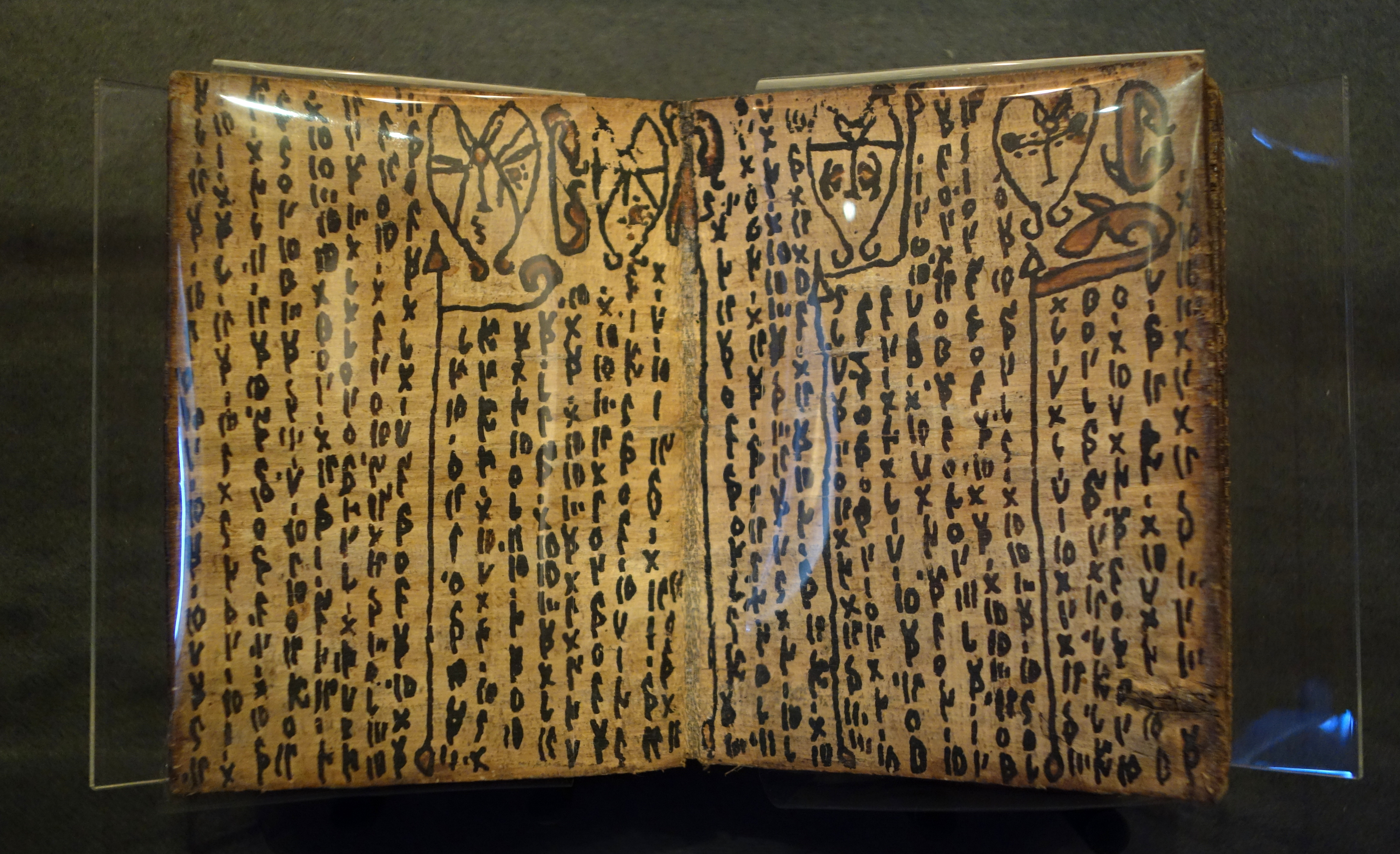
A manuscript from the early 1800s using the Batak script

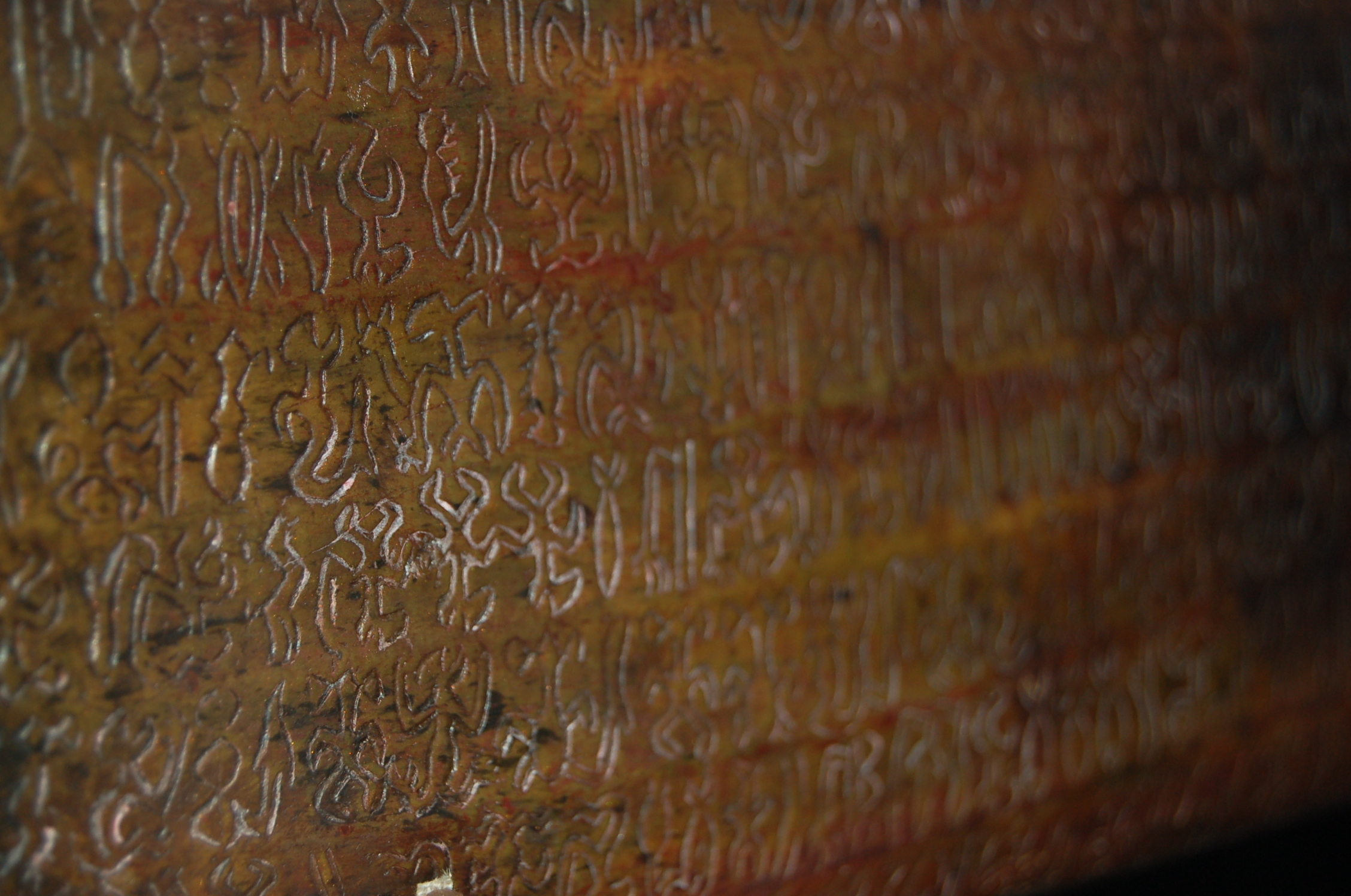
Rongorongo glyph, assumed to be the writing system of the Rapa Nui language

Most Austronesian languages have Latin-based writing systems today. Some non-Latin-based writing systems include:

- Brahmi script
  - Kawi script
    - Balinese alphabet – used to write Balinese, Kawi, Malay, Sasak, and Sanskrit.
    - Batak alphabet – used to write several Batak languages.
    - Baybayin – used to write Tagalog and several Philippine languages.
    - Bima alphabet – once used to write the Bima language.
    - Buhid alphabet – used to write Buhid language.
    - Hanunó'o alphabet – used to write Hanuno'o language.
    - Javanese script – used to write the Javanese language and several neighbouring languages like Madurese.
    - Kerinci alphabet (Kaganga) – used to write the Kerinci language.
    - Kulitan alphabet – used to write the Kapampangan language.
    - Lampung alphabet – used to write Lampung and Komering.
    - Lontara alphabet – used to write the Buginese, Makassarese and several languages of Sulawesi.
    - Sundanese script – standardized script based on Old Sundanese script, used to write the Sundanese language.
    - Rejang alphabet – used to write the Rejang language.
    - Rencong alphabet – once used to write the Malay language in Sumatra.
    - Tagbanwa alphabet – once used to write various Palawan languages.
    - Lota alphabet – used to write the Ende-Li'o language.
  - Cham alphabet – used to write Cham language.
  - Thai script – used to write Pattani Malay language.
- Arabic script
  - Pegon alphabet – used to write Javanese, Sundanese and Madurese as well as several smaller neighbouring languages.
  - Jawi alphabet – used to write Malay, Acehnese, Banjar, Minangkabau, Maguindanao, Tausug, Western Cham and others.
  - Sorabe alphabet – once used to write several dialects of Malagasy language.
- Hangul – used to write the Cia-Cia language.
- Dunging – used to write the Iban language
- Avoiuli – used to write the Raga language.
- Eskayan – used to write the Eskayan language, a secret language based on Boholano.
- Woleai script (Caroline Island script) – used to write the Carolinian language (Refaluwasch).
- Rongorongo – possibly used to write the Rapa Nui language.
- Gagarit Abada – used to write Dusunic languages but it was not widely used.
- Gangga Melayu – used to write Perak Malay.
- Braille – used in Filipino, Malay, Indonesian, Tolai, Motu, Māori, Samoan, Malagasy, and many other Austronesian languages.

== Comparison charts ==
Below are two charts comparing list of numbers of 1–10 and thirteen words in Austronesian languages; spoken in Taiwan, the Philippines, the Mariana Islands, Indonesia, Malaysia, Chams or Champa (in Thailand, Cambodia, and Vietnam), East Timor, Papua, New Zealand, Hawaii, Madagascar, Borneo, Kiribati, Caroline Islands, and Tuvalu.

Comparison chart-numerals
Austronesian List of Numbers 1–10	0	1	2	3	4	5	6	7	8	9	10
Proto-Austronesian		*əsa *isa	*duSa	*təlu	*Səpat	*lima	*ənəm	*pitu	*walu	*Siwa	*(sa-)puluq
Formosan languages	0	1	2	3	4	5	6	7	8	9	10
Atayal		qutux	sazing	cyugal	payat	magal	mtzyu / tzyu	mpitu / pitu	mspat / spat	mqeru / qeru	mopuw / mpuw
Seediq		kingal	daha	teru	sepac	rima	mmteru	mpitu	mmsepac	mngari	maxal
Truku		kingal	dha	tru	spat	rima	mataru	empitu	maspat	mngari	maxal
Thao		taha	tusha	turu	shpat	tarima	katuru	pitu	kashpat	tanathu	makthin
Papora		tal	nya	turu	pat	lima	lum	pitu	halu	siya	ci
Hoanya		mital	misa	miru	mipal	lima	rom	pito	talo	asia	myataisi
Babuza		nata	naroa	natool'a	napat	nahup	natap	natu	maaspat	nataxaxoan	tsihet
Favorlang		natta	narroa	natorra	naspat	nachab	nataap	naito	maaspat	tannacho	tschiet
Taokas		tatanu	rua	tool'a	lapat	hasap	tahap	yuweto	mahalpat	tanaso	tais'id
Pazeh/Kaxabu		adang	dusa	tu'u	supat	xasep	xasebuza	xasebidusa	xasebitu'u	xasebisupat	isit
Saisiyat		'aeihae'	roSa'	to:lo'	Sopat	haseb	SayboSi:	SayboSi: 'aeihae'	maykaSpat	hae'hae'	lampez / langpez
Tsou		coni	yuso	tuyu	sʉptʉ	eimo	nomʉ	pitu	voyu	sio	maskʉ
Hla'alua		canni	suua	tuulu	paatʉ	kulima	kʉnʉmʉ	kupitu	kualu	kusia	kumaahlʉ
Kanakanavu		cani	cusa	turu	sʉʉpatʉ	rima	nʉmʉ	pitu	aru	sia	maan
Bunun		tasʔa	dusa	tau	paat	hima	nuum	pitu	vau	siva	masʔan
Rukai		itha	drusa	tulru	supate	lrima	eneme	pitu	valru	bangate	pulruku / mangealre
Paiwan		ita	drusa	tjelu	sepatj	lima	enem	pitju	alu	siva	tapuluq
Puyuma		sa	druwa	telu	pat	lima	unem	pitu	walu	iwa	pulu
Kavalan		usiq	uzusa	utulu	uspat	ulima	unem	upitu	uwalu	usiwa	rabtin
Basay		ca	lusa	cuu	səpat	cima	anəm	pitu	wacu	siwa	labatan
Amis		cecay	tosa	tolo	sepat	lima	enem	pito	falo	siwa	polo' / mo^tep
Amis ('Amisay)		cacay	tusa	tulu	sepat	lima	enem	pitu	walu	siwa	pulu' / muketep
Sakizaya		cacay	tusa	tulu	sepat	lima	enem	pitu	walu	siwa	cacay a bataan
Siraya		sasaat	duha	turu	tapat	tu-rima	tu-num	pitu	pipa	kuda	keteng
Siraya (Moatao)		isa	rusa	tao	usipat	hima	lomu	pitu	vao	siva	masu
Taivoan		tsaha'	ruha	toho	paha'	hima	lom	kito'	kipa'	matuha	kaipien
Taivoan (Suannsamna)		sa'a	zua	to'o	sipat	rima	rumu	pitu	waru	siya	kaitian
Makatao		na-saad	ra-ruha	ra-ruma	ra-sipat	ra-lima	ra-hurum	ra-pito	ra-haru	ra-siwa	ra-kaitian
Qauqaut		is	zus	dor	sop	rim	ən	pit	ar	siw	tor
Malayo-Polynesian languages	0	1	2	3	4	5	6	7	8	9	10
Proto-Malayo-Polynesian		*əsa *isa	*duha	*təlu	*əpat	*lima	*ənəm	*pitu	*walu	*siwa	*puluq
Yami(Tao)		asa	adoa	atlo	apat	alima	anem	apito	awao	asiam	asa ngernan
Acehnese	sifar soh	sa	duwa	lhee	peuet	limong	nam	tujoh	lapan	sikureueng	siploh
Balinese^{a}	nul	siki besik	kalih dua	tiga telu	papat	lima	nenem	pitu	kutus	sia	dasa
Banjar		asa	dua	talu	ampat	lima	anam	pitu	walu	sanga	sapuluh
Batak, Toba		sada	dua	tolu	opat	lima	onom	pitu	ualu	sia	sampulu
Buginese		séddi	dua	tellu	eppa’	lima	enneng	pitu	arua	aséra	seppulo
Cia-Cia		dise ise	rua ghua	tolu	pa'a	lima	no'o	picu	walu oalu	siua	ompulu
Cham		sa	dua	klau	pak	lima	nam	tujuh	dalapan	salapan	sapluh
Old Javanese		sa/tunggal	rwa	tĕlu	pāt	lima	nĕm	pitu	wwalu	sanga	sapuluh
Javanese	nol	siji; satunggal	loro; kalih	telu; tiga	papat; sekawan	lima; gangsal	enem	pitu	wolu	sanga	sapuluh
Kelantan-Pattani	kosong	so	duwo	tigo	pak	limo	ne	tujoh	lape	smile	spuloh
Komering	nul	osay	ruwa	tolu	pak	lima	nom	pitu	walu	suway	puluh
Madurese	nol	settong	dhuwa'	tello'	empa'	lema'	ennem	petto'	ballu'	sanga'	sapolo
Makassarese	lobbang nolo'	se're	rua	tallu	appa'	lima	annang	tuju	sangantuju	salapang	sampulo
Indonesian/Malay	kosong; sifar; nol	sa/se satu suatu	dua	tiga	empat	lima	enam	tujuh	delapan lapan	sembilan	sepuluh
Minangkabau		ciek	duo	tigo	ampek	limo	anam	tujuah	salapan	sambilan	sapuluah
Moken		c^{h}a:_{?}	t^{h}uwa:_{?}	teloj (təlɔy)	pa:t	lema:_{?}	nam	luɟuːk	waloj (walɔy)	chewaj (cʰɛwaːy / sɛwaːy)	c^{e}poh
Rejang		do	duai	tlau	pat	lêmo	num	tujuak	dêlapên	sêmbilan	sêpuluak
Sasak		sekek	due	telo	empat	lime	enam	pituk	baluk	siwak	sepulu
Old Sundanese		sa-, hiji, ésé	dwa, dua	teulu	opat	lima	genep	tujuh	dalapan	salapan	sapuluh
Sundanese	enol	hiji	dua	tilu	opat	lima	genep	tujuh	dalapan	salapan	sapuluh
Terengganu Malay	kosong	se	duwe	tige	pak	lime	nang	tujoh	lapang	smilang	spuloh
Tetun	nol	ida	rua	tolu	hat	lima	nen	hitu	ualu	sia	sanulu
Tsat (HuiHui)^{c}		sa˧ ^{*} ta˩ ^{**}	tʰua˩	kiə˧	pa˨˦	ma˧	naːn˧˨	su˥	paːn˧˨	tʰu˩ paːn˧˨	piu˥
There are two forms for numbers 'one' in Tsat (Hui Hui; Hainan Cham) :^* The word sa˧ is used for serial counting.^** The word ta˩ is used with hundreds and thousands and before qualifiers.
Ilocano	ibbong awan	maysa	dua	tallo	uppat	lima	innem	pito	walo	siam	sangapulo
Ibanag	awan	tadday	duwa	tallu	appa'	lima	annam	pitu	walu	siyam	mafulu
Pangasinan		sakey	duwa	talo	apat	lima	anem	pito	walo	siyam	samplo
Kapampangan	alá	métung/ isá	adwá	atlú	ápat	limá	ánam	pitú	walú	siám	apúlu
Tagalog	walâ	isá	dalawá	tatló	apat	limá	anim	pitó	waló	siyám	sampû
Bikol	warâ	sarô	duwá	tuló	apát	limá	anóm	pitó	waló	siyám	sampulò
Aklanon	uwa	isaea sambilog	daywa	tatlo	ap-at	lima	an-om	pito	waeo	siyam	napueo
Karay-a	wara	(i)sara	darwa	tatlo	apat	lima	anəm	pito	walo	siyam	napulo
Onhan		isya	darwa	tatlo	upat	lima	an-om	pito	walo	siyam	sampulo
Romblomanon		isá	duhá	tuyó	upát	limá	onúm	pitó	wayó	siyám	napuyò
Masbatenyo		isád usád	duwá duhá	tuló	upát	limá	unóm	pitó	waló	siyám	napulò
Hiligaynon	walâ	isá	duhá	tatló	apat	limá	anom	pitó	waló	siyám	napulò
Cebuano	walâ	usá	duhá	tuló	upát	limá	unóm	pitó	waló	siyám	napulò pulò
Waray	waráy	usá	duhá	tuló	upát	limá	unóm	pitó	waló	siyám	napulò
Tausug	sipar	isa	duwa	tū	upat	lima	unum	pitu	walu	siyam	hangpu'
Maranao		isa	dowa	təlo	pat	lima	nəm	pito	walo	siyaw	sapolo
Benuaq (Dayak Benuaq)		eray	duaq	toluu	opaat	limaq	jawatn	turu	walo	sie	sepuluh
Lun Bawang/ Lundayeh	na luk dih	eceh	dueh	teluh	epat	limeh	enem	tudu'	waluh	liwa'	pulu'
Dusun	aiso	iso	duo	tolu	apat	limo	onom	turu	walu	siam	hopod
Malagasy	aotra	isa iray	roa	telo	efatra	dimy	enina	fito	valo	sivy	folo
Sangirese (Sangir-Minahasan)		sembau	darua	tatelu	epa	lima	eneng	pitu	walu	sio	mapulo
Biak	bei	oser	suru	kyor	fyak	rim	wonem	fik	war	siw	samfur
Oceanic languages^{d}	0	1	2	3	4	5	6	7	8	9	10
Chuukese		eet	érúúw	één	fáán	niim	woon	fúús	waan	ttiw	engoon
Fijian	saiva	dua	rua	tolu	vaa	lima	ono	vitu	walu	ciwa	tini
Gilbertese	akea	teuana	uoua	tenua	aua	nimaua	onoua	itua	wanua	ruaiwa	tebwina
Hawaiian	'ole	'e-kahi	'e-lua	'e-kolu	'e-hā	'e-lima	'e-ono	'e-hiku	'e-walu	'e-iwa	'umi
Māori	kore	tahi	rua	toru	whā	rima	ono	whitu	waru	iwa	tekau ngahuru
Marshallese	o̧o	juon	ruo	jilu	emān	ļalem	jiljino	jimjuon	ralitōk	ratimjuon	jon̄oul
Motu^{e}		ta	rua	toi	hani	ima	tauratoi	hitu	taurahani	taurahani-ta	gwauta
Niuean	nakai	taha	ua	tolu	fā	lima	ono	fitu	valu	hiva	hogofulu
Rapanui		tahi	rua	toru	hā	rima	ono	hitu	va'u	iva	angahuru
Rarotongan Māori	kare	ta'i	rua	toru	'ā	rima	ono	'itu	varu	iva	nga'uru
Rotuman		ta	rua	folu	hake	lima	ono	hifu	vạlu	siva	saghulu
Samoan	o	tasi	lua	tolu	fa	lima	ono	fitu	valu	iva	sefulu
Samoan (K-type)	o	kasi	lua	kolu	fa	lima	ogo	fiku	valu	iva	sefulu
Tahitian		hō'ē tahi	piti	toru	maha	pae	ōno	hitu	va'u	iva	hō'ē 'ahuru
Tongan	noa	taha	ua	tolu	fa	nima	ono	fitu	valu	hiva	hongofulu taha noa
Tuvaluan		tahi tasi	lua	tolu	fa	lima	ono	fitu	valu	iva	sefulu
Yapese	dæriiy dæriiq	t’aareeb	l’ugruw	dalip	anngeeg	laal	neel’	medlip	meeruuk	meereeb	ragaag

Comparison chart-thirteen words
English	one	two	three	four	person	house	dog	road	day	new	we	what	fire
Proto-Austronesian	*əsa, *isa	*duSa	*təlu	*əpat	*Cau	*balay, *Rumaq	*asu	*zalan	*qaləjaw, *waRi	*baqəRu	*kita, *kami	*anu, *apa	*Sapuy
Tetum	ida	rua	tolu	haat	ema	uma	asu	dalan	loron	foun	ita	saida	ahi
Amis	cecay	tosa	tolo	sepat	tamdaw	luma	wacu	lalan	cidal	faroh	kita	uman	namal
Puyuma	sa	dua	telu	pat	taw	rumah	soan	dalan	wari	vekar	mi	amanai	apue, asi
Tagalog	isa	dalawa	tatlo	apat	tao	bahay	aso	daan	araw	bago	tayo / kami	ano	apoy
Bikol	sarô	duwá	tuló	apát	táwo	haróng	áyam	dalan	aldáw	bàgo	kitá/kami	anó	kaláyo
Rinconada Bikol	əsad	darwā	tolō	əpat	tawō	baləy	ayam	raran	aldəw	bāgo	kitā	onō	kalayō
Waray	usa	duha	tulo	upat	tawo	balay	ayam, ido	dalan	adlaw	bag-o	kita	anu	kalayo
Cebuano	usa, isa	duha	tulo	upat	tawo	balay	iro	dalan	adlaw	bag-o	kita	unsa	kalayo
Hiligaynon	isa	duha	tatlo	apat	tawo	balay	ido	dalan	adlaw	bag-o	kita	ano	kalayo
Aklanon	isaea, sambilog	daywa	tatlo	ap-at	tawo	baeay	ayam	daean	adlaw	bag-o	kita	ano	kaeayo
Kinaray-a	(i)sara	darwa	tatlo	apat	tawo	balay	ayam	dalan	adlaw	bag-o	kita	ano	kalayo
Tausug	hambuuk	duwa	tu	upat	tau	bay	iru'	dan	adlaw	ba-gu	kitaniyu	unu	kayu
Maranao	isa	dowa	təlo	pat	taw	walay	aso	lalan	gawi’i	bago	səkita/səkami	antona’a	apoy
Kapampangan	métung	adwá	atlú	ápat	táu	balé	ásu	dálan	aldó	báyu	íkatamu	nánu	apî
Pangasinan	sakey	dua, duara	talo, talora	apat, apatira	too	abong	aso	dalan	ageo	balo	sikatayo	anto	pool
Ilokano	maysa	dua	tallo	uppat	tao	balay	aso	kalsada	aldaw	baro	dakami	ania	apuy
Ivatan	asa	dadowa	tatdo	apat	tao	vahay	chito	rarahan	araw	va-yo	yaten	ango	apoy
Ibanag	tadday	dua	tallu	appa'	tolay	balay	kitu	dalan	aggaw	bagu	sittam	anni	afi
Yogad	tata	addu	tallu	appat	tolay	binalay	atu	daddaman	agaw	bagu	sikitam	gani	afuy
Gaddang	antet	addwa	tallo	appat	tolay	balay	atu	dallan	aw	bawu	ikkanetam	sanenay	afuy
Tboli	sotu	lewu	tlu	fat	tau	gunu	ohu	lan	kdaw	lomi	tekuy	tedu	ofih
Lun Bawang/ Lundayeh	eceh	dueh	teluh	epat	lemulun/lun	ruma'	uko'	dalan	eco	beruh	teu	enun	apui
Indonesian/Malay	sa/se, satu, suatu	dua	tiga	empat	orang	rumah, balai	anjing	jalan	hari	baru	kita, kami	apa, anu	api
Old Javanese	esa, eka	rwa, dwi	tĕlu, tri	pat, catur	wwang	umah	asu	dalan	dina	hañar, añar	kami	apa, aparan	apuy, agni
Javanese	siji, setunggal	loro, kalih	tĕlu, tiga	papat, sekawan	uwong, tiyang, priyantun	omah, griya, dalem	asu, sĕgawon	dalan, gili	dina, dinten	anyar, énggal	awaké dhéwé, kula panjenengan	apa, punapa	gĕni, latu, brama
Old Sundanese	hiji, ésé	dua	teulu	opat	urang	imah, bumi	anjing, basu	jalan	poé	bahayu	urang	naha, nahaeun	apuy
Sundanese	hiji, saésé	dua	tilu, talu, tolu	opat	urang, jalma, jalmi, manusa	imah, rorompok, bumi	anjing	jalan	poé	anyar, énggal	urang, arurang	naon, nahaon	seuneu, api
Acehnese	sa	duwa	lhèë	peuët	ureuëng	rumoh, balè, seuëng	asèë	röt	uroë	barô	(geu)tanyoë	peuë	apui
Minangkabau	ciek	duo	tigo	ampek	urang	rumah	anjiang	labuah, jalan	hari	baru	awak	apo	api
Rejang	do	duai	tlau	pat	tun	umêak	kuyuk	dalên	bilai	blau	itê	jano, gen, inê	opoi
Lampungese	sai	khua	telu	pak	jelema	lamban	kaci	ranlaya	khani	baru	kham	api	apui
Komering	osay	ruwa	tolu	pak	jolma	lombahan	asu	ranggaya	harani	anyar ompay	ram sikam kita	apiya	apuy
Buginese	se'di	dua	tellu	eppa'	tau	bola	asu	laleng	esso	baru	idi'	aga	api
Temuan	satuk	duak	tigak	empat	uwang, eang	gumah, umah	anying, koyok	jalan	aik, haik	bahauk	kitak	apak	apik
Toba Batak	sada	dua	tolu	opat	halak	jabu	biang, asu	dalan	ari	baru	hita	aha	api
Kelantan-Pattani	so	duwo	tigo	pak	oghe	ghumoh, dumoh	anjing	jale	aghi	baghu	kito	gapo	api
Biak	oser	suru	kyor	fyak	snon	rum	naf, rofan	nyan	ras	babo	nu, nggo	sa, masa	for
Chamorro	håcha, maisa	hugua	tulu	fatfat	taotao/tautau	guma'	ga'lågu	chålan	ha'åni	på'go, nuebu	hami, hita	håfa	guåfi
Motu	ta, tamona	rua	toi	hani	tau	ruma	sisia	dala	dina	matamata	ita, ai	dahaka	lahi
Māori	tahi	rua	toru	whā	tangata	whare	kurī	ara	rā	hou	tāua, tātou/tātau māua, mātou/mātau	aha	ahi
Gilbertese	teuana	uoua	tenua	aua	aomata	uma, bata, auti (from house)	kamea, kiri	kawai	bong	bou	ti	tera, -ra (suffix)	ai
Tuvaluan	tasi	lua	tolu	fá	toko	fale	kuli	ala, tuu	aso	fou	tāua	a	afi
Hawaiian	kahi	lua	kolu	hā	kanaka	hale	'īlio	ala	ao	hou	kākou	aha	ahi
Banjarese	asa	duwa	talu	ampat	urang	rūmah	hadupan	heko	hǎri	hanyar	kami	apa	api
Malagasy	isa	roa	telo	efatra	olona	trano	alika	lalana	andro	vaovao	isika	inona	afo
Dusun	iso	duo	tolu	apat	tulun	walai, lamin	tasu	ralan	tadau	wagu	tokou	onu/nu	tapui
Kadazan	iso	duvo	tohu	apat	tuhun	hamin	tasu	lahan	tadau	vagu	tokou	onu, nunu	tapui
Rungus	iso	duvo	tolu, tolzu	apat	tulun, tulzun	valai, valzai	tasu	dalan	tadau	vagu	tokou	nunu	tapui, apui
Sungai/Tambanuo	ido	duo	tolu	opat	lobuw	waloi	asu	ralan	runat	wagu	toko	onu	apui
Iban	satu, sa, siti, sigi	dua	tiga	empat	orang, urang	rumah	ukui, uduk	jalai	hari	baru	kitai	nama	api
Sarawak Malay	satu, sigek	dua	tiga	empat	orang	rumah	asuk	jalan	ari	baru	kita	apa	api
Terengganuan	se	duwe	tige	pak	oghang	ghumoh, dumoh	anjing	jalang	aghi	baghu	kite	mende, ape, gape, nape	api
Kanayatn	sa	dua	talu	ampat	urakng	rumah	asu'	jalatn	ari	baru	kami', diri'	ahe	api
Yapese	t’aareeb	l’ugruw	dalip	anngeeg	beaq	noqun	kuus	kanaawooq	raan	beqeech	gamow	maang	nifiiy

== See also ==
- Languages of Indonesia
- Languages of Taiwan
- Austronesian Formal Linguistics Association
- List of Austronesian languages
- List of Austronesian regions

== Bibliography ==
- Bellwood, Peter (July 1991). "The Austronesian Dispersal and the Origin of Languages". Scientific American. 265 (1): 88–93. Bibcode:1991SciAm.265a..88B. doi:10.1038/scientificamerican0791-88.
- Bellwood, Peter (1997). Prehistory of the Indo-Malaysian archipelago. Honolulu: University of Hawai'i Press.
- Bellwood, Peter (1998). "Taiwan and the Prehistory of the Austronesians-speaking Peoples". Review of Archaeology. 18: 39–48.
- Bellwood, Peter; Fox, James; Tryon, Darrell (1995). The Austronesians: Historical and comparative perspectives. Department of Anthropology, Australian National University. ISBN 978-0-7315-2132-6.
- Bellwood, Peter; Sanchez-Mazas, Alicia (June 2005). "Human Migrations in Continental East Asia and Taiwan: Genetic, Linguistic, and Archaeological Evidence". Current Anthropology. 46 (3): 480–484. doi:10.1086/430018. S2CID 145495386.
- Blench, Roger (June 10–13, 2004). Stratification in the peopling of China: how far does the linguistic evidence match genetics and archaeology? (PDF). Human migrations in continental East Asia and Taiwan: genetic, linguistic and archaeological evidence. Geneva.
- Blevins, Juliette (2007). "A Long Lost Sister of Proto-Austronesian? Proto-Ongan, Mother of Jarawa and Onge of the Andaman Islands" (PDF). Oceanic Linguistics. 46 (1): 154–198. doi:10.1353/ol.2007.0015. S2CID 143141296. Archived from the original (PDF) on 2011-01-11.
- Blust, Robert (1977). "The Proto-Austronesian pronouns and Austronesian subgrouping: a preliminary report". Working Papers in Linguistics. 9 (2). Honolulu: Department of Linguistics, University of Hawaii: 1–15.
- Blust, Robert (1985). "The Austronesian Homeland: A Linguistic Perspective". Asian Perspectives. 26: 46–67.
- Blust, Robert (1999). "Subgrouping, circularity and extinction: some issues in Austronesian comparative linguistics". In Zeitoun, E.; Li, P.J.K (eds.). Selected papers from the Eighth International Conference on Austronesian Linguistics. Taipei: Academia Sinica. pp. 31–94.
- Blust, Robert (2013). The Austronesian Languages (revised ed.). Australian National University. hdl:1885/10191. ISBN 978-1-922185-07-5.
- Blust, Robert (2014). "Some Recent Proposals Concerning the Classification of the Austronesian Languages". Oceanic Linguistics. 53 (2): 300–391. doi:10.1353/ol.2014.0025. S2CID 144931249.
- Comrie, Bernard (2001). "Languages of the world". In Aronoff, Mark; Rees-Miller, Janie (eds.). The Handbook of Linguistics. Languages of the world. Oxford: Blackwell. pp. 19–42. ISBN 1-4051-0252-7.
- Crowley, Terry (2009). "Austronesian languages". In Brown, Keith; Ogilvie, Sarah (eds.). Concise Encyclopaedia of Languages of the World. Oxford: Elsevier. pp. 96–105.
- Dahl, Otto Christian (1973). Proto-Austronesian. Lund: Skandinavian Institute of Asian Studies.
- Diamond, Jared M (2000). "Taiwan's gift to the world". Nature. 403 (6771): 709–10. Bibcode:2000Natur.403..709D. doi:10.1038/35001685. PMID 10693781.
- Dyen, Isidore (1965). "A Lexicostatistical classification of the Austronesian languages". International Journal of American Linguistics (Memoir 19).
- Fox, James J. (19–20 August 2004). Current Developments in Comparative Austronesian Studies (PDF). Symposium Austronesia Pascasarjana Linguististik dan Kajian Budaya. Universitas Udayana, Bali. Archived from the original (PDF) on 12 October 2006.
- Fuller, Peter (2002). "Reading the Full Picture". Asia Pacific Research. Canberra, Australia: Research School of Pacific and Asian Studies. Archived from the original on September 27, 2011.
- Grace, George W. (1966). "Austronesian Lexicostatistical Classification:a review article (Review of Dyen 1965)". Oceanic Linguistics. 5 (1): 13–58. doi:10.2307/3622788. JSTOR 3622788.
- Greenhill, S.J.; Blust, R.; Gray, R.D. (2008). "The Austronesian Basic Vocabulary Database: From Bioinformatics to Lexomics". Evolutionary Bioinformatics. 4 EBO.S893. SAGE Publications: 271–283. doi:10.4137/EBO.S893. PMC 2614200. PMID 19204825.
- Greenhill, S.J.; Blust, R.; Gray, R.D. (2003–2019). "Austronesian Basic Vocabulary Database". Archived from the original on 2018-12-19.
- Haudricourt, André G. (1965). "Problems of Austronesian comparative philology". Lingua. 14: 315–329. doi:10.1016/0024-3841(65)90048-3.
- Ko, Albert Min-Shan; et al. (2014). "Early Austronesians: Into and Out Of Taiwan". The American Journal of Human Genetics. 94 (3): 426–36. doi:10.1016/j.ajhg.2014.02.003. PMC 3951936. PMID 24607387.
- Li, Paul Jen-kuei (2004). "Origins of the East Formosans:Basay, Kavalan, Amis, and Siraya" (PDF). Language and Linguistics. 5 (2): 363–376. Archived from the original (PDF) on 2019-04-18.
- Li, Paul Jen-kuei (2006). The Internal Relationships of Formosan Languages. Tenth International Conference on Austronesian Linguistics (ICAL). Puerto Princesa City, Palawan, Philippines.
- Li, Paul Jen-kuei (2008). "Time perspective of Formosan Aborigines". In Sanchez-Mazas, Alicia; Blench, Roger; Ross, Malcolm D.; Peiros, Ilia; Lin, Marie (eds.). Past human migrations in East Asia: matching archaeology, linguistics and genetics. London: Routledge. pp. 211–218.
- McColl, Hugh; Racimo, Fernando; Vinner, Lasse; Demeter, Fabrice; Gakuhari, Takashi; et al. (2018-07-05). "The prehistoric peopling of Southeast Asia". Science. 361 (6397). American Association for the Advancement of Science (AAAS): 88–92. Bibcode:2018Sci...361...88M. bioRxiv 10.1101/278374. doi:10.1126/science.aat3628. hdl:10072/383365. ISSN 0036-8075. PMID 29976827. S2CID 206667111.
- Lynch, John; Ross, Malcolm; Crowley, Terry (2002). The Oceanic languages. Richmond, Surrey: Curzon Press. ISBN 0-415-68155-3.
- Melton, T.; Clifford, S.; Martinson, J.; Batzer, M.; Stoneking, M. (1998). "Genetic evidence for the proto-Austronesian homeland in Asia: mtDNA and nuclear DNA variation in Taiwanese aboriginal tribes". American Journal of Human Genetics. 63 (6): 1807–23. doi:10.1086/302131. PMC 1377653. PMID 9837834.
- Ostapirat, Weera (2005). "Kra–Dai and Austronesian: Notes on phonological correspondences and vocabulary distribution". In Laurent, Sagart; Blench, Roger; Sanchez-Mazas, Alicia (eds.). The Peopling of East Asia: Putting Together Archaeology, Linguistics and Genetics. London: Routledge Curzon. pp. 107–131.
- Peiros, Ilia (2004). Austronesian: What linguists know and what they believe they know. The workshop on Human migrations in continental East Asia and Taiwan. Geneva.
- Pereltsvaig, Asya (2018). Languages of the World. Cambridge University Press. ISBN 978-1-316-62196-7.
- Ross, Malcolm (2009). "Proto Austronesian verbal morphology: a reappraisal". In Adelaar, K. Alexander; Pawley, Andrew (eds.). Austronesian Historical Linguistics and Culture History: A Festschrift for Robert Blust. Canberra: Pacific Linguistics. pp. 295–326.
- Ross, Malcolm; Pawley, Andrew (1993). "Austronesian historical linguistics and culture history". Annual Review of Anthropology. 22: 425–459. doi:10.1146/annurev.an.22.100193.002233. OCLC 1783647.
- Ross, John (2002). "Final words: research themes in the history and typology of western Austronesian languages". In Wouk, Fay; Malcolm, Ross (eds.). The history and typology of Western Austronesian voice systems. Canberra: Pacific Linguistics. pp. 451–474.
- Sagart, Laurent; Hsu, Tze-Fu; Tsai, Yuan-Ching; Hsing, Yue-Ie C. (2017). "Austronesian and Chinese words for the millets". Language Dynamics and Change. 7 (2): 187–209. doi:10.1163/22105832-00702002. S2CID 165587524.
- Sagart, Laurent (8–11 January 2002). Sino-Tibeto-Austronesian: An updated and improved argument (PDF). Ninth International Conference on Austronesian Linguistics (ICAL9). Canberra, Australia.
- Sagart, Laurent (2004). "The higher phylogeny of Austronesian and the position of Tai–Kadai". Oceanic Linguistics. 43 (2): 411–440. doi:10.1353/ol.2005.0012. S2CID 49547647.
- Sagart, Laurent (2005). "Sino-Tibeto-Austronesian: An updated and improved argument". In Blench, Roger; Sanchez-Mazas, Alicia (eds.). The Peopling of East Asia: Putting Together Archaeology, Linguistics and Genetics. London: Routledge Curzon. pp. 161–176. ISBN 978-0-415-32242-3.
- Sapir, Edward (1968) [1949]. "Time perspective in aboriginal American culture: a study in method". In Mandelbaum, D.G. (ed.). Selected writings of Edward Sapir in language, culture and personality. Berkeley: University of California Press. pp. 389–467. ISBN 0-520-01115-5.
- Taylor, G. (1888). "A ramble through southern Formosa". The China Review. 16: 137–161. Archived from the original on 2021-04-11.
- Thurgood, Graham (1999). From Ancient Cham to Modern Dialects. Two Thousand Years of Language Contact and Change. Oceanic Linguistics Special Publications No. 28. Honolulu: University of Hawaii Press. ISBN 0-8248-2131-9.
- Trejaut, J. A.; Kivisild, T.; Loo, J. H.; Lee, C. L.; He, C. L. (2005). "Traces of archaic mitochondrial lineages persist in Austronesian-speaking Formosan populations". PLOS Biol. 3 (8): e247. doi:10.1371/journal.pbio.0030247. PMC 1166350. PMID 15984912.
- Wei, Lan-Hai; Yan, Shi; Teo, Yik-Ying; Huang, Yun-Zhi; et al. (2017). "Phylogeography of Y-chromosome haplogroup O3a2b2-N6 reveals patrilineal traces of Austronesian populations on the eastern coastal regions of Asia". PLOS ONE. 12 (4): 1–12. Bibcode:2017PLoSO..1275080W. doi:10.1371/journal.pone.0175080. PMC 5381892. PMID 28380021.
- Winter, Bodo (2010). "A Note on the Higher Phylogeny of Austronesian". Oceanic Linguistics. 49 (1): 282–287. doi:10.1353/ol.0.0067. JSTOR 40783595. S2CID 143458895.
- Wouk, Fay; Ross, Malcolm, eds. (2002). The history and typology of western Austronesian voice systems. Pacific Linguistics. Canberra: Australian National University.
