= Atayalic languages =

Austronesian language group of Taiwan

Atayalic
- Geographic distribution: Northern Taiwan
- Linguistic classification: Austronesian: Atayalic
- Proto-language: Proto-Atayalic
- Subdivisions: Atayal; Seediq

Language codes
- Glottolog: atay1246
- Linguasphere: 30-AA

The Atayalic languages are a group of Formosan languages spoken in northern Taiwan. Robert Blust considers them to form a primary branch within the Austronesian language family, However, Paul Jen-kuei Li groups them into the Northern Formosan branch, which includes the Northwestern Formosan languages.

== Classification ==
A map showing the distribution of the two major dialect groups of the Atayal language. The Atayal people reside in central and northern Taiwan, along the Hsuehshan mountains.

Li (1981) and Li (1982) classify the Atayalic languages and dialects as follows:

- Atayalic
  - Atayal
    - Squliq Atayal
      - Squliq
      - Maspaziʔ
      - Pyanan
      - Lmuan
      - Habun Bazinuq
      - Syanuh
      - Kulu
      - ŋŋupa
      - Haga-Paris
      - Kubaboo
      - Rghayuŋ
    - Cʼuliʼ Atayal (Tsʼoleʼ Atayal)
      - Skikun, Mnibuʔ
      - Mnawyan
      - Mayrinax (includes female and male registers)
      - Mabatuʔan
      - Matabalay
      - Sakuxan
      - Palŋawan
      - Mkgugut
      - Pyahaw
      - Ryuhiŋ
      - Mtlaŋan
      - Knŋyan
  - Seediq
    - Toŋan
    - Toda
    - Truwan
    - Inago

== Reconstruction ==
Proto-Atayalic
- Reconstruction of: Atayalic languages
- Reconstructed ancestor: Proto-Austronesian

The Proto-Atayalic language was reconstructed by Taiwanese linguist Paul Jen-kuei Li in 1981. Proto-Atayalic had final voiced stops, which are preserved in the Mayrinax dialect of Cʔuliʔ Atayal. These voiced stops include *-b, *-d, *-g, and *-g'. However, they are now lost in many dialects of Atayal, Seediq, and also Pazeh (Blust 2009:615).

== Bibliography ==
- Li, Paul Jen-Kuei (2004). "Reconstruction of Proto-Atayalic Phonology". Selected Papers on Formosan Languages (in English and Chinese). Taipei: Institute of Linguistics, Academia Sinica. ISBN 9789570184136.
