= Luilang language =

Extinct Austronesian language of Taiwan

Luilang
- Ketagalan
- Native to: Taiwan
- Region: Banqiao area, New Taipei City
- Ethnicity: Ketagalan
- Extinct: mid-20th century
- Language family: Austronesian: (unclassified); Luilang

Language codes
- ISO 639-3: kae
- Glottolog: keta1243
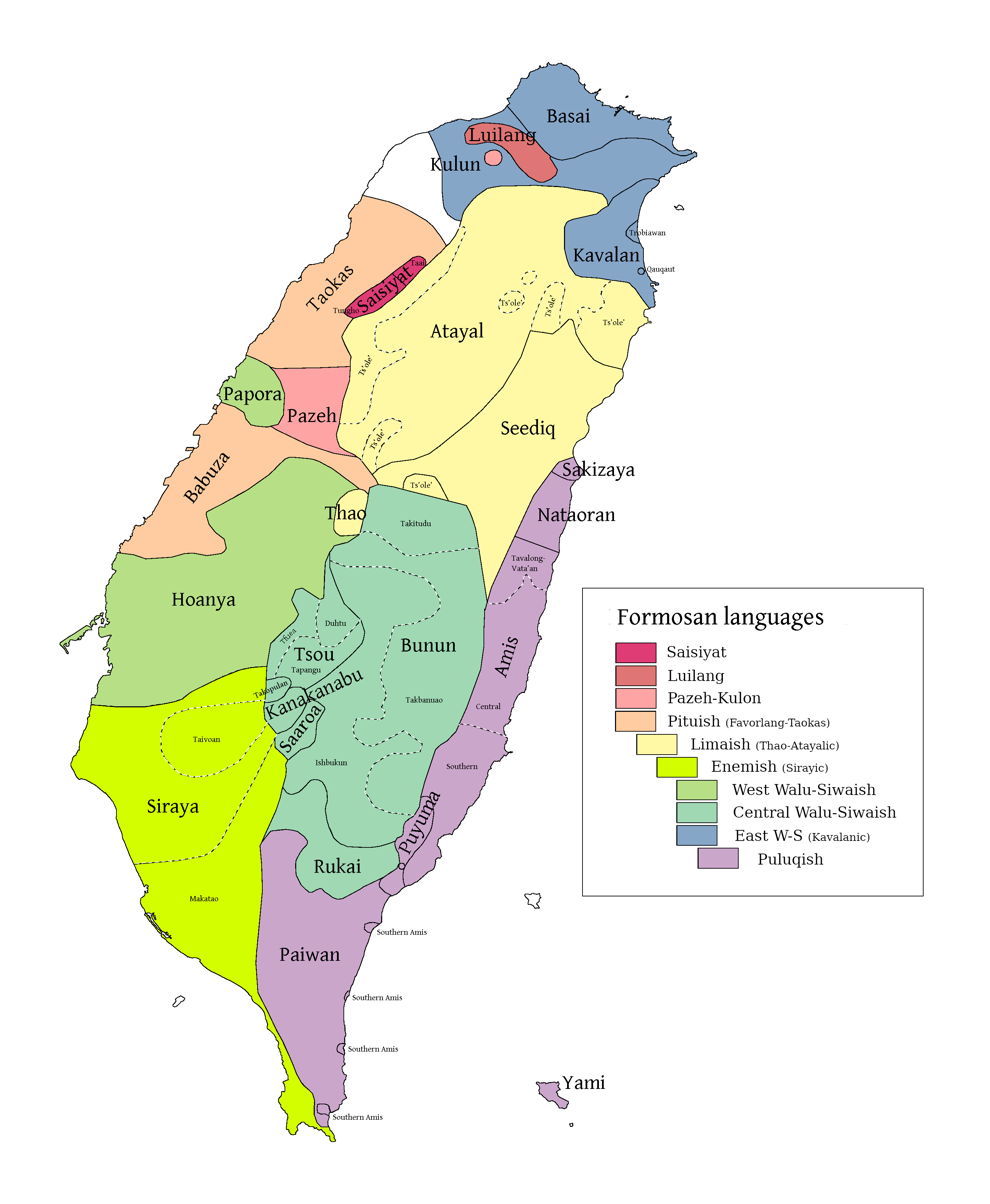
- Luilang is the northernmost of the four red areas in the map.

Luilang, or ambiguously Ketagalan (Ketangalan, Tangalan; Chinese: 凱達格蘭語; pinyin: Kǎidágélányǔ), was a Formosan language spoken south of modern-day Taipei in northern Taiwan by one of several peoples that have been called Ketagalan. The language probably went extinct in the mid-20th century and it is little researched.

== Location ==
According to oral tradition, the Luilang people originally inhabited four villages near Taipei: Luili (雷里, Leili), Siulang (秀朗, Xiulang), Bulisiat (務裡薛, Wulixue) and Liau-a (了阿, Liao'a). These merged under the combined name Luilang (雷朗, Leilang), and later migrated to their current location in Outer Oat-a (外挖仔庄, Waiwazizhuang) in the 18th century.

== Name ==
The name 'Ketagalan' is used by Ethnologue and Glottolog for the Luilang language. However, that name is ambiguous, originally referring to all of plains tribes of northern Taiwan. There has been argument in the literature as to whether it is better applied to Luilang, to the south and west of Taipei, or to Basay, to the east. 'Luilang' is an ancestral village name, and so unambiguous for the language southwest of Taipei, whereas 'Basay' is the endonym of the language to the east, and also unambiguous.

== Numerals ==
The numerals of Luilang are rather divergent. For instance, the Basay language has numerals 5–10 that are cognate with Proto-Malayo-Polynesian, which Luilang does not. Forms recorded by Guérin (using French transcription), Ino (using Japanese transcription) and Ogawa are:

Luilang numerals
source	1	2	3	4	5	6	7	8	9	10
Xiulang? (Guérin 1868)	saka	tsusa	toulou	souvad	laleup	tsouloup	patsouo-ana	patouloun	sateuna	isit
Xiulang (Ino 1896)	saka	tsusa	tooru	sma	naru	tsuro	yinai	tonai	satoronai	
Xiulang (Ino 1897)	saka	tsusa	tooru	seva	rārup	tserup	senai	patoorunai	satoorunai	irip
Luilang (Ogawa 1944)	sa(ka)	tsusa	tuḷu	suva	(na)lup	(na)tsulup	innai	patulunai	satulunai	isit
Ketangalan	tsa	Lusa	tsʰu:	špat	tsima	anum	pitu	watsu	siwa	Labatan
