= Huang Shujing =

Chinese diplomat (1682–1758)

Huáng Shújǐng (黃叔璥, 1682-1758) was the first Imperial High Commissioner to Taiwan (1722). A Beijinger, he was sent by the Kangxi Emperor of the Qing Empire, during whose reign Taiwan was annexed in 1684. He recorded his findings in Táihǎi shǐ chá lù (臺海使槎錄 "Records from the mission to Taiwan and its Strait").

== Works ==
- 黄叔璥 (1879). 臺海使槎錄: 8卷. 880-04Ji fu cong shu; 358-359 (in Chinese). Vol. 358–366. OCLC 902844735.
