= Babuza people =

Babuza
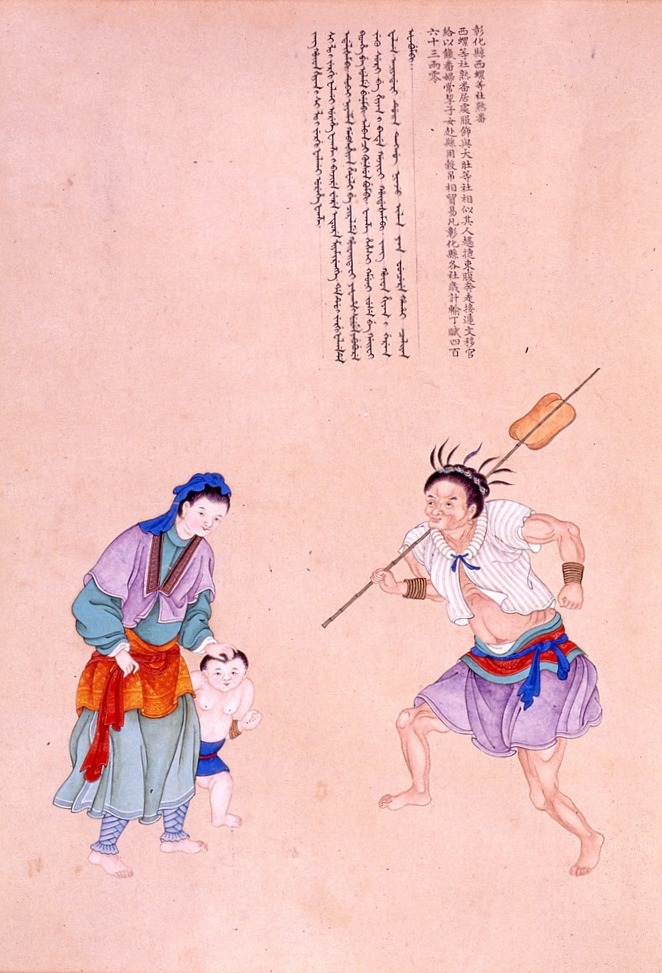

Total population
- Unknown

Regions with significant populations
- Taiwan

Languages
- Babuza language, Mandarin, Taiwanese

Religion
- Buddhism, Animism

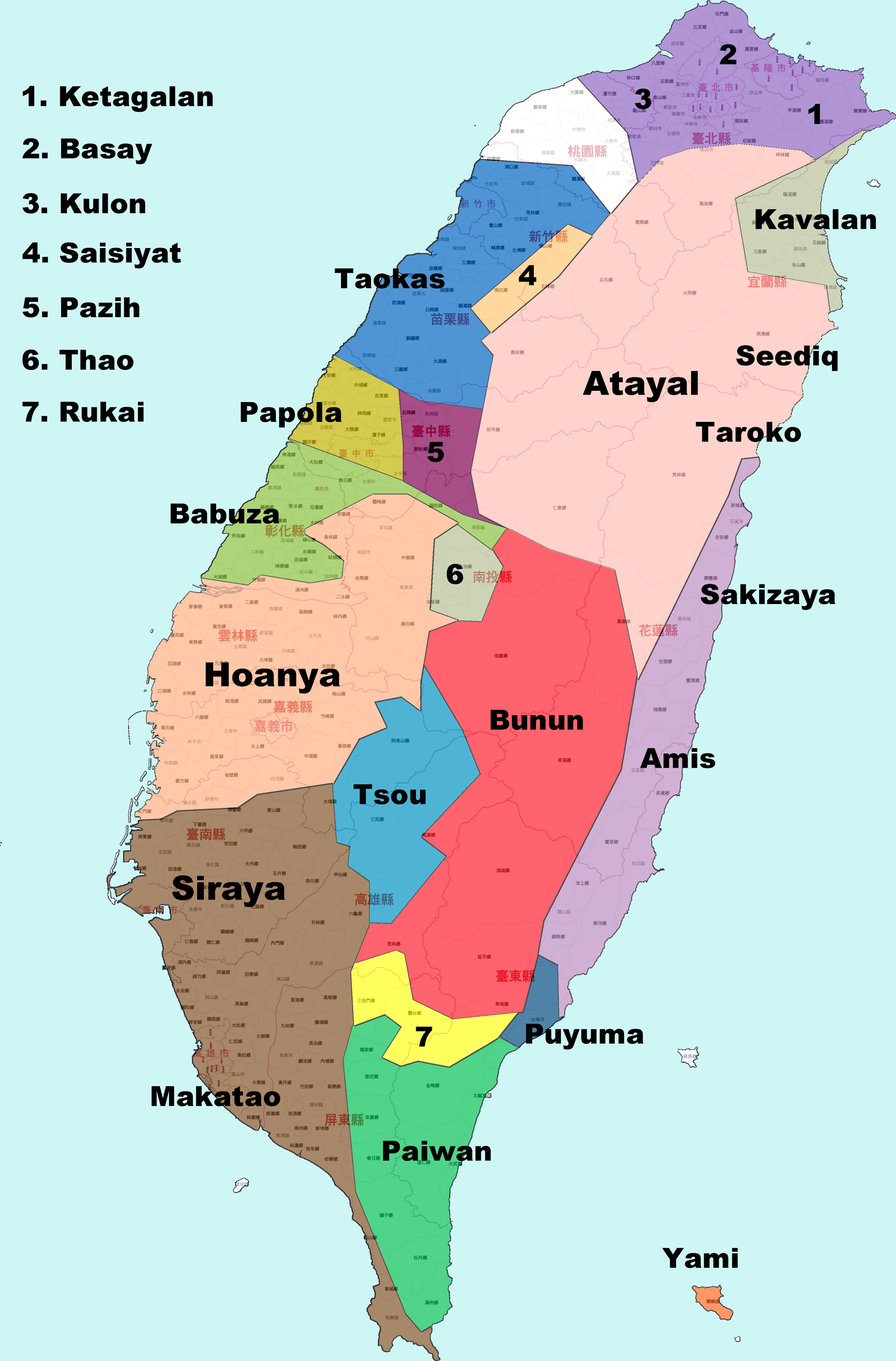
Babuza people live in middle Taiwan coast area.

The Babuza (Chinese: 巴布薩族; pinyin: Bābùsàzú, formerly incorrectly called 貓霧捒族; pinyin: Māowùshùzú) are a Taiwanese aboriginal people, living primarily in Changhua County and around the western part of Taiwan's Central Basin. The Babuza are included within the Plains indigenous people (or Pingpu people) group, but are not officially independently recognized by Taiwan despite calls for recognition.

== See also ==
- Babuza language
- Kingdom of Middag
- Taiwanese indigenous peoples
