= Li Jen-kuei =

Taiwanese linguist

Paul Li
- 李壬癸
- Born: 20 September 1936 (age 89)
- Occupation: Researcher

Paul Li, or Li Jen-kuei (Chinese: 李壬癸; pinyin: Lǐ Rénguǐ; born 20 September 1936), is a Taiwanese linguist. Li is a research fellow at the Institute of Linguistics, Academia Sinica in Taipei, Taiwan. Li is a leading specialist on Formosan languages and has published dictionaries on the Pazeh and Kavalan languages.

Li was elected a member of Academia Sinica in 2006.
