= Papora-Hoanya language =

Extinct Formosan language of Taiwan

Papora–Hoanya
- Bupuran, Hinapavosa, Papola, Papora-Hoanya, Hoanya, Vupuran
- Native to: Taiwan
- Ethnicity: Papora, Hoanya
- Extinct: by 2009
- Language family: Austronesian: Western Plains Formosan; Central; Papora–Hoanya
- Dialects: Papora; Hoanya

Language codes
- ISO 639-3: ppu
- Glottolog: papo1239
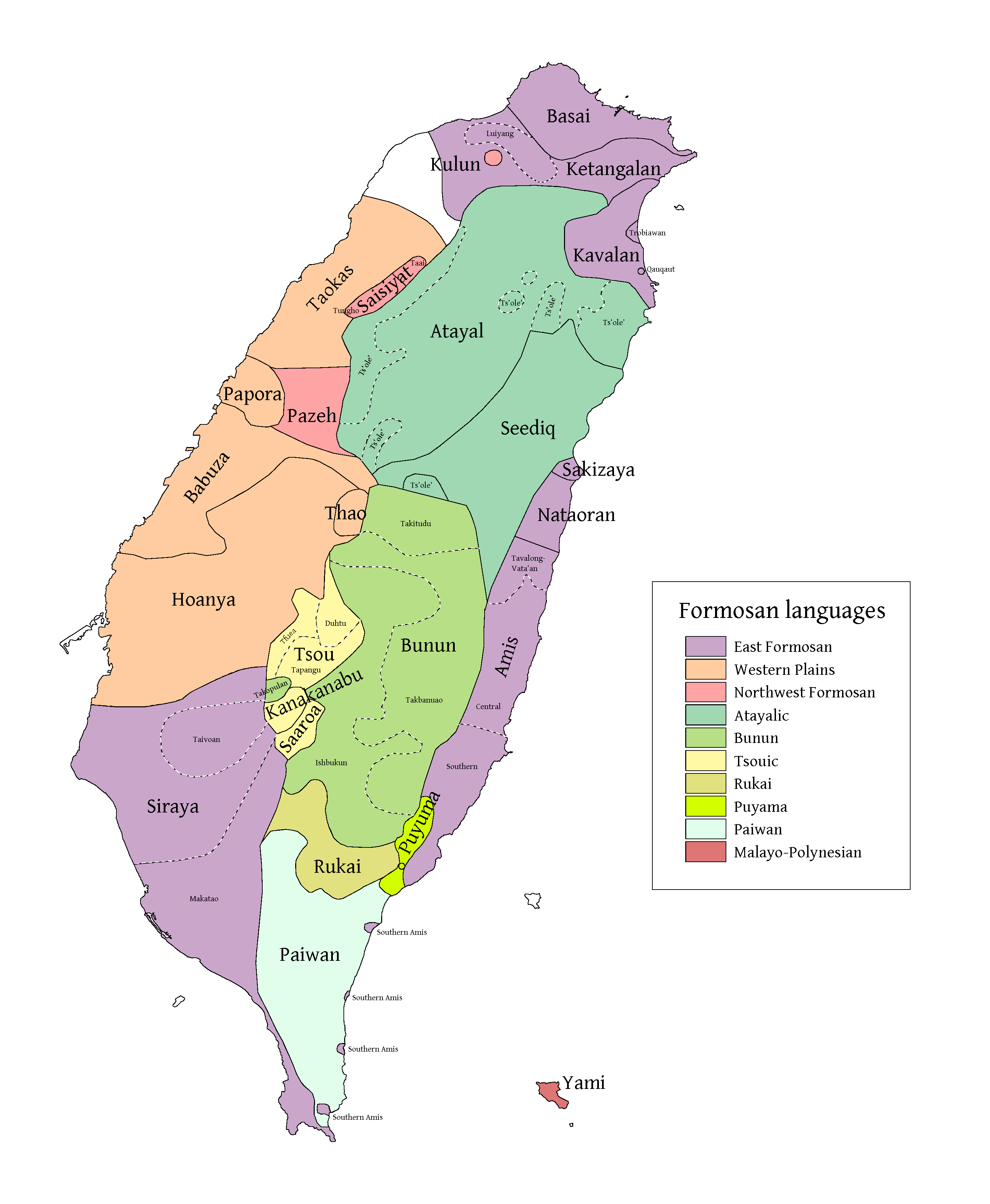
- (orange) The Papora-Hoanya, Babuza, and Thao languages

Papora–Hoanya, also known as Bupuran, Hinapavosa, Papola, Papora–Hoanya, Hoanya and Vupuran, is an extinct Formosan language of Taiwan. It was made up of the Papora and Hoanya dialects which were spoken across the middle western side of the island, ranging from Dajia to Dadu, and inland to Taichung. The earliest found report of its extinction was from 2009.

== Phonology ==
Papora–Hoanya contained the consonant phonemes p, t, k, θ, s, b, d, l, m, and n and others though it lacked the consonants q and h.

== Vocabulary ==
Hoanya	English
abiki	areca nut
ada~ala	child
atu	dog
babu	pig
batu	stone
bulas	moon
bulbul	banana
dumoák	to stand
dzalan	road
dzapu	fire
k<am>ita	to see
lasən	vegetables
lima	five
lipun	tooth
ma-bali	windy
magi	come
ma-kat-a-lat-hah	to hunt
mama	father
mami	sweet
ma-pasa	to die
masa	eye
matala-gasut	one
matsahā	to steal
ma-tulu	sleep
mudzas	ro rain
numzak	to cook
padza	rice plant
pai	woman/female
pa-itik	few
saŋila	ear
sau	person
-sia	nine
sibus	sugarcane
sikan	fish
suazi	younger sister
s<um>ai	to defecate
tiat~chias	belly
t<um>māla	to hear
tutu	female breast
ulu	head
usu	louse
vaki	grandfather
zazum~salum	water
