= Paiwan =

Paiwan may refer to:

- the Paiwan people
- the Paiwan language
