= The four-sided ancestral pillar of Zingrur from Kaviyangan =

Wooden sculpture from Taiwan

The four-sided ancestral pillar of Zingrur from Kaviyangan, also known as the four-sided wooden carved ancestral pillar from the house of Chief Zingrur, Kaviyangan, Paiwan (Paiwan language: na Paiwan a Kemasi Kaviyangan na lja Zingerur a Pararulj), is a wooden carved side pillar containing the symbolic meaning of ancestral spirits originally in the old house of Chief Zingrur from the Paiwan Kaviyangan tribe. It is currently being displayed at NTU Museum of Anthropology, Taipei.

== History ==
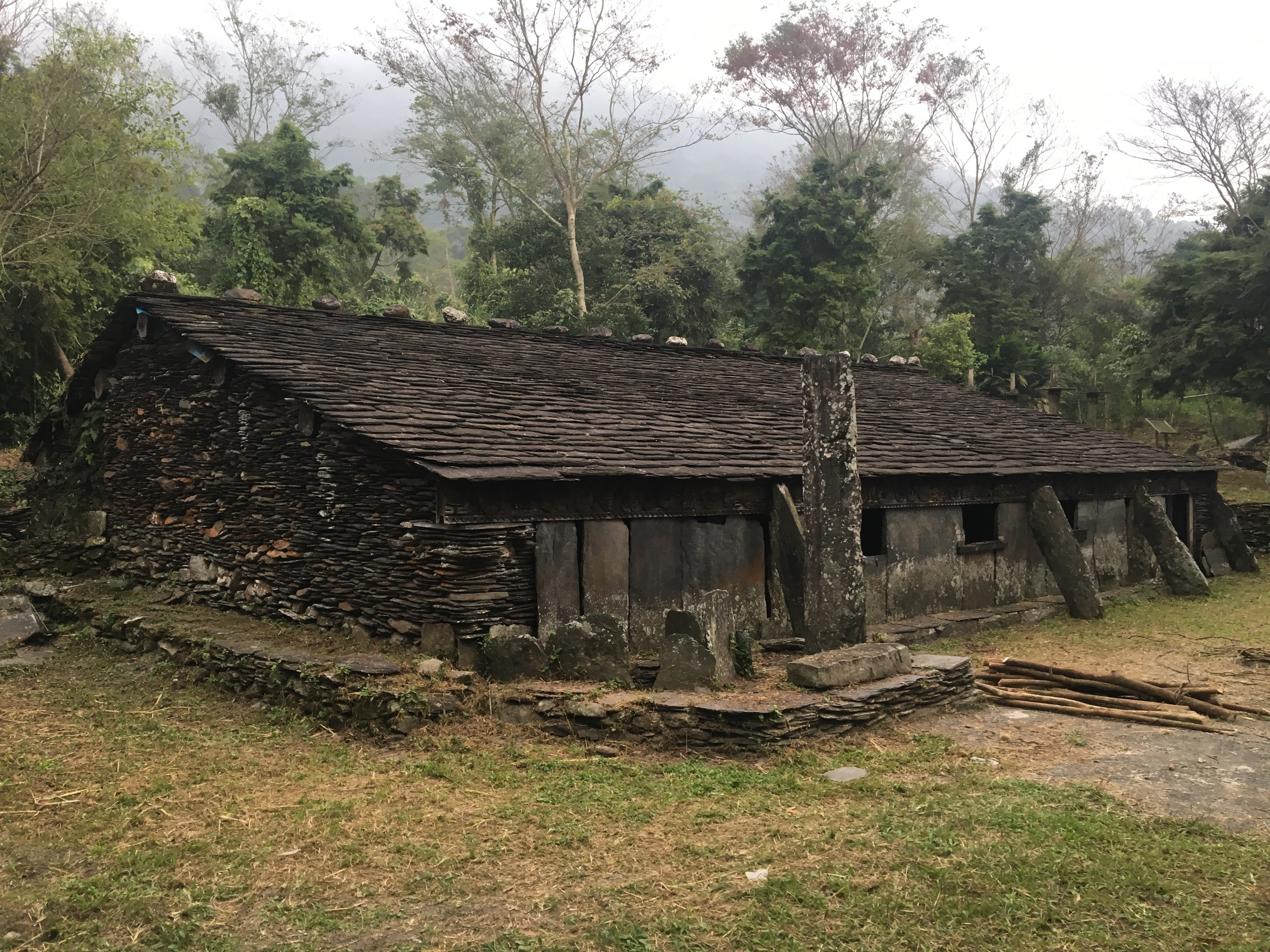
Old house of Chief Zingrur

The wooden carved pillar was originally a side pillar in the old house of Chief Zingrur from the Paiwan Kaviyangan tribe. The old house was located 20-minute drive from the current Kaviyangan village and close to the summit of Nandawushan, Pingtung County.

In 1932, a Japanese anthropologist discovered the house and the pillar, collected it and archived it into the collections by Taihoku Imperial University (the predecessor of the National Taiwan University). After the handover of Taiwan in 1945, the pilar became part of the National Taiwan University (NTU) Museum of Anthropology collection.

In March 2015, this pillar was designated as a national treasure by the Ministry of Culture. Originally, the people from the Kaviyangan tribe wanted their pillar back, but they agreed to a compromise where a symbolic wedding between the NTU and the pillar would be held. With a traditional Paiwan wedding, it would symbolise the tribe marrying away the pillar as a bride to the university. This allowed the nobility and cultural value of the pillar to be recognized, and an alliance to be formed between the tribe and the university.

On 12 September 2015, the wedding took place in the NTU Museum of Anthropology, with former NTU president Yang Pan-Chyr marrying the pillar as a representative from the university. Around 80 people from the Kaviyangan tribe attended the wedding, performing wedding songs and traditional dances.

== Composition ==
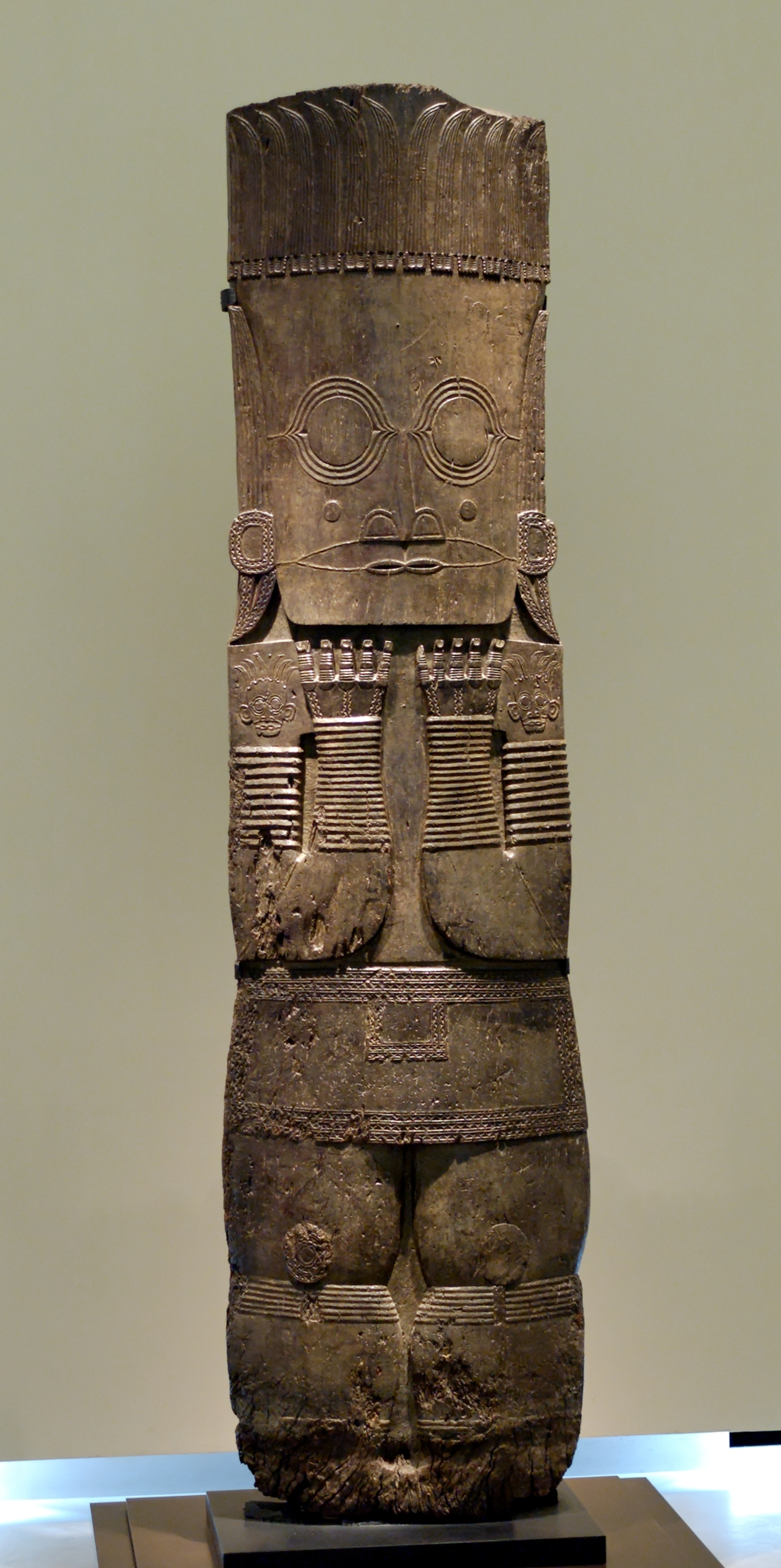
Mulitan ancestral pillar

The ancestral pillar has images of Muakai Zingrur, the female ancestor who founded the Kaviyangan tribe, carved into all four sides of the pillar. The tribe believes that they could invite the spirits of their ancestor into the pillar through a ceremony, and they would worships the pillars as if they were the ancestors.

The ancestral pillar is nearly 170 cm high, made of wood, and carved with four sides. The width of the four sides is 30 to 39 cm. Bas-relief and line carving techniques were used to present a full-body standing figure of a woman, with her hands held together and flat on her chest. The woman has six fingers. Her fingers, wrists, arms, and lower legs were sculpted with multiple circles of parallel carving patterns, which can be inferred to be of noble origin.

It is unknown when the pillar was craved, but since it was discovered in 1932, it is at least 93 years old.

This pillar also has a "daughter" pillar originally placed next to it in the old house of Chief Zingrur, and has images of Mulitan, daughter of Muakai, carved on it. This "daughter" pillar was also listed as a national treasure and is currently at Biodiversity Research Museum, Academia Sinica.
