= Chen Cheng-jia =

Taiwanese politician

- 陳成家

Administrative Deputy Minister of the Council of Indigenous Peoples of the Republic of China
- Incumbent
- Assumed office 22 October 2013
- Minister: Lin Chiang-yi

Personal details
- Born: 1960 (age 65–66)
- Education: City University of Seattle

Chen Cheng-jia (Chinese: 陳成家; pinyin: Chén Chéngjiā) is a Taiwanese politician. He currently serves as the Administrative Deputy Minister of the Council of Indigenous Peoples of the Executive Yuan. He is a Han Chinese.

== Education ==
Chen obtained his master's degree from the City University of Seattle in the United States.

== Career ==
Chen began his public service career as a junior civil servant. He supervised and promoted programs to benefit Taiwanese indigenous people. He was appointed Administrative Deputy Minister of the Council of Indigenous Peoples on 22 October 2013.
