= Hung Liang-chuan =

Politician from Taiwan

- 洪良全

Deputy Minister of Council of Indigenous Peoples of the Republic of China
- Incumbent
- Assumed office 20 May 2012
- Minister: Sun Ta-chuan
- Preceded by: Xia Jin-long

Personal details
- Education: National Taiwan University (BA)

Hung Liang-chuan or Uya Pawan (Chinese: 洪良全; pinyin: Hóng Liángquán) is a Taiwanese politician. He served as the Deputy Minister of the Council of Indigenous Peoples of the Executive Yuan starting in May 2012.

== Education ==
Hung obtained his bachelor's degree in economics from National Taiwan University in 1973.

== Early political life ==
Prior to his appointment as Deputy Minister of the Council of Indigenous Peoples, Hung was the director of the Department of Economic and Public Construction of the same council.

== See also ==
- Taiwanese aborigines
