= Ahronglong Sakinu =

Taiwanese writer

Ahronglong Sakinu Tai Chih-chiang
- Sakinu Yalonglong
- Born: 28 January 1972 (age 54); Taitung County, Taiwan
- Occupation: Writer

Ahronglong Sakinu (Chinese: 亞榮隆．撒可努; Pinayuanan: Sakinu Yalonglong; born 28 January 1972) is a Taiwanese indigenous Paiwan writer and forest hunter. His name means "The Last Hunter" in Lalaulan. His Chinese name is Dai Zhiqiang (Chinese: 戴志強). He was born to the Paiwan Lalaulan clan in Taitung, Taiwan, on 28 January 1972. His father was a laborer and often abusive toward Ahronglong Sakinu and his two brothers. The abuse forced his mother out of the house, and Ahronglong Sakinu often ran away. He was trained as a police officer, and found law enforcement work in Taipei. He later became a forest ranger.

He gained recognition from his book The Sage Hunter (山豬．飛鼠．撒可努), winning the 2000 Wu Yung-fu Literature Prize (巫永福文學獎). The book, written in 1998, was adapted into a film and released in 2005. His work has been translated into English and Japanese, and also made into cartoons. In November 2005, he founded a hunter school to educate and introduce youngsters to Paiwan culture and traditional Paiwan skills.

== List of works ==
- The Sage Hunter (山豬．飛鼠．撒可努)
- Wind Walker, My Dad the Hunter (走風的人, 我的獵人父親)
- Grandpa's Ocean (外公的海)
- Vu Vu's Tales (Vu Vu 的故事)
- Pali's Red Eyes (巴里的紅眼睛), a Paiwan legend
