= Ljaucu Zingrur =

Taiwanese politician (born 1962)

- 曾智勇
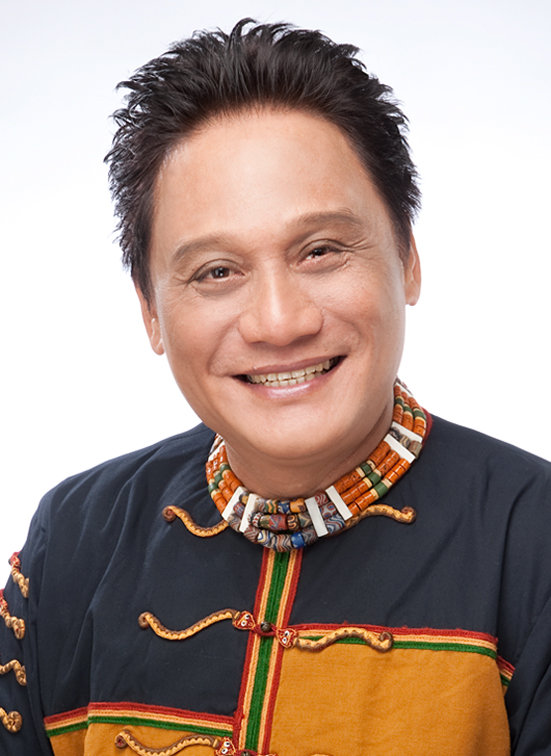
- Official portrait, 2024

10th Minister of Indigenous Affairs
- Incumbent
- Assumed office 20 May 2024
- Prime Minister: Cho Jung-tai
- Preceded by: Icyang Parod

Personal details
- Born: 28 February 1962 (age 64) Pingtung County, Taiwan
- Party: Democratic Progressive Party
- Education: National Taiwan University (LLB)

Ljaucu Zingrur (Paiwan pronunciation: [ʎaˈut͡su ˈʑiŋrur]; born 28 February 1962), is a Taiwanese politician.

== Early life and education ==
Zingrur is of Paiwan descent. Tseng attended National Taiwan University from 1982 to 1986, graduating with a bachelor's degree in law.

== Political career ==
Zingrur worked for the Mudan Township Office of the Pingtung County Government from 1991 to 1992, when he joined Pingtung's Department of Civil Affairs, where he remained until 1996. Zingrur subsequently served as secretary of the Maolin District Representative Council in Kaohsiung, then rejoined the Pingtung County Government in the same role in 2000. He became head of Pingtung's Department of Indigenous Peoples in 2004, and was a Democratic Progressive Party party-list candidate for the 2005 Taiwanese National Assembly election. Zingrur ran for a seat in the multi-member Highland Aborigine Constituency of the Legislative Yuan in the 2012 legislative election, and was not seated. He remained director of Pingtung's Department of Indigenous Peoples until 2016, when he joined the Council of Indigenous Peoples' Cultural Development Center. Zingrur additionally served on the Indigenous Historical Justice and Transitional Justice Committee convened by Office of the President. He was formally appointed minister of the Council of Indigenous People on 19 April 2024.
