= Calivat Gadu =

Taiwanese lawyer and ethnologist

Calivat Gadu Chung Hing-hwa
- 鍾興華

Administrative Deputy Minister Indigenous Affairs
- In office 2 September 2013 – 20 May 2024
- Minister: Mayaw Dongi; Icyang Parod

Personal details
- Education: National Taiwan University (LLB); National Chengchi University (MA, PhD)

Calivat Gadu (Paiwan pronunciation: [t͡saˈlivat ˈɡadu]; Chinese: 鍾興華; pinyin: Zhōng Xìnghuá) is a Taiwanese lawyer and ethnologist. He currently serves as the Administrative Deputy Minister of the Council of Indigenous Peoples (CIP) of the Executive Yuan. He is of the Paiwan people.

He obtained his bachelor's degree in law from National Taiwan University, and continued his master's and doctoral degrees in ethnology from National Chengchi University.

He had been the Director-General of the Department of Planning and Department of Education and Culture of the CIP.

== See also ==
- Taiwanese aborigines
