= Tibusungu 'e Vayayana =

Politician and geographer from Taiwan

- 汪明輝

Deputy Minister of Indigenous Affairs
- In office 20 May 2016 – 20 May 2024
- Minister: Icyang Parod

Personal details
- Education: National Taiwan Normal University (BS, MS, PhD)

Tibusungu 'e Vayayana (Chinese: 汪明輝; pinyin: Wāng Mínghuī) is a Taiwanese Tsou geographer and politician. He has served as the Deputy Minister of the Council of Indigenous Peoples (CIP) since 20 May 2016.

== Education ==
Vayayana obtained his bachelor's, master's and doctoral degrees in geography from National Taiwan Normal University (NTNU).

== Early career ==
Vayayana is an associate professor at the Department of Geography at NTNU. He heads the Indigenous Research and Development Center of the university and has helped CIP to conduct surveys on traditional tribal territories.
