= New Taipei City Constituency 4 =

Constituency of the Legislative Yuan of Taiwan

- Single-member constituency for the Legislative Yuan
- District(s): Sanchong (75 villages)
- Electorate: 301,391 (2024 election)

Current constituency
- Created: 2008 (as Taipei County Constituency 4); 2010 (current name)
- Party: DPP
- Member: Wu Ping-jui

New Taipei City Constituency 4 (Chinese: 新北市第四選舉區; pinyin: Xīnběi Shì Dìsì Xuǎnjǔ Qū) is one of the 73 regional constituencies represented in the Legislative Yuan, the national legislature of Taiwan. It was created in 2008 (as Taipei County Constituency 4) following a series of constitutional reforms, and elects one legislator, through first-past-the-post voting, to the Legislative Yuan. It has been represented by Wu Ping-jui of the Democratic Progressive Party since 2024.

== Legislators ==
Election	Legislator	Party
2008 - 2015	Lee Hung-chun	Kuomintang
2015 - 2016	Lee Hung-chun	People First Party
2016	Wu Ping-jui	Democratic Progressive Party

== Election results ==

=== 2008 (Note: Named Taipei County Constituency 4, boundaries unchanged.) ===
2008 Taiwanese legislative election: Taipei County 4
Candidate	Party	Votes	%
Lee Hung-chun	Kuomintang	77,122	51.73
Wu Ping-jui	Democratic Progressive Party	70,265	47.13
Cheng Yu-hao	Taiwan Solidarity Union	969	0.65
Hsu Wen-yen	Green Party Taiwan	721	0.48
Total		149,077	100.00
Valid votes		149,077	98.93
Invalid/blank votes		1,606	1.07
Total votes		150,683	100.00
Registered voters/turnout		253,939	59.34
Majority		6,857	4.6
Kuomintang win (new seat)			

=== 2012 ===
* denotes the incumbent legislator

2012 Taiwanese legislative election: New Taipei 4
Candidate	Party	Votes	%	±
Lee Hung-chun*	Kuomintang	103,165	51.08	▼0.65
Lin Cho-shui	Democratic Progressive Party	94,126	46.60	▼0.53
Cheng Yu-cheng	National Health Service Alliance	2,831	1.40	NEW
Lin Li-jung	Righteous Party	1,852	0.92	NEW
Total		201,974	100.00	–
Valid votes		201,974	98.49	
Invalid/blank votes		3,096	1.51	
Total votes		205,070	100.00	
Registered voters/turnout		267,836	76.57	
Majority		9,039	4.48	
Kuomintang hold				

=== 2016 ===
2016 Taiwanese legislative election: New Taipei 4
Candidate	Party	Votes	%	±
Wu Ping-jui	Democratic Progressive Party	116,723	62.99	▲16.39
Mars Chen	Kuomintang	54,487	29.40	▼21.68
Chia Po-kai	Green Party Taiwan - Social Democratic Party alliance	8,609	4.65	NEW
Wang Ssu-i	Taiwan Constitution Association	2,864	1.55	NEW
Chiu Hung-kan	Independent	1,265	0.68	NEW
Lin Li-jung	Righteous Party	847	0.46	▼0.46
Liu Feng-chang	Peace Dove Alliance Party	518	0.28	NEW
Total		185,313	100.00	–
Valid votes		185,313	97.46	
Invalid/blank votes		4,822	2.54	
Total votes		190,135	100.00	
Registered voters/turnout		282,373	67.33	
Majority		62,236	33.59	
Democratic Progressive Party gain from People First Party				

=== 2020 ===
* denotes the incumbent legislator

2020 Taiwanese legislative election: New Taipei 4
Candidate	Party	Votes	%	±
Wu Ping-jui*	Democratic Progressive Party	119,461	55.13	▼7.86
Chen Ming-yi	Kuomintang	80,455	37.13	▲7.73
Chang Che-wei	Green Party Taiwan	7,025	3.24	▼1.41
Wang Ssu-i	Congress Party Alliance	3,389	1.56	NEW
Chen Chun-hsien	Stabilising Force Party	2,729	1.26	NEW
Chu Yueh-han	Independent	1,469	0.68	NEW
Huang Po-jen	Labour Party	887	0.41	NEW
Yeh Hung-jen	Taiwan Action Party Alliance	637	0.29	NEW
Li Lin-jung	Justice Party	623	0.29	NEW
Total		216,675	100.00	–
Valid votes		216,675	97.63	
Invalid/blank votes		5,259	2.37	
Total votes		221,934	100.00	
Registered voters/turnout		293,428	75.63	
Majority		39,006	18	
Democratic Progressive Party hold				

=== 2024 ===
* denotes the incumbent legislator

2024 Taiwanese legislative election: New Taipei 4
Candidate	Party	Votes	%	±
Wu Ping-jui*	Democratic Progressive Party	107,772	50.21	▼4.92
Chiang Hsin-chang	Kuomintang	89,121	41.52	▲4.39
Hung I-fu	Independent	14,840	6.91	NEW
Su Hui-huang	Independent	1,924	0.90	NEW
Chiu Chi-chun	Institutional Island of Saving the World	1,002	0.47	NEW
Total		214,659	100.00	–
Valid votes		214,659	96.81	
Invalid/blank votes		7,069	3.19	
Total votes		221,728	100.00	
Registered voters/turnout		301,391	73.57	
Majority		18,651	8.69	
Democratic Progressive Party hold				
