= Chen Jinn-lih =

Taiwanese politician

- 陳進利
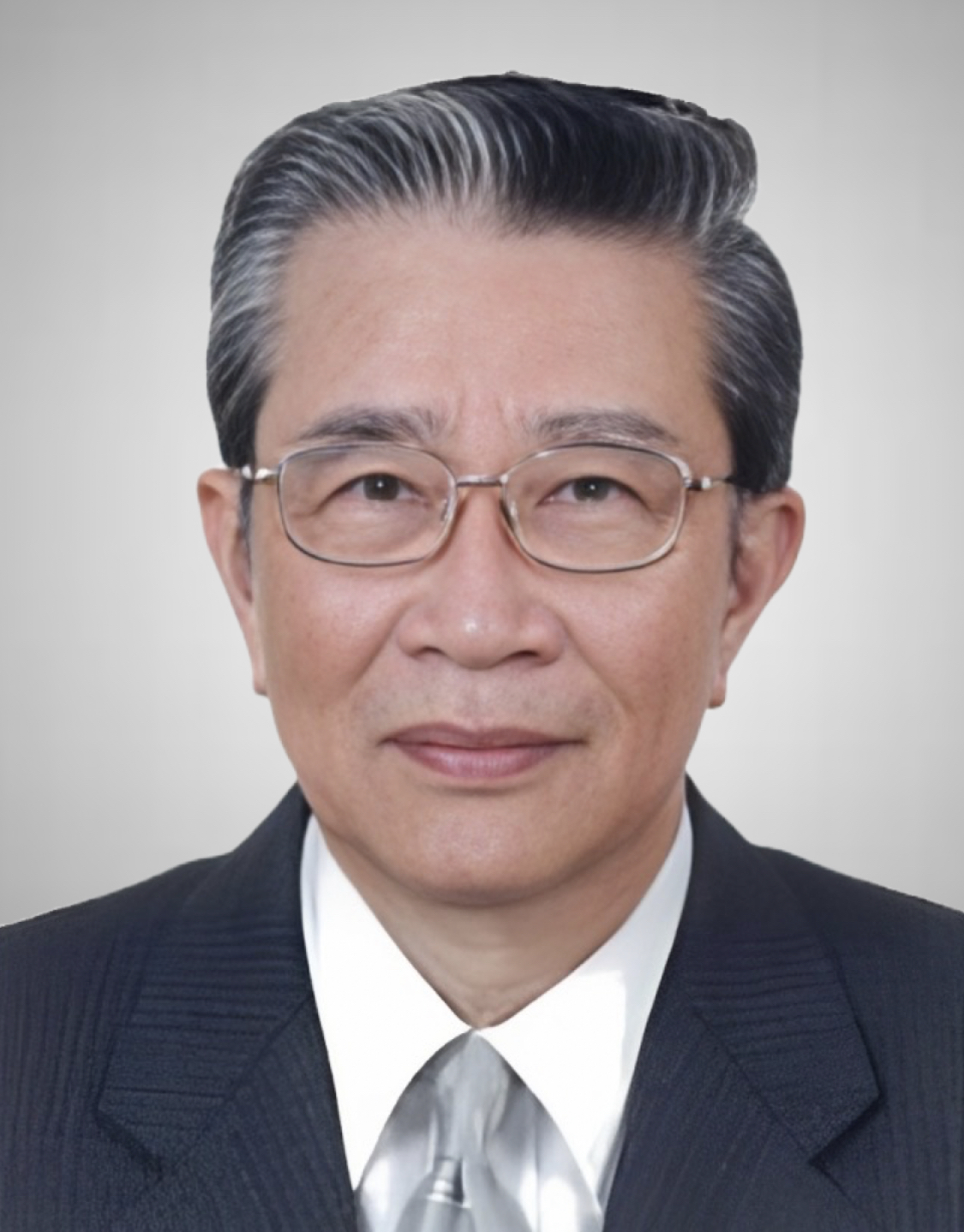

Vice President of Control Yuan
- In office 14 November 2008 – 1 August 2014
- President: Wang Chien-shien
- Succeeded by: Sun Ta-chuan

Personal details
- Party: Kuomintang
- Education: National Chengchi University (MA); Kyushu University (PhD)

Chen Jinn-lih (traditional Chinese: 陳進利; simplified Chinese: 陈进利; pinyin: Chén Jìnlì) is a Taiwanese Amis politician. He was the first person of indigenous descent to be appointed as Vice President of the Control Yuan.

== Education ==
Chen obtained his master's degree in finance from National Chengchi University and earned his Ph.D. in agriculture from Kyushu University in Japan.

== Control Yuan ==
During his first term on the Control Yuan, Chen worked on a case involving radioactive waste disposal, and led an investigation into the March 19 shooting incident, an assassination attempt on incumbent president Chen Shui-bian and vice president Annette Lu one day before the 2004 presidential election. As Chen Jinn-lih's tenure on the Control Yuan was about to end, Chen Shui-bian received criticism, as none of his Control Yuan nominees were of indigenous descent.

Chen Shui-bian's successor Ma Ying-jeou nominated Chen Jinn-lih to serve as vice president of the Control Yuan, after his original selection for the post, Shen Fu-hsiung, was rejected. The Legislative Yuan approved Chen Jinn-lih's appointment, and upon taking office, he became the first indigenous and Amis person to serve as the Control Yuan's vice presidency.

After Typhoon Morakot struck Taiwan in August 2009, Chen became the convener of the typhoon disaster investigations. From 2010 through at least 2012, Chen represented the Control Yuan on the inaugural Human Rights Consultative Committee, reporting to the Office of the President.

During the 2012 presidential election, Democratic Progressive Party lawmakers suggested that the Control Yuan impeach Chen, after Next Magazine reported that Chen had visited an association formed to support Ma Ying-jeou's reelection bid. Chen acknowledged that he had made the visit as a member of the Chinese Tempered Golf Association, but was not involved with the political support group.
