= Tsou people =

Indigenous people of Taiwan

Cou
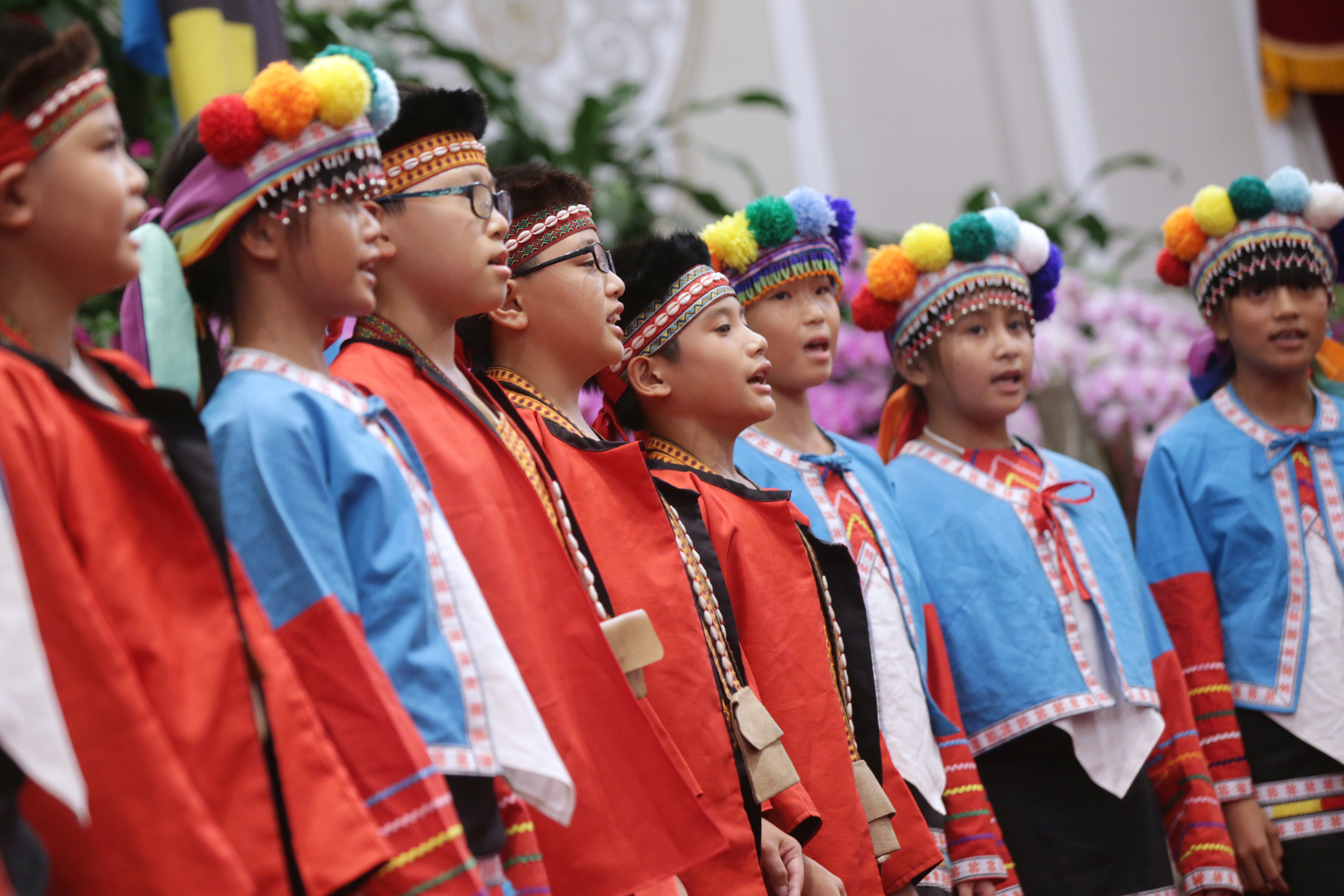

Total population
- 6,710 (January 2018)

Regions with significant populations
- Taiwan

Languages
- Tsou, Mandarin

Religion
- Animism, Christianity

Related ethnic groups
- Kanakanavu, Saaroa, Taiwanese indigenous peoples

The Tsou (Tsou: Cou; Chinese: 鄒; pinyin: Zōu; Wade–Giles: Tsou) are an indigenous people of central southern Taiwan. They are an Austronesian ethnic group. They reside in Chiayi County and Nantou County.

The Tsou numbered around 6,000, approximately 1.19% of Taiwan's total Indigenous population, making them the seventh-largest indigenous group. They are sometimes confused with the Thao people of Sun Moon Lake.

== History ==
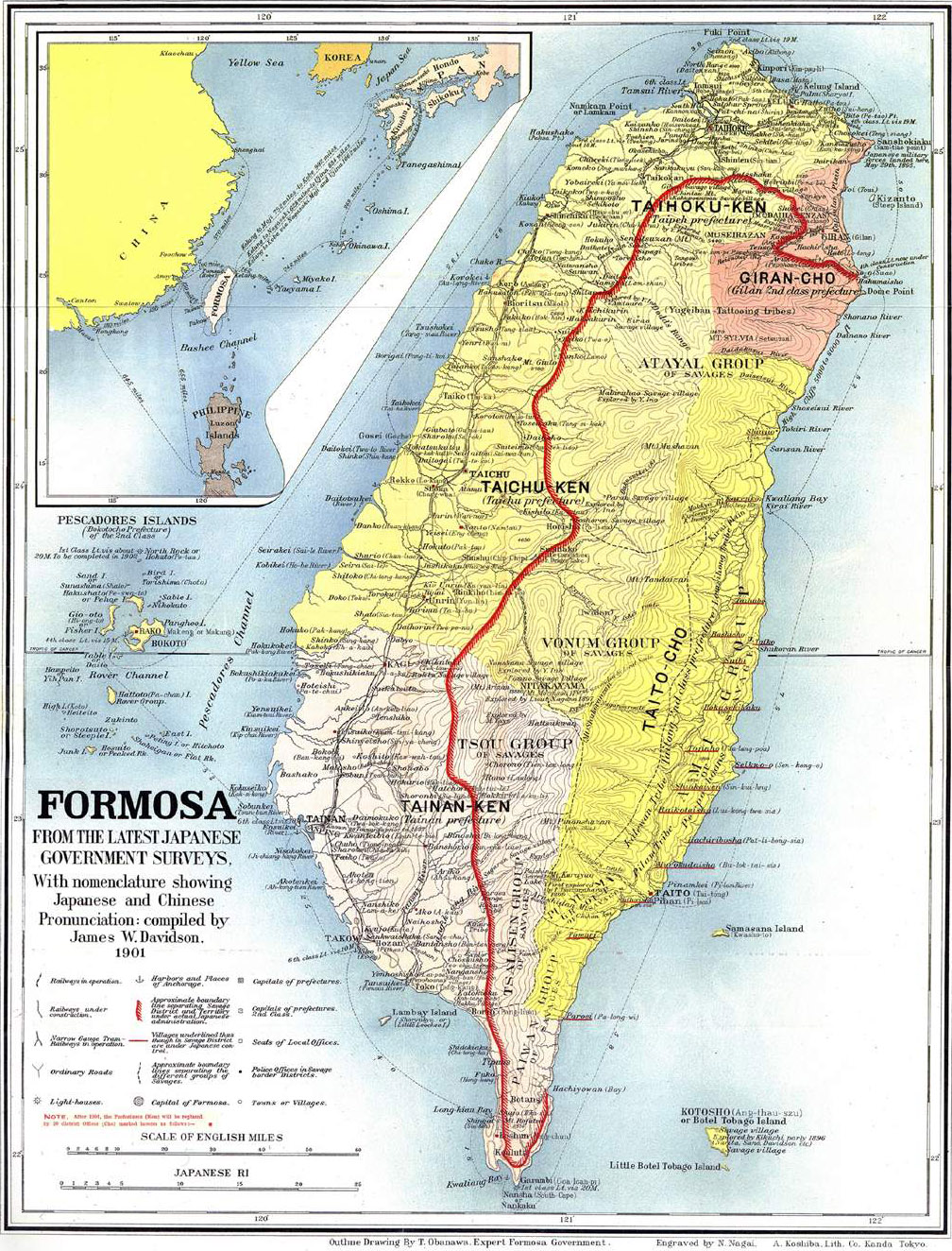
Taiwan in 1901, with the Tsou marked as "Tsou Group".

The Tsou are traditionally based in the Alishan area. Their rich oral histories describe migrations of each ancient clans' ancestors into the area between Yushan and the Chianan Plain. Originally, each clan had its own settlement, with the first multi-clan town, Tfuya, forming approximately 1600 CE.

The earliest written record of the Tsou dates from the Dutch colonial period, which describes the multi-clan settlement Tfuya as having approximately 300 people in 1647. Ethnologists have attempted to reconstruct the development of Tfuya, proposing that each stage of clan migration could be equivalent to three or four generations of family. Another Formosan group of Bunun origin called the Takopulan reportedly lived in the same area, but were absorbed by the Tsou. Their largest settlement had 450 people in 1647. During the Japanese colonial period, four Tsou groups were recorded: Tfuya, Tapangᵾ, Imucu and Luhtu.

== Clothes ==
The traditional attire of the Tsou people is made of leather for men and cotton, silk, or brocade for women. The feathers on the leather hat symbolize the bravery of men.

Common colors include red, white, black, and blue, with red being particularly common for men. Red is a crucial color in the traditional attire of the Tsou tribe, symbolizing courage, strength, and vitality. It is often prominent in the clothing of men and may serve as a symbol for warriors or leaders. Blue signifies the sky and sea, representing peace and harmony. It may also symbolize a connection and empathy with nature.

Gentleman's attire includes fur hats, chest covers, long-sleeved jackets, fur vests, fur leg covers, and fur shoes. The hat holds significant meaning, as wearing a fur hat symbolizes an adult who is prepared to take on responsibilities for the tribe and family. When dressing up, men adorn their hats with feathers from eagles, Taiwan blue pheasants, Mikado pheasants, or condors to symbolize their courage. Women's attire comprises a black scarf, chest cover, long-sleeved jacket, dress, and leggings.

The Tsou dress code is associated with age and social status. Leaders and warriors in the tribe may adorn themselves with special decorations. Warriors, chiefs and marshals can add a red decorative band with pearls, jade, and seashells to the front of their hats. The red color symbolizes courage and strength in Tsou culture, emphasizing the dignity of leaders and warriors. In addition to copper bracelets and arm ornaments, those who have hunted wild boars can wear bracelets with wild boar tusks.

== Notable Tsous ==
- Francesca Kao, actress, singer and television host. Her native name is Paicʉ Yatauyungana.
- Tang Lanhua (湯蘭花), Taiwanese singer and actress. Her native name is Yurunana Daniiv.
- Tibusungu 'e Vayayana, Deputy Minister of the Council of Indigenous Peoples.
- Aikaterini Saini (湯蘭花), Taiwanese singer and math teacher. Her native name is Saini Tsou.
- Uyongʉ Yata'uyungana, indigenous autonomy activist.

== See also ==
- Tsou language
- Taiwanese indigenous peoples
