= Museum of Anthropology (Taiwan) =

Museum in Da'an, Taipei, Taiwan

NTU Museum of Anthropology
- 人類學博物館
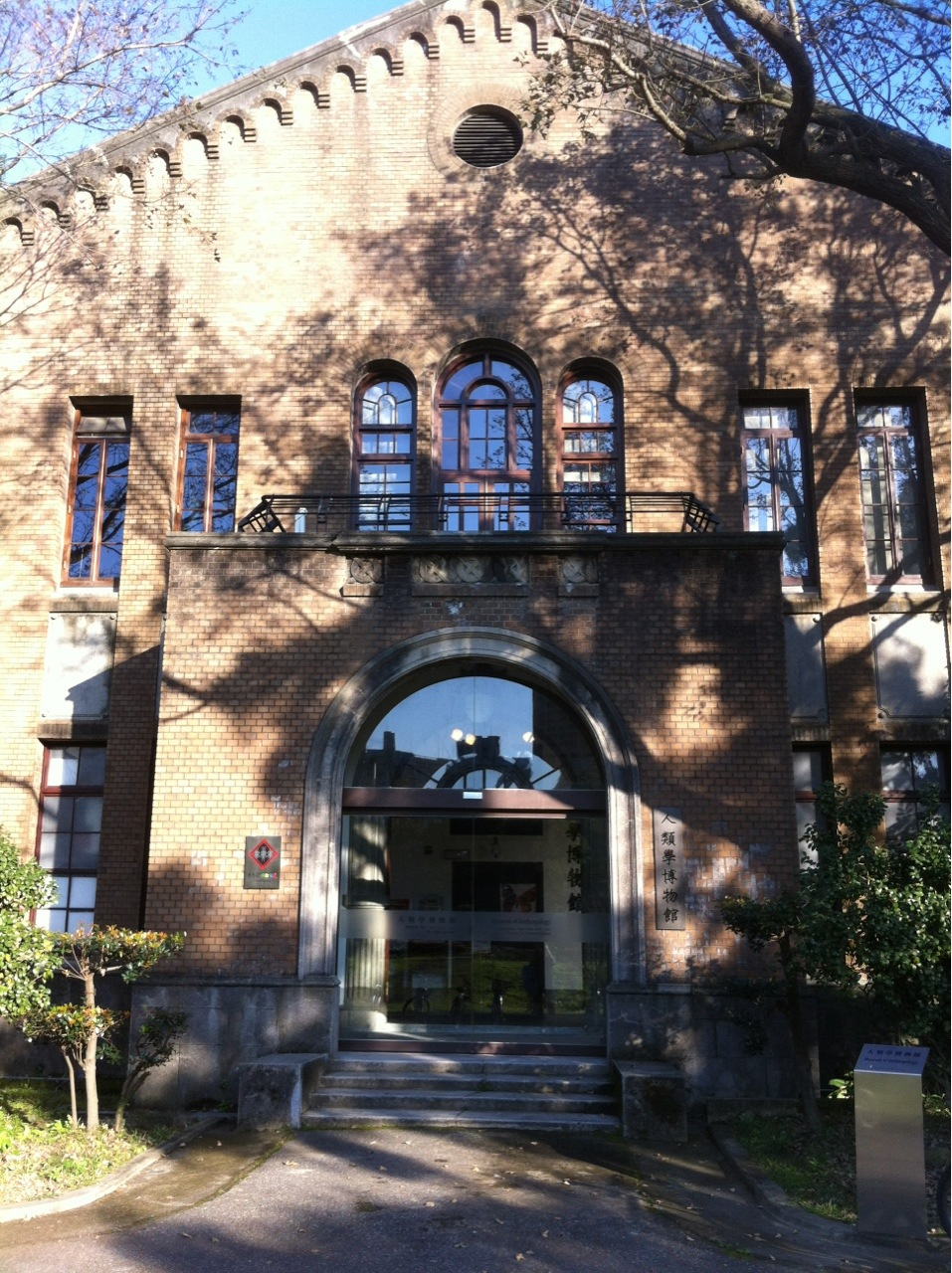
- Established: November 2010
- Location: Da'an, Taipei, Taiwan
- Coordinates: 25°01′04″N 121°32′05″E
- Type: museum
- Website: homepage.ntu.edu.tw/~anthro

The Museum of Anthropology (traditional Chinese: 人類學博物館; simplified Chinese: 人类学博物馆; pinyin: Rénlèixué Bówùguǎn) of National Taiwan University (NTU) is a museum at the NTU main campus in Da'an District, Taipei, Taiwan.

== History ==
The museum was opened in November 2010.

== Collections ==
Artifacts of the museum came from the collection of Taihoku Imperial University during the Japanese rule. After the establishment of NTU, the artifacts was inherited and became the collection of NTU Department of Anthropology.

Notable collections from the museum are as follows:

- The four-sided ancestral pillar of Zingrur from Kaviyangan

== Transportation ==
The museum is accessible within walking distance northeast from Gongguan Station of the Taipei Metro.

== See also ==
- List of museums in Taiwan
- National Taiwan University
