= Hua Chia-chih =

Taiwanese politician (born 1936)

Tjaravak Kadrangian MLY

Member of the National Assembly
- In office 30 May 2005 – 7 June 2005

Chairman of the Council of Aboriginal Affairs
- In office 1 June 1996 – 20 May 2000
- Preceded by: Office established
- Succeeded by: Yohani Isqaqavut

Member of the Legislative Yuan
- In office 1 February 1990 – 31 January 1996
- Preceded by: new seat in multi-member district
- Succeeded by: Chuan Wen-sheng
- Constituency: Highland Aborigine

Member of the Taiwan Provincial Council
- In office 20 December 1973 – 20 December 1981
- Constituency: Highland Aborigine

Personal details
- Born: 2 April 1936 (age 90) Chōshū, Takao Prefecture, Japanese Taiwan
- Party: Kuomintang
- Education: National Taiwan Normal University (BA)

Tjaravak Kadrangian (Paiwan pronunciation: [caˈravak kaɖaˈŋian]; born 2 April 1936) is a Taiwanese politician. Also known by the Chinese name Hua Chia-chi.

== Early life and education ==
Kadrangian was born on 2 April 1936. He attended National Taiwan Normal University, where he graduated with a bachelor's degree in education, and became a teacher.

== Political career ==
He sat on the fifth and sixth convocations of the Taiwan Provincial Council, serving from 1973 to 1981. He was elected to the Legislative Yuan for two terms, in 1990 and 1993.

Kadrangian was appointed the first chairman of the Council of Aboriginal Affairs. In this role, he commented on the unemployment rate amongst indigenous people. Kadrangian later served on the fourth convocation of the National Assembly in 2005.
