= Lee Hung-chun =

Taiwanese engineer and politician

- 李鴻鈞
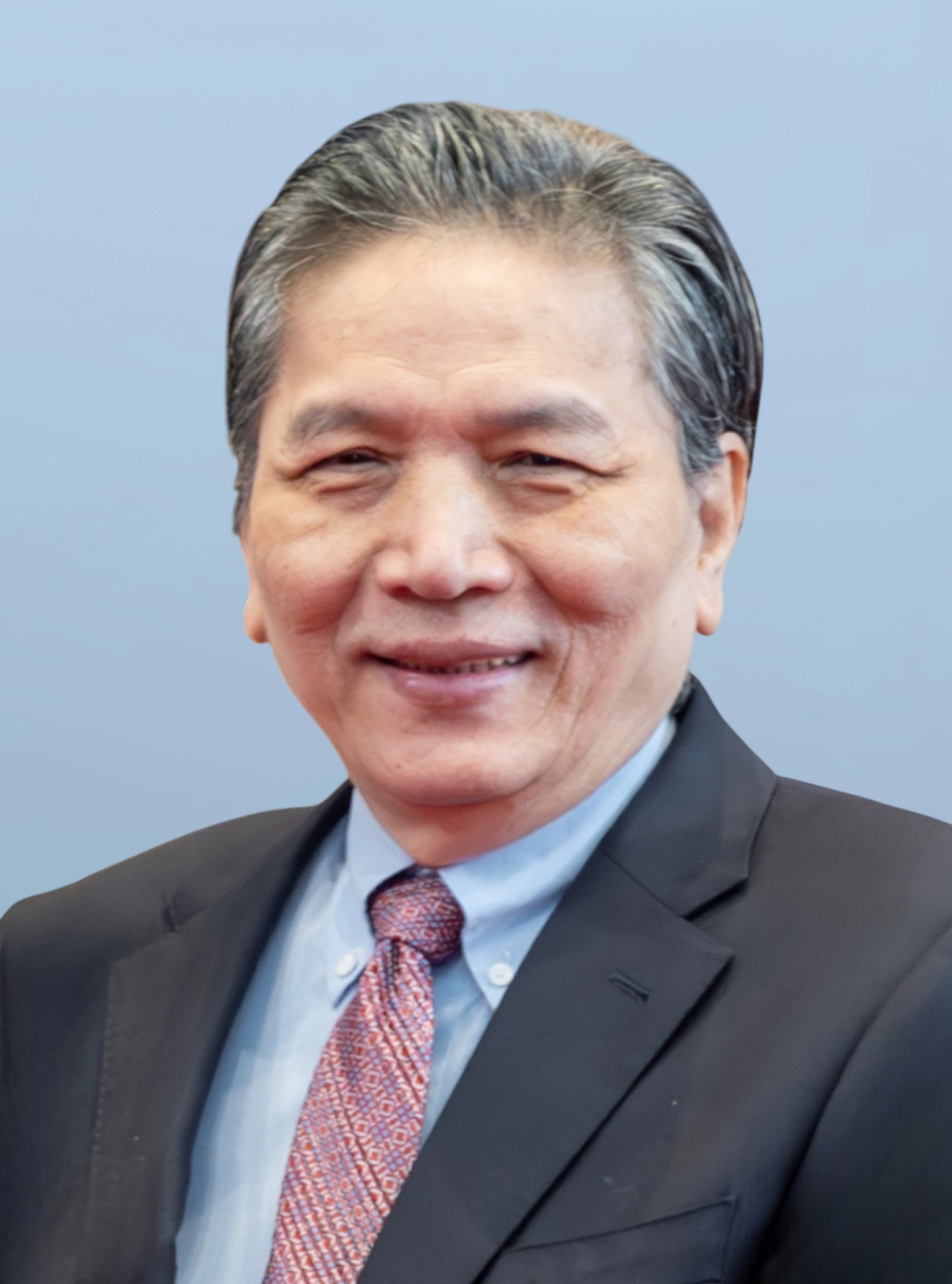
- Lee in 2026

President of the Control Yuan
- In office 10 February 2025 (Note: On behalf of Chen Chu from 10 February 2025 to 1 February 2026.) – 31 July 2026
- President: Lai Ching-te
- Vice President: Himself
- Preceded by: Chen Chu
- Succeeded by: Vacant

6th Vice President of the Control Yuan
- In office 1 August 2022 – 31 July 2026
- Appointed by: Tsai Ing-wen
- President: Chen Chu; Himself (acting)
- Preceded by: Paelabang Danapan
- Succeeded by: Vacant

4th Secretary-General of People First Party
- In office 9 April 2019 – 30 May 2022
- Chairman: James Soong
- Preceded by: Fu Hsueh-peng (acting)
- Succeeded by: Ma Chieh-ming

Member of the Legislative Yuan
- In office 1 February 2002 – 31 January 2020
- Constituency: Taipei County II & IV (2002–2008); New Taipei IV (2008–2016); Party-list (PFP) (2016–2020)

Personal details
- Born: May 11, 1959 (age 67) New Taipei, Taiwan
- Party: Independent (after 2022); People First Party (2000–2022); Kuomintang (2007–2015)
- Relatives: Lee Hong-yuan (brother)
- Education: Lee-Ming Institute of Technology (BS); Nihon University (ME, PhD)

Lee Hung-chun (Chinese: 李鴻鈞; pinyin: Lǐ Hóngjūn; born 11 May 1959) is a Taiwanese engineer and politician who was President of the Control Yuan from 2025 to 2026 and vice president of the Control Yuan from 2022 to 2026. Before his vice-presidency, he served as a member of the Legislative Yuan for eighteen years from 2002 to 2020.

== Early life and education ==
Lee Hung-chun was born in what is now New Taipei City on 11 May 1959. His father, Lee Teng-hui (no relation to former president Lee Teng-hui), was the former head official of Taishan, New Taipei. His elder brother is politician Lee Hong-yuan.

After graduating from the Lee-Ming Institute of Technology, Lee earned an M.E. and Ph.D. in structural engineering from Nihon University in Japan. His doctoral dissertation, written in Japanese, was titled, "ダフィング型応力-ひずみ非線形を有するはり部材の力 学挙動に関する研究" (English: A study of nonlinear stress and strain phenomena of nonlinear duffing as applied to the mechanical behavior of beams). After receiving his doctorate, Lee briefly taught engineering at Nihon University, then returned to Taiwan to work as an architect.

== Political career ==
Lee won election to the Legislative Yuan in 2001 as a People First Party candidate for Taipei County's second district. He retained the office in 2004. Lee subsequently served two consecutive terms as legislator representing Taipei County's fourth district, followed by a single term on the PFP party list. As the Ninth Legislative Yuan opened, Lee received four votes to serve as the body's speaker. Though Lee ranked second on the party list during the 2020 legislative election, the People First Party lost all of its seats and was supplanted as a third party by the Taiwan People's Party.

In May 2022, Tsai Ing-wen nominated Lee for the vacant vice presidency of the Control Yuan. Lee stated that he would resign his position as PFP secretary-general, which he had held since 2019, as well as his party membership. He was formally confirmed to the Control Yuan on 24 May 2022 by a 99–2 vote of the Legislative Yuan. Following the resignation of Control Yuan president Chen Chu, announced in January 2026, Lee was appointed to lead the Control Yuan.
