= Iwan Nawi =

Taiwanese politician

- 伊萬·納威
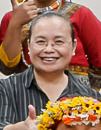

Member of the Examination Yuan
- In office 1 September 2020 – 31 August 2024
- Appointed by: Tsai Ing-wen

Deputy Minister of Council of Indigenous Peoples
- In office 20 May 2016 – 31 August 2020
- Minister: Icyang Parod

Personal details
- Education: Chinese Culture University (BA); National Chengchi University (MA, PhD)

Iwan Nawi (traditional Chinese: 伊萬·納威; simplified Chinese: 伊万·纳威; pinyin: Yīwàn Nàwēi) is a Taiwanese Seediq politician and ethnologist. She had served as Deputy Minister of the Council of Indigenous Peoples and a member of the Examination Yuan.

== Education ==
Iwan graduated from Chinese Culture University with a bachelor's degree in Chinese literature. She then earned a master's degree in ethnology and her Ph.D. in ethnology from National Chengchi University. Her doctoral dissertation was titled, "The development of Taiwan's indigenous policy: An analysis of identity, language, and livelihoods" (Chinese: 台灣原住民族政策的發展：透過身份、語言、生計的分析).
