= Paelabang Danapan =

Taiwanese sinologist and politician

Paelabang Danapan Sun Ta-chuan
- 孫大川
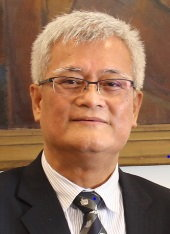

Senior Advisor to the President
- In office 9 February 2021 – 20 May 2024
- President: Tsai Ing-wen

5th Vice President of the Control Yuan
- In office 1 August 2014 – 1 August 2020
- Appointed by: Ma Ying-jeou
- CY President: Chang Po-ya
- Preceded by: Chen Jinn-lih
- Succeeded by: Lee Hung-chun (2022)

Minister of Council of Indigenous Peoples
- In office 10 September 2009 – 1 August 2013
- Prime Minister: Wu Den-yih; Sean Chen; Jiang Yi-huah
- Deputy: Hung Liang-chuan; Hsu Ming-yuan; Lin Chiang-yi
- Preceded by: Chang Jen-hsiang
- Succeeded by: Lin Chiang-yi

Personal details
- Born: 18 December 1953 (age 72)
- Education: National Taiwan University (BA); Fu Jen Catholic University (BPhil); Catholic University of Louvain (PhD)

Paelabang Danapan (Chinese: 巴厄拉邦; born 18 December 1953), also known as Sun Ta-chuan (Chinese: 孫大川; pinyin: Sūn Dàchuān), is a Taiwanese sinologist and politician. He had served as Director of Indigenous Development & Chair of Indigenous Language and Communication at NDHU College of Indigenous Studies from 2002-2006, as Minister of the Council of Indigenous Peoples from 2009 to 2013 and Vice President of the Control Yuan from 2014 to 2020.

Nowaday, he is the Professor Emeritus at NDHU College of Indigenous Studies. Sun is a member of the Puyuma tribe in Taiwan, and is also a Roman Catholic.

== Education ==
Paelabang Danapan received his bachelor's degree in Chinese literature from National Taiwan University, and bachelor's degree in philosophy from Fu Jen Catholic University. He then earned his Ph.D. in sinology from the Catholic University of Louvain (KU Leuven) in Belgium.

== Early career ==
Before entering politics, Paelabang Danapan was a professor of indigenous languages and communication & indigenous development at National Dong Hwa University College of Indigenous Studies (2002-2006) and a professor at the National Chengchi University (2006-2009). In 1993, he founded the Mountain Sea Culture Magazine, the first publication to dedicated to Taiwanese indigenous culture and literature. The Mountain Sea Literature Awards, sponsored by the publication starting in 1995, were the first literary awards for indigenous writers.
