= Icyang Parod =

Taiwanese amis politician (born 1960)

- 夷將·拔路兒
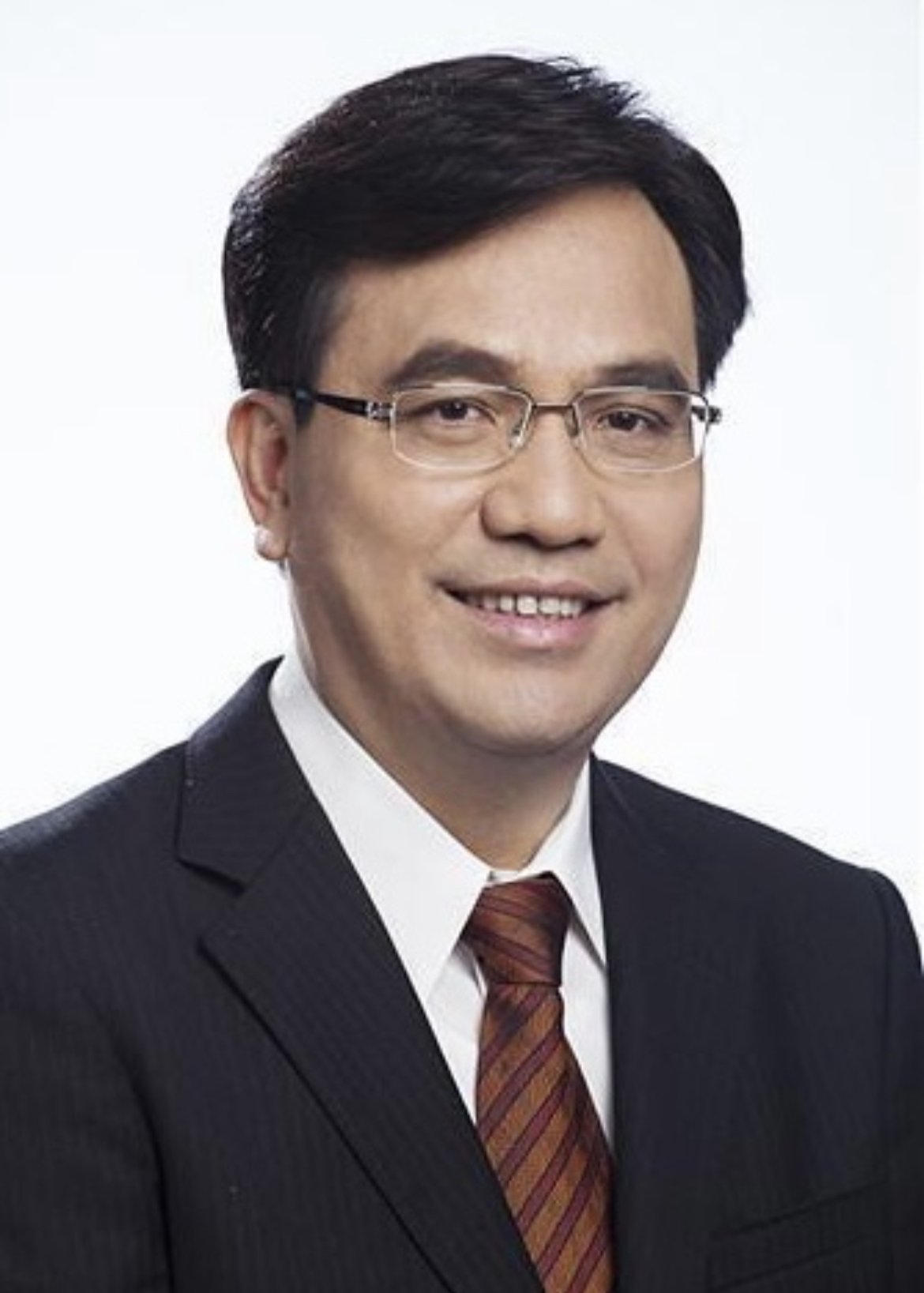
- Official portrait, 2020

5th & 9th Minister of Indigenous Affairs
- In office 20 May 2016 – 20 May 2024
- Prime Minister: Lin Chuan; Lai Ching-te; Su Tseng-chang; Chen Chien-jen
- Deputy: Calivat Gadu; Iwan Nawi; Tibusungu 'e Vayayana
- Preceded by: Lin Chiang-yi
- Succeeded by: Ljaucu Zingrur
- In office 21 May 2007 – 20 May 2008
- Prime Minister: Chang Chun-hsiung
- Preceded by: Walis Pelin
- Succeeded by: Chang Jen-hsiang

New Taipei City Councillor
- In office 25 December 2010 – 20 May 2016
- Constituency: New Taipei 11

Personal details
- Born: 2 December 1960 (age 65) Hualien County, Taiwan
- Party: Democratic Progressive Party
- Education: National Taiwan University (BA)

Icyang Parod (Chinese: 夷將·拔路兒; pinyin: Yíjiāng Bálùer; Chinese name: Chinese: 劉文雄; pinyin: Liú Wénxióng; born 2 December 1960) is a Taiwanese Amis politician. He served as the Minister of the Council of Indigenous Peoples (CIP) from 2007 to 2008 and took office again in 2016.

== Education and activism ==
Icyang was a leader in the Taiwanese aboriginal rights movement throughout the 1980s. In 1983, he and two other National Taiwan University students established High Green Mountain, a publication that advocated for aboriginal culture. Icyang obtained his bachelor's degree in political science from National Taiwan University in 1984.

== Council of Indigenous Peoples ==
=== Apology to Taiwanese aborigines ===
Speaking at a news conference in December 2016, Icyang said that formal apology made by President Tsai Ing-wen to the Taiwanese aboriginal communities on 1 August 2016 was the first step towards reconciliation and peace, it was also the first time for any head of state in Asia to do such thing. He said that the CIP would also plan to publish the full apology text into 16 Taiwanese aboriginal languages as well as in English and Japanese. This is also another way for the government to show their willingness in preserving and advancing the aboriginal languages.

=== 2019 Palau visit ===
On 27 September until 2 October 2019, Parod and delegation make an official visit to Palau to attend the nation's independence day on 1 October. The delegation also attended the International Austronesian Language Revitalization Forum on 29 September, which is jointly organized by Council of Indigenous Peoples, Ministry of Foreign Affairs of the Republic of China, American Institute in Taiwan and Japan–Taiwan Exchange Association.
