= List of vice presidents of the Control Yuan =

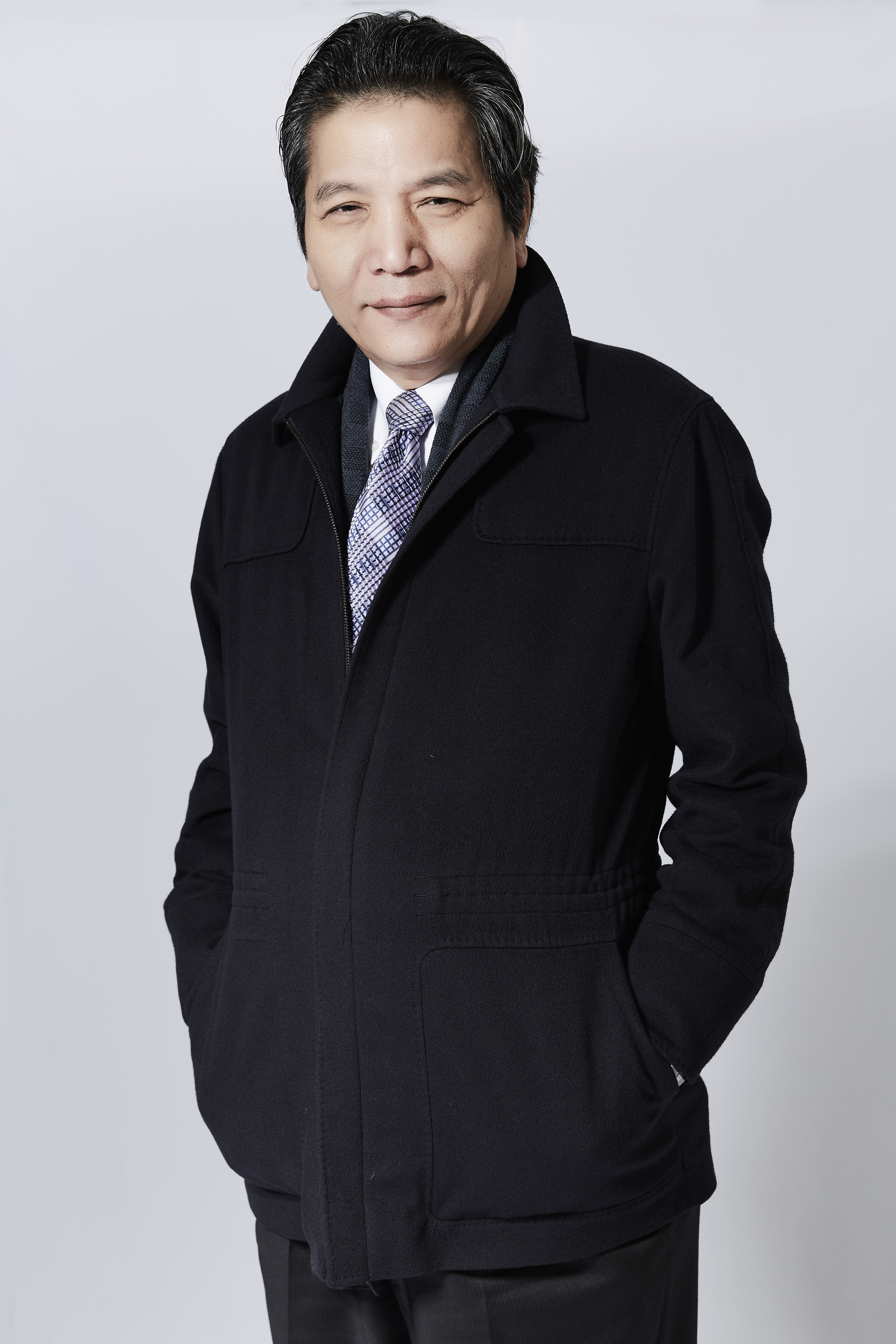
Incumbent Vice President, Lee Hung-chun

This is a list of vice presidents of the Control Yuan:

== List ==
Kuomintang (Nationalist) Independent People First Party

=== Before the 1947 constitution ===
- Period: 1928 – 1948

No.	Portrait	Name (Birth–Death)	Took office	Left office	Term	Political party	President
1		Chen Guofu 陳果夫; Chén Guǒfu (1892–1951)	8 October 1928	27 December 1931	—	Kuomintang	Tan Yankai (Kuomintang)
1		Chen Guofu 陳果夫; Chén Guǒfu (1892–1951)	8 October 1928	27 December 1931	—	Kuomintang	Chiang Kai-shek (Kuomintang)
1		Chen Guofu 陳果夫; Chén Guǒfu (1892–1951)	8 October 1928	27 December 1931	—	Kuomintang	Lin Sen (Kuomintang)
2		Ding Weifen 丁惟汾; Ding Wéifén (1874–1954)	28 December 1931	6 December 1935	—	Kuomintang	Lin Sen (Kuomintang)
3		Xu Chongzhi 許崇智; Xǔ Chóngzhì (1887–1965)	7 December 1935	26 December 1941	—	Kuomintang	Lin Sen (Kuomintang)
4		Liu Shangqing 劉尚清; Liǘ Shàngqing (1868–1947)	27 December 1941	19 February 1947	—	Kuomintang	Lin Sen (Kuomintang)
4		Liu Shangqing 劉尚清; Liǘ Shàngqing (1868–1947)	27 December 1941	19 February 1947	—	Kuomintang	Chiang Kai-shek (Kuomintang)
5		Huang Shaohong 黃紹竑; Huáng Shàohóng (1895–1966)	7 June 1947	26 October 1947	—	Kuomintang	Chiang Kai-shek (Kuomintang)
6		Liu Zhe 劉哲; Liǘ Zhé (1880–1954)	27 October 1947	4 June 1948	—	Kuomintang	Chiang Kai-shek (Kuomintang)

=== After the 1947 constitution (indirect elections) ===
- Period: 1948 – 1993

No.	Portrait	Name (Birth–Death)	Took office	Left office	Term	Electoral mandates (Supplementary elections)	Political party	President
6		Liu Zhe 劉哲; Liǘ Zhé (1880–1954); MCY for Jilin at-large	12 June 1948	6 January 1954	1	1948	Kuomintang	Chiang Kai-shek (KMT)
7		Liang Shang-tung 梁上棟; Liáng Shàngdòng (1887–1957); MCY for Shanxi at-large	18 August 1954	11 July 1957	1		Kuomintang	Chiang Kai-shek (KMT)
8		Lee Shih-tsung 李嗣璁; Lǐ Sìcōng (1898–1972); MCY for Hebei at-large	12 April 1958	16 August 1965	1		Kuomintang	Chiang Kai-shek (KMT)
9		Chang Wei-han 張維翰; Zhāng Weíhàn (1886–1979); MCY for Yunnan at-large	2 November 1965	18 March 1973	1	1969; 1973	Kuomintang	Chiang Kai-shek (KMT)
10		Chou Pai-lien 周百鍊; Zhou Bǎiliàn (1909–1991); MCY for Taipei at-large	19 March 1973	23 March 1981	1	1980	Kuomintang	Chiang Kai-shek (KMT)
10		Chou Pai-lien 周百鍊; Zhou Bǎiliàn (1909–1991); MCY for Taipei at-large	19 March 1973	23 March 1981	1	1980	Kuomintang	Yen Chia-kan (KMT)
10		Chou Pai-lien 周百鍊; Zhou Bǎiliàn (1909–1991); MCY for Taipei at-large	19 March 1973	23 March 1981	1	1980	Kuomintang	Chiang Ching-kuo (KMT)
11		Huang Tsun-chiu 黃尊秋; Huáng Zūnqiū (1923–2000); MCY for Taiwan at-large	24 March 1981	11 March 1987	1	1987	Kuomintang	Chiang Ching-kuo (KMT)
12		Ma Kung-chun 馬空群; Mǎ Kongqún (1910–2007); MCY for Guizhou at-large	12 March 1987	29 December 1991	1		Kuomintang	Chiang Ching-kuo (KMT)
12		Ma Kung-chun 馬空群; Mǎ Kongqún (1910–2007); MCY for Guizhou at-large	12 March 1987	29 December 1991	1		Kuomintang	Lee Teng-hui (KMT)
13		Lin Rong-san 林榮三; Lín Róngsan (1939–2015); MCY for Taiwan at-large	20 February 1992	31 January 1993	1		Kuomintang	Lee Teng-hui (KMT)

=== After the 1947 Constitution (presidential nomination) ===
- Period: 1993 – present

No.	Portrait	Name (Birth–Death)	Took office	Left office	Term	Political party	President
14		Cheng Shuei-chih 鄭水枝; Zhèng Shuǐzhī (1926–2020)	1 February 1993	31 January 1999	2	Kuomintang	Lee Teng-hui (KMT)
15		Cheng Meng-lin 陳孟鈴; Chén Mènglíng (1934–2009)	1 February 1999	31 January 2005	3	Kuomintang	Lee Teng-hui (KMT)
15		Cheng Meng-lin 陳孟鈴; Chén Mènglíng (1934–2009)	1 February 1999	31 January 2005	3	Kuomintang	Chen Shui-bian (DPP)
Post vacant							Chen Shui-bian (DPP)
Post vacant							Ma Ying-jeou (KMT)
—		Shen Fu-hsiung 沈富雄; Shěn Fùxióng (1939– )	Confirmation rejected by the Legislative Yuan		4	Independent	Ma Ying-jeou (KMT)
Post vacant							Ma Ying-jeou (KMT)
16		Chen Jinn-lih 陳進利; Chén Jìnlì (1942– )	1 December 2008	31 July 2014	4	Kuomintang	Ma Ying-jeou (KMT)
17		Sun Ta-chuan (Paelabang Danapan) 孫大川; Sūn Dàchuān (1953– )	1 August 2014	31 July 2020	5	Independent	Ma Ying-jeou (KMT)
17		Sun Ta-chuan (Paelabang Danapan) 孫大川; Sūn Dàchuān (1953– )	1 August 2014	31 July 2020	5	Independent	Tsai Ing-wen (DPP)
Post vacant							Tsai Ing-wen (DPP)
18		Lee Hung-chun 李鴻鈞; Lǐ Hóngjūn (1959– )	30 May 2022	Incumbent	6	People First Party	Tsai Ing-wen (DPP)
