= Cudjuy Patjidres =

Traditional Taiwanese tattoo artist

Cudjuy Patjidres (Paiwan pronunciation: [ˈt͡suɟuj paˈciɖəs]) is a tattoo artist. He belongs to the Paiwan, a Taiwanese indigenous group.

== Biography ==
Cudjuy Patjidres is a native of Taimali Town in Taitung County, southeastern Taiwan, where he grew up. He has been drawing since he was very young. At university he came across a Japanese book, The Culture of Taiwan's Early Inhabitants: The Rebirth of Reunion, which featured old photographs of tattooed natives. A black and white photo caught his eye. Looking at the hairstyle of the person in the photo, Cudjuy guessed that the person in the photo must be from a Paiwan ethnic group like him. So he copied the Japanese characters from the photo and asked a friend who knew Japanese to confirm that it was indeed a photo of the Paiwan people.

He then undertook research work on the tattoos of the Paiwan people, whose ancestral tattoo tradition was banned under the Japanese occupation and ended up dying out at the end of the twentieth century. His research led him to come into contact with other traditional tattoo artists from the Pacific, and to re-appropriate traditional tattoo techniques. In 2015, he traveled to New Zealand to attend the annual Austronesian Tattoo Conference and met Keone Nunes, a Hawaiian tattoo artist. After his return, he began to reappropriate the technique of ancestral tattooing with a comb and to tattoo himself then to tattoo those around him with traditional motifs. Before tattooing someone, Cudjuy Patjidres will first confirm the social class of the family of the tattooed person will follow traditional rituals and perform the tattoo without violating taboos. Cudjuy Patjidres is currently the sole curator and heir of the traditional Paiwan tattoo culture.

== Filmography ==
- Made in Paiwan, documentary written and directed by Jonathan Bougard. 31 mins. In Vivo Prod 2019
- Skinindigneous: Taiwan, documentary written and directed by Randy Kelly. 26 mins. Nish television 2020
