= Lin Chiang-yi =

Taiwanese politician

- 林江義
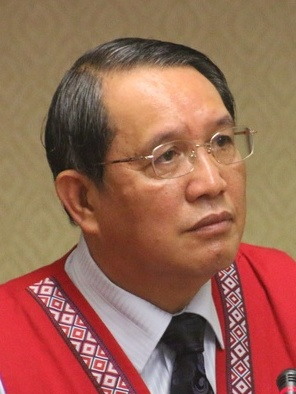

Minister of Council of Indigenous Peoples of the Republic of China
- In office 1 August 2013 – 20 May 2016
- Deputy: Chen Cheng-chia
- Preceded by: Sun Ta-chuan
- Succeeded by: Icyang Parod

Deputy Minister of Council of Indigenous Peoples of the Republic of China
- In office 2008 – 31 July 2013
- Minister: Chang Jen-hsiang; Sun Ta-chuan

Personal details
- Born: 30 October 1949 (age 75) Taiwan
- Political party: Kuomintang
- Education: National Taiwan University (LLB); National Chengchi University (MA)

Lin Chiang-yi (Chinese: 林江義; pinyin: Lín Jiāngyì; born 30 October 1949), also known as Mayaw Dongi, is a Taiwanese politician. He served as the Minister of the Council of Indigenous Peoples (CIP) from 1 August 2013 until 20 May 2016. He is of Amis descent, one of the indigenous peoples of Taiwan.

== Education and early career ==
Lin obtained his bachelor's degree in law from National Taiwan University in 1974. He then obtained his master's degree in ethnology from National Chengchi University in 2004.

Upon graduation from his bachelor's degree university, Lin worked as an officer at Yanping Township Office in Taitung County in 1977–1980. In 1980, he worked as an officer of the Subsection Chief and Secretary of the Department of Civil Affairs of the Taiwan Provincial Government until 1987. He then moved to the Ministry of the Interior where he worked as Specialist and Section Chief of the Department of Civil Affairs in 1987–1996. In 1996–1997, he worked as the Chief Secretary of the Indigenous Peoples Commission of the Taipei City Government. In 1997, he started to work as the Director of Department of Education and Culture and the Department of Planning of the CIP. After receiving his master's degree in 2004, he worked as the Chief Secretary of the CIP until 2008.

== CIP Ministry ==
=== Hla’alua and Kanakanvu tribes recognition ===
Speaking at Legislative Yuan plenary session in February 2014, Lin said that the Hla’alua and Kanakanvu tribe of Taiwanese aborigines can be recognized as the 15th and 16th aboriginal tribes, stating that those two groups are still currently treated as part of the Tsou group of Kaohsiung.

=== Declining of the aboriginal language use ===
In August 2014, Lin voiced his concern with the declining usage of Taiwan aboriginal languages among the Taiwanese aborigines. He called on the aborigines to put more efforts to reviving their languages, warning that ethnic groups would vanish soon after their languages disappear. He made the remarks after a survey done on the Amis, Bunun, Nataoran, Puyuma, Saisiyat and Thao languages. The survey also revealed that Puyuma language would be added to the endangered languages list.
