= Paiwan people =

Taiwanese indigenous people

Kacalisian
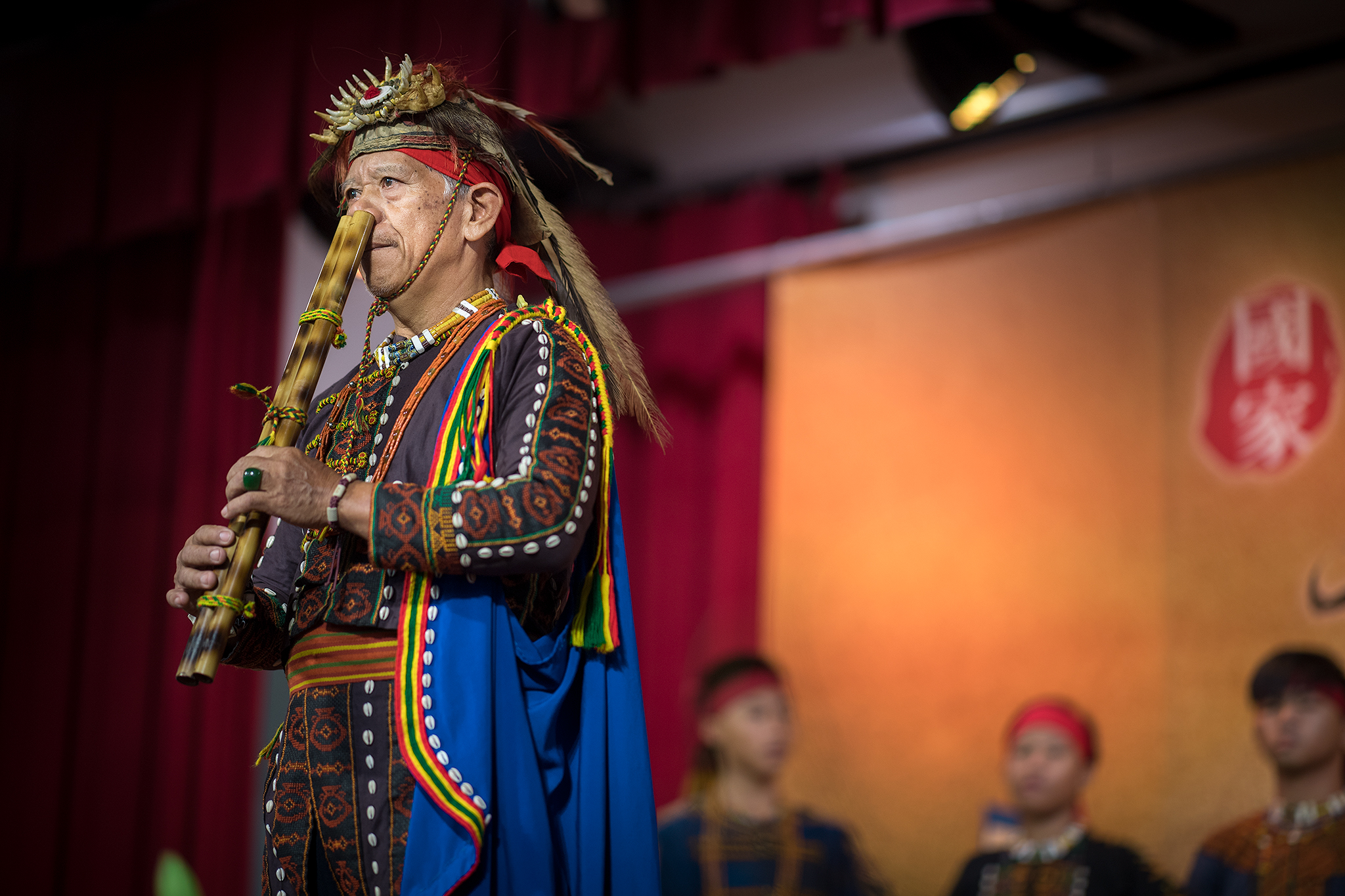
- Paiwan musician playing a bamboo nose flute.

Total population
- 104,555 (Nov 2021)

Regions with significant populations
- Taiwan

Languages
- Paiwan, Mandarin

Religion
- Animism, Christianity

Related ethnic groups
- Malayo-Polynesians, Taiwanese Indigenous peoples

The Paiwan (Paiwan: Kacalisian; Chinese: 排灣; pinyin: Páiwān) are an Indigenous people of Taiwan. They speak the Paiwan language. In 2014, Paiwan people numbered 96,334. This was approximately 17.8% of Taiwan's total Indigenous population, making them the second-largest Indigenous group (after the Amis people).

The majority of Paiwan people live in the southern chain of the Central Mountain Range, from Damumu Mountain and the upper Wuluo River in the north of the southern chain to the Hengchun Peninsula in the south of it, and also in the hills and coastal plains of southeastern Taiwan. There are two subgroups under the Paiwan people: the Ravar and the Vuculj.

The unique ceremonies in Paiwan are Masalut and Maljeveq. The Masalut is a ceremony that celebrates the harvest of rice, whereas the Maljeveq commemorates their ancestors or gods.

== History ==
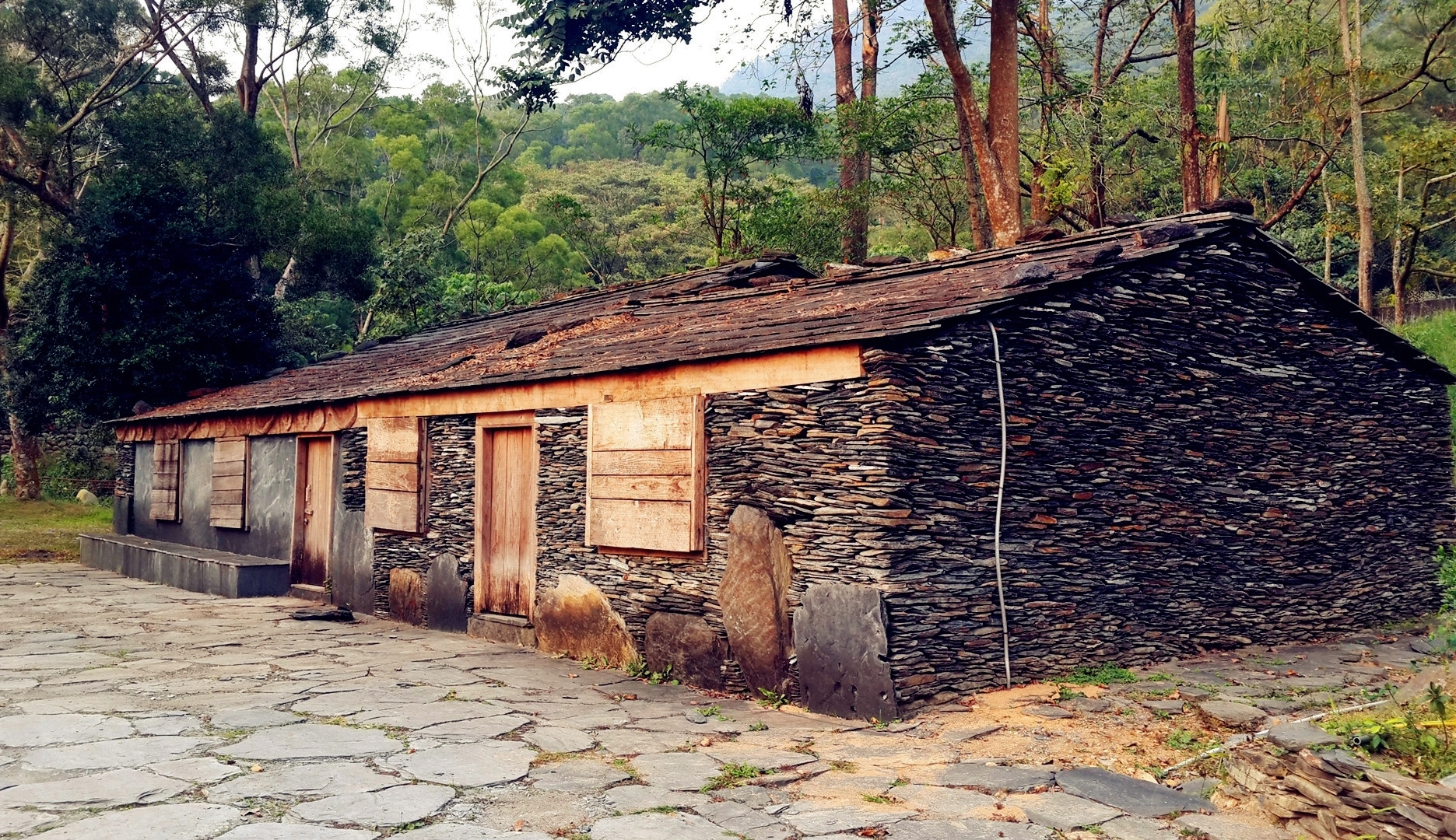
A Paiwan family house in Sandimen.

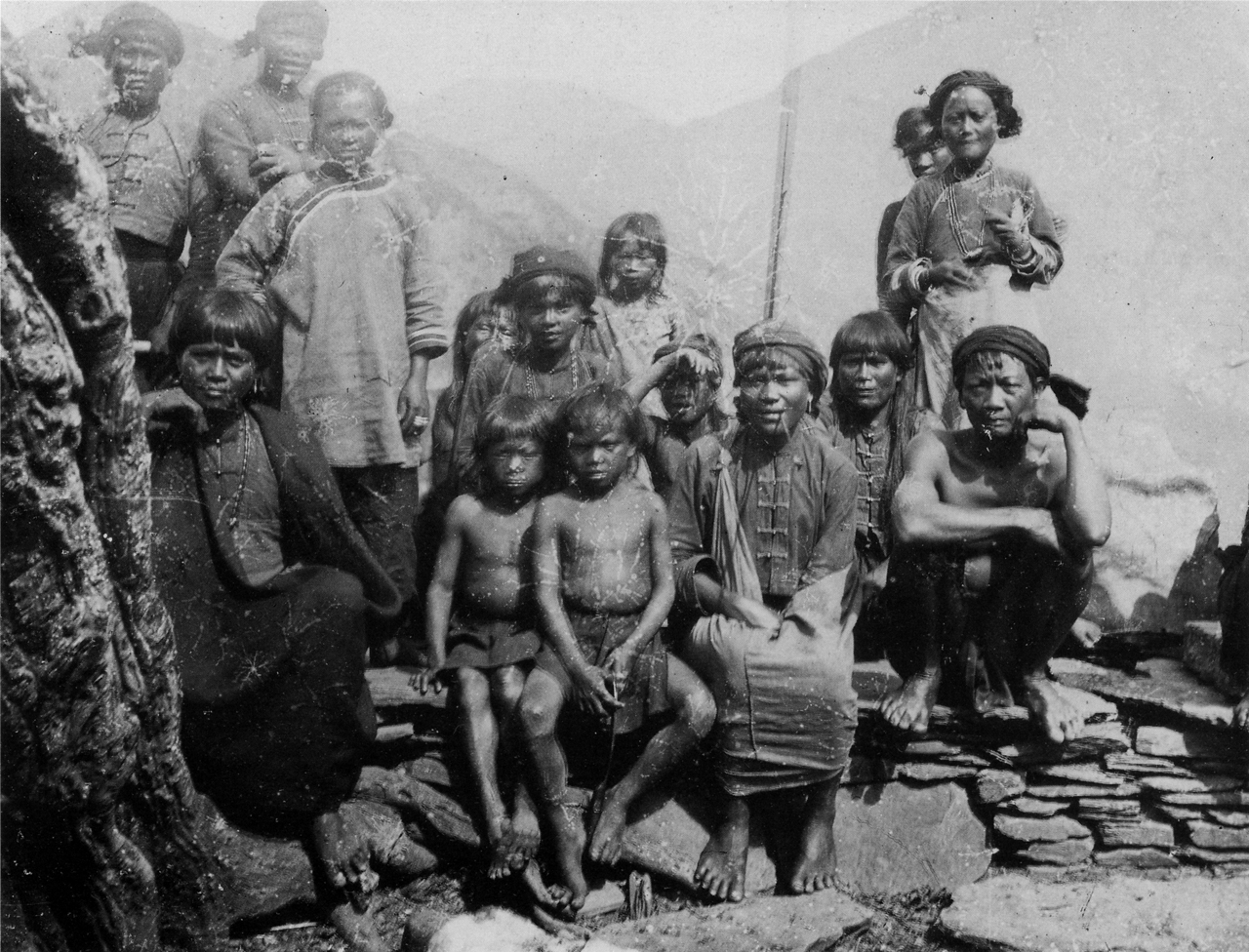
Photo of Paiwan people during the Japanese rule of Taiwan taken by Torii Ryūzō. Note the non-traditional Chinese attire

The name "Paiwan" may have originated from a myth. According to the myth, Paiwan ancestors lived in a location on Dawu mountain (Tawushan) that was called "Paiwan", where heaven is said to exist. Paiwan people have spread out from this location, so the name of the original place was assumed as their group name. According to some group members, "Paiwan" also means "human being".

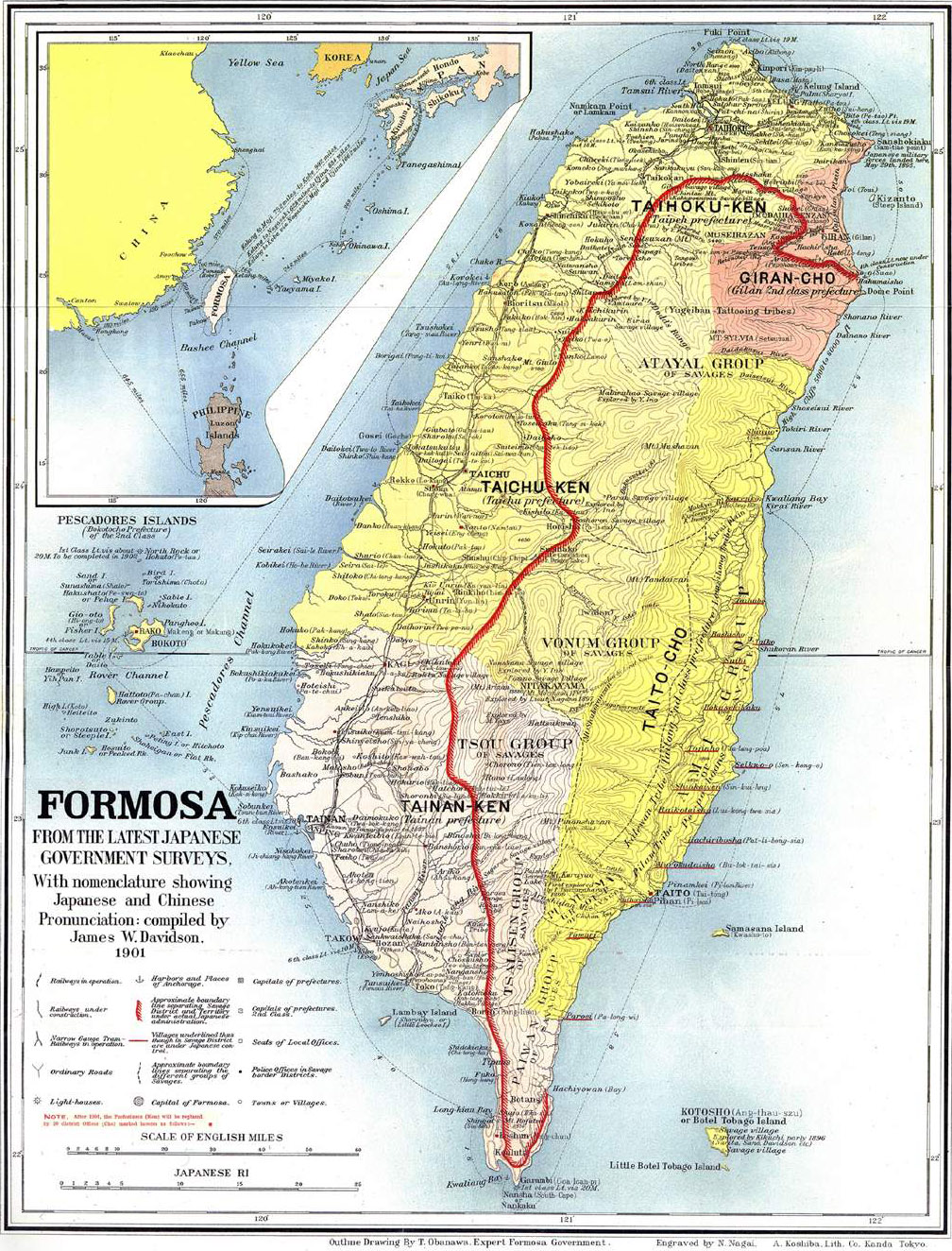
Taiwan in 1901, with the Paiwan marked as "Paiwan Group of Savages" on the southern tip of the island.

One of the most important figures in Paiwan history was supreme chief Tok-a-Tok (c. 1817–1874), (Note: His Paiwan name was written in Chinese characters as 卓杞篤 or 卓其督, both pronounced Tok-ki-tok in Hokkien. These names were also transcribed into English as Toketok or Tauketok.) who united 18 tribes of Paiwan under his rule, and after defeating American Marines during the Formosa Expedition in 1867, he concluded a formal agreement with Chinese and Western leaders to ensure the safety of foreign ships landing on their coastal territories in return for amnesty for Paiwan tribesmen who had killed the crew of the barque Rover in March 1867 (see Rover incident).

In 1871 a Ryūkyūan vessel shipwrecked on the southern tip of Taiwan, and 54 of the 66 survivors were beheaded by the Paiwan people (Mudan Incident). When Japan sought compensation from Qing China, the court rejected the demand on the grounds that Taiwan's "raw" or "wild" natives (Chinese: 臺灣生番; pinyin: Táiwān shēngfān) were outside its jurisdiction. This perceived renunciation of sovereignty led to the Japanese invasion of Taiwan in 1874 in which chief Tok-a-Tok was killed in action.

During the Chinese Civil War, between 1946 and 1949, many Paiwan men were forcibly enlisted in the Kuomintang forces. When the war ended, some of the Paiwan remained behind in China and formed their own communities.

Tsai Ing-wen, elected as President of Taiwan in 2016, is ¼ Paiwan via her grandmother.

In 2023, the skulls of four Paiwan warriors were returned to the tribe after being taken as trophies during the Japanese invasion in 1874 and subsequently transferred to the collection of the University of Edinburgh in 1907.

== Customs ==
Unlike other peoples in Taiwan, Paiwan society is divided into classes with a hereditary aristocracy. The Paiwan are not allowed to marry outside their group. On the day of their "five-yearly rite," all marriage-seeking Paiwan men try to cut down as many trees as possible and offer the firewood thus procured to the family of the girl they want to marry.

Tattooed hands are a tradition of both Paiwan and Rukai peoples. Noble women used to receive these tattoos as a rite of passage into adulthood. However, the practice has been less common since the Japanese colonial era, as it was discouraged and fined during that time. Shamans would tattoo hands in different patterns for different personal backgrounds. Less noble women could have received it, but they had to pay a hefty price on top of inviting all members of the community to a banquet with the purpose of gaining the community's approval. Less noble women also had different tattoo designs than noblewomen. The painful tattooing process represented dignity and honor and the suffering that one could endure, lasting as long as it needs to with consideration for many taboos and nuances, such as praying. For example, pregnant women were not allowed to watch the process and no one watching was allowed to sneeze. If any taboos were broken, the ritual would be put off until another day chosen.

In February 2015, Li Lin, the oldest Paiwan person with hand tattoos, died at the age of 102. Li Lin had her hand tattoos starting at the age of 14 before marrying a village head as a common girl. She played a large role in promoting the cultural art form and continues to be an icon of cultural identity even in her death.

== Clothing ==
The Paiwan people have a unique clothing scheme with details that differentiate societal class, gender, and ceremonies. Materials used for clothing started out as bark fibers and pelts, but linen, cotton, and wool fabrics later became popular. The men wear circular-collar long-sleeved short chest coverings with buttons down the front and kilts, and a shawl slung over the shoulder. Women wear circular-collar robes but with buttons going down along their right side with panel skirts, and leggings. In addition, they wear head scarves, elaborate head rings, or forehead bands. In solemn ceremonies, Paiwan men wear ceremonial headwear, long vests, leg coverings, and sword baldrics. As for dance attire, there is no difference in clothing, however it is common to wear one's nicest clothes for special occasions. When children grew up and were about to get married, the mothers personally made their traditional clothing for them.

Intricate and grand patterns, totems, and clothing are exclusively for nobles and the chief in the Paiwan group. Designs with elements such as human heads, human figures or hundred pace vipers, are used to distinguish those of high class from the rest of society. The chief and other high society of the Paiwan people also use tattoos to distinguish themselves. Commoners with special achievements are honored with tattoo(s) on their body and/or hands.

Embroidery is popularly done with bright colors over dark, commonly black, backgrounds. Embroidery is used for telling stories, sharing one's memories, and legends/folktales. Hundred-pacer snakes, elements, and symbols such as the Sun and Sun god are used solely for nobility, as they represent power. Designs with human heads and ancestral spirits signify protection, while warriors and crossed-shaped patterns are symbols shamans can use to ward off evil. Patterns with flowers and grass are for ordinary people and hunting knives and animals are also common, while butterflies symbolize innocent young girls.

== Religion ==
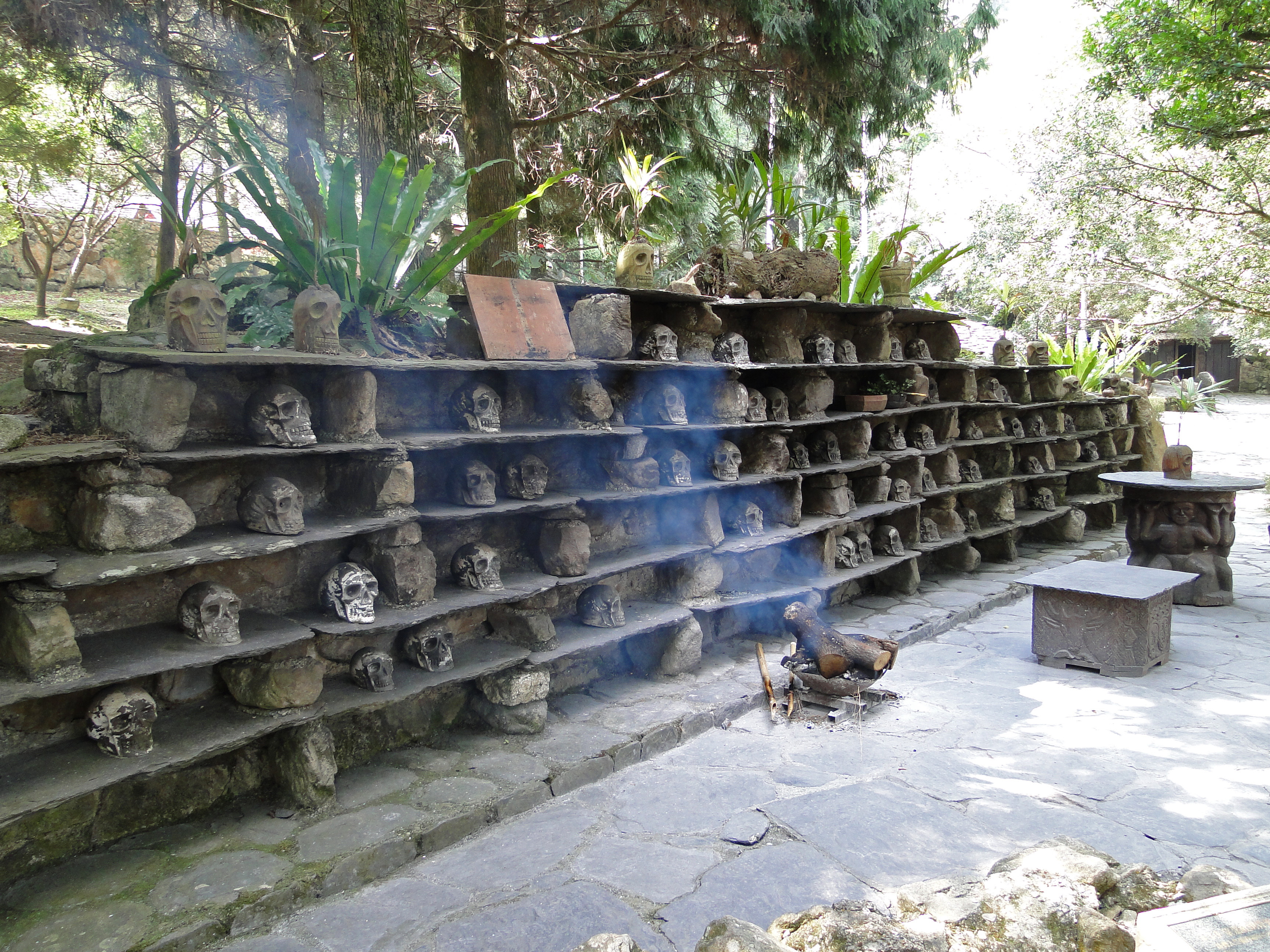
A representation of a Paiwan ceremonial rack of skulls in Formosan Aboriginal Culture Village.

Traditionally, Paiwan people have been polytheists. Their wooden carvings included images of human heads, snakes, deer, and geometric designs. In Taiwan, the Bataul branch of the Paiwan peoples holds a major sacrifice – called maleveq – every five years to invite the spirits of their ancestors to come and bless them. Djemuljat is an activity in the Maleveq in which the participants thrust bamboo poles into cane balls symbolizing human heads.

=== Shamanism ===
Shamanism has been described as an important part of Paiwan culture. Paiwan shamanism is traditionally seen as being inherited by bloodline. However, a decline in the number of Paiwan shamans has raised concerns that traditional rituals might be lost; and has led to the founding of a shamanism school to pass on the rituals to a new generation.

=== Christianity ===
Thousands of Paiwan people in Taiwan converted to Christianity in the late 1940s and 1950s. Today, the Presbyterian church in Taiwan reports 14,900 Paiwan members, meeting in 96 congregations. The New Testament has been translated into Paiwan. The Catholic Church is also very active, though the number of young people attending is falling.

== Heritage ==
In May 2015, two Paiwan totem poles were listed as ROC national treasures by the Bureau of Cultural Heritage under the Ministry of Culture. Both of these artifacts were acquired by the National Taiwan University during the Japanese colonial period (1895–1945). They were submitted for national treasure listing earlier in 2015.

The Paiwan language is one of Taiwan's 42 Indigenous tongues and dialects, and one of nine that are listed as vulnerable on the UNESCO atlas of endangered languages.

The Paiwan Nose flute (Lalingedan)

The lalingedan, or double-pipe nose flute, is a quintessential symbol of Paiwan musical heritage. Characterized by its unique two-part polyphonic structure, it consists of a melody pipe (qivuivu) and a drone pipe (zemangrau). Acoustically, the instrument produces a distinctive "breathy timbre" due to the low pressure of nasal exhalation, a sound revered as the unadorned "voice of the soul" and synesthetically linked to the calls of the Hundred-pace Snake, the tribe's ancestral protector. Traditionally, its performance was a privilege of noblemen or accomplished hunters, used to articulate complex emotions of longing (saluveljengen) or mourning (talimuzav). The music relies heavily on the harmonic series and micro-ornamentations like vibrato and glissando to mimic human sobbing. In the late 20th century, modern adaptations introduced six-hole designs and twelve-tone equal temperament, enabling the instrument to perform contemporary repertoire while sparking academic dialogue on the preservation of its traditional low-frequency aesthetic.

The Paiwan nose flute is made using two nodes of bamboo, one with finger holes and one without. The pipe without fingerholes is called the drone pipe or zemangrau and is aptly named as it emits a steady and constant droning noise when played and the pipe with finger holes or qivuivu produces the main melody of the nose flute. When making the 5 finger holes, the first is marked 10 cm from the bottom of the flute and the subsequent 4 are measured according to the most suitable playing distance for each player's hands. A heated iron rod is used to pierce the holes at an angle for the best sound production. That same hot rod is used to make the air hole on top of the flute. Once the flute has been prepared, the final step is carving designs onto the flute. Typically the designs carved are geometric in nature resembling the markings of the Hundred Pacer Snake whom the Paiwan people and the nose flute have a deep history and connection with.

In Traditional Paiwan Society, the Lalingedan (Paiwan nose flute) was associated with social status, and only noble men were allowed to play the instrument. Lalingedan was commonly used in courtship, and rituals such as funerals, harvest festivals, and weddings. Contemporary performances and media representations often associate the sound of the Paiwan nose flute with emotions such as love, longing, and sorrow.

Preservation and Modern interpretation

The preservation of the nose flute in Taiwan is tied to the evolution of the Cultural Heritage Preservation Act (CHPA), originally enacted in 1982. Following a major transformation of the CHPA in 2005, the Taiwanese government intensified efforts to document Indigenous musical traditions. In 2011, the Paiwan nose flute was officially designated as a National Important Traditional Art. This also included the appointment of "Living National Treasures" (人間國寶), most notably the masters Pairang Pavavalung (Hsu Kun-chung) and Gilegilau Paqalius (Xie Shui-neng), who were recognized for their technical mastery and efforts in cultural transmission.

The classification system was further refined in 2018 with the introduction of National Important Traditional Performing Arts (重要傳統表演藝術). This designation launched a new phase of preservation projects to ensure that the techniques and spiritual significance of the nose flute are passed to the next generation of practitioners.

The cultural perception and thematic focus of the nose flute have evolved significantly over time. Historically, prior to 2000, pieces played by nose flute were primarily named by its musicological characteristics such as "a vertical solo flute" and its traditional social functions, such as "song of seduction". Following the turn of the millennium, the repertoire shifted toward more emotive and reflective themes, such as "songs of loneliness," while also showing increased translation efforts that brought Indigenous titles—like "Quljimai", which is an interjection with no specific meaning, to a modern interpretation: "As Joyous as a Blooming Flower".

In the 21st century preservation is characterized by key works such as Sauniaw Tjuveljevelj's "NASI" (2007), the 2011 release "Brothers Who Sing of Love and Longing" (傳唱愛戀的兄弟), and the 2017 project "Minasi" (meaning "breathing out of two nostrils"). These milestones highlight an era of intensified preservation of the Indigenous culture and art in Taiwan.

Relation with Musicking and Listening

The Paiwan nose flute is closely associated with ritual practice, social relationships, and ancestral belief within Paiwan culture. Ethnomusicological studies have described the instrument not only as a musical object, but also as a form of cultural practice embedded in everyday social life. Traditionally, Paiwan nose flutes were used in courtship, weddings, harvest festivals, funerals, and other ceremonial contexts.

The traditional double-pipe nose flute (lalingedan) typically consists of one melodic pipe and one drone pipe. The interaction between melody and drone has been associated with Paiwan vocal aesthetics, particularly the layered texture found in group singing traditions. Some scholars have interpreted the instrument's relatively soft volume and sustained drone as contributing to an intimate and inward-oriented soundscape rather than a public performance style.

Studies on Paiwan musical instruments have also emphasized the relationship between embodiment, ritual practice, and sound production. In some Paiwan communities, nasal breath has been symbolically associated with purity and spiritual communication, contributing to the ritual significance of nose flute performance. Nose flute construction is similarly connected to ancestral belief systems, mountain environments, and symbolic imagery such as the hundred-pacer snake motif.

Since the 1990s, Paiwan nose flute traditions have increasingly been incorporated into Taiwanese cultural heritage preservation projects. Researchers have noted that institutionalization and heritage discourse contributed to the wider public recognition of Paiwan nose flute music while also reshaping its contemporary cultural meanings. In modern contexts, nose flute performance frequently appears in cultural festivals, concert stages, museums, and heritage exhibitions in addition to traditional ritual settings.

== Paiwan people ==
- Calivat Gadu, Deputy Minister of the Council of Indigenous Peoples
- Chen Shih-chieh, weightlifter
- Chien Tung-ming (Uliw Qaljupayare), member of Legislative Yuan
- Giljegiljaw Kungkuan, baseball player
- Lai Chu-en, boxer
- Ahronglong Sakinu, writer
- Ma Chih-hung, luger
- ABAO, singer
- Yang Yung-wei, judoka, Olympic silver medalist
- Cudjuy Patjidres, tattoo artist

== See also ==
- Demographics of Taiwan
- Taiwanese Indigenous peoples
- The Younger Sister Marries the Snake
