= Council of Indigenous Peoples =

Ministry-level body of the Taiwanese government

- 原住民族委員會; Yuánzhù Mínzú Wěiyuánhuì (Mandarin); Ngièn-chhu-mìn-chhu̍k Vî-yèn-fi (Hakka)
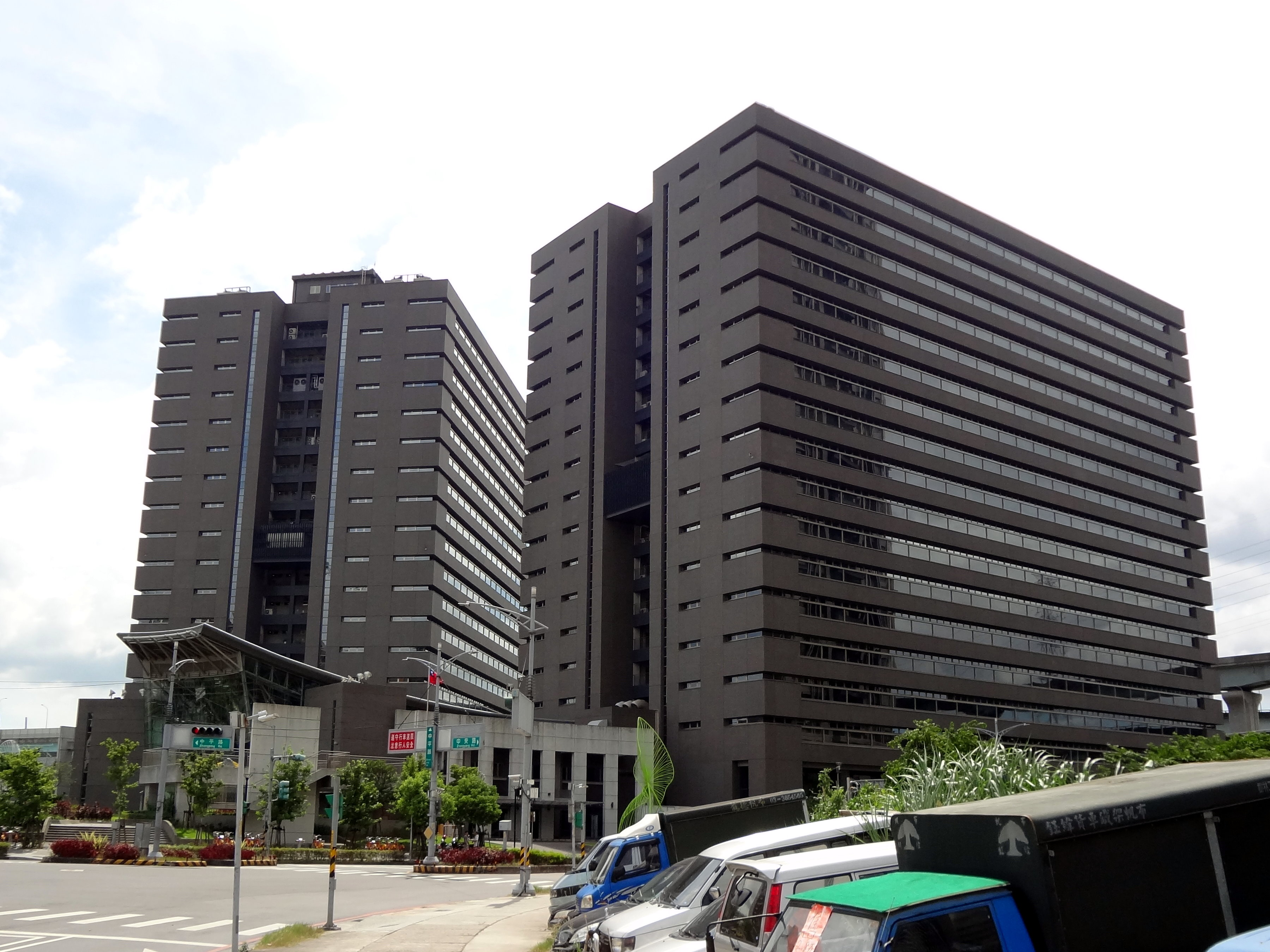

Agency overview
- Formed: 10 December 1996 (as Council of Aboriginal Affairs); 25 March 2002 (as Council of Indigenous Peoples)
- Jurisdiction: Republic of China (Taiwan)
- Headquarters: North Tower, Xinzhuang Joint Office Tower, New Taipei
- Ministers responsible: Ljaucu Zingrur, Minister; Calivat Gadu, Iwan Nawi, Tibusungu 'e Vayayana, Deputy Ministers
- Parent agency: Executive Yuan
- Website: Official website

The Council of Indigenous Peoples (CIP; Chinese: 原住民族委員會; pinyin: Yuánzhù Mínzú Wěiyuánhuì; Pe̍h-ōe-jī: Goân-chū-bîn-cho̍k Úi-oân-hōe), formerly known as the Council of Aboriginal Affairs, is a ministry-level body under the Executive Yuan in Taiwan (Republic of China). It was established to serve the needs of the country's indigenous populations as well as a central interface for the indigenous community with the government.

The CIP promotes the use and revitalization of Taiwan's indigenous languages, supported legislation that would grant autonomous land to indigenous peoples, strengthened relations between Taiwan's indigenous groups and those in other countries and raised awareness of indigenous cultures. Among its responsibilities, it grants recognized status to indigenous peoples of Taiwan.

The CIP has long strong tie with NDHU College of Indigenous Studies, which is largely funded by CIP and serves as think tank of indigenous issues. The council has been criticized by both indigenous and non-indigenous individuals and groups. These criticisms tend to accuse the Council of ineffectiveness, and of discriminating against plains indigenous peoples.

== History ==
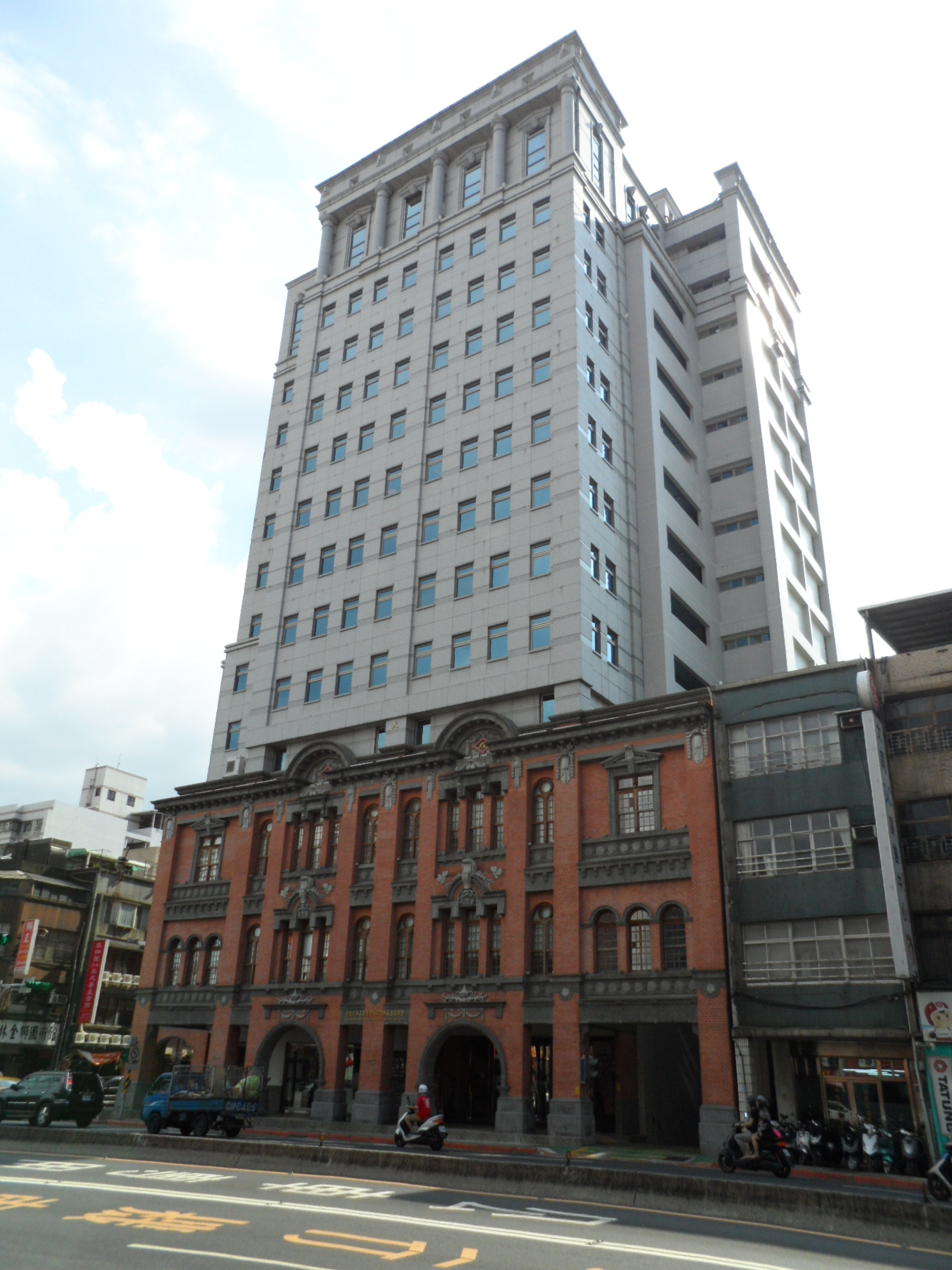
Former location of Council of Indigenous Peoples

The council was originally established on 1 December 1996 as the Council of Aboriginal Affairs. On 1 July 1999, the Aboriginal Affairs Commission of the Taiwan Provincial Government was incorporated into the council. In 2001, CIP established NDHU College of Indigenous Studies through the partnership with National Dong Hwa University, which was Taiwan's 1st indigenous institution in higher education and regarded a great milestone for Taiwan's social movement in indigenous education.

The council also took over the management of the Indigenous Peoples Cultural Park from the commission. On 4 January 2002, the Legislative Yuan approved the amendments to the council and on 25 March in the same year, the council was renamed to Council of Indigenous Peoples.

== Leadership ==
As with all cabinet-level bodies under the Executive Yuan, the Council of Indigenous Peoples is headed by a minister who is recommended by the Premier and appointed by the President.

The first chairman of the Council of Aboriginal Affairs was Hua Chia-chi. He was succeeded in 2000 by Yohani Isqaqavut, a long-time indigenous rights activist, chief of general affairs at the Yushan College of Theology, and Presbyterian missionary. Yohani stepped down in 2002. His successor, Chen Chien-nien, had been Taitung County commissioner from 1993 to 2001, a position in which he became known for his dedication to improving the lives of indigenous peoples.

On 4 February 2005, Chen was indicted for electoral fraud. He was accused of buying votes for his daughter, Chen Ying, in the legislative election held three months prior. Chen denied the accusations, but he nevertheless resigned from his position as chairman. He was replaced by Walis Pelin. In 2007, Icyang Parod became chairman, and he was succeeded by Chang Jen-hsiang the next year. Chang was criticized by both indigenous people and legislators of all ethnicities. Indigenous protesters outside the Council building demanded Chang resign, saying that she had disregarded the land and hunting rights of indigenous peoples. Protesters claimed Chang allowed the Atomic Energy Council to dump nuclear waste near indigenous villages, and that the government would not let the Puyuma people participate in its traditional annual hunt without permission from the Forestry Bureau. Kao Chin Su-mei, an Atayal legislator, criticized Chang at the same time. Chang was later criticized by several other lawmakers, who questioned her effectiveness in her position, as well as her commitment to securing autonomy for indigenous peoples.

Sun Ta-chuan, an academic, became the chairman in 2009. He was succeeded in 2013 by Lin Chiang-yi, formerly the deputy minister of the council.

== Tribal recognition ==
Before the establishment of what was then called the Council of Aboriginal Affairs, there were nine indigenous peoples recognized by the government of Taiwan. These peoples had been classified by Japanese colonial authorities, and the designations were kept by the Taiwan government. In 2001 the Thao was recognized. The next year, Kavalan became the first plains indigenous people to be recognized. The Truku, who had previously been classified as Atayal, was recognized in 2004. This recognition was controversial, however; some Seediq, also classified as Atayal, did not consider the Truku to be distinct from them, and claimed that giving Truku separate status was a political move. In 2007, the Sakizaya, who had been classified as Amis, gained recognition. The Seediq were officially split from the Atayal in 2008. The most recent additions were in 2014, when both the Hla'alua and the Kanakanavu were recognized.

=== Pingpu ===
Among the Pingpu, or plains indigenous peoples, only the Kavalan have been officially recognized by the government. Unlike the "mountain" or "highland" indigenous peoples, Pingpu had been largely assimilated into Han society, and they typically lost official recognition as indigenous after the 1940s. Efforts to gain recognition for Pingpu peoples from the Council of Indigenous Peoples have been largely ineffective. Pingpu activists have called on the Council several times, but every time the council has a reason not to grant them recognition. In 2009, calls for recognition were denied on the ground that law only grant indigenous status to those whose parents were registered as indigenous peoples. The Council later said that plains indigenous peoples should have registered in the 1950s and 1960s and compared modern Pingpu seeking recognition to "the homeless beggar who kicked out the temple administrator," a Taiwanese analogy used to describe someone who attempts to displace something's rightful owner. The Council apologized for making the analogy, but activists refused to accept the apology. In 2010, after more dissatisfaction with the council, Pingpu activist Lin Sheng-yi called on the government to create a new ministry specifically for Pingpu affairs.

== Struggles for autonomy ==
Historically, one of the main goals of the Council of Indigenous Peoples has been securing autonomy for the indigenous peoples. When Yohani Isqaqavut was chairman, he worked towards securing land rights for Taiwan's indigenous people, saying "During my term, I will endeavor to see that indigenous land rights are respected." Despite autonomy being one of the most notable issues among indigenous peoples, many activists feel that the government of Taiwan has not made adequate progress. In 2010, ten years after the completion of the first draft bill on indigenous autonomy, it still had not passed. Sun Ta-chuan, Minister of the Council of Indigenous Peoples, said that a bill would be passed within two years. By September of that year, the Executive Yuan passed a bill, supported by Sun Ta-chuan. However, some indigenous activists were against the bill, claiming that the government did not accept input from indigenous activists when drafting the bill, autonomy would still be dependent on the approval of local governments. In November, activists said that, despite the bill, the Executive Yuan did not care about autonomy, as indigenous townships were to become districts in special municipalities, in which indigenous people would no longer have self-governance.

== Other actions ==
The Council of Indigenous Peoples has supported efforts to protect and revitalize the languages spoken by Taiwanese indigenous peoples. In 2001, the Council commissioned the first proficiency tests for indigenous languages in Taiwan. In 2005, the council established a romanized writing system for all Taiwanese indigenous languages. The annual exam later began to wane in popularity; in 2009, the proficiency test for the Thao, Saaroa, and Tona Rukai languages had no participants, and the passing rate of test-takers dropped five percent from the previous year. In 2013, the Council published an online dictionary of seven indigenous languages: Bunun, Saisiyat, Tsou, Truku, Thao, Kanakanavu, and Tao. The Council consulted with tribal elders, speakers of the languages, and linguists to create the dictionary. The council has recruited speakers of indigenous languages to study the rates of comprehension and use of those languages.

The Council of Indigenous Peoples has promoted international solidarity among indigenous peoples. The Council sponsored trip for a group of Taiwanese indigenous peoples to the 18th session of the UN-sponsored Working Group on Indigenous Populations in 2000. Besides political actions, the council has supported trade, economic cooperation, and cultural exchange with Canada's indigenous peoples and New Zealand's Māori people.

After the enactment of a 2000 law which required the Taiwanese government to either allocate time slots on public television to indigenous culture and education or to create a channel solely devoted to indigenous issues, the council began to push for a channel to be made. In 2005, the channel was finally created, becoming the first such channel in Asia. Indigenous producers criticized the channel, arguing that most of the programs were not produced by indigenous peoples.

The Council produced an anthology of indigenous literature, including poetry, prose, and short stories, and a history of Taiwanese indigenous literature since 1951, and promoted this anthology alongside other indigenous documents, such as historical documents and oral histories. In 2022, the Council implemented a total of 16 indigenous languages in signs and labels at its headquarters office in New Taipei, with bilingual signs in Atayal, Kanakanavu, Sakizaya, Amis, etc. These changes also extended to ID badges, on which members of staff now have the option to include a secondary, indigenous language of choice (or according to one's ethnicity).

In 2025, the council criticized a former Kuomintang legislator for remarks that "indigenous Taiwanese peoples are a Chinese ethnic minority".

== Criticism ==
The council has come under fire for ineffectiveness. In 2002, the Executive Yuan reported that the Council created job service stations in areas with low concentrations of indigenous population, and that the stations were not effective in lowering unemployment. In 2008, indigenous legislators criticized the council for delaying legislative proposals.

In 2010, Jason Pan, director of the Taiwan Association for Rights Advancements for Plains Indigenous Peoples, wrote a letter to the United Nations on behalf of Pingpu rights groups, in which he asked the UN to investigate the refusal of the Taiwanese government, and specifically the Council of Indigenous Peoples, to recognize Pingpu as indigenous peoples.

Young indigenous activists criticized the council for a lack of transparency regarding a cross-strait service pact.

== Organizational structures ==
- Department of Planning
- Department of Education and Culture
- Department of Health and Welfare
- Department of Economic and Public Construction
- Department of Land Management
- Bureau of Culture Park

== Ministers ==
Political Party: Kuomintang Democratic Progressive Party Non-partisan/ unknown Non-Partisan Solidarity Union

No.	Name	Term of Office		Days	Political Party	Ethnicity	Cabinet
1	Tjaravak Kadrangian (華加志)	1 June 1996	20 May 2000	1449	Kuomintang	Paiwan	Lien Chan; Vincent Siew
2	Yohani Isqaqavut (尤哈尼·伊斯卡卡夫特)	20 May 2000	1 February 2002	622	Democratic Progressive Party	Bunun	Tang Fei; Chang Chun-hsiung
3	Adulumau Daliyalrep (陳建年)	1 February 2002	10 March 2005	1133	Independent	Puyuma	Yu Shyi-kun; Frank Hsieh
4	Walis Perin (瓦歷斯·貝林)	10 March 2005	21 May 2007	802	Non-Partisan Solidarity Union	Seediq	Frank Hsieh; Su Tseng-chang I
5	Icyang Parod (夷將·拔路兒)	21 May 2007	20 May 2008	365	Democratic Progressive Party	Amis	Chang Chun-hsiung
6	Chang Jen-hsiang (章仁香)	20 May 2008	10 September 2009	478	Kuomintang	Amis	Liu Chao-shiuan
7	Paelabang Danapan (孫大川)	10 September 2009	31 July 2013	1420	Independent	Puyuma	Wu Den-yih; Sean Chen; Jiang Yi-huah
8	Mayaw Dongi (林江義)	1 August 2013	20 May 2016	1023	Kuomintang	Amis	Jiang Yi-huah; Mao Chi-kuo; Chang San-cheng
(5)	Icyang Parod (夷將·拔路兒)	20 May 2016	20 May 2024	2922	Democratic Progressive Party	Amis	Lin Chuan; William Lai; Su Tseng-chang II; Chen Chien-jen
9	Ljaucu Zingrur (曾智勇)	20 May 2024	Incumbent	872	Democratic Progressive Party	Paiwan	Cho Jung-tai

== Access ==
The council building is accessible by Xinzhuang Fuduxin MRT station of the Airport MRT.

== See also ==
- Executive Yuan
- Taiwanese indigenous peoples

== Important News Articles ==
ROC Constitutional Court paves way for Siraya recognition
