= Paiwan language =

Austronesian language spoken in Taiwan

Paiwan
- Vinuculjan, Pinayuanan
- Pronunciation: [vinutsuʎan]
- Native to: Taiwan
- Ethnicity: Paiwan
- Native speakers: L1:96,000 (2014)
- Language family: Austronesian: Paiwan
- Writing system: Latin (Paiwan alphabet)

Official status
- Official language in: Taiwan

Language codes
- ISO 639-3: pwn
- Glottolog: paiw1248
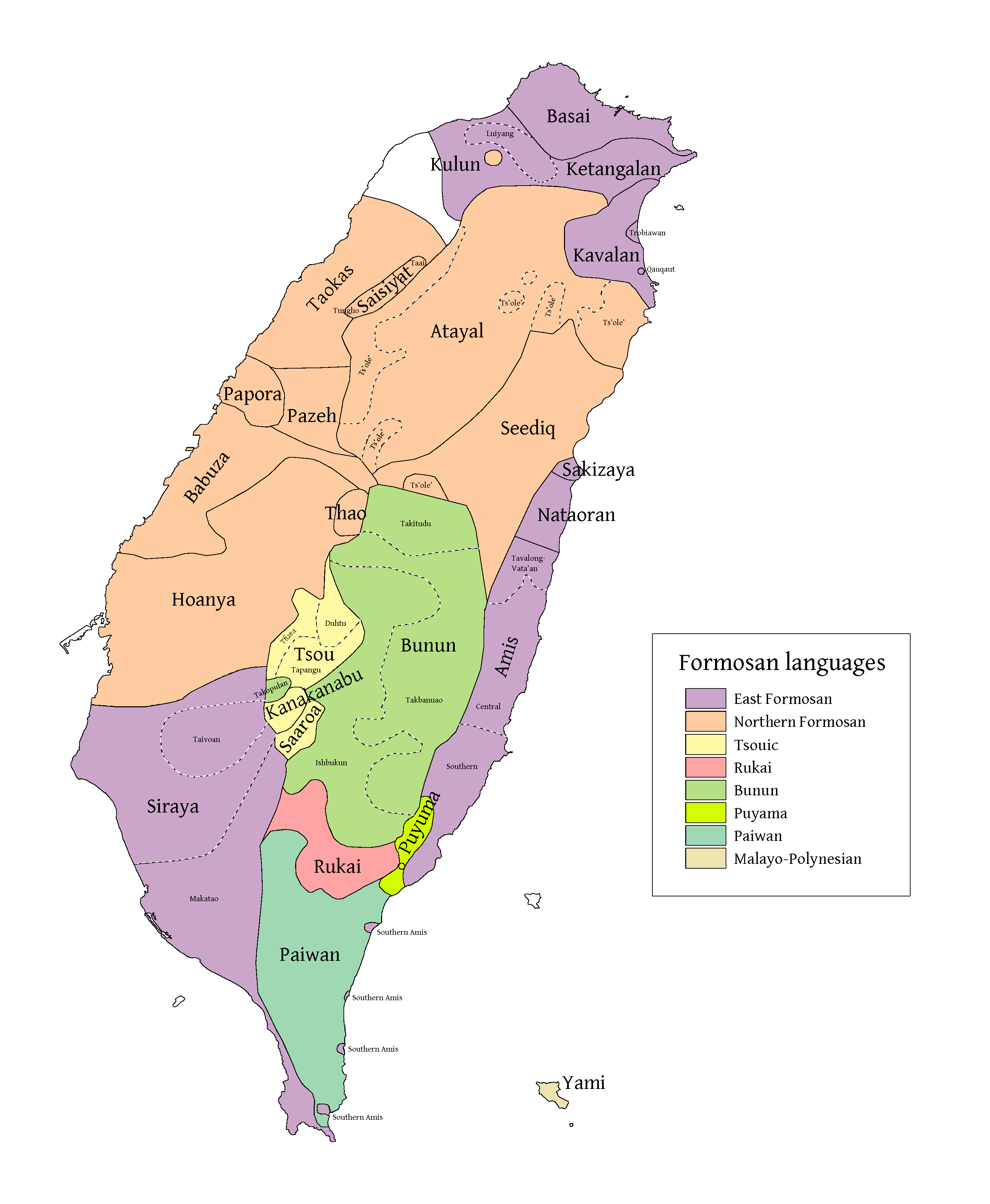
- Distribution of Paiwan language (dark green, south)

- Paiwan is classified as Vulnerable by the UNESCO Atlas of the World's Languages in Danger

Paiwan (Paiwan: Vinuculjan, [vinutsuʎan]) is a native language of southern Taiwan. It is spoken as a first language by the ethnic Paiwan, a Taiwanese indigenous people, and historically as a second language by most people in southern Taiwan. Paiwan is a Formosan language of the Austronesian language family. It is also one of the national languages of Taiwan.

== Dialects ==
Although there aren't any solid dialects, many people have made guesses on what they think are the dialects. Paiwan variants are seen divided into the following dialect zones by Ferrell.

- A1 – southern and central
  - Kuɬaɬau (Kulalao) _ used in Ferrell's 1982 Paiwan Dictionary due to its widespread intelligibility and preservation of various phonemic distinctions; also spoken in Tjuabar Village, Taitung County, where Tjariḍik and "Tjuabar" (closely related to Tjavuaɬi) are also spoken.
  - Kapaiwanan (Su-Paiwan)
  - Tjuaqatsiɬay (Kachirai) – southernmost dialect
- A2 – central
  - Ɬarəkrək (Riki-riki)
  - Patjavaɬ (Ta-niao-wan)
- B1 – northernmost
  - Tjukuvuɬ (Tokubun)
  - Kaviangan (Kapiyan)
- B2 – northwestern
  - Tjaɬakavus (Chalaabus, Lai-yi)
  - Makazayazaya (Ma-chia)
- B3 – east-central
  - Tjariḍik (Charilik)
- B4 – eastern
  - Tjavuaɬi (Taimali)
  - Tjakuvukuvuɬ (Naibon, Chaoboobol)

This classification were thought to be corrected by Cheng 2016 as below:

Note: A village unnoted of Vuculj/Ravar is by default placed under Vuculj here.

- Paridrayan group (Ravar)
  - Paridrayan /pariɖajan/
  - Tjailjaking
  - Tineljepan
  - Cavak
  - Tjukuvulj
- Timur group
  - Timur
  - Tavatavang
  - Vuljulju
  - Sagaran (Ravar-Vuculj mixture)
- Makazayazaya branch
  - ʼulaljuc
  - Idra
  - Masilidj
  - Makazayazaya
  - Paljulj
  - Kazangiljan
  - Masisi
  - Kazazaljan
  - ʼapedang
  - Kaviyangan
  - Puljetji
  - Tjuaqau
- Eastern branch
  - Paumeli
  - Tjulitjulik
  - Viljauljaulj
  - Kaljataran
  - Kaʼaluan
  - Tjuaʼau
  - Sapulju
  - Kingku
  - Djumulj
  - Tjukuvulj
- Tjagaraus branch
  - Payuan
  - Padain
  - Piuma
- Raxekerek branch (west)
  - Raxekerek
  - Kinaximan
  - Tjevecekadan
- Raxekerek branch (east)
  - Tjahiljik
  - Tjacuqu
  - Tjatjigelj
  - Tjaqup
  - Rahepaq
  - Kaljapitj
  - Qeceljing
  - Pacavalj
  - Kuvaxeng
  - Utjaqas
  - Ljupetj
- Tjalaʼavus branch
  - Tjaljaʼavus
  - Calasiv
  - Tjanaʼasia
  - Pucunug
  - Vungalid
  - Pailjus

== Phonology ==
Kuljaljau Paiwan has 23–24 consonants (/h/ is found only in loanwords, and /ʔ/ is uncommon) and 4 vowels. Unlike many other Formosan languages that have merged many Proto-Austronesian phonemes, Paiwan preserves most Proto-Austronesian phonemes and is thus highly important for reconstruction purposes.

Paiwan Vowels
	Front	Central	Back
Close	i		u
Mid		ə ⟨e⟩	
Open		a	

Kuljaljau (Kuɬaɬau) Paiwan consonants
		Labial	Alveolar	Retroflex	Palatal	Velar	Uvular	Glottal
Nasal		m	n			ŋ		
Plosive	voiceless	p	t		c	k	q	ʔ
Plosive	voiced	b	d	ɖ	ɟ	ɡ		
Affricate			ts					
Fricative	voiceless		s					(h)
Fricative	voiced	v	z					
Trill			r					
Approximant		w	l		ʎ j			

Central Paiwan consonants
		Labial	Alveolar	Retroflex	Palatal	Velar	Uvular	Glottal
Nasal		m	n			ŋ ⟨ng⟩		
Plosive	voiceless	p	t		c ⟨tj⟩	k	q ⟨q⟩	ʔ ⟨ʼ⟩
Plosive	voiced	b	d	ɖ ⟨dr⟩	ɟ ⟨dj⟩	ɡ		
Affricate			ts ~ tʃ ⟨c⟩					
Fricative	voiceless		s					(h)
Fricative	voiced	v	z					
Rhotic			r ~ ɣ ⟨r⟩					
Approximant		ʋ ⟨w⟩		ɭ ⟨l⟩	ʎ ⟨lj, ɬ⟩ j ⟨y⟩			

Northern Paiwan (Sandimen) consonants
		Labial	Alveolar	Retroflex	Palatal	Velar	Glottal
Nasal		m	n			ŋ	
Plosive	voiceless	p	t			k	ʔ
Plosive	voiced	b	d	ɖ		ɡ	
Affricate			ts				
Fricative	voiceless		s				(h)
Fricative	voiced	v	z				
Trill~ Fricative			r				
Approximant		w	l ~ ʎ	ɭ	j		

In Northern Paiwan the palatal consonants have been lost, though this is recent and a few conservative speakers maintain them as allophonic variants (not as distinct phonemes). /ʔ/ is robust, unlike in other Paiwan dialects where its status is uncertain, as it derives from *q.

Southern Paiwan (Mudan) consonants
		Labial	Alveolar	Retroflex	Palatal	Velar	Uvular	Glottal
Nasal		m	n			ŋ		
Plosive	voiceless	p	t		c	k	q	ʔ
Plosive	voiced	b	d	ɖ	ɟ	ɡ		
Affricate			ts					
Fricative	voiceless		s					(h)
Fricative	voiced	v	z			ɣ ~ r		
Approximant		w		ɭ	ʎ j			

Younger speakers tend to pronounce /ʎ/ as [l]. Fricative [ɣ] is characteristic of Mudan village; elsewhere in Southern Paiwan it tends to be a trill [r], though it still varies [r ~ ɣ ~ ʁ ~ h]. Word-initial *k has become /ʔ/.

== Grammar ==
=== Pronouns ===
The Paiwan personal pronouns below are from Ferrell (1982).

Paiwan Personal Pronouns
Gloss	Equational	Genitive	Non-Eq., Non-Gen.
1SG	-aken, ti-aken	ku-, ni-aken	tjanu-aken
2SG	-sun, ti-sun	su-, ni-sun	tjanu-sun
3SG	ti-madju	ni-madju	tjai-madju
1PL.INCL	-itjen, ti-tjen	tja-, ni-tjen	tjanu-itjen
1PL.EXCL	-amen, ti-amen	nia-, ni-amen	tjanu-amen
2PL	-mun, ti-mun	nu-, ni-mun	tjanu-mun
3PL	ti-a-madju	ni-a-madju	tjai-a-madju

=== Function words ===
Paiwan has three construction markers, which are also known as relational particles.

1. a – shows equational relationship; personal sing. = ti, personal plural = tia
2. nua – shows genitive / partitive relationship; personal sing. = ni, personal plural = nia
3. tua – shows that the relationship is neither equational nor genitive; personal sing. = *tjai, personal plural = tjaia

Other words include:

- i – be at, in (place)
- nu – if when
- na – already (definitely) done/doing or have become
- uri – definite future negative marker
- uri – definite future marker
- ɬa – emphasis, setting apart

Affixed adverbials include:

- -tiaw
  - nu-tiaw: tomorrow
  - ka-tiaw: yesterday
- -sawni
  - nu-sawni: soon, in a little while (future)
  - ka-sawni: a little while ago
- -ngida
  - nu-ngida: when? (future)
  - ka-ngida: when? (past)

Interjections include the following:

- ui – yes
- ini – no (not do)
- neka – no, not (not exist)
- ai – oh! (surprise, wonder)
- ai ḍivá – alas!
- uá – oh! (surprise, taken aback)
- ai ḍaḍá – ouch! (pain)

=== Verbs ===
Paiwan verbs have 4 types of focus.

1. Agent/Actor
2. Object/Goal/Patient
3. Referent: spatial/temporal locus, indirect object, beneficiary
4. Instrument/Cause/Motivation/Origin

The following verbal affixes are used to express varying degrees of volition or intent, and are arranged below from highest to lowest intention.

1. ki- (intentional)
2. pa- (intentional)
3. -m- (volitionally ambiguous)
4. si- (volitionally ambiguous)
5. ma- (non-intentional)
6. se- (non-intentional)

Paiwan verbs can also take on the following non-derivational suffixes.

- -anga: "certainly," "truly doing"
- -angata: "definitely" (emphatic)
- -anga: "still, yet, continuing to"

== Affixes ==
The Paiwan affixes below are from the Kulalao dialect unless stated otherwise, and are sourced from Ferrell (1982).

Prefixes

- ka-: used as an inchoative marker with some stems; past marker
- ka- -an: principal, main
- kaɬa- -an: time/place characterized by something
- ma-ka-: go past, via; having finished
- pa-ka-: go/cause to go by way of (something/place)
- ka-si-: come from
- ken(e)-: eat, drink, consume
- ki-: get, obtain
- ku-: my; I (as agent of non-agent focus verb)
- ɬa-: belonging to a given [plant/animal] category
- ɬe-: to go in the direction of
- ɬia-: (have) come to be in/at
- li-: have quality of
- ma-: be affected by, be in condition of (involuntary)
- mare-: having reciprocal relationship
- mare-ka-: in some general category
- maɬe-: number of persons
- me-: agent marker usually involving change of status (used with certain verbs)
- mere-: be gigantic, super-
- mi-: agent marker that is usually intransitive (used with certain verbs)
- mi- -an: pretend, claim
- mu-: agent marker (certain verbs)
- ka-na- -anga: every
- pa-: to cause to be/occur
- pe-: emerge, come into view
- pi-: put in/on; do something to
- pu-: have or produce; acquire
- pu- -an: place where something is put or kept
- ma-pu-: do nothing except ...
- ra-: having to do with
- r-m-a-: do at/during
- r-m-a- -an: do at/in
- sa-: wish to; go to, in direction of; have odor, quality, flavor of
- pa-sa-: transfer something to; nearly, be on point of doing
- ki-sa-: use, utilize, employ
- na-sa-: perhaps, most likely is
- san(e)-: construct, work on/in
- ki-sane(e)-: become/act as; one who acts as
- ru-: do frequently/habitually; have many of
- se-: people of (village/nation); have quality of; occur suddenly/unexpectedly/unintentionally
- s-ar-e-: be in state/condition of (involuntary)
- si-: be instrument/cause/beneficiary of; instrument focus marker; belonging to certain time in past
- ma-si-: carry, transport
- su-: your; you (agent of non-agent focus verb); leave, remove, desist from
- ki-su-: remove or have removed from oneself
- ta-: past marker
- tu-: similar to, like
- ma-ru-: be dissimilar but of same size
- tja-: our, we (inclusive); more, to a greater extent, further
- ki-tja-: take along for use
- tjaɬa- -an: most, -est
- tjara-: be definitely
- tjaɬu-: reach/extend as far as
- tjari-: furthest, utmost
- tja-u-: to have just done
- tje-: choose to do at/from
- ka-tje- -an: containing
- tji-: used mainly in plant/animal species names (non-Kulalao frozen affix)
- tji-a-: be/remain at
- tju-: do/use separately; be/do at certain place
- m-uri-: search for

Infixes

- -aɬ-, -al-, -ar-: having sound or quality of; involving use of; non-Kulalao
- -ar-: do indiscriminately, on all sides; non-Kulalao
- -m-: agent or actor; -n- following /p/, /b/, /v/, /m/; m- before vowel-initial words
- -in-: perfective marker, action already begun or accomplished, object or product of past action; in- before vowel-initial words

Suffixes

- -an: specific location in time/space; specific one/type; referent focus
- -en: object/goal of action; object focus
- -aw, -ay: projected or intended action, referent focus
- -u: agent focus (most subordinate clauses); most peremptory imperative
- -i: object focus (most subordinate clauses); polite imperative
- -ɬ: things in sequence; groupings; durations of time

The following affixes are from the Tjuabar dialect of Paiwan, spoken in the northwest areas of Paiwan-occupied territory (Comparative Austronesian Dictionary 1995).

Nouns

- -aḷ-, -alʸ- 'tiny things'
- -in- 'things made from plant roots'
- -an 'place' (always used with another affix)
- mar(ə)- 'a pair of' (used for humans only)
- pu- 'rich'
- ḳay- 'vegetation'
- sə- 'inhabitants'
- cua- 'name of a tribe'

Verbs

- -aŋa 'already done'
- ka- 'to complete'
- kə- 'to do something oneself'
- ki- 'to do something to oneself'
- kisu- 'to get rid of'
- kicu- 'to do something separately'
- maCa- 'to do something reciprocally' (where C indicates the initial consonant of the stem)
- mə- 'to experience, to be something'
- pa- 'to cause someone to do something'
- pu- 'to produce, to get something'
- sa- 'to be willing to do something'
- calʸu- 'to arrive at'

Adjectives

- ma- 'being'
- na- 'with the quality of'
- səcalʸi- 'very'
- ca- 'more than'
