= List of elections in 1977 =

The following elections occurred in the year 1977.

== Africa ==
- 1977 Afars and Issas Constituent Assembly election
- 1977 Algerian legislative election
- 1977 Gambian general election
- 1976–1977 Guinea-Bissau legislative election
- 1977 Malagasy parliamentary election
- 1977 Moroccan parliamentary election
- 1977 Mozambican general election
- 1977 Rhodesian general election
- 1977 Sierra Leonean parliamentary election
- 1977 South African general election
- 1977 Sudanese presidential election
- 1977 Zairean parliamentary election
- 1977 Zairean presidential election

== Asia ==
- 1977 Afghan Constitutional Assembly election
- 1977 Cypriot presidential election
- 1977 Indonesian legislative election
- 1977 Israeli legislative election
- 1977 Japanese House of Councillors election
- 1977 Mongolian parliamentary election
- 1977 North Korean local elections
- 1977 North Korean parliamentary election
- 1977 Pakistani general election
- 1977 Singaporean by-elections
- 1977 Sri Lankan parliamentary election
- 1977 Syrian parliamentary election
- 1977 Taiwanese local elections
- 1977 Turkish local elections

=== India ===
- 1977 Indian general election
- 1977 Indian general election in Andhra Pradesh
- 1977 Indian general election in Tamil Nadu
- 1977 Indian presidential election
- 1977 Tamil Nadu Legislative Assembly election

=== Turkey ===
- 1977 Turkish general election
- 1977 Turkish local elections

== Australia ==
- 1977 Australian federal election
- 1977 Cunningham by-election
- 1977 Northern Territory general election
- 1977 Queensland state election
- 1977 Australian referendum
- 1977 South Australian state election
- 1977 Western Australian state election

== Europe ==
- 1977 Andorran parliamentary election
- 1977 Belgian general election
- 1977 Danish parliamentary election
- 1977 Dutch general election
- 1977 Greek legislative election
- 1977 Irish general election
- 1977 Norwegian parliamentary election
- 1977 Romanian local elections
- 1977 Turkish general election
- 1977 Turkish local elections

=== France ===
- 1977 French municipal elections

=== Spain ===
- 1977 Spanish general election

=== Turkey ===
- 1977 Turkish general election
- 1977 Turkish local elections

== North America ==
- 1977 Bahamian general election
- 1977 Salvadoran presidential election

=== Canada ===
- 1977 Edmonton municipal election
- 1977 Manitoba general election
- 1977 Manitoba municipal elections
- 1977 Ontario general election

=== United States ===
==== United States lieutenant gubernatorial ====
- 1977 Virginia lieutenant gubernatorial election

==== United States gubernatorial ====
- 1977 New Jersey gubernatorial election
- 1977 United States gubernatorial elections
- 1977 Virginia gubernatorial election

==== United States House of Representatives ====
- 1977 United States House of Representatives elections
- 1977 Georgia's 5th congressional district special election
- 1977 Louisiana's 1st congressional district special election
- 1977 Washington's 7th congressional district special election

==== United States mayoral elections ====
- 1977 Allentown mayoral election
- 1977 Atlanta mayoral election
- 1977 Buffalo mayoral election
- 1977 Chicago mayoral special election
- 1977 Cleveland mayoral election
- 1977 Los Angeles mayoral election
- 1977 Manchester, New Hampshire, mayoral election
- 1977 Miami mayoral election
- 1977 New Orleans mayoral election
- 1977 New York City mayoral election
- 1977 Springfield, Massachusetts mayoral election
- 1977 St. Louis mayoral election

== Oceania ==
- March 1977 Fijian general election
- September 1977 Fijian general election
- 1977 Nauruan parliamentary election
- 1977 Papua New Guinean general election
- 1977 Tuvaluan general election

=== Australia ===
- 1977 Australian federal election
- 1977 Cunningham by-election
- 1977 Northern Territory general election
- 1977 Queensland state election
- 1977 Australian referendum
- 1977 South Australian state election
- 1977 Western Australian state election

== South America ==
=== Falkland Islands ===
- 1977 Falkland Islands general election

=== Paraguay ===
- 1977 Paraguayan Constitutional Assembly election

=== Suriname ===
- 1977 Surinamese general election
