= Pazeh =

Pazeh may refer to:

- Pazeh people
- Pazeh language
