= Saisiyat =

Saisiyat may refer to:

- Saisiyat people, of Taiwan
- Saisiyat language, their Austronesian language
