= Indigenous Area =

Indigenous Area may refer to:

- Indigenous Area (Taiwan), administrative divisions in Taiwan with significant populations of indigenous peoples
- Indigenous and Community Conserved Area (ICCA), as defined by United Nations Environment Programme World Conservation Monitoring Centre
- Indigenous Protected Area, a class of protected area used in Australia
