= Pan Jin-yu =

Last speaker of the Pazeh language

- Born: 21 July 1914; Sukan daudun, Puli, Nantou, Taiwan
- Died: 24 October 2010 (aged 96); Puli Christian Hospital, Puli, Nantou, Taiwan
- Education: Nursing school
- Height: 156 cm (5.12 ft)

Pan Jin-yu (Chinese: 潘金玉; pinyin: Pān Jīnyù, 21 July 1914 – 24 October 2010) was the last remaining speaker of the Pazeh language of Taiwan. She was born the fifth of six children in 1914 to Kaxabu parents in Puli. Later, she was adopted by parents who were Pazeh speakers living in Auran village (Taiwanese: Ailan), which is now part of Puli township. She was said to be fully fluent in the language, despite being the only remaining speaker. However, Taiwanese Hokkien was the living language she spoke generally. She taught Pazeh classes to about 200 regular students in Puli, and there were also classes with fewer students in Miaoli and Taichung.
