= 1977 Taiwanese local elections =

Elections

← 1973	19 November 1977	1981 →

All 20 mayors/magistrates of cities, counties
- Turnout: 80.39%
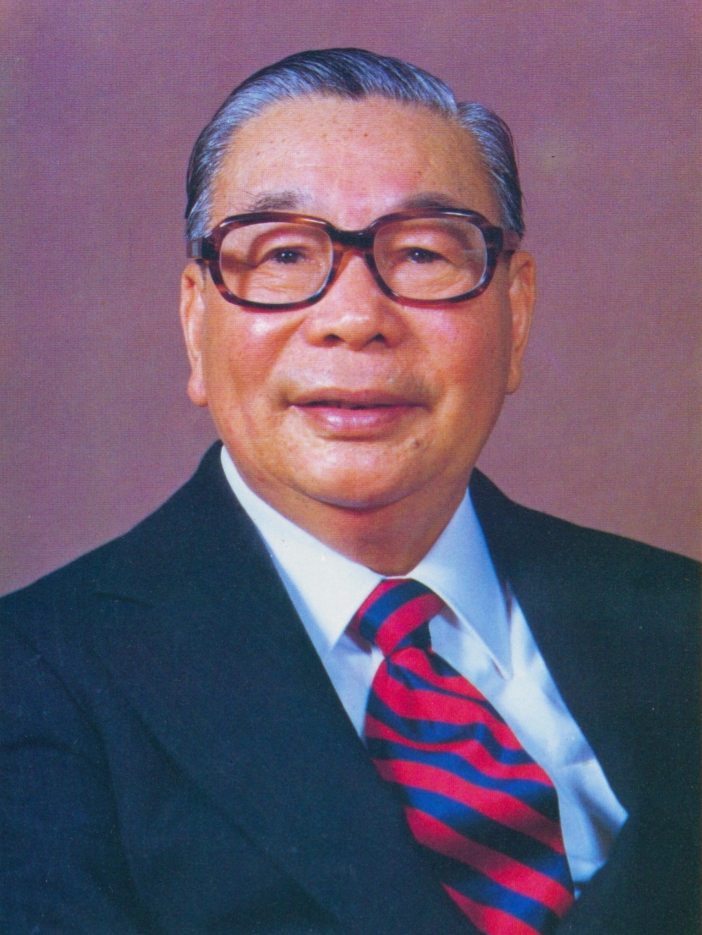
	Majority party	Minority party
Leader	Chiang Ching-kuo	None
Party	Kuomintang	Independent
Popular vote	4,150,460	1,742,124
Percentage	70.44%	29.56%
Mayors/ Magistrates	15	4
- Kuomintang; Independents; Not up for election (Taipei)

Local elections were held in Taiwan on 19 November 1977, electing 20 magistrates and mayors in the country, 77 members of the Taiwan Provincial Council, and members of the Taipei and Kaohsiung City Council.

Seen as one of the most competitive local polls with crowded field of candidates, the ruling Kuomintang (KMT) was especially focusing on the bitter races in Tainan City, and the counties of Kaohsiung, Nantou, and Taoyuan.

The Kuomintang was accused of rigging the election in Taoyuan after the popular opposition was poised to fend off challenge by KMT's candidate, provoking widespread anger in the county and led to the crackdown on protest, later known as the Zhongli incident.

== Provincial election ==
Party	Votes	%	Seats
Kuomintang			56
Independents			21
Total			77
Valid votes	5,939,038	95.80	
Invalid/blank votes	260,180	4.20	
Total votes	6,199,218	100.00	
Registered voters/turnout	7,713,736	80.37	

	KMT	Ind	Turnout (%)
Taipei County	5	2	76.50
Yilan County	1	1	78.13
Taoyuan County	4	1	84.23
Hsinchu County	2	1	82.96
Miaoli County	2	1	78.44
Taichung County	3	2	85.62
Changhua County	4	1	83.42
Nantou County	2	1	79.15
Yunlin County	3	2	75.53
Chiayi County	4	1	75.77
Tainan County	4	1	79.23
Kaohsiung County	4	1	82.47
Pingtung County	3	1	81.72
Taitung County	1		77.27
Hualien County	1		77.46
Penghu County	1		79.04
Keelung City	1		77.12
Taichung City	2	1	81.55
Tainan City	2	1	85.56
Kaohsiung City	3	2	80.94
Plains Indigenous (North)	1		77.39
Plains Indigenous (South)	1		74.40
Mountain Indigenous	2		92.12

== Mayoral and magisterial elections ==
=== Taipei ===
Magistrate of Taipei
Candidate	Party	Votes	%
邵恩新	Kuomintang	519,099	74.76
廖銘義	Independent	90,491	13.03
李歸坵	Independent	68,711	9.90
盧霖	Independent	16,023	2.31
Total		694,324	100.00
Valid votes		694,324	96.33
Invalid/blank votes		26,431	3.67
Total votes		720,755	100.00
Registered voters/turnout		944,438	76.32

=== Keelung ===
Mayor of Keelung
Candidate	Party	Votes	%
陳正雄	Kuomintang	77,172	56.74
張金鐘	Independent	54,742	40.25
陳榮強	Independent	4,097	3.01
Total		136,011	100.00
Valid votes		136,011	96.85
Invalid/blank votes		4,427	3.15
Total votes		140,438	100.00
Registered voters/turnout		182,416	76.99

=== Yilan ===
Magistrate of Yilan
Candidate	Party	Votes	%
李鳳鳴	Kuomintang	151,935	86.61
許仁修	Independent	23,496	13.39
Total		175,431	100.00
Valid votes		175,431	96.67
Invalid/blank votes		6,048	3.33
Total votes		181,479	100.00
Registered voters/turnout		221,597	81.90

=== Taoyuan ===
Provincial Councillor Hsu Hsin-liang expressed interest in Taoyuan poll, but was not nominated by the ruling Kuomintang for being critical of the government. Instead the party nominated 歐憲瑜, an official in the Ministry of Judicial Administration. Hsu nevertheless entered the race, and was subsequently expelled from the party a month before voting.

On the voting day, some ballot papers in Zhongli city were damaged by the poll workers. Voters reported to the police but was largely ignored. Worse still, the police escorted the officials. The furious public soon marched to the police station and demanded a recount. The confrontation, later known as Zhongli Incident, resulted in two deaths after being hit by police's bullet and teargas. It was regarded as the first mass demonstration against election manipulation by the authoritarian regime. Hsu was elected with a majority of around 90,000 votes.

Magistrate of Taoyuan
Candidate	Party	Votes	%
Hsu Hsin-liang	Independent	235,946	61.48
歐憲瑜	Kuomintang	147,851	38.52
Total		383,797	100.00
Valid votes		383,797	97.23
Invalid/blank votes		10,915	2.77
Total votes		394,712	100.00
Registered voters/turnout		468,950	84.17

=== Hsinchu ===
Magistrate of Hsinchu
Candidate	Party	Votes	%
林保仁	Kuomintang	243,458	100.00
Total		243,458	100.00
Valid votes		243,458	86.99
Invalid/blank votes		36,425	13.01
Total votes		279,883	100.00
Registered voters/turnout		338,616	82.65

=== Miaoli ===
Magistrate of Miaoli
Candidate	Party	Votes	%
邱文光	Kuomintang	150,224	69.25
張榮顯	Independent	66,706	30.75
Total		216,930	100.00
Valid votes		216,930	95.81
Invalid/blank votes		9,484	4.19
Total votes		226,414	100.00
Registered voters/turnout		288,745	78.41

=== Taichung ===
Magistrate of Taichung
Candidate	Party	Votes	%
陳孟鈴	Kuomintang	242,740	64.32
楊順隆	Independent	134,640	35.68
Total		377,380	100.00
Valid votes		377,380	92.56
Invalid/blank votes		30,329	7.44
Total votes		407,709	100.00
Registered voters/turnout		476,224	85.61

Chen Tuan-tang, Kuomintang's incumbent Taichung Mayor, faced increasing attack over the bribery and financial mismanagement scandal of the city's government. The local "Chang faction" was also angered by Chen's decision to grant bus franchises, effectively ending the monopoly of transportation. Despite the local resistance, KMT chose Chen for re-election instead of the candidate from another powerful local tribe of Lai.

For the Tangwai bloc, City Councillor Tzeng Wen-po (曾文坡) was selected after his rival gave way and ran for Provincial Councillor instead.

Tzeng eventually won the election by surprise, with a mere 1,100 votes. The disappointment by the local factions was considered to be the major reason. However, there were accusations of fraud as Tzeng's campaign first anticipated a lead of 10,000 votes, and that the officials delayed the counting of several ballot boxes until Tangwai supporters blocked the city office and the outbreak of Zhongli Incident.

Mayor of Taichung
Candidate	Party	Votes	%
Tzeng Wen-po	Independent	119,613	50.22
陳端堂	Kuomintang	118,571	49.78
Total		238,184	100.00
Valid votes		238,184	96.72
Invalid/blank votes		8,090	3.28
Total votes		246,274	100.00
Registered voters/turnout		320,065	76.94

=== Changhua ===
Magistrate of Changhua
Candidate	Party	Votes	%
吳榮興	Kuomintang	308,333	65.25
張春男	Independent	164,226	34.75
Total		472,559	100.00
Valid votes		472,559	94.89
Invalid/blank votes		25,471	5.11
Total votes		498,030	100.00
Registered voters/turnout		597,260	83.39

=== Nantou ===
Magistrate of Nantou
Candidate	Party	Votes	%
劉裕猷	Kuomintang	207,655	100.00
Total		207,655	100.00
Valid votes		207,655	94.27
Invalid/blank votes		12,626	5.73
Total votes		220,281	100.00
Registered voters/turnout		277,596	79.35

=== Yunlin ===
Magistrate of Yunlin
Candidate	Party	Votes	%
林恒生	Kuomintang	173,687	56.97
黃蔴	Independent	131,163	43.03
Total		304,850	100.00
Valid votes		304,850	94.90
Invalid/blank votes		16,384	5.10
Total votes		321,234	100.00
Registered voters/turnout		425,489	75.50

=== Chiayi ===
Magistrate of Chiayi
Candidate	Party	Votes	%
涂德錡	Kuomintang	221,774	67.99
謝明陽	Independent	104,393	32.01
Total		326,167	100.00
Valid votes		326,167	95.28
Invalid/blank votes		16,162	4.72
Total votes		342,329	100.00
Registered voters/turnout		451,627	75.80

=== Tainan ===
A total of 13 hopefuls battled for Kuomintang's nomination, the most across the country, which included Yang Pao-fa (楊寶發), a minister in Taipei City administration and Lee Ya-chiao (李雅樵), the Provincial Councillor with the backing of local camps. Although Lee earned more popularity in the grassroots, Yang, a young and loyal party agent, was nominated by the party.

While rumours said Lee and others might try to sabotage Yang's anticipated walkover, he was the only official candidate in the election. With the support from the "mountain faction" and the acquiescence from the "sea faction", Yang faced no significant obstacles and was elected in the unopposed race.

Magistrate of Tainan
Candidate	Party	Votes	%
Yang Pao-fa	Kuomintang	386,738	100.00
Total		386,738	100.00
Valid votes		386,738	93.46
Invalid/blank votes		27,055	6.54
Total votes		413,793	100.00
Registered voters/turnout		522,682	79.17

Chang Li-tang (張麗堂) secured the party's nomination to run for re-election as Tainan Mayor, while the Tangwai was represented by Su Nan-cheng, stagging a re-run of the last election.

Su was also supported by 蔡介雄, a Provincial Councillor who was no longer acquiesced his campaign for another term by the party because of his strong stance on social issues and as a tactic to split the opposition's vote. Branded "democracy fighter", 蔡介雄 ran for re-election and backed Su in mayoral election. The two rallied for government-friendly and anti-KMT's support respectively.

During the canvassing, KMT's local branch denounced Su as a separatist and communist, which was rebuked by the leading candidate and strengthened the anti-government sentiments. The one-party authorities also called on the soldier to vote for party's candidate.

Chang's team believed the victory is secured, but as vote counting progressed, the lead by Su became clearer. However sudden blackouts were reported in a dozen of voting booths with counting slowed down, a common practice for rigging the election. With the growing fury by the public, the power supply and vote counting later resumed, and Su's advantageous position was maintained. Su later said he resolutely demanded the authorities to abide the law and continue the vote counting, or face whatever consequences that may happen.

Mayor of Tainan
Candidate	Party	Votes	%
Su Nan-cheng	Independent	131,504	53.65
Chang Li-tang	Kuomintang	113,627	46.35
Total		245,131	100.00
Valid votes		245,131	97.63
Invalid/blank votes		5,940	2.37
Total votes		251,071	100.00
Registered voters/turnout		293,476	85.55

=== Kaohsiung ===
Early results showed the election was too close to call with the independent 黃友仁 leading with around 4,000 votes only. As Kuomintang stronghold started counting the ballots, the Tangwai believed the defeat is imminent. Still, supporters of the opposition travelled to the stronghold to supervise the vote count to avoid any electoral fraud. At the end 黃友仁 beat Kuomintang with less than 2,000 votes, which prominent opposition figure Yu Teng-fa said the supervising was critical as it prevented the authorities from stuffing KMT's ballots. Yu also believed the majority should be much larger, at 60,000-some votes.

Magistrate of Kaohsiung
Candidate	Party	Votes	%
黃友仁	Independent	204,782	50.33
王正和	Kuomintang	202,116	49.67
Total		406,898	100.00
Valid votes		406,898	96.38
Invalid/blank votes		15,277	3.62
Total votes		422,175	100.00
Registered voters/turnout		511,905	82.47

In the city of Kaohsiung, the incumbent 王玉雲 had his majority shrunk from more than ten thousand to around 4,000, most of those are from the strongholds such as relatives of soldier and civil servants.

Mayor of Kaohsiung
Candidate	Party	Votes	%
王玉雲	Kuomintang	236,984	55.30
洪照男	Independent	191,591	44.70
Total		428,575	100.00
Valid votes		428,575	97.16
Invalid/blank votes		12,534	2.84
Total votes		441,109	100.00
Registered voters/turnout		545,555	80.86

=== Pingtung ===
Magistrate of Pingtung
Candidate	Party	Votes	%
柯文福	Kuomintang	354,231	100.00
Total		354,231	100.00
Valid votes		354,231	92.84
Invalid/blank votes		27,337	7.16
Total votes		381,568	100.00
Registered voters/turnout		464,382	82.17

=== Taitung ===
Magistrate of Taitung
Candidate	Party	Votes	%
Chiang Sheng-ai	Kuomintang	107,865	100.00
Total		107,865	100.00
Valid votes		107,865	95.27
Invalid/blank votes		5,355	4.73
Total votes		113,220	100.00
Registered voters/turnout		145,296	77.92

=== Hualian ===
Magistrate of Hualian
Candidate	Party	Votes	%
吳水雲	Kuomintang	143,353	100.00
Total		143,353	100.00
Valid votes		143,353	96.39
Invalid/blank votes		5,374	3.61
Total votes		148,727	100.00
Registered voters/turnout		187,969	79.12

=== Penghu ===
Kuomintang Central Committee nominated 謝有溫 rather than a party official who was endorsed by the local party and the headquarter's nomination committee, after the Chief of Staff favoured 謝有溫 from the military due to the strategic location of Penghu.

Magistrate of Taitung
Candidate	Party	Votes	%
謝有溫	Kuomintang	43,047	100.00
Total		43,047	100.00
Valid votes		43,047	94.92
Invalid/blank votes		2,303	5.08
Total votes		45,350	100.00
Registered voters/turnout		57,361	79.06
