= Kulon =

Kulon may refer to:

- Kulon language, an extinct language of the Taiwanese aboriginal people
- Klaudia Kulon (born 1992), Polish chess player

== See also ==
- Kulon Progo Regency, a regency in, Yogyakarta Special Region, Indonesia
- Ujung Kulon National Park, a national park in Banten, Indonesia
