= Northern Formosan languages =

Proposed grouping of Formosan languages

Northern Formosan
- (proposed)
- Geographic distribution: Taiwan
- Linguistic classification: Austronesian: Northern Formosan
- Subdivisions: Pazih; Saisiyat; Kulon †; Thao; Hoanya †; Papora †; Babuza †; Taokas †

Language codes
- Glottolog: west2572 (Western Plains) nort2899 (Northwestern) atay1246 (Atayalic)
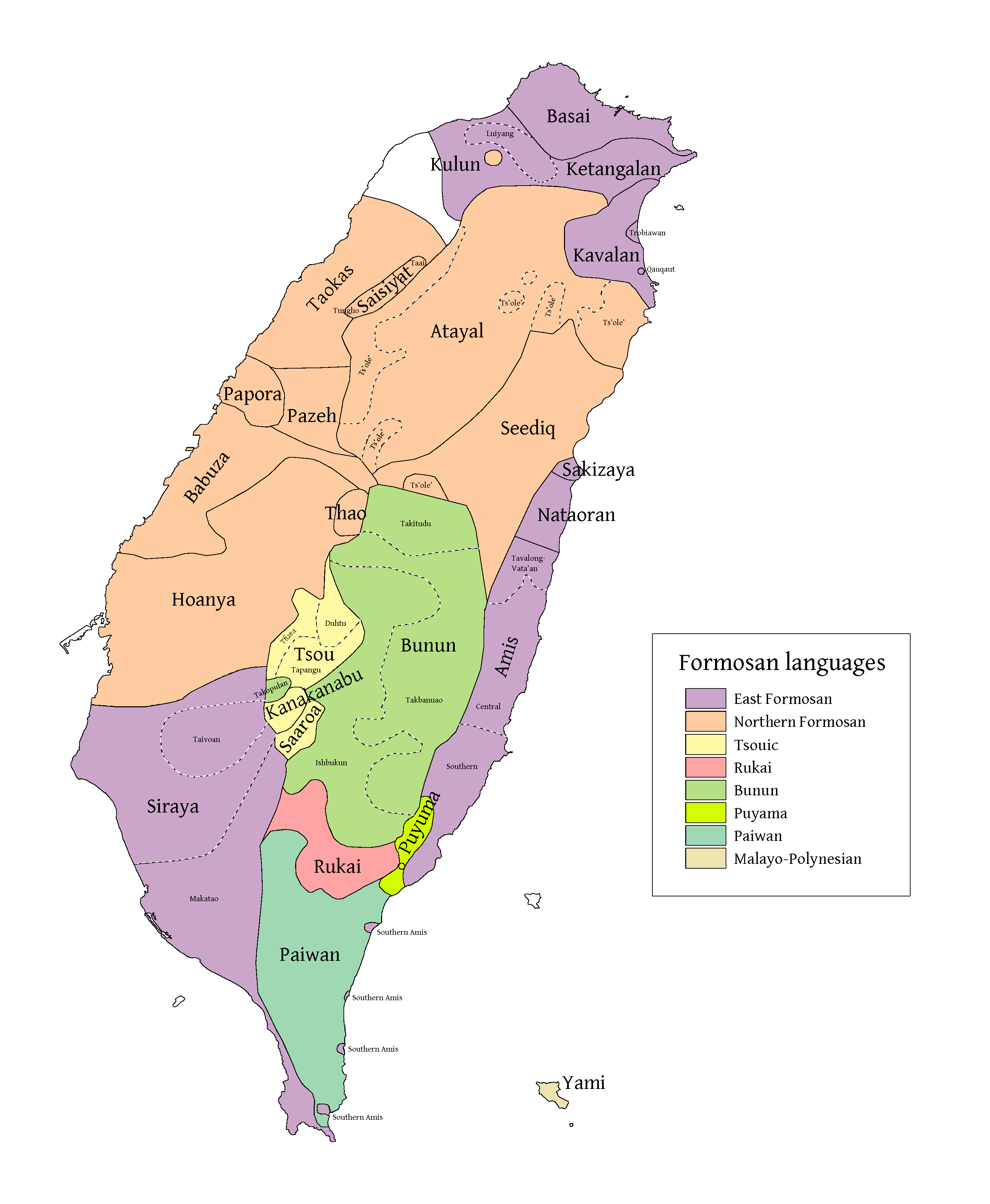
- (orange) Li's Northern Formosan

The Northern Formosan languages is a proposed grouping of Formosan languages that includes the Atayalic languages, the Western Plains languages (Papora, Hoanya, Babuza, and Taokas), and the Northwest Formosan languages (Pazeh and Saisiyat; Li places Western Plains with this grouping).

The Northern Formosan subgroup was first proposed by Paul Jen-kuei Li in 1985. Blust (1999) rejects the unity of the proposed Northern Formosan branch. A 2008 analysis of the Austronesian Basic Vocabulary Database, however, supports the unity of the Northern Formosan branch with a 97% confidence level (see Austronesian languages#Classification).

== Evidence ==
The following sound changes from Proto-Austronesian occurred in the Northern Formosan languages (Li 2008:215).

  - S_{2}, *H_{1} > h
  - S_{2}, *H_{1}, *s > h (Atayalic languages and Saisiyat only)

Also, Pazeh, Saisiyat, and Thao are only Formosan languages that allow for SVO constructions, although this may be due to intensive contact with Taiwanese.

Also, the Atayal, Seediq, and Pazeh languages have devoiced final consonants that were present in the Proto-Austronesian (Blust 2009:616).

== Northwestern Formosan ==
Li (2003, 2008) concludes the six western Plains languages split off from Proto-Northwestern Formosan. The classification is as follows.

- Northwestern
  - - Pazih
    - - Saisiyat
      - Kulon
  - - Thao
    - - Hoanya
      - - Papora
        - - Babuza
          - Taokas

The four coastal languages of Taokas, Babuza, Papora, and Hoanya share the following innovations (Li 2003).

1. Loss of *k
2. Loss of *-y
3. Merger of *s and *t in non-final position
4. Complete merger of *ŋ and *n

Thao shares the following innovations with the four coastal languages (Li 2003).

1. Merger of *s and *t
2. Merger of *ŋ and *n

Pazih has undergone the following two sound changes.

1. Merger of *j and *s as /z/
2. Merger of *C and *S_{1} as /s/

Li (2003) does not consider Pazih to be very closely related to Saisiyat (Li 2003:946).

However, Shibata (2022) argues that the "Western Plains" languages in fact form a convergence area or linguistic area rather than a true subgroup.
