= Kaxabu people =

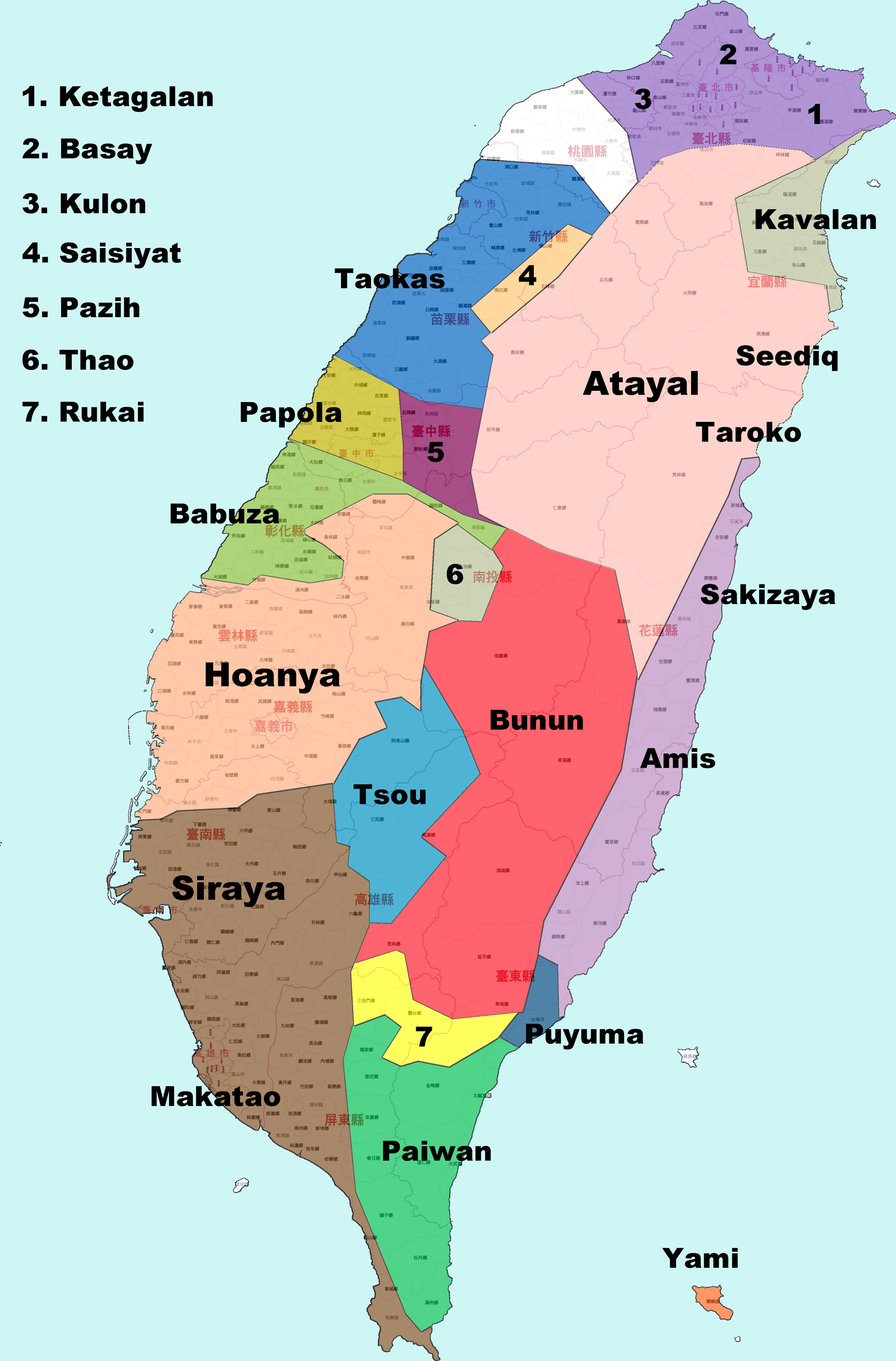
Kaxabu people live in middle Taiwan.

The Kaxabu people are a variant of the Pazeh/Kaxabu ethno-linguistic group of Taiwanese Aborigines.

Their language, an Austronesian language closely related to Pazeh, has some unique features for Austronesian languages, such as a copula (to be). It was listed as a separate language, but is now considered a dialect.

== See also ==
- Kingdom of Middag
- Formosan languages
- Taiwanese indigenous peoples
