= 1981 Taiwanese local elections =

- 14 November 1981

All 19 mayors/magistrates of cities, counties
- Turnout: 74.94%
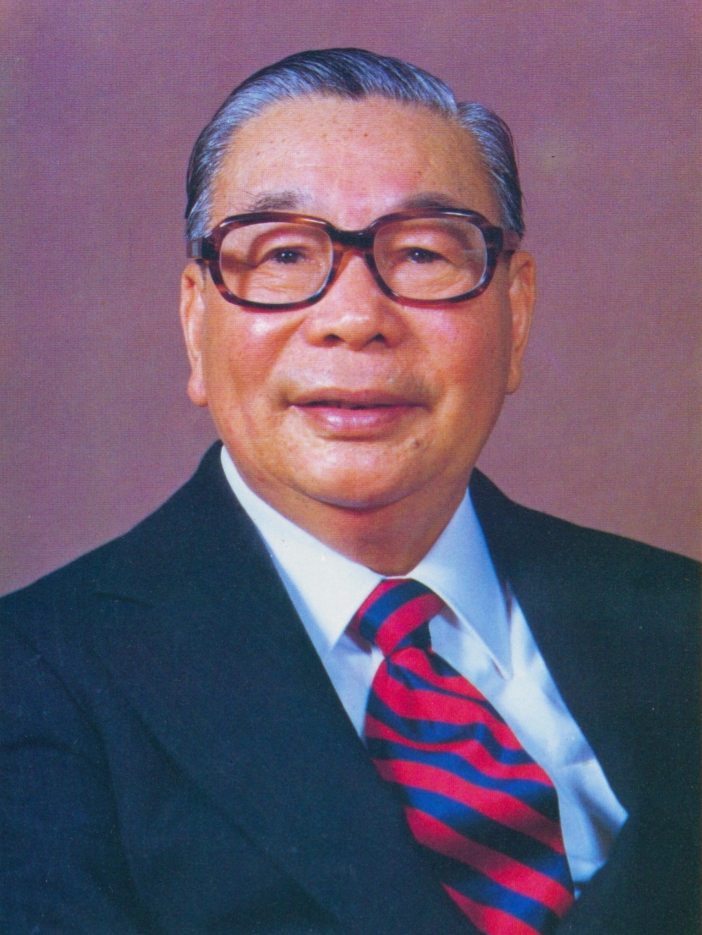
	Majority party	Minority party
Leader	Chiang Ching-kuo	None
Party	KMT	Independent
Popular vote	3,367,758	2,310,150
Percentage	59.13%	40.56%
Mayors/ Magistrates	15	4
- Kuomintang; Independents; Not up for election (Special municipalities of Taipei, Kaohsiung)

Local elections were held in Taiwan on 14 November 1981, electing 19 magistrates and mayors in the country, 77 members of the Taiwan Provincial Council, and members of the Taipei and Kaohsiung City Council.

The local poll is the first since the crackdown on the Tangwai movement. The result was largely the same with the last, with the ruling party maintaining control over 19 administrative divisions, and the opposition kept Yilan, Changhua, Pingtung, and Tainan City.

== Provincial election ==
Party	Votes	%	Seats
Kuomintang			59
Independents			18
Total			77
Valid votes	5,703,957	97.33	
Invalid/blank votes	156,471	2.67	
Total votes	5,860,428	100.00	
Registered voters/turnout	8,146,652	71.94	

	KMT	Ind	Turnout (%)
Taipei County	8	2	64.96
Yilan County	1	1	70.88
Taoyuan County	3	3	75.01
Hsinchu County	3		74.06
Miaoli County	2	1	74.67
Taichung County	4	2	78.23
Changhua County	6		79.43
Nantou County	2	1	73.48
Yunlin County	3	1	63.20
Chiayi County	3	1	66.91
Tainan County	3	2	74.06
Kaohsiung County	4	1	77.95
Pingtung County	4	1	76.38
Taitung County	1		61.38
Hualien County	1		59.24
Penghu County	1		59.53
Keelung City	1	1	67.65
Taichung City	3		74.42
Tainan City	2	1	74.64
Mountain Indigenous	2		72.89
Plains Indigenous (North)	1		64.70
Plains Indigenous (South)	1		62.62

== Mayoral and magisterial elections ==
=== Taipei ===
Magistrate of Taipei
Candidate	Party	Votes	%
Lin Fong-cheng	Kuomintang	558,263	69.79
陳進炮	Independent	174,715	21.84
李華京	Independent	37,726	4.72
陳化義	Kuomintang	29,158	3.65
Total		799,862	100.00
Valid votes		799,862	97.02
Invalid/blank votes		24,548	2.98
Total votes		824,410	100.00
Registered voters/turnout		1,269,420	64.94

=== Keelung ===
Mayor of Keelung
Candidate	Party	Votes	%
張春熙	Kuomintang	76,651	58.83
張金鐘	Independent	44,069	33.82
林培鈞	Independent	9,577	7.35
Total		130,297	100.00
Valid votes		130,297	97.20
Invalid/blank votes		3,751	2.80
Total votes		134,048	100.00
Registered voters/turnout		198,533	67.52

=== Yilan ===
After 30 years in power, Kuomintang was hit by scandals of bribery and case-for-office in Yilan. Kuomintang nominated 李讚成 to run for office after he submitted nomination form just five minutes before the deadline, despite his repeated refusal beforehand.^{:205} However divisions within the Kuomintang remained unsolved.^{:207}

The opposition Tangwai sent Chen Ding-nan after negotiations that saw his main rival You Si-kun agreed to run for Provincial Councillor instead, widely seen as a less challenging poll.^{:207-9}

Nevertheless, Chen unexpectedly defeated the ruling party and became the first non-KMT magistrate of Yilan in three decades. The nationalists would only regain the leadership in Taipei 25 years later when Chen, who returned after being urged by the Democratic Progressive Party, failed to save the losing party in Yilan.

Magistrate of Yilan
Candidate	Party	Votes	%
Chen Ding-nan	Independent	90,389	51.52
李讚成	Kuomintang	82,117	46.80
許仁修	Independent	2,939	1.68
Total		175,445	100.00
Valid votes		175,445	98.21
Invalid/blank votes		3,206	1.79
Total votes		178,651	100.00
Registered voters/turnout		251,500	71.03

=== Taoyuan ===
Magistrate of Taoyuan
Candidate	Party	Votes	%
Hsu Hung-chih	Kuomintang	255,763	59.95
呂傳勝	Independent	162,567	38.11
李思志	Independent	8,272	1.94
Total		426,602	100.00
Valid votes		426,602	97.65
Invalid/blank votes		10,279	2.35
Total votes		436,881	100.00
Registered voters/turnout		583,060	74.93

=== Hsinchu ===
Magistrate of Hsinchu
Candidate	Party	Votes	%
Chen Chin-hsing	Kuomintang	146,768	55.73
Fan Chen-tsung	Independent	88,500	33.61
劉榭燻	Kuomintang	14,744	5.60
蔡維邦	Independent	13,326	5.06
Total		263,338	100.00
Valid votes		263,338	97.49
Invalid/blank votes		6,789	2.51
Total votes		270,127	100.00
Registered voters/turnout		366,219	73.76

=== Miaoli ===
Magistrate of Miaoli
Candidate	Party	Votes	%
Hsieh Chin-ting	Kuomintang	95,063	42.25
江聰仁	Kuomintang	80,666	35.85
張鏡明	Independent	22,915	10.19
張榮顯	Independent	15,933	7.08
黃昌文	Independent	10,409	4.63
Total		224,986	100.00
Valid votes		224,986	97.35
Invalid/blank votes		6,135	2.65
Total votes		231,121	100.00
Registered voters/turnout		310,074	74.54

=== Taichung ===
Magistrate of Taichung
Candidate	Party	Votes	%
陳庚金	Kuomintang	249,097	58.32
陳正中	Independent	169,851	39.77
鄭炳照	Independent	8,171	1.91
Total		427,119	100.00
Valid votes		427,119	96.66
Invalid/blank votes		14,753	3.34
Total votes		441,872	100.00
Registered voters/turnout		565,340	78.16

Incumbent Tangwai mayor Tzeng Wen-po (曾文坡) faced challenge from KMT-supported Lin Po-jung (林柏榕) and another Tangwai colleague 劉文雄. After a "smear" campaign by the Kuomintang exposing his nightclub life, Tzeng failed to win a second term, while Lin garnered additional support from local factions.

Mayor of Taichung
Candidate	Party	Votes	%
Lin Po-jung	Kuomintang	137,174	56.34
Tzeng Wen-po	Independent	63,076	25.91
劉文雄	Independent	35,544	14.60
謝介銘	Kuomintang	7,670	3.15
Total		243,464	100.00
Valid votes		243,464	97.67
Invalid/blank votes		5,820	2.33
Total votes		249,284	100.00
Registered voters/turnout		335,084	74.39

=== Changhua ===
A fierce party primary with 14 hopefuls aiming for the party's nomination forced the party headquarter to nominate 陳伯村, friend of Vice President Hsieh Tung-min who worked in the Provincial Government and unaffiliated to any of the powerful local factions.

George Huang, who failed to win the magistrate in the last election, represented the Tangwai after he was considered to be well known in the county, despite facing some criticisms of "fake opposition". Huang Shun-hsing, the main foe of George Huang and former Taitung Magistrate, agreed to support him as an act of courtesy.

The grievance by the local factions and the uninspiring performance by Kuomintang's incumbent magistrate boosted Huang's support. The independent eventually defeated the KMT's nominee, the first in 12 years.

Magistrate of Changhua
Candidate	Party	Votes	%
George Huang	Independent	270,520	53.57
陳伯村	Kuomintang	234,488	46.43
Total		505,008	100.00
Valid votes		505,008	96.99
Invalid/blank votes		15,673	3.01
Total votes		520,681	100.00
Registered voters/turnout		655,622	79.42

=== Nantou ===
Kuomintang put up Wu Den-yih's name for Nantou's poll. The Taipei City Councillor ranked eighth in the party's primary, thus prompting 楊國平, who won the primary, to resign from the party and join the race.

Supported by the opposition, 楊國平 was nonetheless unable to block Wu after losing the race, receiving around 40% of votes. Wu embarked on his triumphant political journey, leading him to the vice-presidency.

Magistrate of Nantou
Candidate	Party	Votes	%
Wu Den-yih	Kuomintang	130,322	60.54
楊國平	Independent	84,932	39.46
Total		215,254	100.00
Valid votes		215,254	97.67
Invalid/blank votes		5,130	2.33
Total votes		220,384	100.00
Registered voters/turnout		300,126	73.43

=== Yunlin ===
Magistrate of Yunlin
Candidate	Party	Votes	%
Hsu Wen-tsu	Kuomintang	157,453	57.24
黃蔴	Independent	117,638	42.76
Total		275,091	100.00
Valid votes		275,091	97.18
Invalid/blank votes		7,971	2.82
Total votes		283,062	100.00
Registered voters/turnout		447,926	63.19

=== Chiayi ===
Magistrate of Chiayi
Candidate	Party	Votes	%
涂德錡	Kuomintang	215,539	70.11
林麗蓮	Independent	74,270	24.16
吳光耀	Young China Party	17,612	5.73
Total		307,421	100.00
Valid votes		307,421	96.43
Invalid/blank votes		11,386	3.57
Total votes		318,807	100.00
Registered voters/turnout		477,744	66.73

=== Tainan ===
Yang Pao-fa (楊寶發), the nationalist's incumbent magistrate, was apparently uninterested in re-election initially. He changed his mind after his rumoured promotion to the party headquarter was lost. Lee Ya-chiao (李雅樵), who was determined to represent the party in the upcoming election, came second in the party primary by a small margin.^{:75-81} As the party settled on Yang's nomination, Lee's supporters urged Lee to ran in the election. He at last accepted the invitation by the party to become a county official as compensation.^{:82,85}

Two months before the election, Tainan was hit by downpour by typhoon. Without any rescue and food supply for two days, residents of the most affected regions denounced the local government for their slow response,^{:89} harming the support of the incumbent.

On the other hand, Tangwai endorsed 蔡四結 who left the party before the election.^{:93-4} Although unable to challenge Yang, he outranked the incumbent in the hard-hit township, demonstrating the anger by the public.

Magistrate of Tainan
Candidate	Party	Votes	%
Yang Pao-fa	Kuomintang	215,662	53.27
蔡四結	Independent	189,172	46.73
Total		404,834	100.00
Valid votes		404,834	96.84
Invalid/blank votes		13,198	3.16
Total votes		418,032	100.00
Registered voters/turnout		568,587	73.52

Su Nan-cheng, the incumbent mayor of Tainan, was seen as a shifting figure between the Kuomintang and Tangwai after he inclined towards the ruling party and denounced the liberals in the Kaohsiung crackdown. During his first four years of office he enjoyed well reputation for efficient governance. Kuomintang decided against endorsing any hopefuls and allowed open race. Tangwai also did not send anyone to challenge the incumbent. Scandals including alleged bribery and collusion between Su and the KMT did little to damage the incumbent's re-election hope. Sweeping 77% of ballots, Su became the first Tainan Mayor to start a second term of office. He rejoined the party in the next year under Chiang Ching-kuo's directive.

Mayor of Tainan
Candidate	Party	Votes	%
Su Nan-cheng	Independent	190,588	77.17
王奕棋	Kuomintang	34,294	13.89
林永發	Kuomintang	11,391	4.61
林三和	Kuomintang	10,704	4.33
Total		246,977	100.00
Valid votes		246,977	98.73
Invalid/blank votes		3,173	1.27
Total votes		250,150	100.00
Registered voters/turnout		335,141	74.64

=== Kaohsiung ===
Local party in Kaohsiung supported Deputy Speaker Tsai Ming-yao from the local "white faction" to hold the city's seat. Tangwai was represented by Yu Chen Yueh-ying, with the backing of opposition heavyweight Yu Teng-fa. During the governance of KMT, the size of electorate in the county surged significantly, one of the towns saw its franchise expanded by a half.

After voting ended, televised live of vote counting abruptly suspended for a while. Mrs. Yu, who was originally leading Tsai by more than 20,000 votes, was narrowly defeated eventually. Yu Teng-fa, outraged by the fraudulent result, blamed himself for not doing the best while supervising the vote count.

Magistrate of Kaohsiung
Candidate	Party	Votes	%
Tsai Ming-yao	Kuomintang	212,726	49.91
Yu Chen Yueh-ying	Independent	209,109	49.06
陳進昌	Independent	4,390	1.03
Total		426,225	100.00
Valid votes		426,225	98.11
Invalid/blank votes		8,214	1.89
Total votes		434,439	100.00
Registered voters/turnout		557,579	77.92

=== Pingtung ===
Chiou Lien-hui, member of the Tangwai after leaving the party four years ago, was serving as Provincial Councillor, but decided to run for Pingtung Magistrate after refusing Province Chairman's offer in government.

Due to the demographic in the county, Hokkien community was by convention considered to be the rightful holder of the leadership with the Hakka deputising. Kuomintang therefore nominated Hokkien 陳恒盛, while Chiou was, on the other hand, questioned for endorsing Hakka in the previous election.

Kuomintang was allegedly attempting to instigate hatred against Hakka to gather more votes, as 陳恒盛 repeatedly highlighted the importance of Hokkien's unity in canvassing. In spite of the Hokkien–Hakka bitter relations, Chiou beat KMT after rallying support from some of the Hokkien and some from the Kuomintang.

Magistrate of Pingtung
Candidate	Party	Votes	%
Chiou Lien-hui	Independent	186,925	49.49
陳恒盛	Kuomintang	166,168	43.99
陳榮宗	Independent	14,273	3.78
林忠嘉	Independent	7,388	1.96
李慶和	Independent	2,966	0.79
Total		377,720	100.00
Valid votes		377,720	97.52
Invalid/blank votes		9,619	2.48
Total votes		387,339	100.00
Registered voters/turnout		507,170	76.37

=== Taitung ===
Facing resentment from some of the local factions for favouring the rivalry factions, Chiang Sheng-ai (蔣聖愛), the incumbent, was re-elected but with three quarters of votes only. Some 25% went to political outsider 屠耀生, a taxi driver, regarded as no-confidence ballots against Chiang.

Magistrate of Taitung
Candidate	Party	Votes	%
Chiang Sheng-ai	Kuomintang	69,813	75.24
屠耀生	Kuomintang	22,980	24.76
Total		92,793	100.00
Valid votes		92,793	95.99
Invalid/blank votes		3,878	4.01
Total votes		96,671	100.00
Registered voters/turnout		154,422	62.60

=== Hualian ===
Magistrate of Hualian
Candidate	Party	Votes	%
吳水雲	Kuomintang	119,980	100.00
Total		119,980	100.00
Valid votes		119,980	95.47
Invalid/blank votes		5,697	4.53
Total votes		125,677	100.00
Registered voters/turnout		204,359	61.50

=== Penghu ===
Magistrate of Taitung
Candidate	Party	Votes	%
謝有溫	Kuomintang	33,104	100.00
Total		33,104	100.00
Valid votes		33,104	95.72
Invalid/blank votes		1,482	4.28
Total votes		34,586	100.00
Registered voters/turnout		58,104	59.52
