= Kulon language =

Northwest Formosan language of Taiwan

Kulon
- Kulun
- Native to: Taiwan
- Extinct: (date missing)
- Language family: Austronesian: Northwest Formosan; Kulon

Language codes
- ISO 639-3: uon
- Glottolog: kulo1238
- Linguasphere: 30-BCA-aa
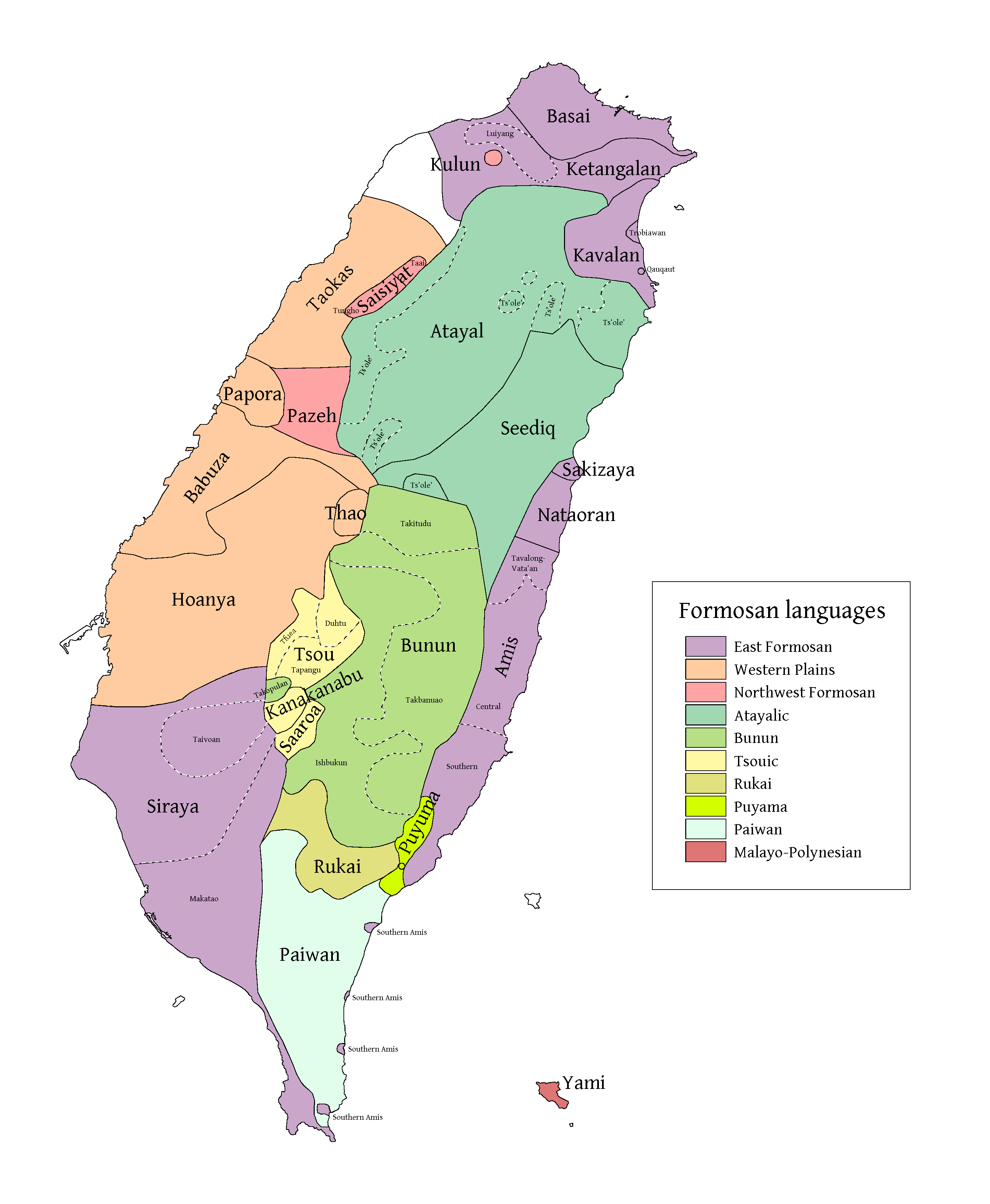
- (pink, northwest) Saisiyat, Pazeh and Kulon. Some Chinese-language sources designate the white area in the northwest as a Kulon area, as opposed to the small pink circle on this map.

Kulon (occasionally rendered Kulun) is an extinct language of the Taiwanese aboriginal people that belonged to the Austronesian language family. Very little data is available for Kulon; the primary source is the 60 pages of Tsuchida (1985). Li (2008) follows Tsuchida in linking Kulon with Saisiyat, while Blust (1999) proposes it was more closely related to Pazeh.
