= 1977 Romanian local elections =

Local elections were held in the Socialist Republic of Romania on 20 November 1977.

A mandate represented two and a half years, according to 1965 Constitution of Romania.
