= Saisiyat language =

Austronesian language spoken in Taiwan

Saisiyat
- SaiSiyat
- Native to: Taiwan
- Ethnicity: 7,900
- Native speakers: 4,750 (2002)
- Language family: Austronesian: Northwest Formosan; Saisiyat
- Dialects: Taai; Tungho

Language codes
- ISO 639-3: xsy
- Glottolog: sais1237
- ELP: Saisiyat
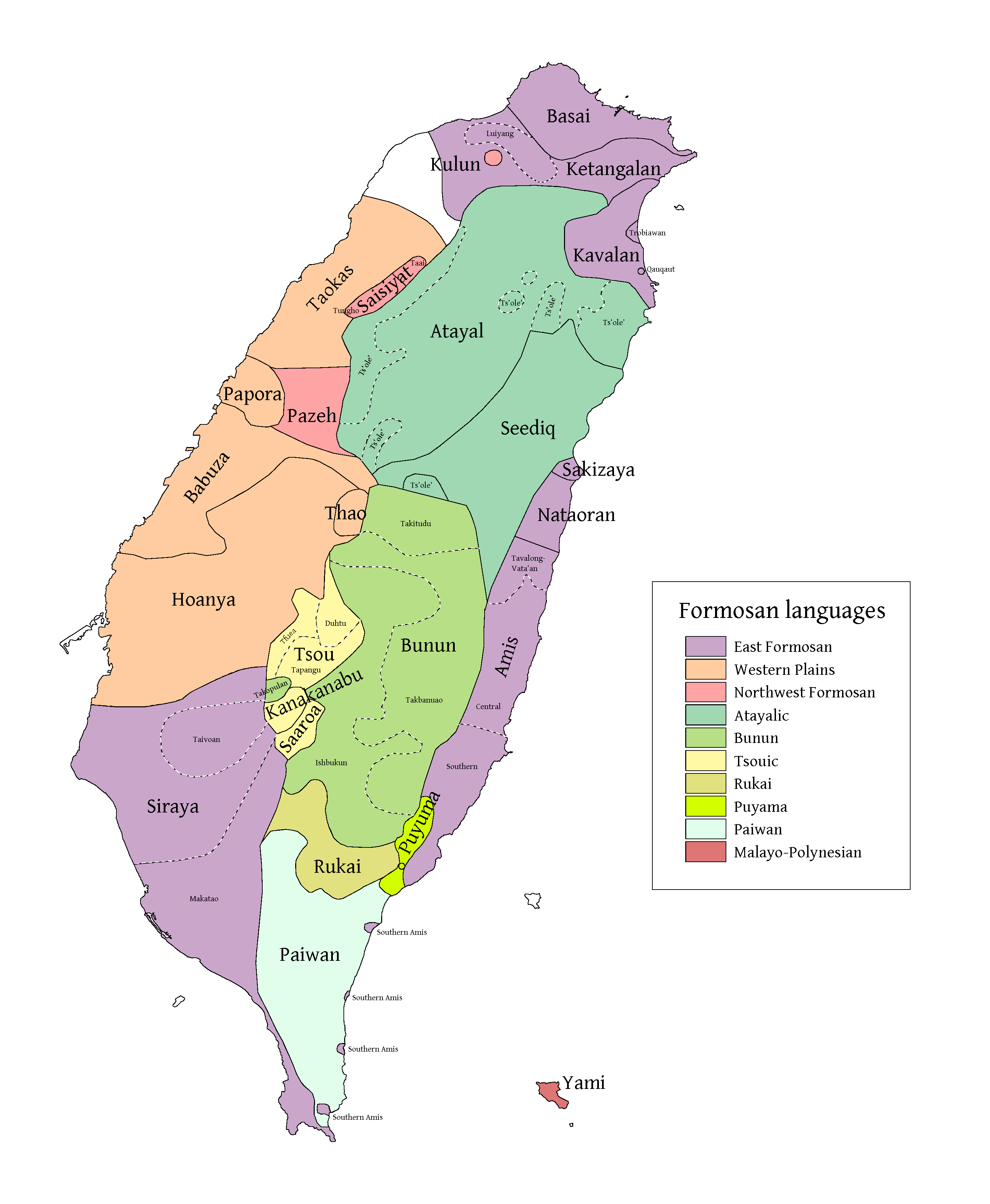
- Saisiyat, Pazeh, and Kulon (pink, northwest). Some Chinese-language sources designate the white area in the northwest as a Kulon area, as opposed to the small pink circle on this map.

- Saisiyat is classified as severely endangered by the UNESCO Atlas of the World's Languages in Danger

Saisiyat (sometimes spelled Saisiat) is the language of the Saisiyat, a Taiwanese indigenous people. It is a Formosan language of the Austronesian family. It has approximately 4,750 speakers.

== Distribution ==
The language area of Saisiyat is small, situated in the northwest of the country between the Hakka Chinese and Atayal regions in the mountains (Wufeng, Hsinchu; Nanchuang and Shitan, Miaoli).

There are two main dialects: Ta'ai (North Saisiyat) and Tungho (South Saisiyat). Ta'ai is spoken in Hsinchu and Tungho is spoken in Miao-Li.

Kulon, an extinct Formosan language, is closely related to Saisiyat but is considered by Taiwanese linguist Paul Jen-kuei Li to be a separate language.

== Usage ==
Today, one thousand Saisiyat people do not use the Saisiyat language. Many young people use Hakka or Atayal instead, and few children speak Saisiyat. Hakka Chinese speakers, Atayal speakers and Saisiyat speakers live more or less together. Many Saisiyat are able to speak Saisiyat, Hakka, Atayal, Mandarin, and, sometimes, Min Nan as well. Although Saisiyat has a relatively large number of speakers, the language is endangered.

== Phonology ==
=== Consonants ===
Consonant inventory
	Labial		Alveolar		Post-alveolar		Dorsal		Glottal
Nasal		m		n				ŋ	
Plosive	p		t				k		ʔ
Fricative			s	z	ʃ				h
Approximant		w		l		ɭ		j	
Trill				r					

Orthographic notes:

- /ɭ/ is a retroflex lateral approximant, while /ʃ/ is a palato-alveolar fricative.

=== Vowels ===
Monophthongs
	Front	Central	Back
Close	i		
Close-mid			o
Mid		ə	
Open-mid	œ		
Open	æ	ä	

== Orthography ==
- a - [ä]
- ae - [æ]
- b - [β]
- e - [ə]
- ng - [ŋ]
- oe - [œ]
- s - [s/θ]
- S - [ʃ]
- y - [j]
- z - [z/ð]
- ʼ - [ʔ]
- aa/aː - [aː]
- ee/eː - [əː]
- ii/iː - [iː]

== Grammar ==
=== Syntax ===
Although it also allows for verb-initial constructions, Saisiyat is a strongly subject-initial language (i.e., SVO), and is shifting to an accusative language, while it still has many features of split ergativity (Hsieh & Huang 2006:91). Pazeh and Thao, also Northern Formosan languages, are the only other Formosan languages that allow for SVO constructions.

Saisiyat case-marking system distinguishes between personal and common nouns (Hsieh & Huang 2006:93).

Saisiyat case markers
Type of Noun	Nominative	Accusative	Genitive	Dative	Possessive	Locative
Personal	Ø, hi	hi	ni	ʼan-a	ʼiniʼ	kan, kala
Common	Ø, ka	ka	noka	ʼan noka-a	no	ray

=== Pronouns ===
Saisiyat has an elaborate pronominal system (Hsieh & Huang 2006:93).

Saisiyat personal pronouns
Type of Pronoun	Nominative	Accusative	Genitive	Dative	Possessive	Locative
1s.	yako/yao	yakin/ʼiyakin	maʼan	ʼiniman	ʼamanaʼa	kanman
2s.	Soʼo	ʼisoʼon	niSo	ʼiniSo	ʼansoʼoʼa	kanSo
3s.	sia	hisia	nisia	ʼinisia	ʼansiaa	kansia
1p. (incl.)	ʼita	ʼinimita	mitaʼ	ʼinimitaʼ	ʼanmitaʼa	kanʼita
1p. (excl.)	yami	ʼiniyaʼom	niyaʼom	ʼiniyaʼom	ʼanyaʼoma	kanyami
2p.	moyo	ʼinimon	nimon	ʼinimon	ʼanmoyoa	kanmoyo
3p.	lasia	hilasia	nasia	ʼinilasia	ʼanlasiaa	kanlasia

=== Verbs ===
The following are verbal prefixes in Saisiyat (Hsieh & Huang 2006:93).

Saisiyat Focus System
Type of Focus	I	II
Agent Focus (AF)	m-, -om-, ma-, Ø	Ø
Patient Focus (PF)	-en	-i
Locative Focus (LF)	-an	—
Referential Focus (RF)	si-, sik-	-ani

Saisiyat verbs can be nominalized in the following ways.

Nominalization in Saisiyat
	Lexical nominalization	Syntactic nominalization	Temporal/Aspectual
Agent	ka-ma-V	ka-pa-V	Habitual, Future
Patient	ka-V-en, V-in-	ka-V-en, V-in-	Future (for ka-V-en), Perfective (for V-in-)
Location	ka-V-an	ka-V-an	Future
Instrument	ka-V, Ca-V (reduplication)	ka-V, Ca-V (reduplication)	Future

== Lexicon ==
Saisiyat has had influence from Japanese due to the Japanese occupation of Taiwan and Mandarin due to the Taiwanese governments former encouragement of the language. It also contains influence from Hakka though this varies wildly between more isolated dialects with almost no Hakka influence and less isolated dialects with heavy Hakka influence.
