= Indigenous Area (Taiwan) =

Administrative divisions in Taiwan with significant populations of indigenous peoples

Indigenous Areas (Chinese: 原住民族地區; pinyin: yuánzhùmínzú dìqū; Pe̍h-ōe-jī: Goân-chū bîn-cho̍k tē-khu) are the administrative divisions in Taiwan with significant populations of Taiwanese indigenous peoples. These areas are granted a higher level of local autonomy. Currently there are 55 such divisions.

== History ==
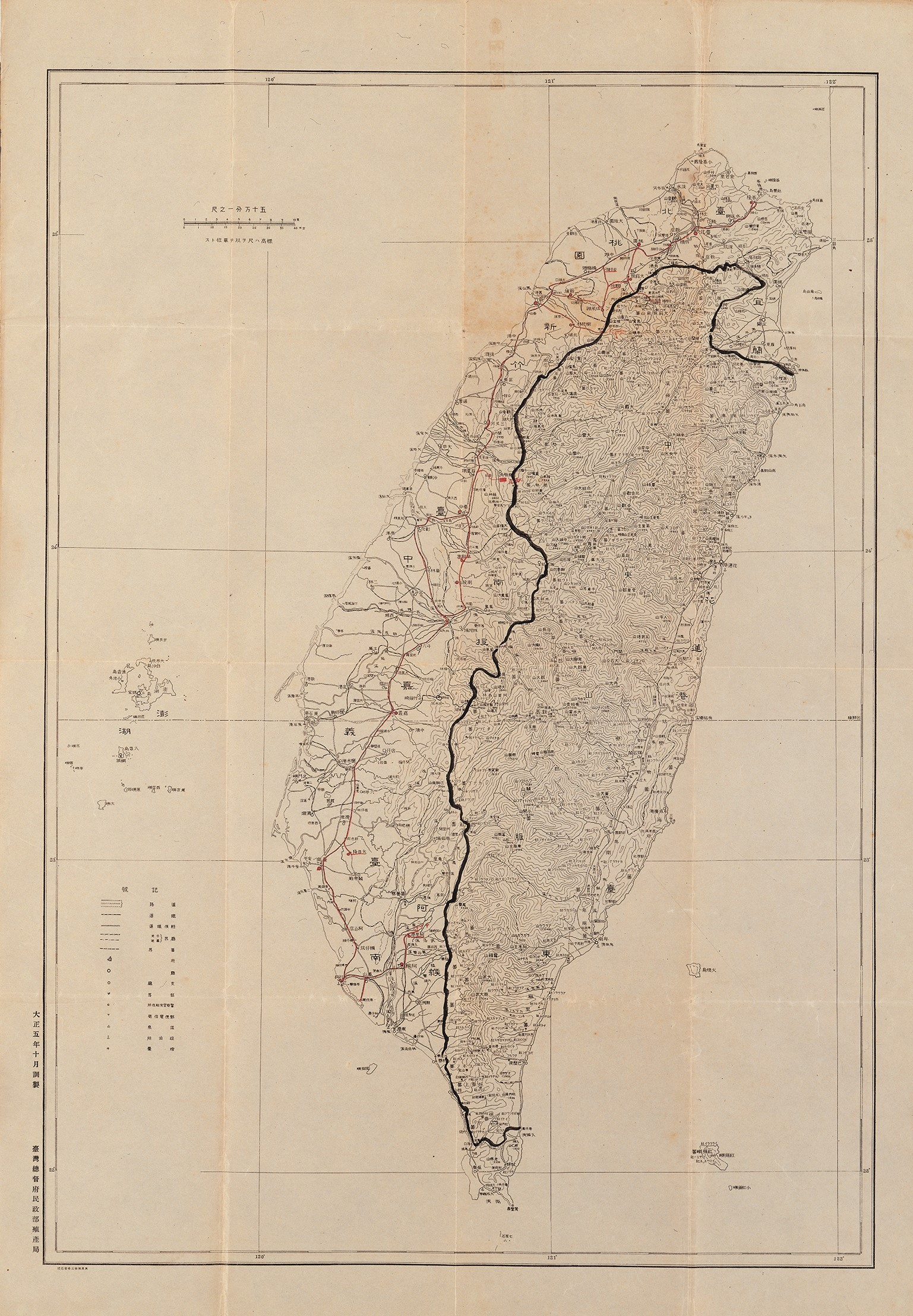
1926 map of indigenous areas in Taiwan under Japanese rule

Indigenous areas in Taiwan: Mountain indigenous areas Plains indigenous areas

On 31 October 2001, the Indigenous Peoples Employment Rights Protection Act was promulgated. In order to implement the provisions of the act, the Council of Indigenous Peoples designated 30 mountain indigenous townships and districts and 25 townships and cities as indigenous areas.

== List of indigenous areas ==
| Special municipality / county | Mountain indigenous | | Rural | Urban | County- administered city |
| Special municipality / county | District | Township | Township | | County- administered city |
|---|---|---|---|---|---|
| New Taipei City | 1 | | | | |
| Yilan County | | 2 | | | |
| Taoyuan City | 1 | | | | |
| Hsinchu County | | 2 | 1 | | |
| Miaoli County | | 1 | 2 | | |
| Taichung City | 1 | | | | |
| Nantou County | | 2 | 1 | | |
| Chiayi County | | 1 | | | |
| Kaohsiung City | 3 | | | | |
| Pingtung County | | 8 | 1 | | |
| Taitung County | | 5 | 7 | 2 | 1 |
| Hualien County | | 3 | 7 | 2 | 1 |
| Total | 6 | 24 | 19 | 4 | 2 |

| Name | Chinese | Taiwanese | Hakka | Formosan | Type | Division | Common languages |
|---|---|---|---|---|---|---|---|
| Nan'ao | 南澳鄉 | Lâm-ò | Nàm-o | Klesan, Kbbu'^{Atayal} | Mountain indigenous township | Yilan | Atayal |
| Datong | 大同鄉 | Tāi-tông | Thai-thùng | Minnao, Mnibu^{Atayal} | Mountain indigenous township | Yilan | Atayal |
| Wulai | 烏來區 | U-lai | Vû-lòi | Ulay^{Atayal} | Mountain indigenous district | New Taipei | Atayal |
| Fuxing | 復興區 | Hok-heng | Fu̍k-hîn | Pyasan^{Atayal} | Mountain indigenous district | Taoyuan | Atayal |
| Guanxi | 關西鎮 | Koan-se | Kûan-sî | | Urban township | Hsinchu | Atayal |
| Jianshi | 尖石鄉 | Chiam-chio̍h | Tsiâm-sa̍k | Nahuy^{Atayal} | Mountain indigenous township | Hsinchu | Atayal |
| Wufeng | 五峰鄉 | Ngó͘-hong | Ńg-fûng | Tatoba'^{Atayal}, Kilapa:^{Saisiyat} | Mountain indigenous township | Hsinchu | Atayal, Saisiyat |
| Nanzhuang | 南庄鄉 | Lâm-chng | Nàm-chông | pinSa'o:ol^{Saisiyat} | Rural township | Miaoli | Saisiyat |
| Shitan | 獅潭鄉 | Sai-thâm | Sṳ̂-thàn | Sawi'^{Saisiyat} | Rural township | Miaoli | Saisiyat |
| Tai'an | 泰安鄉 | Thài-an | Thai-ôn | Taian^{Atayal} | Mountain indigenous township | Miaoli | Atayal |
| Heping | 和平區 | Hô-pêng | Fò-phìn | Pasing^{Atayal} | Mountain indigenous district | Taichung | Atayal |
| Yuchi | 魚池鄉 | Hî-tî | Ǹg-tshṳ̀ | Qabizay^{Thao} | Rural township | Nantou | Thao |
| Xinyi | 信義鄉 | Sìn-gī | Sin-ngi | Nehunpu-siang^{Bunun} | Mountain indigenous township | Nantou | Bunun |
| Ren'ai | 仁愛鄉 | Jîn-ài | Yìn-oi | Paran, Musha^{Atayal} | Mountain indigenous township | Nantou | Atayal, Bunun, Seediq |
| Alishan | 阿里山鄉 | A-lí-san | Â-lî-sân | Psoseongana^{Tsou} | Mountain indigenous township | Chiayi | Tsou |
| Namasia | 那瑪夏區 | Namasia | Namasia | Namasia^{Bunun, Kanakanavu} | Mountain indigenous district | Kaohsiung | Bunun, Kanakanavu |
| Tauyuan | 桃源區 | Thô-goân | Thò-ngièn | Ngani^{Bunun} | Mountain indigenous district | Kaohsiung | Bunun, Saaroa |
| Maolin | 茂林區 | Bō͘-lîm | Meu-lìm | Teldreka^{Rukai} | Mountain indigenous district | Kaohsiung | Rukai |
| Manzhou | 滿州鄉 | Bóan-chiu | Mân-chû | Manutsuru^{Paiwan} | Rural township | Pingtung | Paiwan |
| Sandimen | 三地門鄉 | Soaⁿ-tē-mn̂g | Sâm-thi-mùn | Timur^{Paiwan} | Mountain indigenous township | Pingtung | Paiwan, Rukai |
| Wutai | 霧臺鄉 | Bū-tâi | Vu-thòi | Vedai^{Rukai} | Mountain indigenous township | Pingtung | Rukai |
| Majia | 瑪家鄉 | Má-ka | Mâ-kâ | Makazayazaya^{Paiwan} | Mountain indigenous township | Pingtung | Paiwan |
| Taiwu | 泰武鄉 | Thài-bú | Thai-vú | Klaljuc^{Paiwan} | Mountain indigenous township | Pingtung | Paiwan |
| Laiyi | 來義鄉 | Lâi-gī | Lòi-ngi | Rai^{Paiwan} | Mountain indigenous township | Pingtung | Paiwan |
| Chunri | 春日鄉 | Chhun-ji̍t | Tshûn-ngit | Kasugagu^{Paiwan} | Mountain indigenous township | Pingtung | Paiwan |
| Shizi | 獅子鄉 | Sai-chú | Sṳ̂-é | Sisigu^{Paiwan} | Mountain indigenous township | Pingtung | Paiwan |
| Mudan | 牡丹鄉 | Bó͘-tan | Méu-tân | Sinvaudjan^{Paiwan} | Mountain indigenous township | Pingtung | Paiwan |
| Taitung City | 臺東市 | Tâi-tang | Thòi-tûng | Pusung^{Amis, Paiwan, Puyuma} | County-administered city | Taitung | Amis, Paiwan, Puyuma |
| Chenggong | 成功鎮 | Sêng-kong | Sṳ̀n-kûng | Madawdaw^{Amis} | Urban township | Taitung | Amis |
| Guanshan | 關山鎮 | Koan-san | Kûan-sân | Lilong^{Amis} | Urban township | Taitung | Amis |
| Beinan | 卑南鄉 | Pi-lâm | Pî-nàm | Puyuma^{Amis&Puyuma}, Pinang^{Rukai} | Rural township | Taitung | Amis, Puyuma, Rukai |
| Dawu | 大武鄉 | Tāi-bú | Thai-vú | Palangoe^{Paiwan} | Rural township | Taitung | Paiwan |
| Taimali | 太麻里鄉 | Thài-mâ-lí | Thai-mà-lî | Tjavualji^{Amis, Paiwan} | Rural township | Taitung | Amis, Paiwan |
| Changbin | 長濱鄉 | Tn̂g-pin | Tshòng-pîn | Kakacawan^{Amis} | Rural township | Taitung | Amis |
| Donghe | 東河鄉 | Tong-hô | Tûng-hò | Fafukod^{Amis} | Rural township | Taitung | Amis |
| Luye | 鹿野鄉 | Lo̍k-iá | Lu̍k-yâ | Parayabay^{Amis} | Rural township | Taitung | Amis |
| Chishang | 池上鄉 | Tî-siōng | Tshṳ̀-song | Fanaw^{Amis} | Rural township | Taitung | Amis |
| Yanping | 延平鄉 | Iân-pêng | Yèn-phìn | Inpiing^{Bunun} | Mountain indigenous township | Taitung | Bunun |
| Haiduan | 海端鄉 | Hái-toaⁿ | Hói-tôn | Haitutuan^{Bunun} | Mountain indigenous township | Taitung | Bunun |
| Daren | 達仁鄉 | Ta̍t-jîn | Tha̍t-yìn | Tadren^{Paiwan} | Mountain indigenous township | Taitung | Paiwan |
| Jinfeng | 金峰鄉 | Kim-hong | Kîm-fûng | Kinzang^{Paiwan} | Mountain indigenous township | Taitung | Paiwan |
| Lanyu | 蘭嶼鄉 | Lân-sū | Làn-yí | Ponso no Tao^{Yami} | Mountain indigenous township | Taitung | Yami |
| Hualien City | 花蓮市 | Hoa-liân | Fâ-lièn | Kalinko^{Amis}, Nabakuwan^{Sakizaya} | County-administered city | Hualien | Amis, Sakizaya, Truku |
| Fenglin | 鳳林鎮 | Hōng-lîm | Fung-lìm | Marlimu^{Amis} | Urban township | Hualien | Amis |
| Yuli | 玉里鎮 | Gio̍k-lí | Ngiu̍k-lî | Posko^{Amis} | Urban township | Hualien | Amis |
| Xincheng | 新城鄉 | Sin-siâⁿ | Sîn-sàng | Sinjiyu^{Truku}, Takidis^{Amis} | Rural township | Hualien | Amis, Truku |
| Ji'an | 吉安鄉 | Kiat-an | Kit-ôn | Cikasuan^{Amis} | Rural township | Hualien | Amis, Truku |
| Shoufeng | 壽豐鄉 | Siū-hong | Su-fûng | Ciamengan^{Amis} | Rural township | Hualien | Amis |
| Guangfu | 光復鄉 | Kong-ho̍k | Kông-fu̍k | Fata'an^{Amis} | Rural township | Hualien | Amis |
| Fengbin | 豐濱鄉 | Hong-pin | Fûng-pîn | Fakon^{Amis}, Bakung^{Kavalan} | Rural township | Hualien | Amis, Kavalan |
| Ruisui | 瑞穗鄉 | Sūi-sūi | Lui-sui | Kohkoh^{Amis} | Rural township | Hualien | Amis |
| Fuli | 富里鄉 | Hù-lí | Fu-lî | Kongpo^{Amis} | Rural township | Hualien | Amis |
| Xiulin | 秀林鄉 | Siù-lîm | Siu-lìm | Bsuring^{Truku} | Mountain indigenous township | Hualien | Truku |
| Wanrong | 萬榮鄉 | Bān-êng | Van-yùng | Malibasi^{Truku} | Mountain indigenous township | Hualien | Truku, Bunun |
| Zhuoxi | 卓溪鄉 | Toh-khe | Cho̍k-hâi | Takkei^{Bunun} | Mountain indigenous township | Hualien | Bunun |

== See also ==
- Taiwanese indigenous peoples
- Administrative divisions of Taiwan
- Township (Taiwan)
- District (Taiwan)
