= Pazeh people =

Descendants of indigenous people of Taiwan

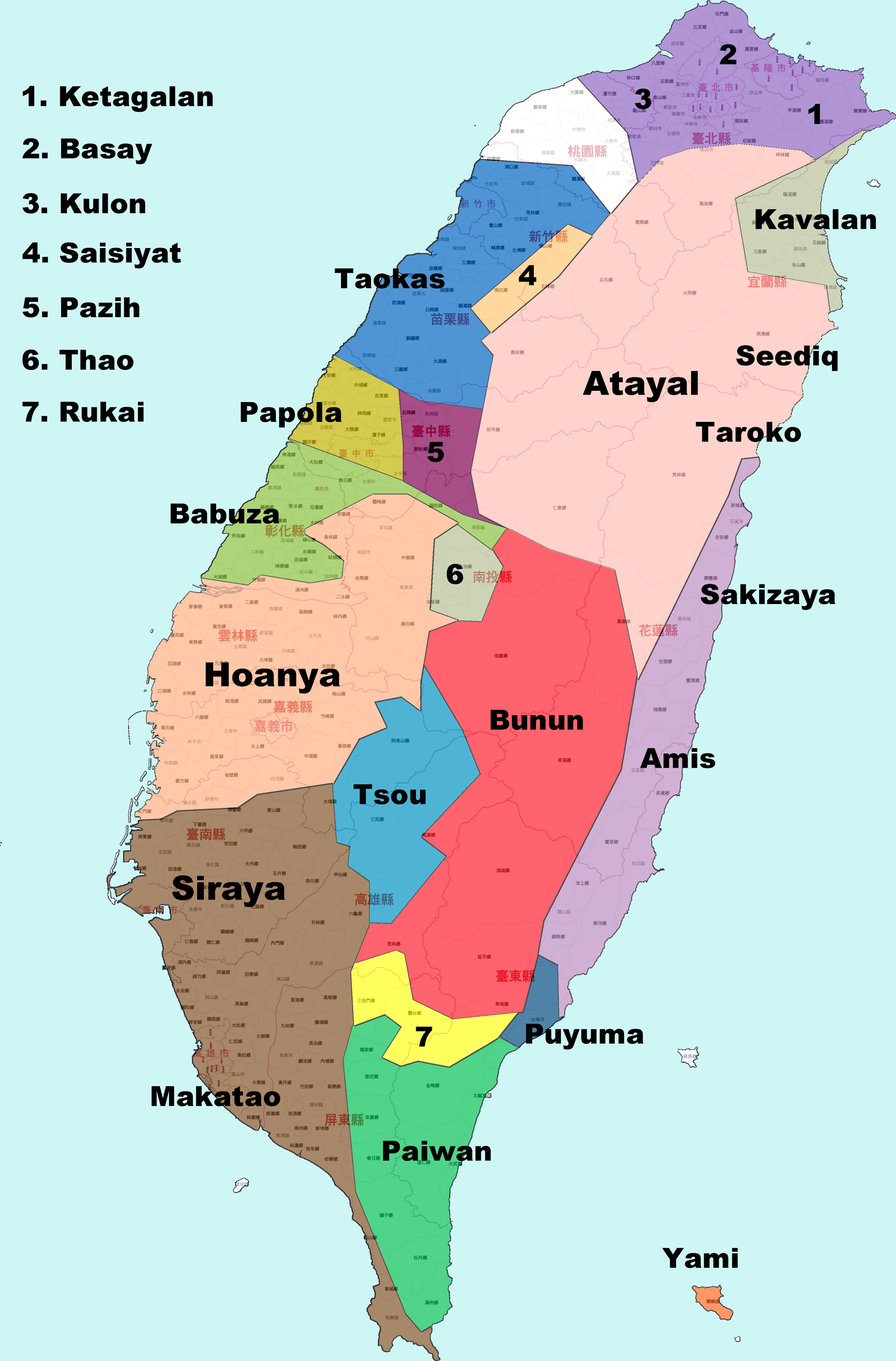
Pazeh people formerly lived in the central area of Taiwan, labeled by dark purple.

The Pazeh people (or Pazih; 巴則海 or 巴宰), including the Kaxabu, are the descendants of the Pazeh-speaking indigenous people from Taichung and Miaoli areas of Taiwan. Due to the processes of acculturation and cultural assimilation, the majority of Taiwanese who identify themselves as Pazeh reside in the Ai-lan district (愛蘭地區) in the central city of Puli, Nantou. Christian missionaries arrived in Taiwan in 1865, and the Pazeh people in the area were fully converted to the religion by 1871.

== Current status ==
The current Pazih community is located around the Ai-lan (愛蘭) Taiwanese Presbyterian Church, which provides support for the Pazeh cultural revival and political mobilization. Presbyterian minister Rev. Daxawan Lai built a museum for Pazeh artifacts and to be a center for Pazeh language learning and cultural activities. The Ai-lan Pazih are currently petitioning Taiwan's government for official status as a recognized Taiwanese Aboriginal ethnic group.

== See also ==
- Pazeh language
- Kingdom of Middag
- Taiwanese indigenous peoples
