= Formosan languages =

Austronesian languages of Taiwan

Formosan
- (geographic)
- Geographic distribution: Taiwan
- Ethnicity: Taiwanese Aborigines (Formosan people)
- Linguistic classification: Austronesian: Formosan
- Proto-language: Proto-Austronesian
- Subdivisions: East Formosan; Northwest Formosan; Western Plains; Atayalic; Bunun; Tsouic; Rukai; Puyuma; Paiwan

Language codes
- ISO 639-5: fox
- Glottolog: None
- Families of Formosan languages before Chinese colonization, per Blust (1999). Malayo-Polynesian (red) may lie within Eastern Formosan (purple). The white section is unattested; some maps fill it in with Luiyang, Kulon or as generic 'Ketagalan'.

The Formosan languages are a geographic grouping of Austronesian languages spoken by the Indigenous peoples of Taiwan. They do not form a single subfamily of Austronesian but rather up to nine separate primary subfamilies. The Taiwanese Indigenous peoples recognized by the government are about 2.3% of the island's population. However, only 35% speak their ancestral language, due to centuries of language shift. Of the approximately 26 languages of the Taiwanese Indigenous peoples, at least ten are extinct, another four (perhaps five) are moribund, and all others are to some degree endangered. They are national languages of Taiwan.

The Indigenous languages of Taiwan have great significance in historical linguistics since, in all likelihood, Taiwan is the place of origin of the entire Austronesian language family. According to American linguist Robert Blust, the Formosan languages form nine of the ten principal branches of the family, while the one remaining principal branch, Malayo-Polynesian, contains nearly 1,200 Austronesian languages found outside Taiwan. Although some other linguists disagree with some details of Blust's analysis, a broad consensus has coalesced around the conclusion that the Austronesian languages originated in Taiwan, and the theory has been strengthened by recent studies in human population genetics.

== Recent history ==
All Formosan languages are slowly being replaced by the culturally dominant Taiwanese Mandarin. In recent decades, the Taiwanese government started an aboriginal reappreciation program that included the reintroduction of Formosan first languages in Taiwanese schools. However, the results of this initiative have been disappointing.

In 2005, in order to help with the preservation of the languages of the Indigenous people of Taiwan, the council established a Romanized writing system for all of Taiwan's Indigenous languages. The council has also helped with classes and language certification programs for members of the Indigenous community and the non-Formosan Taiwanese to help the conservation movement.

== Classification ==
Formosan languages form nine distinct branches of the Austronesian language family (with all other Malayo-Polynesian languages forming the tenth branch of the Austronesian).

== List of languages ==
It is often difficult to decide where to draw the boundary between a language and a dialect, causing some minor disagreement among scholars regarding the inventory of Formosan languages. There is even more uncertainty regarding possible extinct or assimilated Formosan peoples. Frequently cited examples of Formosan languages are given below, but the list should not be considered exhaustive.

=== Living languages ===
Language	Code	No. of dialects	Dialects	Notes
Amis	ami	5	'Amisay a Pangcah, Siwkolan, Pasawalian, Farangaw, Palidaw	
Atayal	tay	6	Squliq, Skikun, Ts'ole', Ci'uli, Mayrinax, Plngawan	high dialect diversity, sometimes considered separate languages
Bunun	bnn	5	Takitudu, Takibakha, Takivatan, Takbanuaz, Isbukun	high dialect diversity
Kanakanavu	xnb	1		moribund
Kavalan	ckv	1		listed in some sources as moribund, though further analysis may show otherwise
Paiwan	pwn	4	Eastern, Northern, Central, Southern	
Puyuma	pyu	4	Puyuma, Katratripul, Ulivelivek, Kasavakan	
Rukai	dru	6	Ngudradrekay, Taromak Drekay, Teldreka, Thakongadavane, 'Oponoho	
Saaroa	sxr	1		moribund
Saisiyat	xsy	1		
Sakizaya	szy	1		
Seediq	trv	3	Tgdaya, Toda, Truku	
Thao	ssf	1		moribund
Tsou	tsu	1		
Yami/Tao	tao	1		also called Tao. Linguistically, not a member of the "Formosan languages", but a Malayo-Polynesian language.

- Although Yami is geographically in Taiwan, it is not classified as Formosan in linguistics.

=== Extinct languages ===
Language	Code	No. of dialects	Dialects	Extinction date & notes
Basay	byq	1		Mid-20th century
Babuza	bzg	3?	Babuza, Taokas, Favorlang (?).	Late 19th century. Ongoing revival efforts.
Kulon	uon	1		Mid-20th century
Pazeh	pzh	2	Pazeh, Kaxabu	2010. Ongoing revival efforts.
Ketagalan	kae	1		Mid-20th century
Papora	ppu	2?	Papora, Hoanya (?).	
Siraya	fos	2?	Siraya, Makatao (?).	Late 19th century. Ongoing revival efforts.
Taivoan	tvx	1		Late 19th century. Ongoing revival efforts.

== Grammar ==
Verbs typically are not inflected for person or number, but do inflect for tense, mood, voice and aspect. Formosan languages are unusual in their use of the symmetrical voice, in which a noun is marked with the direct case while the verb affix indicates its role in the sentence. This can be seen as a generalisation of the active and passive voices, and is considered a unique morphosyntactic alignment. Furthermore, adverbs are not a unique category of words, but are instead expressed by coverbs.

Nouns are not marked for number and do not have grammatical gender. Noun cases are typically marked by particles rather than inflecting the word itself.

In terms of word order, most Formosan languages display verb-initial word order—VSO (verb-subject-object) or VOS (verb-object-subject)—with the exception of some Northern Formosan languages, such as Thao, Saisiyat, and Pazih, possibly from influence from Chinese.

Li (1998) lists the word orders of several Formosan languages.

- Rukai: VSO, VOS
- Tsou: VOS
- Bunun: VSO
- Atayal: VSO, VOS
- Saisiyat: VS, SVO
- Pazih: VOS, SVO
- Thao: VSO, SVO
- Amis: VOS, VSO
- Kavalan: VOS
- Puyuma: VSO
- Paiwan: VSO, VOS

== Sound changes ==
Tanan Rukai is the Formosan language with the largest number of phonemes with 23 consonants and 4 vowels containing length contrast, while Kanakanavu and Saaroa have the fewest phonemes with 13 consonants and 4 vowels.

=== Wolff ===
The tables below list the Proto-Austronesian reflexes of individual languages given by Wolff (2010).

PAn reflexes in Northwest Formosan languages
Proto-Austronesian	Pazih	Saisiat	Thao	Atayalic
*p	p	p	p	p
*t	t, s	t, s, ʃ	t, θ	t, c (s)
*c	z [dz]	h	t	x, h
*k	k	k	k	k
*q	Ø	ʔ	q	q, ʔ
*b	b	b	f	b-
*d	d	r	s	r
*j	d	r	s	r
*g	k-, -z- [dz], -t	k-, -z- [ð], -z [ð]	k-, -ð-, -ð	k-
*ɣ	x	l [ḷ] (> Ø in Tonghœʔ)	ɬ	ɣ, r, Ø
*m	m	m	m	m
*n	n	n	n	n
*ŋ	ŋ	ŋ	n	ŋ
*s	s	ʃ	ʃ	s
*h	h	h	Ø	h
*l	r	l [ḷ] (> Ø in Tonghœʔ)	r	l
*ɬ	l	ɬ	ð	l
*w	w	w	w	w
*y	y	y	y	y

PAn reflexes in non-Northwest Formosan languages
Proto-Austronesian	Saaroa	Kanakanavu	Rukai	Bunun	Amis	Kavalan	Puyuma	Paiwan
*p	p	p	p	p	p	p	p	p
*t	t, c	t, c	t, c	t	t	t	t, ʈ	tj [č], ts [c]
*c	s, Ø	c	θ, s, Ø	c ([s] in Central & South)	c	s	s	t
*k	k	k	k	k	k	k, q	k	k
*q	Ø	ʔ	Ø	q (x in Ishbukun)	ɦ	Ø	ɦ	q
*b	v	v [β]	b	b	f	b	v [β]	v
*d	s	c	ḍ	d	r	z	d, z	dj [j], z
*j	s	c	d	d	r	z	d, z	dj [j], z
*g	k-, -ɬ-	k-, -l-, -l	g	k-, -Ø-, -Ø	k-, -n-, -n	k-, -n-, -n	h-, -d-, -d	g-, -d-, -d
*ɣ	r	r	r, Ø	l	l [ḷ]	ɣ	r	Ø
*m	m	m	m	m	m	m	m	m
*n	n	n	n	n	n	n	n	n
*ŋ	ŋ	ŋ	ŋ	ŋ	ŋ	ŋ	ŋ	ŋ
*s	Ø	s	s	s	s	Ø	Ø	s
*h	Ø	Ø	Ø	Ø	h	Ø	Ø	Ø
*l	Ø	Ø, l	ñ	h-, -Ø-, -Ø	l [ḷ]	r, ɣ	l [ḷ]	l
*ɬ	ɬ	n	ɬ	n	ɬ	n	ɬ	ɬ
*w	Ø	Ø	v	v	w	w	w	w
*y	ɬ	l	ð	ð	y	y	y	y

PAn reflexes in Malayo-Polynesian languages
Proto-Austronesian	Tagalog	Chamorro	Malay	Old Javanese
*p	p	f	p	p
*t	t	t	t	t
*c	s	s	s	s
*k	k	h	k	k
*q	ʔ	ʔ	h	h
*b	b	p	b, -p	b, w
*d	d-, -l-, -d	h	d, -t	ḍ, r
*j	d-, -l-, -d	ch	j, -t	d
*g	k-, -l-, -d	Ø	d-, -r-, -r	g-, -r-, -r
*ɣ	g	g	r	Ø
*m	m	m	m	m
*n	n	n	n	n
*ŋ	ŋ	ŋ	ŋ	ŋ
*s	h	Ø	h	h
*h	Ø	Ø	Ø	Ø
*l	l	l	l	l
*ɬ	n	ñ, n, l	l-/ñ-, -ñ-/-n-, -n	n
*w	w	w	Ø, w	w
*y	y	y	y	y

=== Blust ===
The following table lists reflexes of Proto-Austronesian *j in various Formosan languages (Blust 2009:572).

Reflexes of Proto-Austronesian *j
Language	Reflex
Tsou	Ø
Kanakanavu	l
Saaroa	ɬ (-ɬ- only)
Puyuma	d
Paiwan	d
Bunun	Ø
Atayal	r (in Squliq), g (sporadic), s (sporadic)
Sediq	y (-y- only), c (-c only)
Pazeh	z ([dz]) (-z- only), d (-d only)
Saisiyat	z ([ð])
Thao	z ([ð])
Amis	n
Kavalan	n
Siraya	n

The following table lists reflexes of Proto-Austronesian *R in various Formosan languages (Blust 2009:582).

Reflexes of Proto-Austronesian *R
Language	Reflex
Paiwan	Ø
Bunun	l
Kavalan	ʀ (contrastive uvular rhotic)
Basay	l
Amis	l
Atayal	g; r (before /i/)
Sediq	r
Pazeh	x
Taokas	l
Thao	lh (voiceless lateral)
Saisiyat	L (retroflex flap)
Bashiic (extra-Formosan)	y

Lenition patterns include (Blust 2009:604-605):

- *b, *d in Proto-Austronesian
  - *b > f, *d > c, r in Tsou
  - *b > v, *d > d in Puyuma
  - *b > v, *d > d, r in Paiwan
  - *b > b, *d > r in Saisiyat
  - *b > f, *d > s in Thao
  - *b > v, *d > r in Yami (extra-Formosan)

== Distributions ==
=== Gallery ===
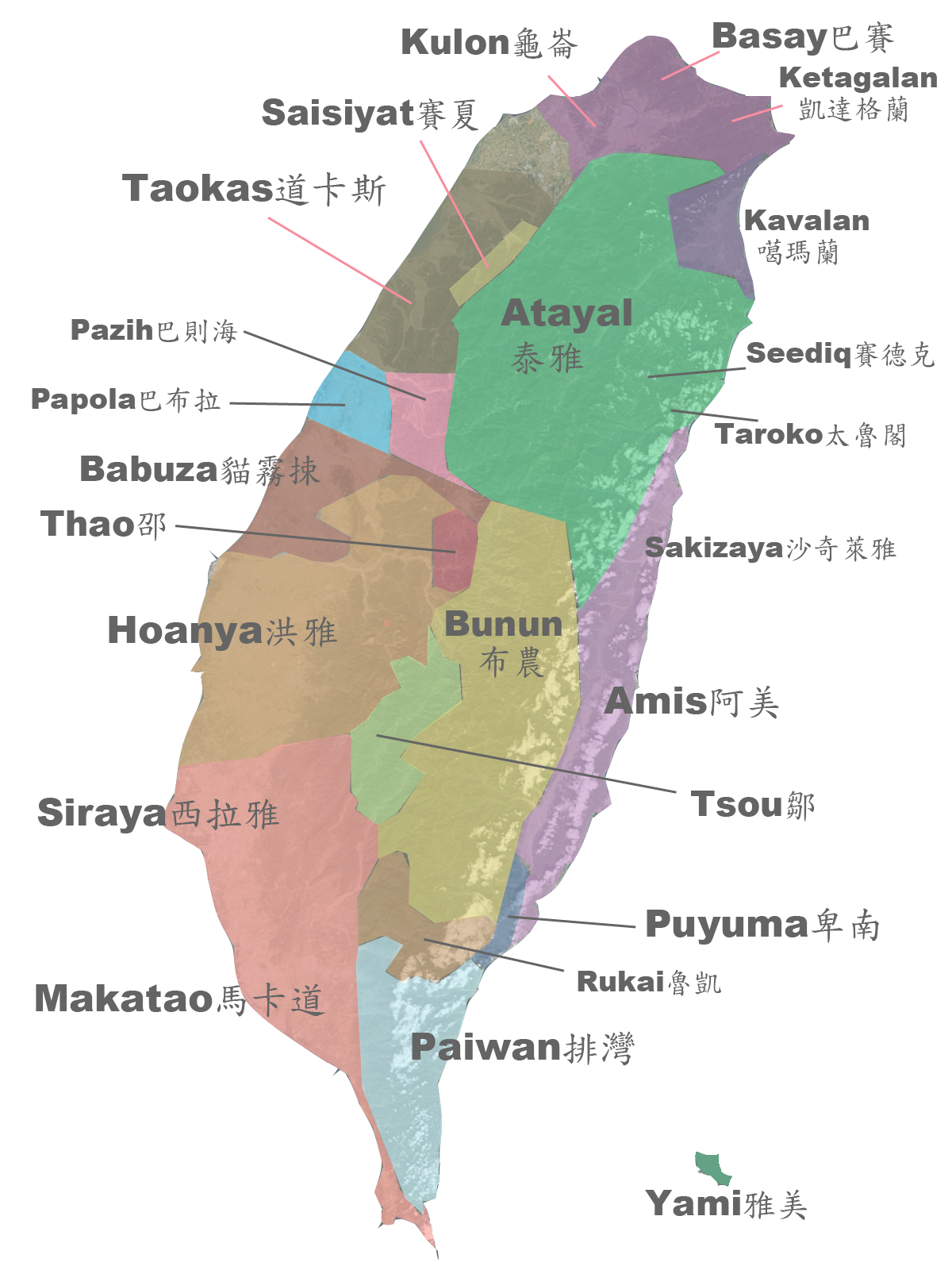
The Formosan languages

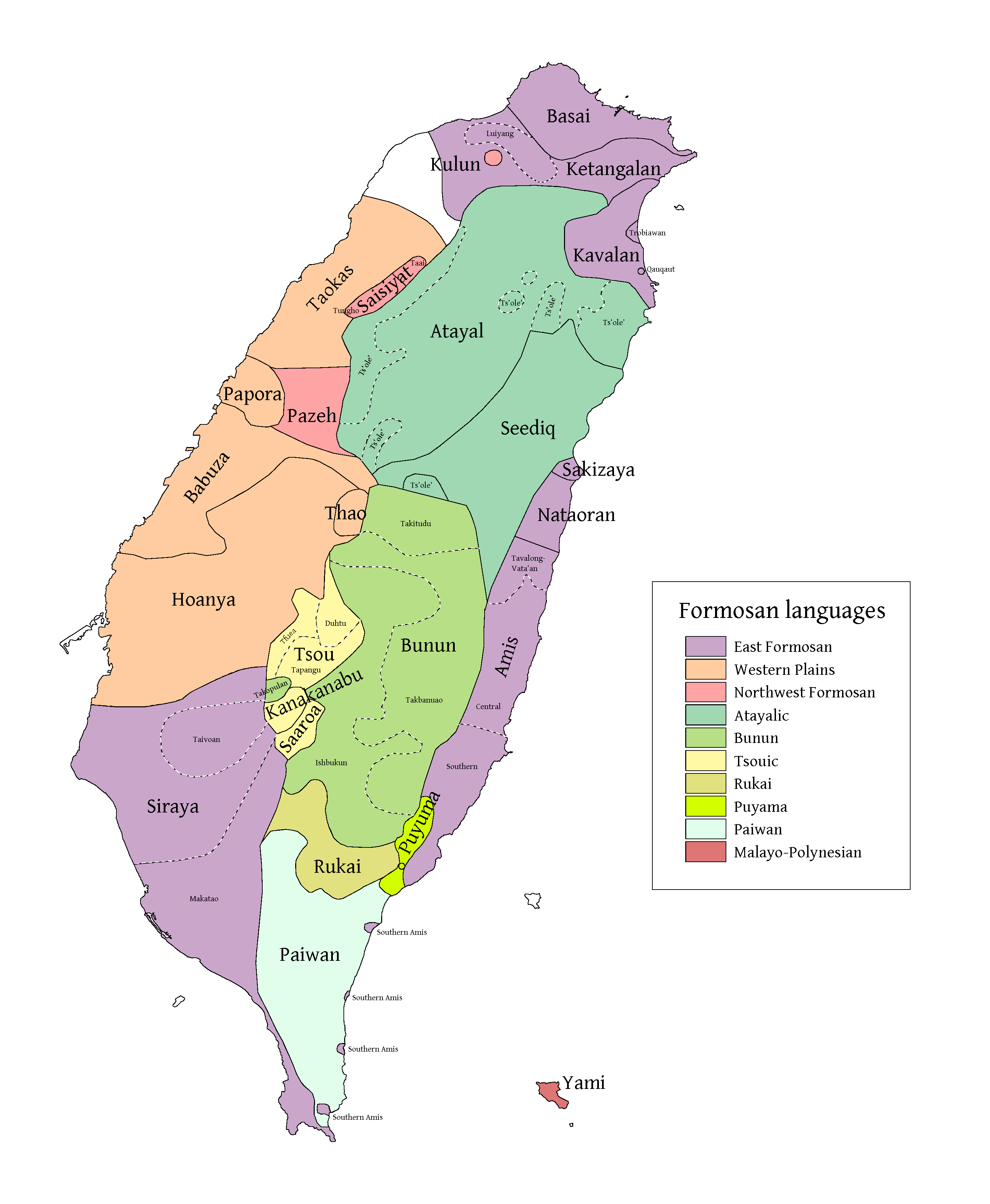
The Formosan languages, per Blust (1999)

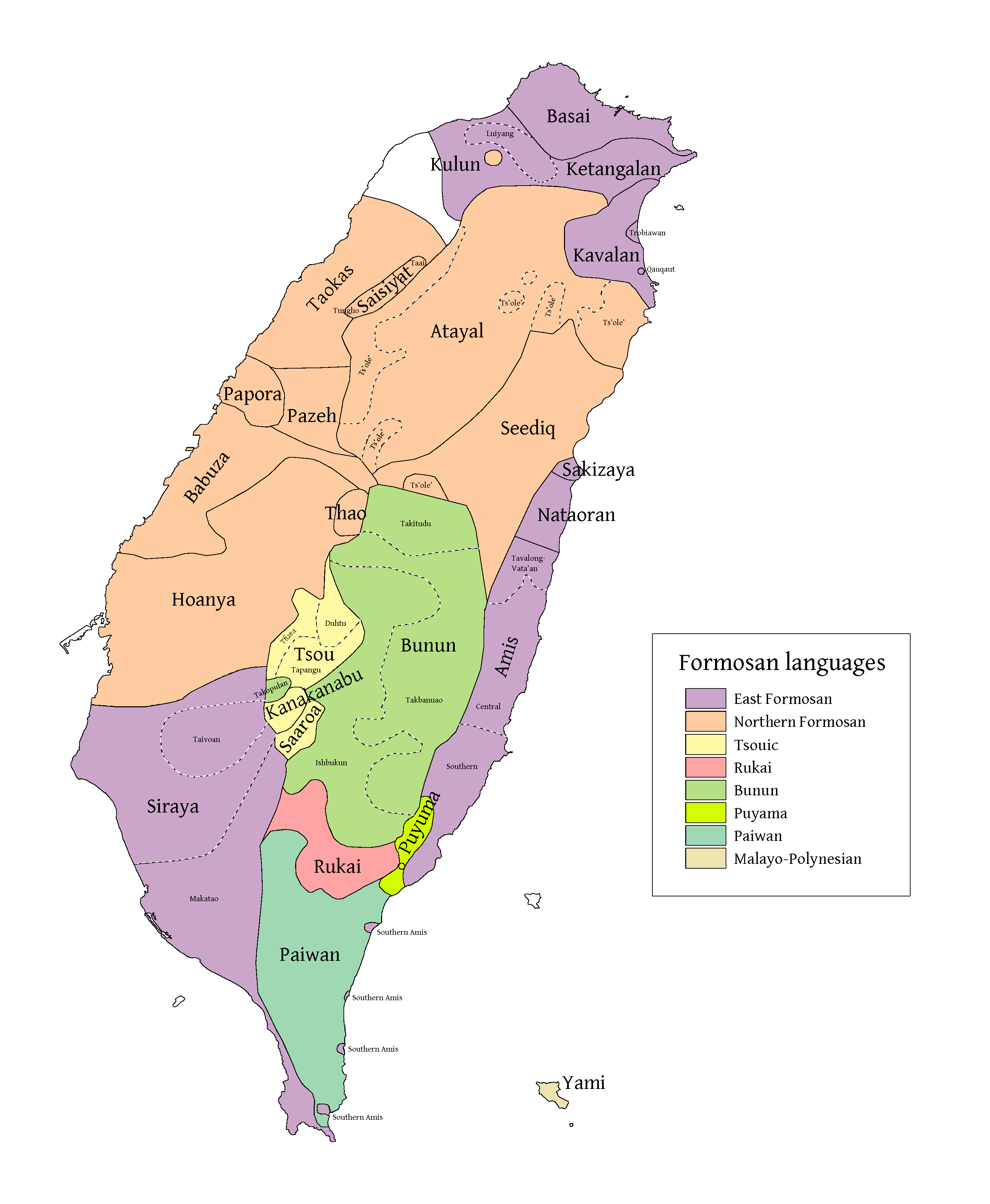
The Formosan languages, per Li (2008)

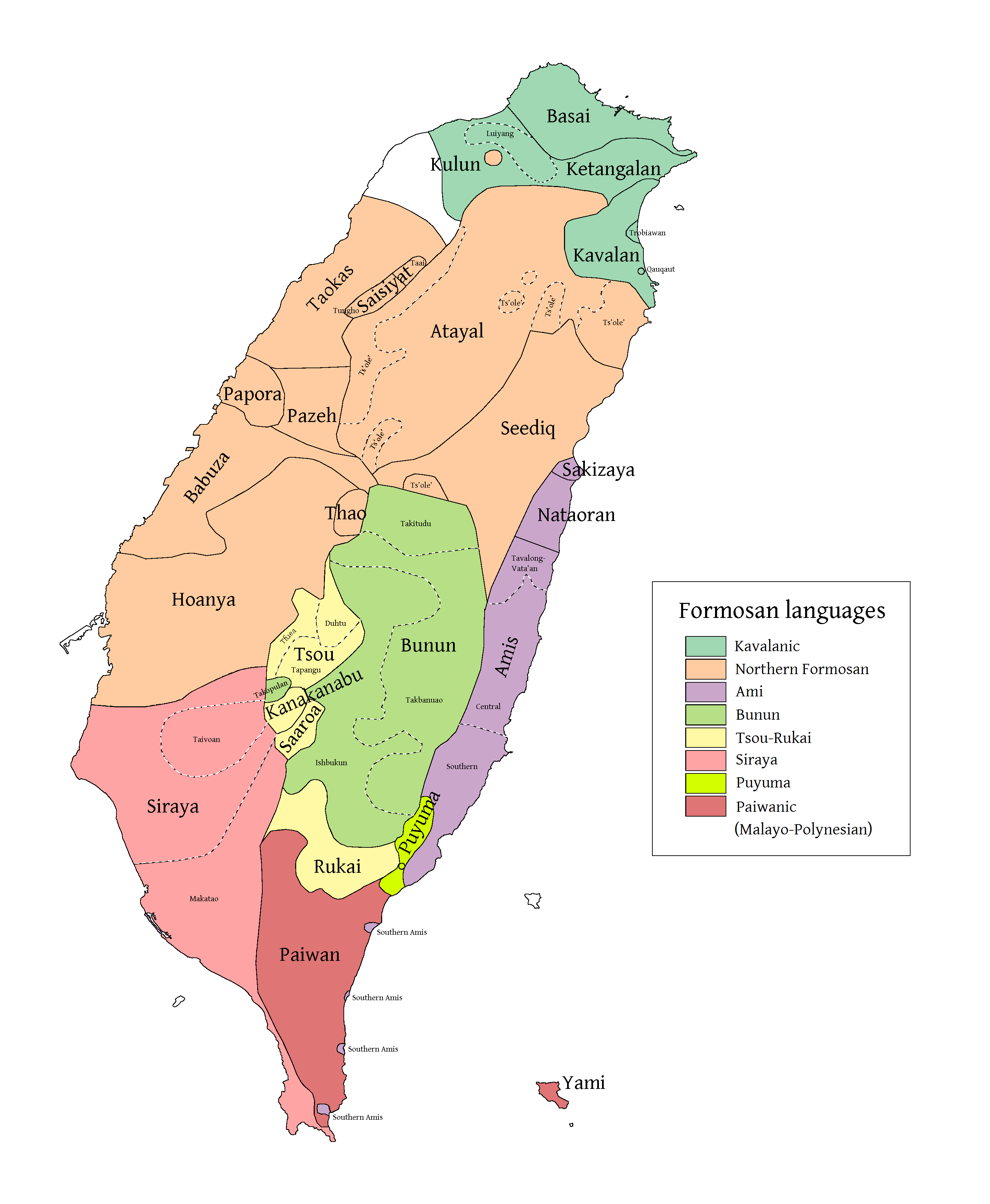
The Formosan languages, per the Austronesian Basic Vocabulary Database (Greenhill, Blust & Gray 2008).

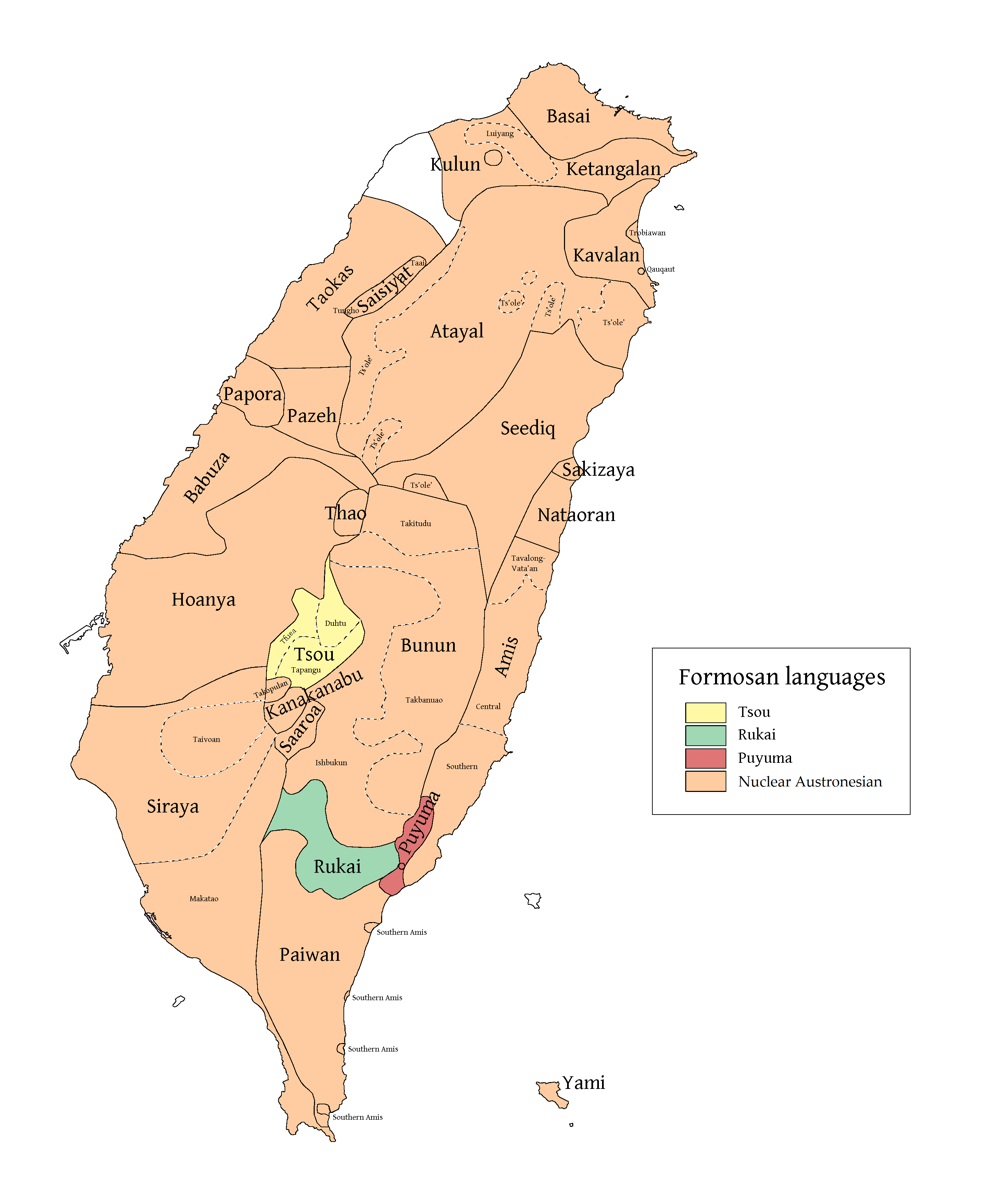
The Formosan languages, per Ross (2009)

=== Information ===
Li (2001) lists the geographical homelands for the following Formosan languages.

- Tsou: southwestern parts of central Taiwan; Yushan (oral traditions)
- Saisiyat and Kulon: somewhere between Tatu River and Tachia River not far from the coast
- Thao: Choshui River
- Qauqaut: mid-stream of Takiri River (Liwuhsi in Chinese)
- Siraya: Chianan Plains
- Makatau: Pingtung
- Bunun: Hsinyi (信義鄉) in Nantou County
- Paiwan: Ailiao River, near the foot of the mountains

== See also ==
- Cognate sets for Formosan languages (Wiktionary)
- Demographics of Indigenous Taiwanese
- Writing systems of Formosan languages
- Personal pronoun systems of Formosan languages
- Fossilized affixes in Austronesian languages
- Proto-Austronesian language
- Sinckan Manuscripts
- Naming customs of Taiwanese Indigenous peoples
