= 1977 Andorran parliamentary election =

- 14 December 1977
- 12 of the 24 seats in the General Council
Party	Vote %	Seats	+/–
Independents	100	12	0
This lists parties that won seats. See the complete results below.

Parliamentary elections were held in Andorra on 14 December 1977 to elect half of the members of the General Council.

The elections were held alongside local elections.

== Electoral system ==
Each parish had four seats in the General Council. The seats were elected on a staggered basis, with two members elected from each parish every two years. In Andorra la Vella parish, two members represented the town of Andorra la Vella and two represented Les Escaldes, with one member elected from each every two years.

All candidates had to run on lists of candidates, although voters could split their votes between candidates on different lists. Any candidate receiving a majority of the vote was elected in the first round. If there were remaining seats to fill, a second round was held, in which candidates had to receive a majority of the vote to be elected. If there were still remaining seats to fill, a third round would be held in which the candidate(s) with the most votes would be elected.

== Candidates ==
Constituency	List	Candidates
Andorra la Vella	A	Albert Font
Andorra la Vella	B	Amadeu Rossell
Canillo	A	Jordi Font; Josep Farré
Canillo	B	Albert Torres; Bonaventura Bonell
Encamp	A	Pere Torres; Enric Torres
Encamp	B	Serafí Reig; Gil Torres
Encamp	C	Enric París; Antoni Arias
La Massana	A	Guillem Areny; Bonaventura Mora
La Massana	B	Bonaventura Mora; Càndid Naudi
Les Escaldes	A	Josep Serra
Les Escaldes	B	Miquel Vidal
Ordino	A	Joaquim de Riba; Isidre Baró
Ordino	B	Guillem Benazet; Simó Duró
Ordino	C	Josep Riba; Isidre Baró
Sant Julià de Lòria	A	Francesc Roca; Ricard Tor
Sant Julià de Lòria	B	Josep Miño; Miquel Vila
Source: La Vanguardia, Avui

== Results ==
Party	Votes	%	Seats
Independents			12
Total			12
Total votes	2,580	–	
Registered voters/turnout	3,211	80.35	
Source: La Vanguardia, Avui

=== Elected members ===
Constituency	Elected members
Andorra la Vella	Amadeu Rossell
Canillo	Bonaventura Bonelll
Canillo	Albert Torres
Encamp	Serafí Reig
Encamp	Gil Torres
La Massana	Guillem Areny
La Massana	Bonaventura Mora
Les Escaldes	Miquel Vidal
Ordino	Guillem Benazet
Ordino	Simó Duró
Sant Julià de Lòria	Josep Miño
Sant Julià de Lòria	Miquel Vila
Source: La Vanguardia, Avui

== Aftermath ==
The number of parishes was increased from six to seven in 1978 with the creation of Escaldes-Engordany, which was split out of Andorra la Vella. Supplementary elections were held to elect an additional four members, two from Andorra la Vella and two from Escaldes-Engordany.
