= Pazeh–Kaxabu language =

Northwest Formosan language of Taiwan

Pazeh–Kaxabu
- Pazih, Pazéh
- Native to: Taiwan
- Ethnicity: Pazeh people, Kaxabu people
- Extinct: 2010, with the death of Pan Jin-yu (Pazeh); 12 (2013, Kaxabu dialect)
- Revival: 2010s
- Language family: Austronesian: Northwest Formosan; Pazeh–Kaxabu
- Dialects: Pazeh †; Kaxabu

Language codes
- ISO 639-3: pzh
- Glottolog: kulo1237
- ELP: Pazeh-Kaxabu
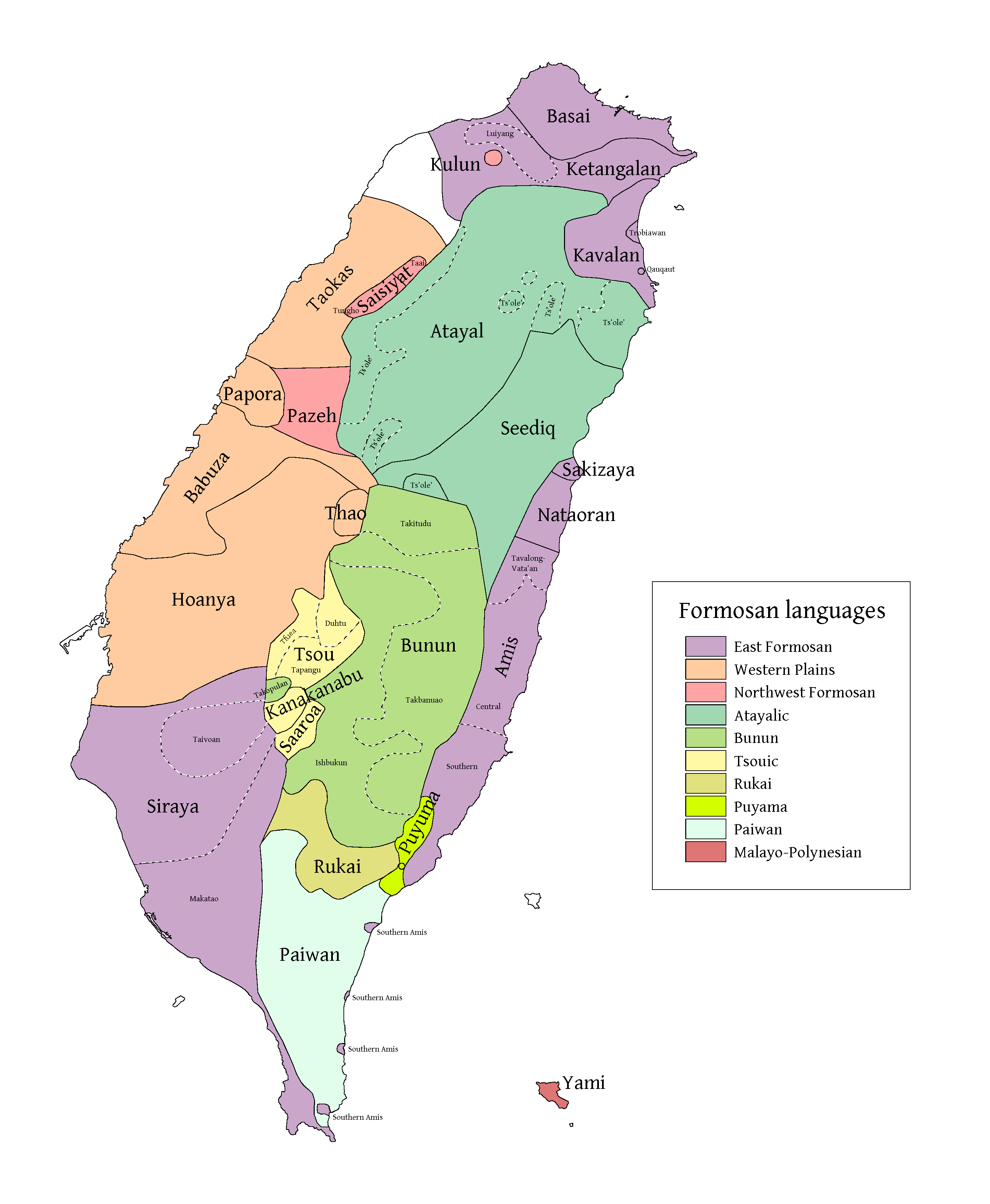
- (pink, northwest) Saisiyat, Pazeh and Kulon. Some Chinese-language sources designate the white area in the northwest as a Kulon area, as opposed to the small pink circle on this map.

Pazeh (also spelled Pazih, Pazéh) and Kaxabu are dialects of a Formosan language of the Austronesian language family. It is the original language of the Pazeh and Kaxabu, neighboring Taiwanese indigenous peoples. The last remaining native speaker of the Pazeh dialect died in 2010, but 12 speakers of Kaxabu remain in Puli Township, Nantou County.

== Classification ==
Pazeh and Kaxabu are classified as a Formosan language of the Austronesian language family.

=== Sound changes ===
The Pazih language merged the following Proto-Austronesian phonemes (Li 2001:7).

1. *C, *S > s
2. *D, *Z > d
3. *k, *g > k
4. *j, *s > z
5. *S_{2}, *H > h
6. *N, *ñ > l
7. *r, *R > x

Pazih also split some Proto-Austronesian phonemes:

1. *S > s (merged with *C); *S_{2}, *H > h
2. *w > ø, w
3. *e > e, u

== History ==
Due to prejudice faced by the Pazeh, as well as other indigenous groups of Taiwan, Hoklo Taiwanese came to displace Pazeh.

The last remaining native speaker of the Pazeh dialect, Pan Jin-yu, died in 2010 at the age of 96. Before her death, she offered Pazeh classes to about 200 regular students in Puli and a small number of students in Miaoli and Taichung. However, there are still efforts in revival of the language after her death.

== Phonology ==
Pazeh has 17 consonants, 4 vowels, and 4 diphthongs (-ay, -aw, -uy, -iw).

Consonants
	Labial	Coronal^{1}	Palatal	Velar	Glottal
Nasal	m	n		ŋ	
Stop	p b	t d		k ɡ^{3}	(ʔ)^{2}
Fricative		s z^{4}		x	h^{5}
Rhotic		ɾ			
Approximant		l	j	w	

1. /t/ and /d/ do not actually share the same place of articulation; /d/ is alveolar or prealveolar and /t/ (as well as /n/) is interdental. Other coronal consonants tend to be prealveolar or post-dental.
2. The distribution for the glottal stop is allophonic, appearing only between like vowels, before initial vowels, and after final vowels. It is also largely absent in normal speech
3. /ɡ/ is spirantized intervocalically
4. /z/ is actually an alveolar/prealveolar affricate [dz] and only occurs as a syllable onset.
5. /h/ varies between glottal and pharyngeal realizations ([ħ]) and is sometimes difficult to distinguish from /x/

Although Pazeh contrasts voiced and voiceless obstruents, this contrast is neutralized in final position for labial and velar stops, where only /p/ and /k/ occur respectively (/d/ is also devoiced but a contrast is maintained). /l/ and /n/ are also neutralized to the latter. Voiceless stops are unreleased in final position.

Vowels
	Front	Central	Back
Close	i		u
Mid		ə	
Open		a	

Mid vowels ([ɛ] and [o]) occur as allophones of close vowels (/i/ and /u/ respectively).

- Both lower when adjacent to /h/.
- /u/ lowers before /ŋ/. [u] and [o] are in free variation before /ɾ/
- Reduplicated morphemes carry the phonetic vowel even when the reduplicated vowel is not in the phonological context for lowering.
  - /mutapitapih/ → [mu.ta.pɛ.taˈpɛh] ('keep clapping').

/a/ is somewhat advanced and raised when adjacent to /i/. Prevocally, high vowels are semivocalized. Most coronal consonants block this, although it still occurs after /s/. Semivowels also appear post-vocally.

=== Phonotactics ===
The most common morpheme structure is CVCVC where C is any consonant and V is any vowel. Consonant clusters are rare and consist only of a nasal plus a homorganic obstruent or the glide element of a diphthong.

Intervocalic voiceless stops are voiced before a morpheme boundary (but not following one) . Stress falls on the ultimate syllable.

== Grammar ==
Like Bunun, Seediq, Squliq Atayal, Mantauran Rukai, and the Tsouic languages, Pazeh does not distinguish between common nouns and personal names, whereas Saisiyat does (Li 2000). Although closely related to Saisiyat, the Pazeh language does not have the infix -um- that is present in Saisiyat.

=== Morphology ===
Pazeh makes ready use of affixes, infixes, suffixes, and circumfixes, as well as reduplication. Pazeh also has "focus-marking" in its verbal morphology. In addition, verbs can be either stative or dynamic.

There are four types of focus in Pazeh (Li 2000).

1. Agent-focus (AF): mu-, me-, mi-, m-, ma-, ∅-
2. Patient-focus (PF) -en, -un
3. Locative-focus (LF): -an
4. Referential-focus (RF): sa-, saa-, si-

The following affixes are used in Pazeh verbs (Li 2000).

- -in- 'perfective'
- -a- 'progressive'
- -ay 'actor focus, irrealis', -aw 'patient focus, irrealis'
- -i 'non-agent-focused imperative'

The following are also used to mark aspect (Li 2000).

- Reduplication of the verb stem's first syllable – 'progressive'
- lia – "already"

=== Affixes ===
The Pazih affixes below are from Li (2001:10–19).

Prefixes

- ha-: stative
- ka-: inchoative
- kaa-: nominal
- kai-: to stay at a certain location
- kali- -an: susceptible to, involuntarily
- m-: agent focus
- ma- (ka-): stative
- ma- (pa-): to have (noun); agent-focus
- maa[ka]- (paa[ka]-): – mutually, reciprocal
- maka- (paka-): to bear, bring forth
- mana- (pana-): to wash (body parts)
- mari- (pari-): to bear, to give birth (of animal)
- maru- (paru-): to lay eggs or give birth
- masa-: verbal prefix
- masi- (pasi-): to move, to wear
- mata-: (number of) times
- mati- (pati-): to carry, to wear, to catch
- matu- (patu-): to build, erect, set up
- maxa- (paxa-): to produce, to bring forth; to become
- maxi- (paxi-): to have, to bring forth; to look carefully
- me-, mi- (pi-), mi- (i-): agent-focus
- mia- (pia-): towards, to go
- mia- which one; ordinal (number)
- mu- (pu-): agent-focus (-um- in many other Formosan languages); to release
- pa-: verbalizer; causative, active verb
- paka-: causative, stative verb
- papa-: to ride
- pu-: to pave
- pu- -an: locative-focus, location
- sa- ~saa-, si-: instrumental-focus, something used to ..., tools
- si-: to have, to produce; to go (to a location)
- si- -an: to bring forth, to have a growth on one's body
- ta-: agentive, one specialized in ...; nominal prefix; verbal prefix
- tau-: agentive
- tau- -an: a gathering place
- taxa-: to feel like doing; to take a special posture
- taxi-: to lower one's body
- taxu-: to move around
- ti-: to get something undesirable or uncomfortable
- tu-: stative
- xi-: to turn over, to revert

Infixes

- -a-: progressive, durative
- -in-: perfective

Suffixes

- -an: locative-focus, location
- -an ~ -nan: locative pronoun or personal name
- -aw: patient-focus, future
- -ay: locative-focus, irrealis
- -en ~ -un: patient-focus
- -i: patient-focus, imperative; vocative, address for an elder kinship
- CV- -an: location

=== Syntax ===
Although originally a verb-initial language, Pazeh often uses SVO (verb-medial) sentence constructions due to influence from Chinese.

There are four case markers in Pazeh (Li 2000).

1. ki Nominative
2. ni Genitive
3. di Locative
4. u Oblique

Pazeh has the following negators (Li 2001:46).

- ini – no, not
- uzay – not
- kuang ~ kuah – not exist
- mayaw – not yet
- nah – not want
- ana – don't

=== Pronouns ===
The Pazeh personal pronouns below are from Li (2000). (Note: vis. = visible, prox. = proximal)

Pazeh Personal Pronouns
Type of Pronoun	Neutral	Nominative	Genitive	Locative
1s.	yaku	aku	naki	yakuan, yakunan
2s.	isiw	siw	nisiw	isiwan
3s. (prox.)	imini	mini	nimini	iminiyan
3s. (vis.)	imisiw	misiw	nimisiw	misiwan
3s. (not vis.)	isia	sia	nisia	isiaan
1p. (incl.)	ita	ta	nita (ta-)	itaan
1p. (excl.)	yami	ami	nyam(i)	yamian, yaminan
2p.	imu	mu	nimu	imuan
3p. (prox.)	yamini	amini	naamini	yaminiyan
3p. (vis.)	yamisiw	amisiw	naamisiw	yamisiwan
3p. (not vis.)	yasia	asia	naasia	yasiaan

== Vocabulary ==
=== Numerals ===
Pazeh and Saisiyat are the only Formosan languages that do not have a bipartite numerical system consisting of both human and non-human numerals (Li 2006). Pazeh is also the only language that forms the numerals 6 to 9 by addition (However, Saisiyat, which is closely related to Pazeh, expresses the number 7 as 6 + 1, and 9 as 10 − 1.)

- 1 = ida adang
- 2 = dusa
- 3 = turu
- 4 = supat
- 5 = xasep
- 6 = 5 + 1 = xaseb-uza
- 7 = 5 + 2 = xaseb-i-dusa
- 8 = 5 + 3 = xaseb-i-turu
- 9 = 5 + 4 = xaseb-i-supat

The number "five" in Pazeh, xasep, is similar to Saisiyat Laseb, Taokas hasap, Babuza nahup, and Hoanya hasip (Li 2006). Li (2006) believes that the similarity is more likely because of borrowing rather than common origin. Laurent Sagart considers these numerals to be ancient retentions from Proto-Austronesian, but Paul Jen-kuei Li considers them to be local innovations. Unlike Pazeh, these Plains indigenous languages as well as the Atayalic languages use 2 × 4 to express the number 8. (The Atayalic languages as well as Thao also use 2 × 3 to express the number 6.) Saisiyat, Thao, Taokas, and Babuza use 10 − 1 to express 9, whereas Saisiyat uses 5 + 1 to express 6 as Pazeh does. The Ilongot language of the Philippines also derives numerals in the same manner as Pazeh does (Blust 2009:273).

Furthermore, numerals can function as both nouns and verbs in all Formosan languages, including Pazeh.

== Bibliography ==
- Blust, Robert (1999). "Notes on Pazeh Phonology and Morphology". Oceanic Linguistics. 38 (2): 321–365. doi:10.1353/ol.1999.0002. S2CID 145426312.
