= Harvest Festival (disambiguation) =

A harvest festival is an annual celebration that occurs around the time of the main harvest of a given region. "Harvest festival" or "Harvest Festival" may also refer to:

- Harvest Festival (United Kingdom)
- Thanksgiving, harvest festival in the United States, Canada, and other countries
- Harvest Festival (Taiwan)
  - Ami’s Harvest Festival, celebrated by Ami ethnic group in Taiwan
- Harvest Festival (Parks and Recreation), an episode of Parks and Recreation
- Aktion Erntefest ("Operation Harvest Festival"), Nazi murder of 43,000 Jews on 2–3 November 1943
