= Sakizaya =

Sakizaya may refer to:

- Sakizaya language, a Formosan language
- Sakizaya people, an ethnic group of Taiwan
