= Yang Sen (baseball) =

Taiwanese baseball player

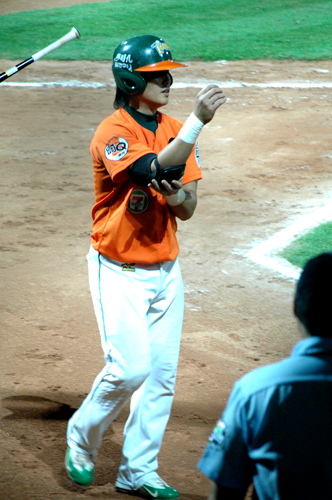
- Second baseman
- Born: 25 March 1981 (age 45)
- Batted: Left Threw: Right

CPBL debut
- March 3, 2004, for the Uni-President Lions

Last CPBL appearance
- July 22, 2010, for the Uni-President Lions

Career statistics
- Batting average: .285
- Home runs: 23
- Runs batted in: 260
- Stats at Baseball Reference

Teams
- Uni-President Lions (2004–2010)

Career highlights and awards
- CPBL hits leaer (2005); CPBL stolen bases leader (2005)
Medals
Representing Chinese Taipei
Men's baseball
Baseball World Cup
Bronze medal – third place	2001 Taipei	Team
Asian Baseball Championship
Bronze medal – third place	2007 Taichung	Team

Yang Sen (Chinese: 陽森; pinyin: Yáng Sēn; Wade–Giles: Yang Sen; born 25 March 1981) is a Taiwanese baseball player who has played for Uni-President Lions of the Chinese Professional Baseball League. He played second base for the Lions.

== Personal life ==
He was married to a former member of Taiwan National Women's Football Team, they had a son named Yang Hao. They have since divorced. He is a descendant of the Pacidal clan of Amis tribe, a tribe of the Taiwanese Aborigines. The name Pacidal means the Sun in Amis language, and has the same meaning as Han family name Yang (Chinese: 陽).
