= Sanxiantai =

Area in Chenggong, Taitung County, Taiwan

Sanxiantai 三仙臺
- Beach
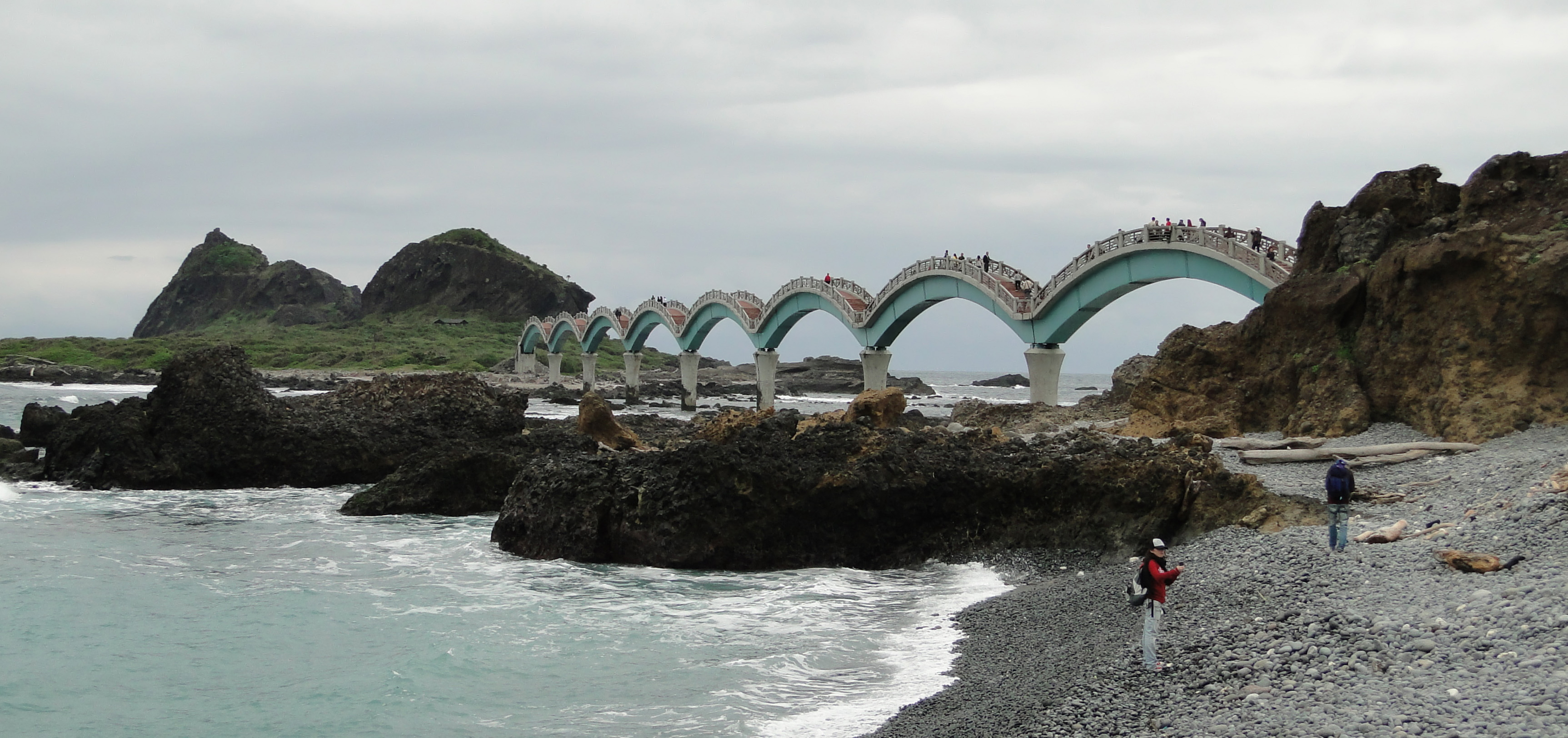
- Footbridge at Sanxiantai

- Location within Taiwan
- Coordinates: 23°07′29″N 121°24′59″E
- Location: Taitung County, Taiwan

Sanxiantai (Amis: nuwalian; Chinese: 三仙臺; pinyin: Sānxiāntái) is an area containing a beach and several islands located on the coast of Chenggong Township, Taitung County, Taiwan. The beach stretches for ten kilometers in length. It is situated at the 112-kilometer mark. A popular tourist attraction for its rocky coastal views, the area is well known for its long footbridge in the shape of a sea dragon that connects the coast to the largest island. It appears on a map dated 1755 as "Sansana".

== Overview ==
Sanxiantai means "Platform of the three immortals". Sanxiantai Island has three extremely large rocks on the island. Sanxiantai Island has a unique shape. The area is best known for its long footbridge that connects the eastern coast of the main Island of Taiwan with the outer Island of Sanxiantai.

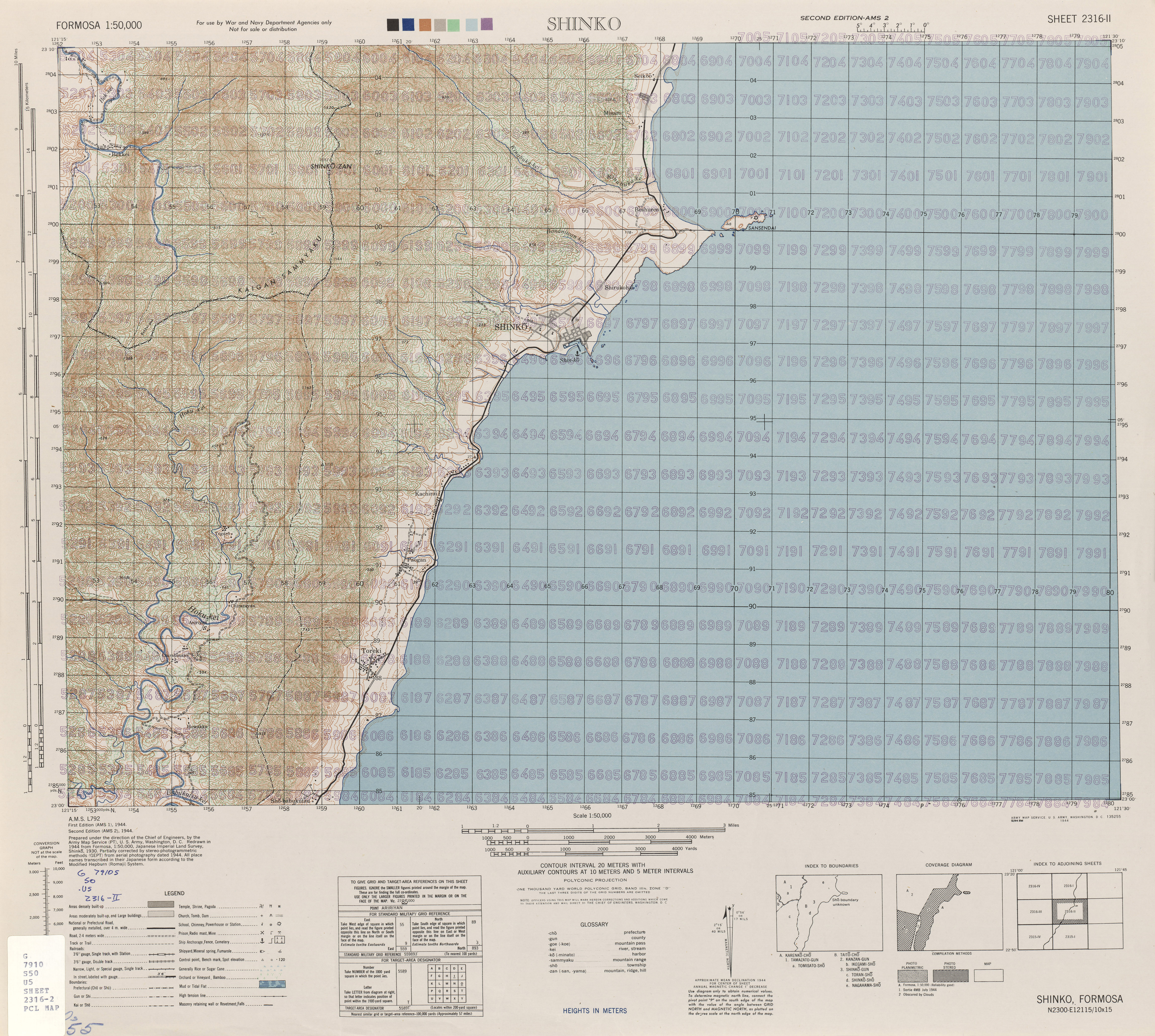
Map including Sanxiantai (labeled as SANSENDAI) (1944)

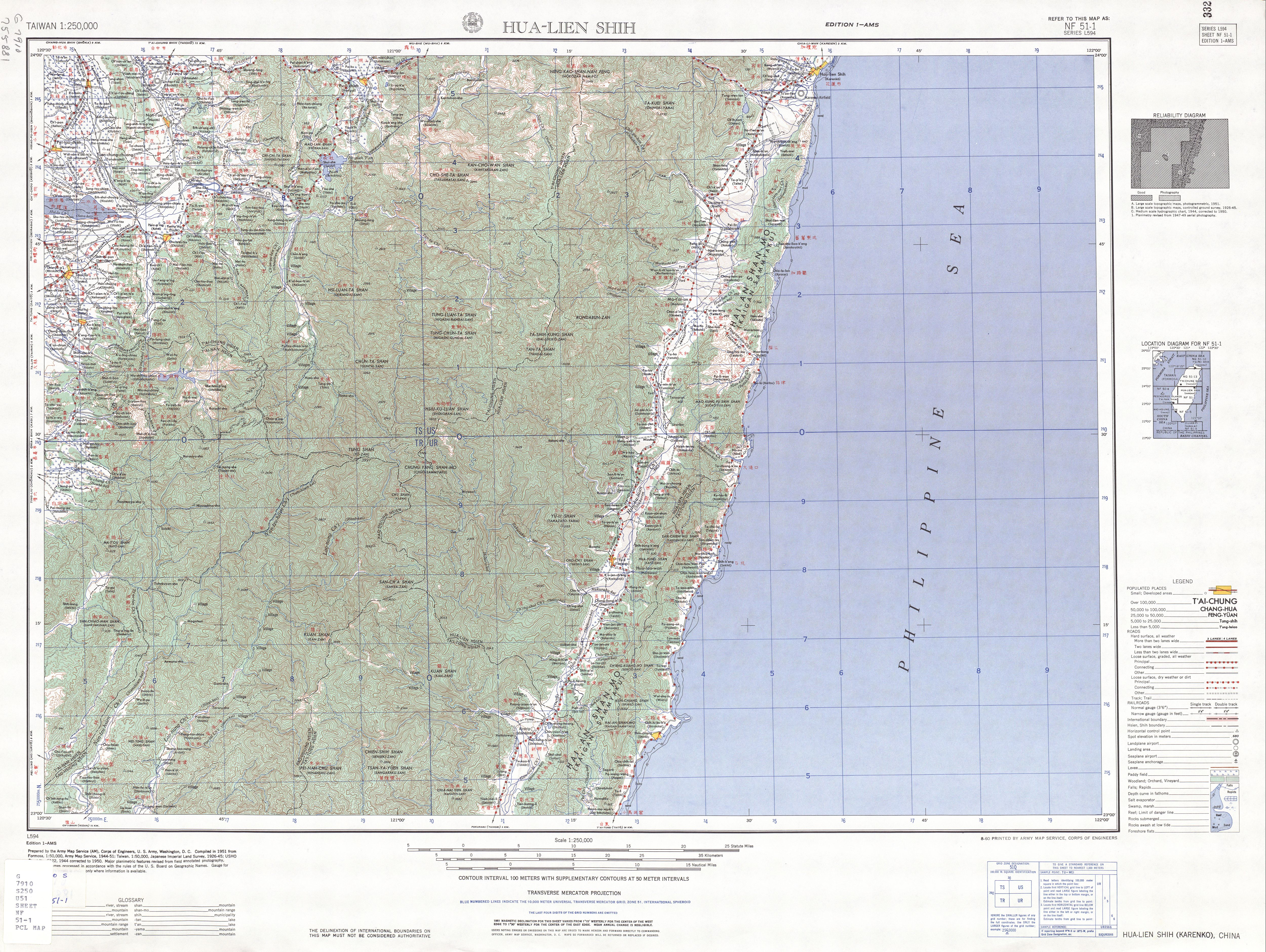
Map of the region including Sanxiantai (unlabeled) (1951)

== See also ==
- List of islands of Taiwan
