= Szy =

Szy may refer to:

- szy, the ISO 639-3 language code for the Sakizaya language
- SZY, the IATA code for Olsztyn-Mazury Airport, Poland
