= Rat control in Alberta =

Rodent infestation control

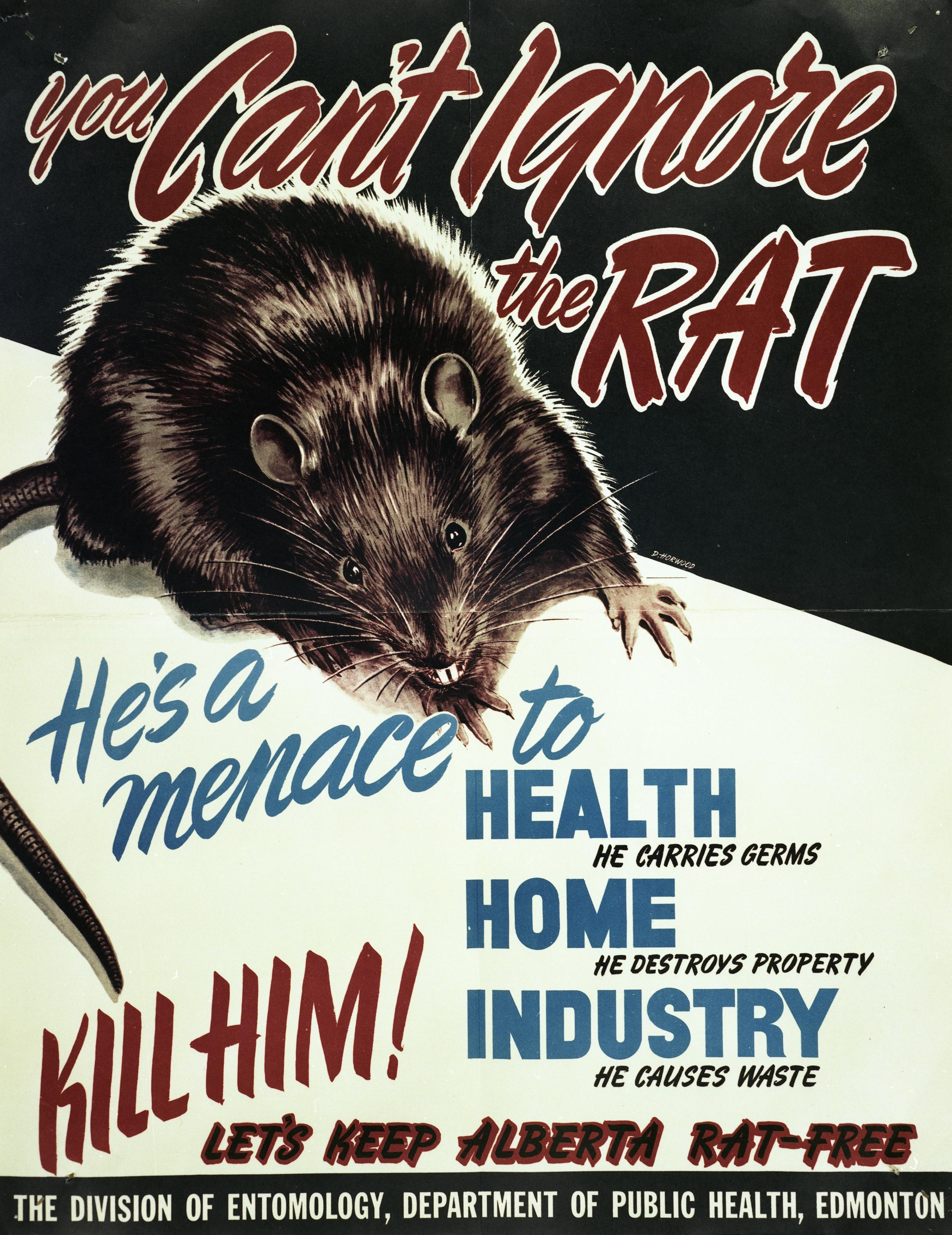
Poster from the Alberta Department of Public Health

Since the mid-20th century, the Canadian province of Alberta has maintained an essentially rat-free status through a rigorous rat control program. Alberta is bounded by the Rocky Mountains to the west, boreal forest to the north, and with long treeless prairie and semi-arid regions to the south. The most feasible point of rat entry has historically been its eastern border with the neighboring province of Saskatchewan. Norway rats (Rattus norvegicus) are invasive rodents known for spreading disease and damaging crops and property. They had been advancing across the Prairies and reached Alberta's eastern border in 1950. Faced with the risk of plague and agricultural losses, the provincial government immediately declared rats an agricultural pest and waged a war on rats. On September 24, 2026, a dead rat was discovered in Bowden, Alberta.

== Background ==
Norway rats are highly destructive; they consume and contaminate stored grains and feed, gnaw tunnels and holes in buildings and equipment, and can transmit diseases via fleas and contamination. Alberta's rural economy relies on secure grain storage and livestock feed, and even a small rat infestation can pose a major threat. To prevent this, Alberta's 1942 Agricultural Pests Act gave power to the government to declare such pests and mandate their control. In 1950, rats were declared a pest under this Act, triggering aggressive eradication efforts.
