= Grain borer =

Grain borer may refer to:

- Prostephanus truncatus, larger grain borer
- Rhyzopertha dominica, lesser grain borer or stored grain borer
