= Harvest Festival (Taiwan) =

The Harvest Festival, also known as the Harvest Ceremony, is celebrated in Taiwan among July, August and September annually. The ceremony lasts about seven days. Due to the different living environment and planting crops among each ethnic group, the time for them to harvest crops is different as well. However, from the beginning of reaping to the ending of storing the crops, each ethnic group will hold the similar ceremony to show their respect to their ancestors and gods, to pray that the crops can be gathered successfully in this year and to wish that they will produce good harvests, and men and livestock will be flourishing in next year. After finishing the activities of the ritual, people will gather together for dinner, dancing, setting a campfire party and playing games.
