= Chief Industries =

American corporation

- Company type: Private
- Founded: 1954
- Founder: Virgil Eihusen
- Headquarters: Grand Island, Nebraska
- Key people: DJ Eihusen (CEO) Dave Ostdiek (CFO)
- Number of employees: 1400+
- Website: chiefind.com

Chief Industries is a privately held, family-owned corporation headquartered in Grand Island, Nebraska. Founded in 1954 by Virgil Eihusen, the company deals in multiple industries, including agriculture, construction, steel fabrication, ethanol production, transportation, metal building manufacturing, and modular housing

== Overview ==
Chief Industries was founded in 1954 when Virgil Eihusen launched a residential construction company in his garage in Grand Island, Nebraska. in 1993, Robert Eihusen became the CEO until 2010. Since then, DJ Eihusen has been leading the company. Chief Industries expanded into agricultural storage solutions with the creation of Chief Agri in 1961 and metal building systems with Chief Buildings in 1966.

In 1968, Chief Industries underwent significant growth, including opening facilities in Fort Dodge and Rensselaer and rebranding to Chief Industries. Over the next decades, Chief Industries expanded its operations to include modular housing (BonnaVilla, 1970), transportation services (Chief Carriers, 1973), ethanol production (Chief Ethanol Fuels, 1990), and steel fabrication (Chief Fabrication, 1984).

== Operations and subsidiaries ==
=== Chief Agri ===
Founded in 1961, Chief Agri manufactures grain storage and handling equipment for agricultural producers worldwide. The brand operates in the United States, Europe, South America, Africa, Australia, and Asia.

=== Chief Buildings ===
Established in 1966, Chief Buildings focuses on manufacturing non-residential metal building systems. Its facilities are located in Nebraska, Iowa, Alabama, South Carolina, and Indiana.

=== BonnaVilla ===
BonnaVilla, founded in 1970, produces modular homes in a range of customizable floor plans. Homes are manufactured in a controlled environment, ensuring year-round production.

=== Chief Carriers ===
Since 1973, Chief Carriers has provided trucking and logistics services, specializing in flatbed, dry van and oversized freight across the United States and Canada.

=== Chief Ethanol Fuels ===
Chief Ethanol Fuels operates Nebraska's first dry-mill ethanol plant. Established in 1990, it processes over 40 million bushels of corn annually to produce renewable fuel, distiller grains, and corn oil.

=== Chief Fabrication ===
Founded in 1984, Chief Fabrication is a steel fabrication company providing services such as welding, CNC punching, and stamping for various industries.

=== Chief Construction ===
The original business unit, Chief Construction, offers design-build, construction management, and general contracting services.

== Awards and recognition ==
- 1968: Partners in Progress Award, Grand Island Chamber of Commerce
- 1968: Small Businessman of the Year, Small Business Administration
- 2023: Richard Good Distinguished Service Award, Grand Island Chamber of Commerce
