= Chenggong Fish Harbor =

Harbor in Chenggong, Taitung County, Taiwan

Chenggong Fish Harbor 成功漁港
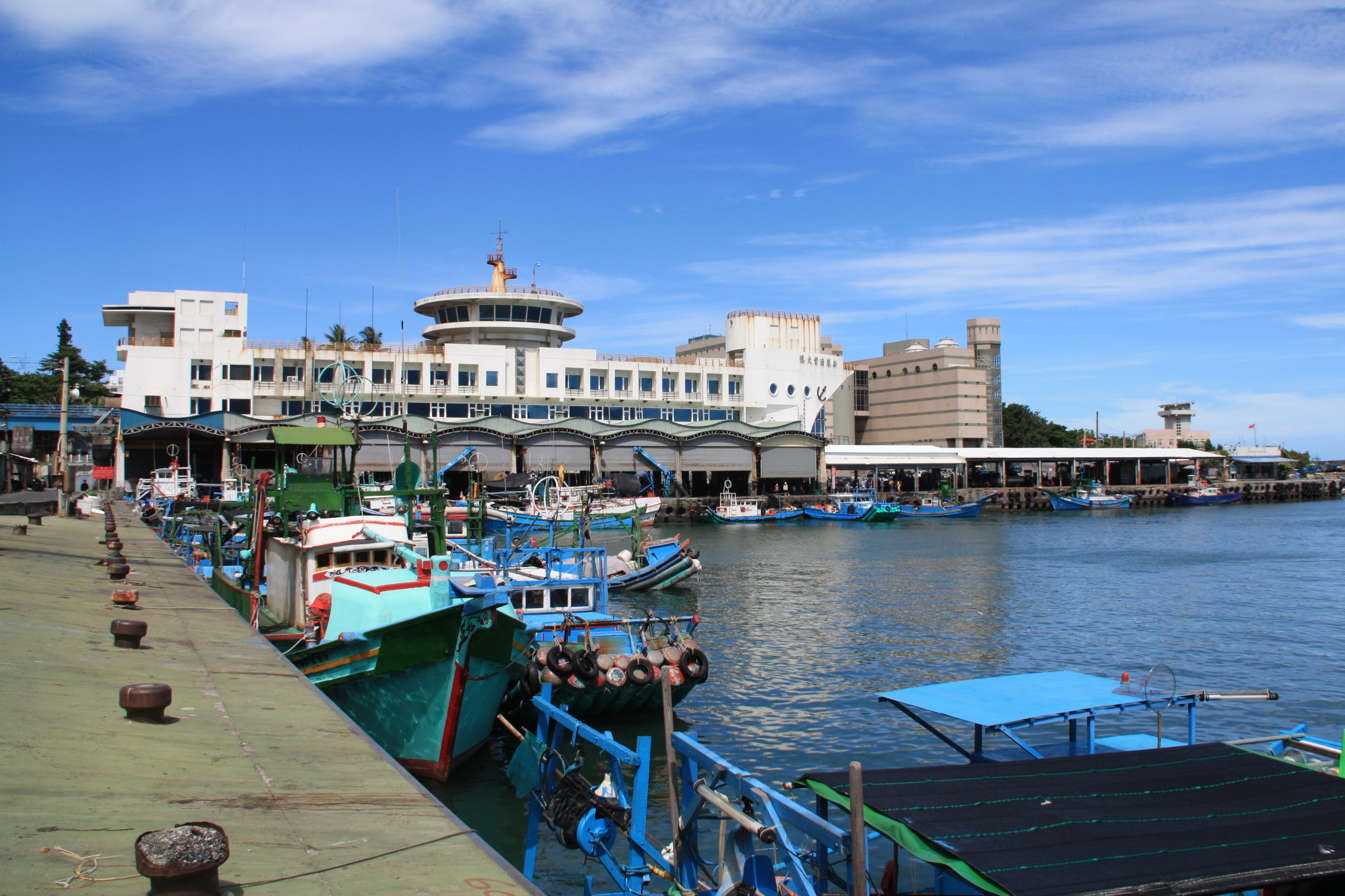
- Interactive map of Chenggong Fish Harbor 成功漁港
- Location within Taiwan

Location
- Location: Chenggong, Taitung County, Taiwan
- Coordinates: 23°05′50.6″N 121°23′00.3″E

Details
- Type of Harbor: port

The Chenggong Fish Harbor (traditional Chinese: 成功漁港; simplified Chinese: 成功渔港; pinyin: Chénggōng Yúgǎng) is a port in Chenggong Township, Taitung County, Taiwan.

== Facilities ==
The port features a fish market and boat rides for tourists for whales and dolphins viewing annually in May-October.

== Transportation ==
The port is accessible by bus from Taitung Station of Taiwan Railway.

== See also ==
- Transportation in Taiwan
