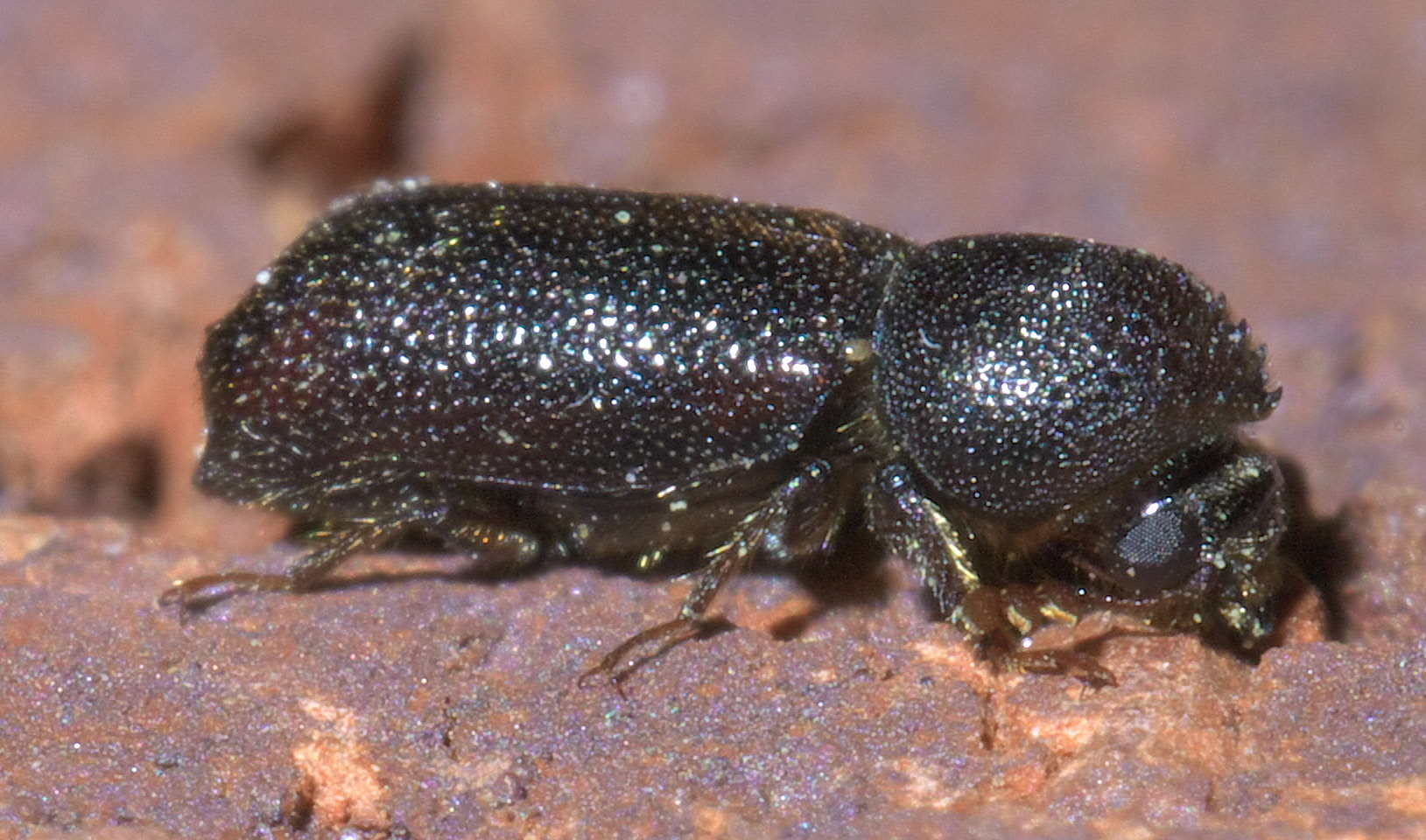
- Prostephanus punctatus

Scientific classification
- Kingdom: Animalia
- Phylum: Arthropoda
- Class: Insecta
- Order: Coleoptera
- Suborder: Polyphaga
- Family: Bostrichidae
- Subfamily: Dinoderinae
- Genus: Prostephanus; Lesne, 1898

= Prostephanus =

Genus of beetles

Prostephanus is a genus of horned powder-post beetles in the family Bostrichidae. There are about five described species in Prostephanus.

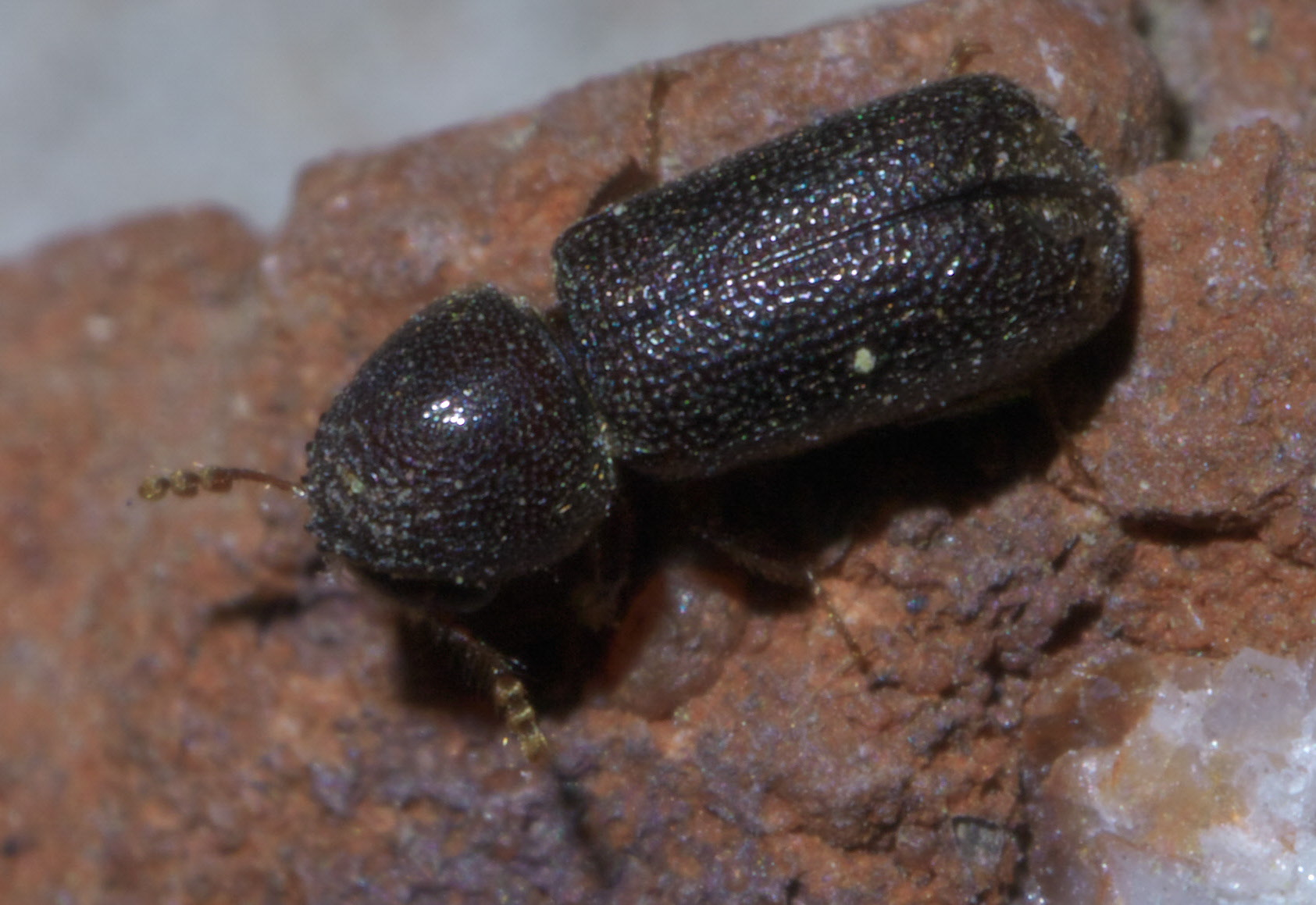
Prostephanus punctatus

== Species ==
These five species belong to the genus Prostephanus:

- Prostephanus apax Lesne, 1930
- Prostephanus arizonicus Fisher, 1950
- Prostephanus punctatus (Say, 1826)
- Prostephanus sulcicollis (Fairmaire & Germain, 1861)
- Prostephanus truncatus (Horn, 1878) (larger grain borer)
