= Amis people =

Austronesian ethnic group of Taiwan

Amis
Pangcah Muqami 阿美族
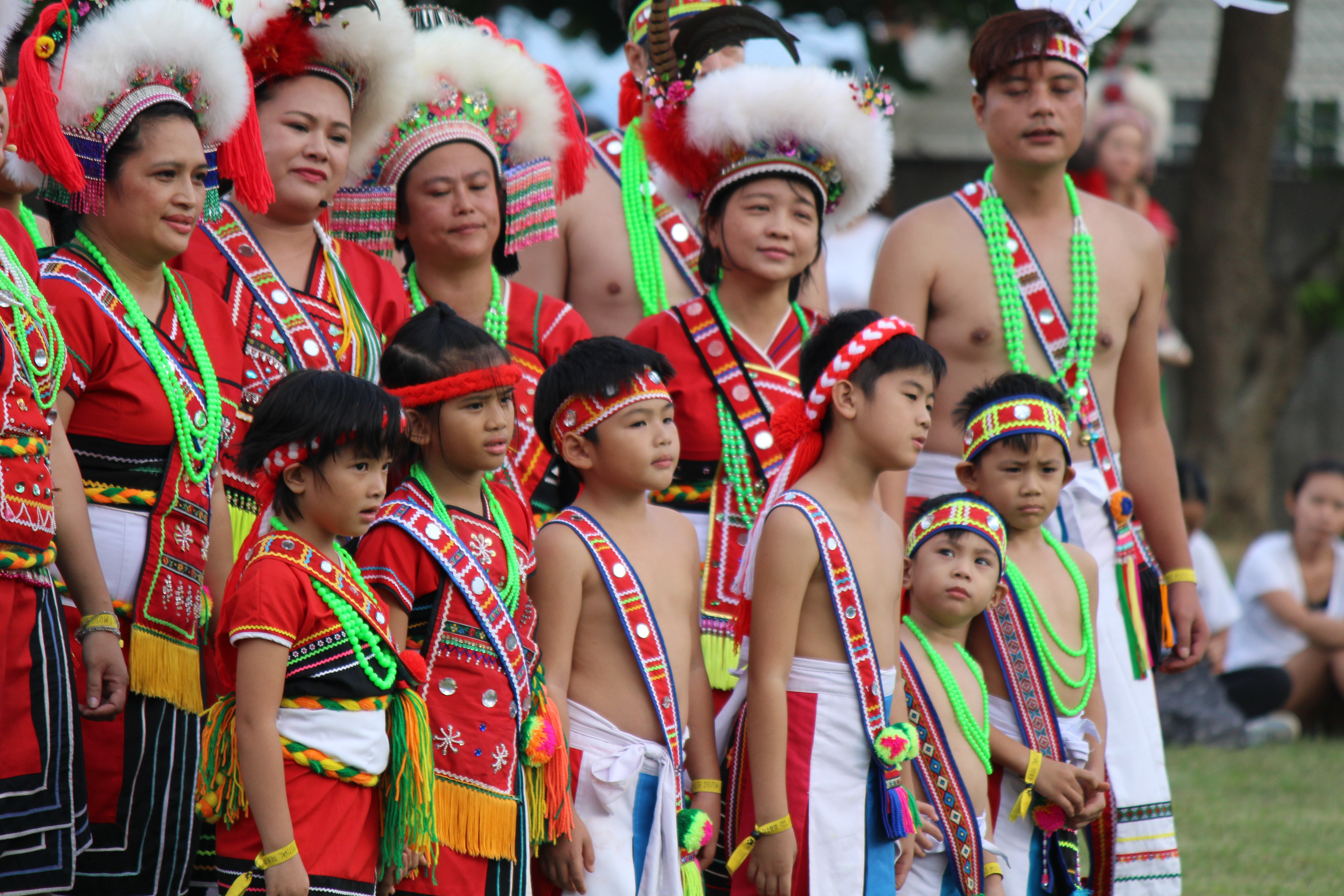

Total population
- 200,604 (2014)

Regions with significant populations
- Taiwan

Languages
- Amis, Mandarin, Hokkien

Religion
- Animism, Christianity

Related ethnic groups
- Sakizaya, Taiwanese indigenous peoples

The Amis (Amis: ʼAmis, ʼAmi), also known as the Pangcah (which means 'people' and 'kinsmen'), are an indigenous Austronesian ethnic group native to Taiwan. They have historically spoken the Amis language (Caciyaw no Pangcah; Minuqamian), an Austronesian language, and are one of the 16 officially recognized Taiwanese indigenous peoples. The traditional territory of the Amis includes the long, narrow valley between the Central Mountains and the Coastal Mountains (Huadong Valley), the Pacific coastal plain eastern to the Coastal Mountains and the Hengchun Peninsula.

In 2014, the Amis numbered 200,604. This was approximately 37.1% of Taiwan's total indigenous population, making them the largest indigenous group. The Amis are primarily fishermen due to their coastal location. They traditionally had a matrilineal kinship system, by which inheritance and property pass through the maternal line, and children are considered born to the mother's people.

Traditional Amis villages were relatively large for Taiwanese indigenous communities, typically holding between 500 and 1,000 people. In today's Taiwan, the Amis also comprise the majority of "urban indigenous people" and have developed many urban communities all around the island. In recent decades, Amis have also married exogamously to the Han as well as other indigenous peoples.

== Identity and classification ==
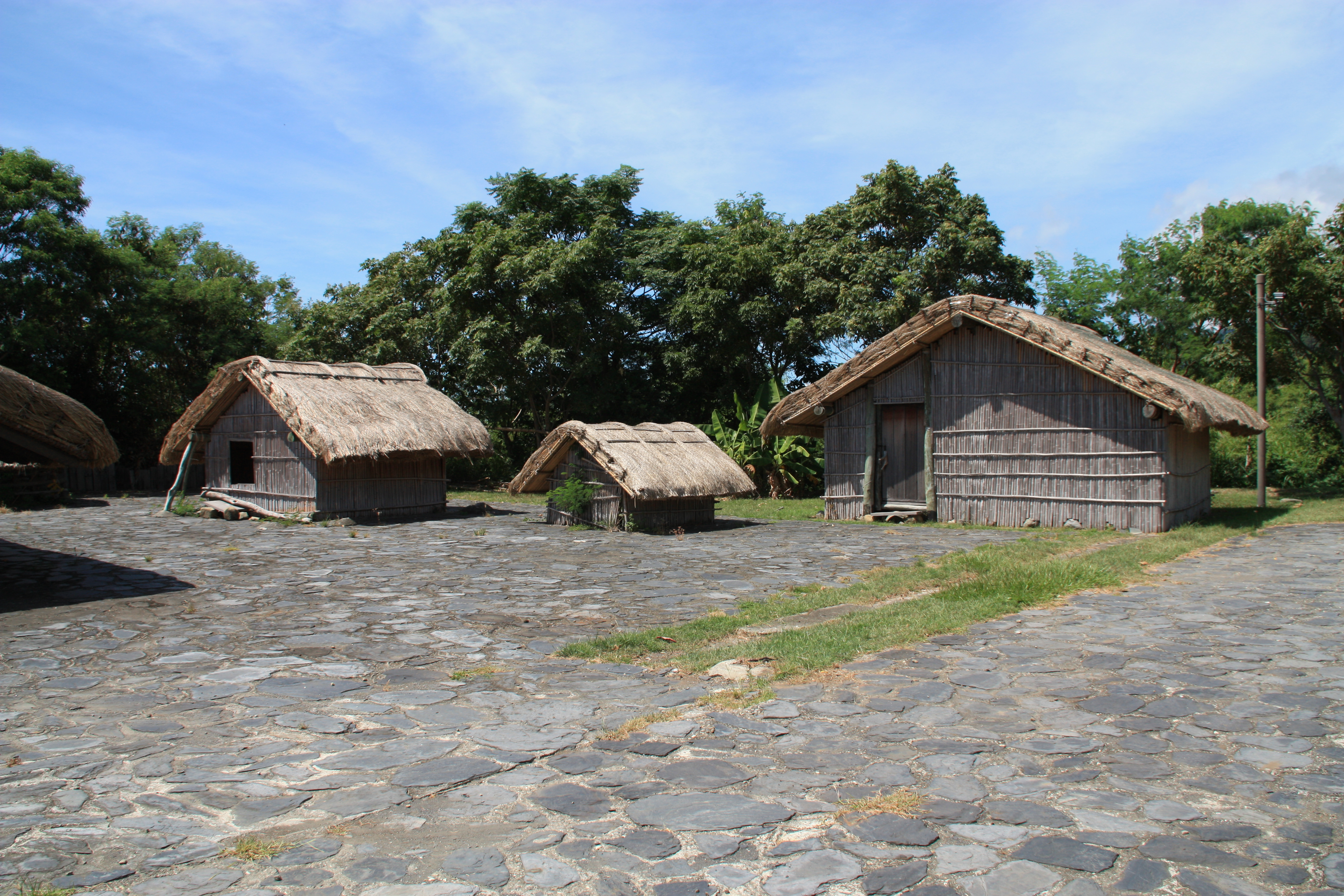
Amis Folk Center

The Amis people refer to themselves by two different ethnonyms. While those living in the East Rift Valley and Hualien County generally identify as Pangcah, which means "human" or "people of our kind," Amis living in coastal Taitung County employ the term Amis. Perhaps because of the official name, in 21st-century Taiwan, the term Amis is much more frequently used. This name comes from the word 'amis, meaning "north." There is still no consensus in the academic circle as to how "'Amis" came to be used to address the Pangcah. It may originally have been a term used by the Puyuma to refer to the Pangcah, who lived to the north of them. Another theory is that those who lived in the Taitung Plain called themselves "'Amis" because their ancestors had come from the north. This later explanation is recorded in the Banzoku Chōsa Hōkokusho, indicating this term may have originated from a group classified by anthropologists as Falangaw Amis, the Amis group occupying territory from today's Chengkung to the Taitung Plain. Their closest genetic relatives other than fellow Taiwan aboriginal groups appear to be the native Filipino people.

According to Taiwanese Aboriginal History: Amis, the Amis are classified into five groups:

- Northern group (located on the Chihlai/Hualien Plain)
- Middle group (located west of the Hai'an Range)
- Coastal group (located east of the Hai'an Range)
- Falangaw group (located Chenggong and the Taitung Plain)
- Hengchun group (located on the Hengchun Peninsula)

Such classification, however widely accepted, is based simply on the geographical distribution and ethnic migration. It does not correspond to observed differences in culture, language, and physiques.

The People's Republic of China (PRC), which claims Taiwan as part of its own territory, considers all of the Amis as part of a "Gaoshan" ethnic group, one of the 56 officially recognized ethnic groups of the PRC. "Gaoshan" is a catch-all term referring to Taiwanese indigenous peoples in general.

== Genetics ==
A genetic study showed that Austronesian speakers such as the Ami and Atayal of Taiwan, and Kankanaey of Philippines have significant ancestry (67% to 74%) related to Neolithic Fujian source. That Neolithic Fujian source is also estimated to contribute between 35% and 40% of Han Chinese ancestry in Guangdong and Fujian.

== Culture ==
=== Traditions ===
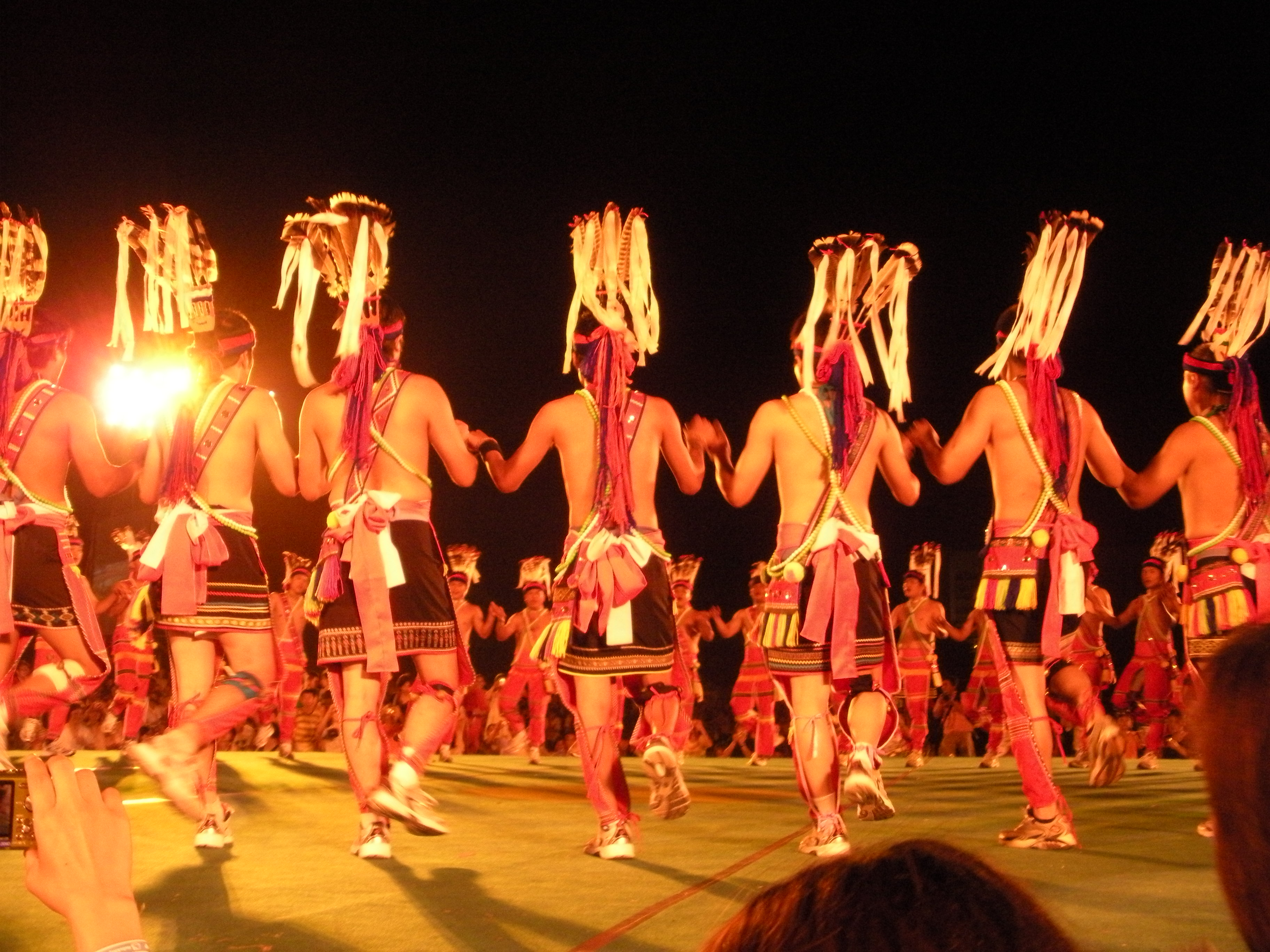
Harvest Festival

Family affairs, including finance of the family, are decided by the female householder, in the Amis tradition. The most important traditional ceremony is the Harvest Festival. The Amis Harvest Festival is held to express the people's thanks and appreciation to the gods, and to pray for harvest in the next coming year. It takes place every July to September.

=== Clothing ===
Traditional Amis clothes were made with cloth knitted with bark and banana threads with bamboo needles, and used wear-resistant linens and pelts. This evolved during the 20th Century with the arrival of cotton, acquired by the Amis through barter, which progressively replaced traditional materials. There are two clothing styles: Hualien and Taitung. Both use a head scarf, chest covering and a skirt. Chiefs and priests, on the other hand, wear robes and rattan headgear, to distinguish themselves. They also have an ‘alufo’ (“lover’s bag”), made with betel nut by their mother or their lover, which is both used in everyday life and during rituals. It is traditionally used to carry betel nut, limestone, betel and smoking pipes.

Traditionally black, Amis clothing evolved during the 20th century to using more and more red, “for its perceived festiveness and compatibility with ethno-tourism”. The coloring of necklaces distinguishes different Amis communities. Floral headdresses are also often used during special occasions, such as the harvest.

=== Instruments and Musicking ===
Amis people used some of instrument called Kokang, Kakeng. Firstly, Kokang is a traditional instrument, which is a type of xylophone and a kind of percussion. Amis people firstly made Kokang for getting animals away from their resident area. It’s the beginning of how Kokang is made in the Amis people community.

Amis Kokang is made of softwood, which is aged about for three months to make their sound clear, and some Kokang is made of bamboo, and it is called “Kakeng”, which is slightly different from “Kokang”. Kokang and Kakeng is called “Tatuk, Dodang” in other tribes like “Truku”, “Chimei”, “Atayal”, which are adjacent to each other.

Amis people run a group called “Amis Kakeng Musical Group”. They mainly use Kakeng, which is made of bamboo, and a few types of Amis Kokang in performances. Ensembles in Amis people are processed as group performances, and either sometimes as solo percussionists. Amis people held Kokang performances as cultural events for Taiwanese people.

== Representation in media ==
The musical project Enigma used an Amis chant in their song "Return to Innocence", on their second album, The Cross of Changes (1993). This song was used as the theme song of the 1996 Atlanta Olympics. The main chorus was sung by Difang and Igay Duana, who were part of a Taiwanese aboriginal cultural performance group.

Maison des Cultures du Monde had earlier recorded the singing of this group while on tour, and released a CD. This song was subsequently used by Enigma (although they did not note the ethnic origin of the song and the singers). The recording studio and the Taiwanese group filed a suit for copyright infringement, which was later settled by Enigma out of court. Ami singing is known for its complex contrapuntal polyphony.

== Notable Amis people ==
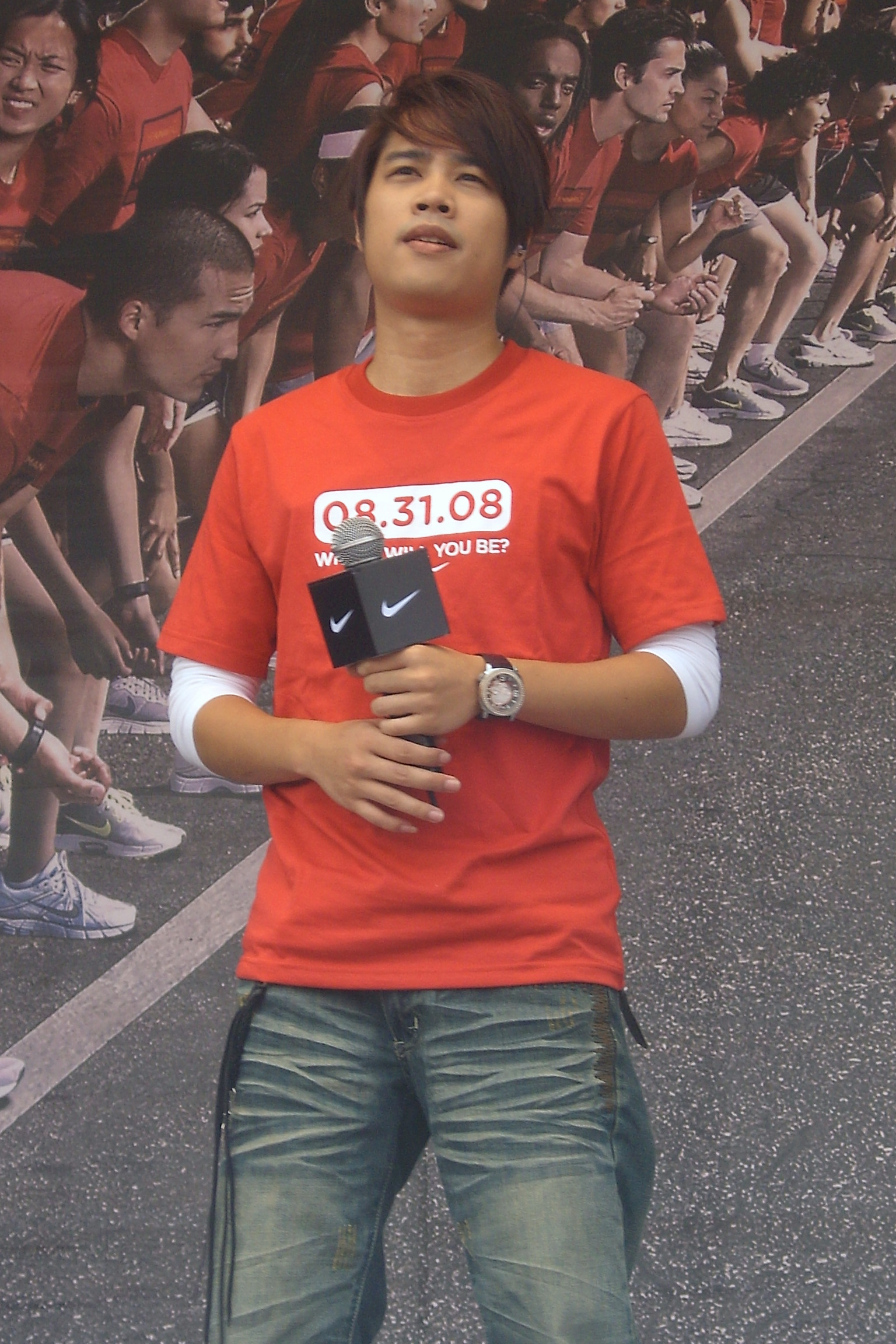
Amis singer Tank

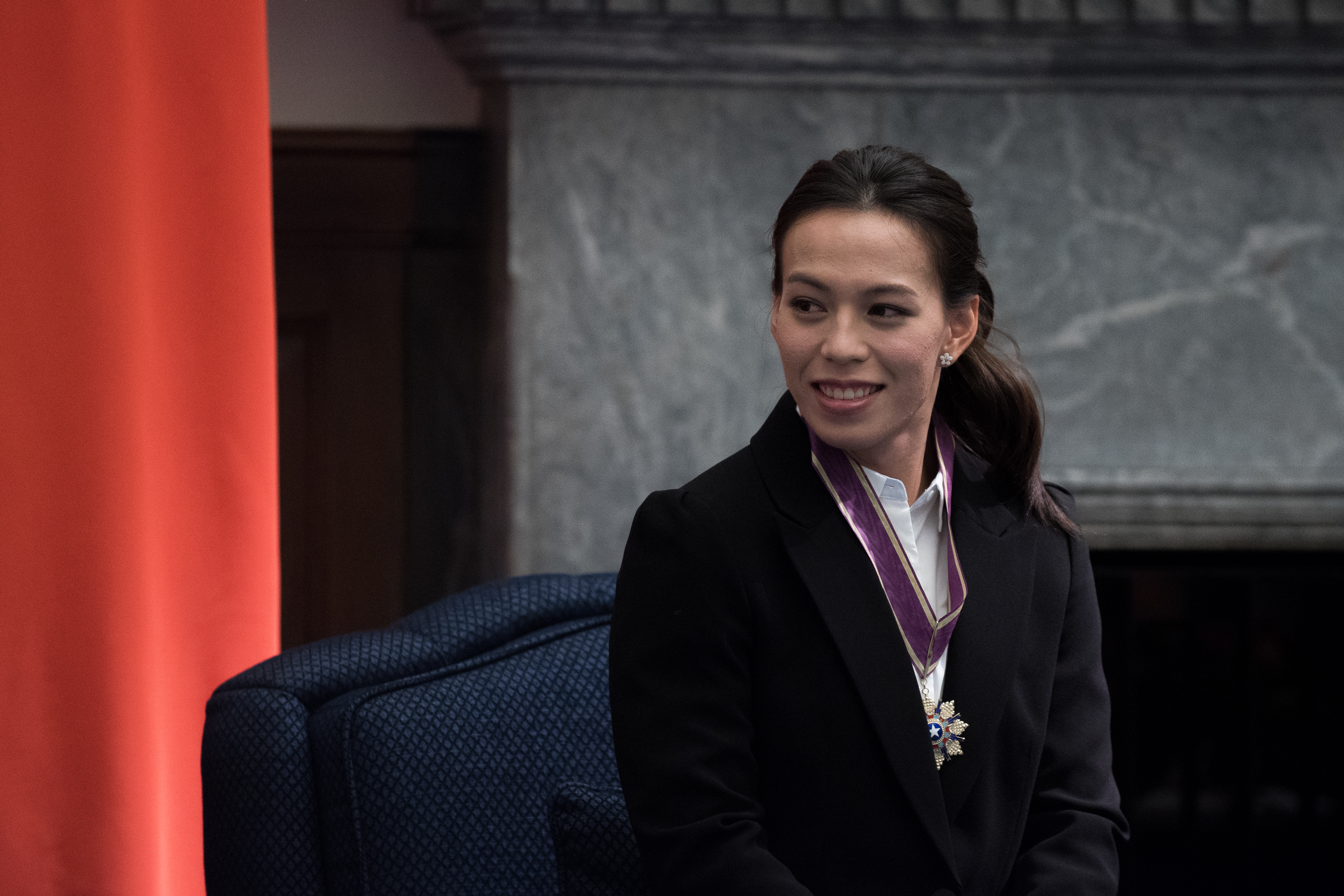
Amis weightlifter Kuo Hsing-chun

- A-Lin, singer, songwriter
- Ngayaw Ake, baseball player
- Yu Chang, baseball player
- Lin Chih-chieh, basketball player
- Chen Chih-yuan, baseball player
- Yang Chuan-kwang, Olympic decathlete
- Kuo Dai-chi, baseball player
- Mayaw Dongi, Minister of Council of Indigenous Peoples (2013–2016)
- Difang and Igay Duana, husband-and-wife folk music duo
- Van Fan, singer, actor
- Ehlo Huang, actor and member of pop group 183 Club
- Jam Hsiao, singer
- Kuo Hsing-chun, weightlifter and Olympic gold medalist
- Ilid Kaolo, singer and songwriter
- Ayal Komod, singer
- Tseng Li-cheng, 2012 Olympics Taekwondo bronze medalist
- Hao Yu Lee, baseball player
- Show Lo, singer, actor, host
- Lin Man-ting, football and futsal player
- Ati Masaw, baseball player
- Teruo Nakamura, Taiwan-born soldier of the Imperial Japanese Army and the last Japanese holdout soldier of World War II
- Kawlo Iyun Pacidal, member of Legislative Yuan
- Kolas Yotaka, member of Legislative Yuan and Spokesperson for the Executive Yuan and the Office of the President
- Icyang Parod, Minister of Council of Indigenous Peoples
- Yang Sen, baseball player
- Sufin Siluko, member of Legislative Yuan
- Suming, actor, singer, songwriter. His music features elements from traditional Amis culture. Founder of the Amis Music Festival.
- Li Tai-hsiang, composer and folk songwriter
- Tank, singer
- Tseng Te-Ping, singer
- Chin-hui Tsao, baseball player
- Dai-Kang Yang, baseball player
- Wei-Chung Wang, baseball player
- Wayne Huang, singer, actor, host

== See also ==
- Demographics of Taiwan
- Taiwanese indigenous peoples
- Amis Folk Center
- Kawas (mythology)
