= Amis Folk Center =

Cultural center in Chenggong, Taitung County, Taiwan

- 阿美民俗中心
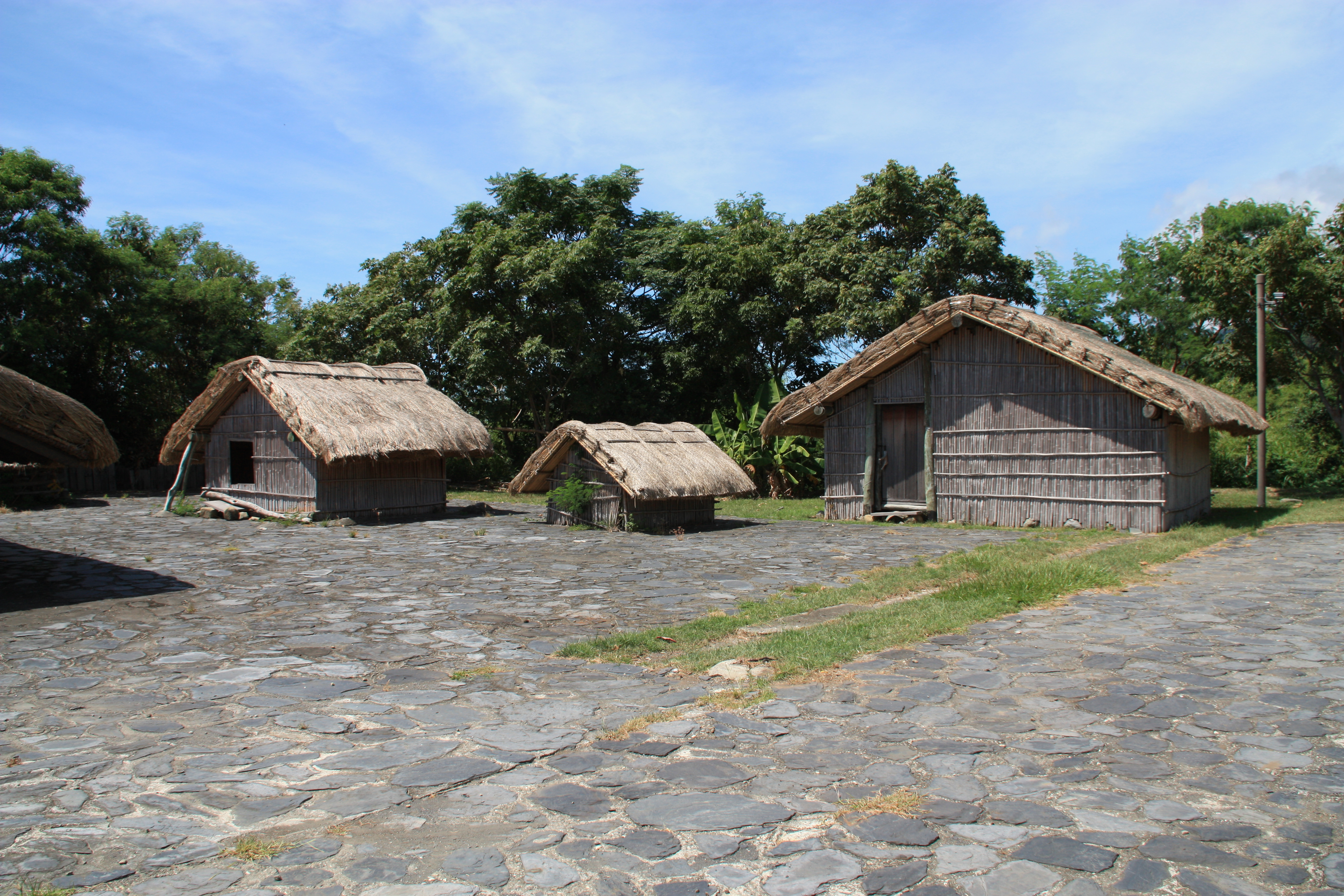
- Interactive map of Amis Folk Center
- Location: Chenggong, Taitung County, Taiwan
- Coordinates: 23°01′08.2″N 121°19′27.9″E
- Type: cultural center
- Surface: 2 hectares

Construction
- Opened: November 1995

The Amis Folk Center (Chinese: 阿美民俗中心; pinyin: Āměi Mínsú Zhōngxīn) is a cultural center in Chenggong Township, Taitung County, Taiwan about Amis people.

== History ==
The center was opened in November 1995.

== Architecture ==
The center has an area of around 2 hectares in size. The main building of family and festival houses are based on the hand drawings of Guangfu Township in Hualien County from 1943 by a Japanese ethnologist. The buildings are the imitation of Shaman's house in Taibalang community in Hualien County. The center has an outdoor performance square and an outlook that can hold 2,000 people at one time.

== Transportation ==
The center is accessible by bus from Hualien Station or Taitung Station of Taiwan Railway.

== See also ==
- List of tourist attractions in Taiwan
