= Taitung County Museum of Natural History =

Museum in Chenggong, Taitung County, Taiwan

- 臺東縣自然史教育館
- Location: Chenggong, Taitung County, Taiwan
- Coordinates: 23°07′14.9″N 121°23′37.6″E
- Type: museum
- Website: Official website (in Chinese)

The Taitung County Museum of Natural History (traditional Chinese: 臺東縣自然史教育館; simplified Chinese: 台东县自然史教育馆; pinyin: Táidōng Xiàn Zìrán Shǐ Jiàoyù Guǎn) is a museum in Sanxian Village, Chenggong Township, Taitung County, Taiwan.

== Architecture ==
The museum is housed in a 3-story building. The ground floor houses the research archive room and special exhibition room. The upper and topmost floors house the exhibition hall.

== Exhibitions ==
The museum displays marine biological samples from the east coast of Taiwan artifacst. It also displays various information regarding the nature of Taiwan.

== See also ==
- List of museums in Taiwan
