= Prostephanus arizonicus =

Scientific classification
- Domain: Eukaryota
- Kingdom: Animalia
- Phylum: Arthropoda
- Class: Insecta
- Order: Coleoptera
- Suborder: Polyphaga
- Family: Bostrichidae
- Genus: Prostephanus
- Species: P. arizonicus

Binomial name
- Prostephanus arizonicus Fisher, 1950

Species of beetle

Prostephanus arizonicus is a species of horned powder-post beetle in the family Bostrichidae. It is found in North America.
