= Sakizaya people =

Indigenous ethnic group of Taiwan

Sakuzaya
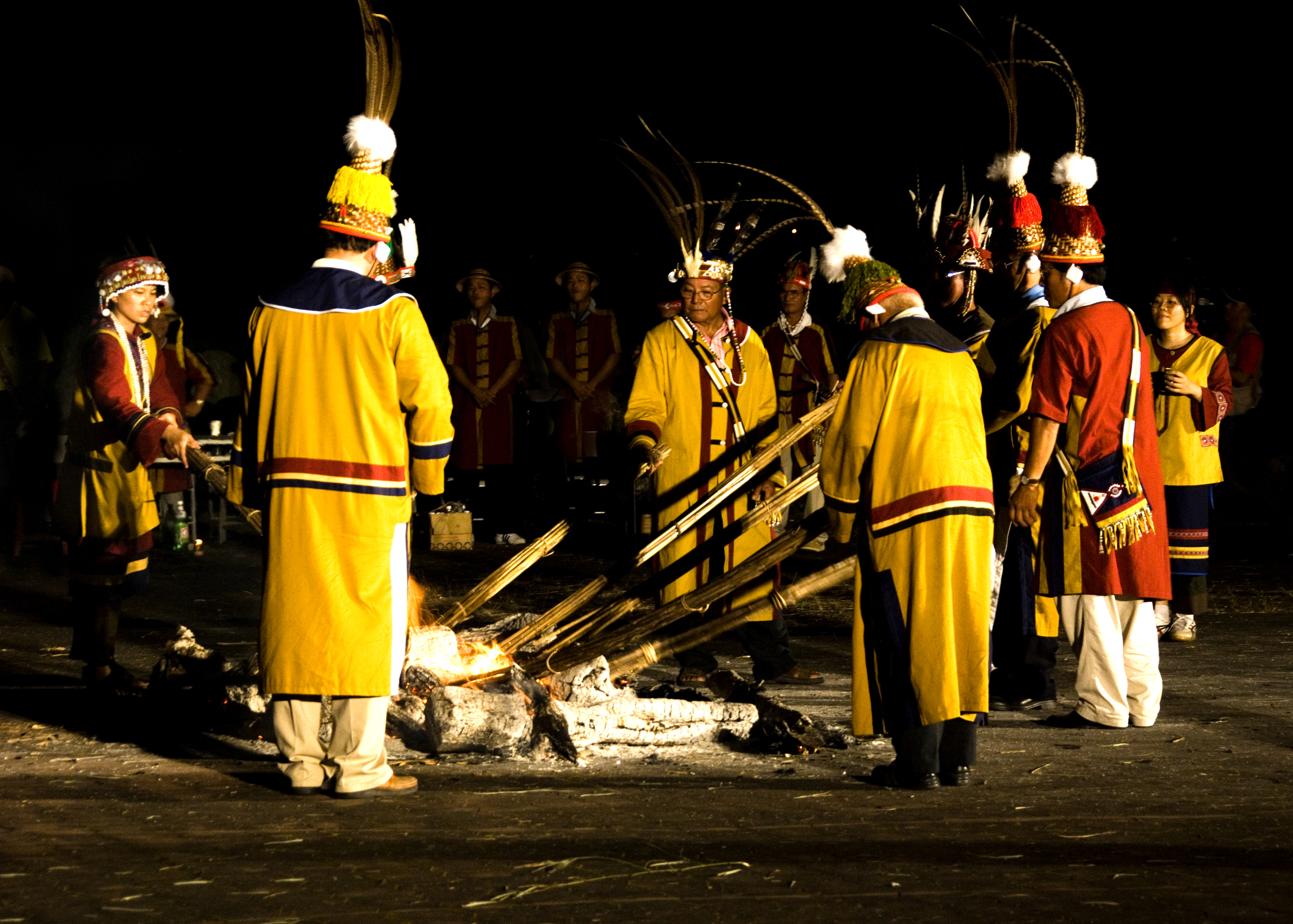
- Palamal, the Ceremony of Fire

Total population
- 997 (June 2020)

Regions with significant populations
- Hualien

Languages
- Mandarin, Sakizaya, Hokkien

Religion
- Ancestor Worship, Animism, Christianity

Related ethnic groups
- Amis, Kavalan, other Taiwanese indigenous peoples

The Sakizaya (native name: Sakuzaya, literally "real man"; Chinese: 撒奇萊雅族; pinyin: Sāqíláiyǎ; occasionally Sakiraya or Sakidaya) are Taiwanese indigenous peoples with a population of approximately 1,000. They primarily live in Hualien (formerly known as Kiray), where their culture is centered.

The Sakizaya are an Austronesian people, mostly related to other Taiwanese indigenous peoples, and have cultural, linguistic, and genetic ties to other Austronesian ethnic groups, such as those from the Philippines, Malaysia, Indonesia, Madagascar, and Oceania.

The Sakizaya traditionally practiced ancestor worship, which includes the worship of a pantheon of gods and ancestral spirits. However, most have converted to Christianity. Their society is mostly matrilinear, and women often have the authority. On 17 January 2007, the Taiwan government recognized the community as a distinct ethnic group. Before this, the people was previously classified as Amis, the group where they "hid" after they, and their Kavalan allies, fought a devastating battle against Qing invaders during the late 19th century.

== History ==
Due to their intermingling within other peoples, the original genetic identity of the Sakizaya is uncertain. According to one study, they are intimately related to the Northern and Middle Amis. They also seem to share certain genetic traits with other indigenous groups, as well as with the Taiwanese Han, though this may have been a result of intermarriage. The C2 and C3 haplogroups are absent in their population.

=== Early history ===
Much of the history of the Sakizaya is unknown. It is unclear when the Sakizaya, or their ancestors, first arrived in Taiwan. According to some experts, the first human inhabitants of the island arrived 15,000 years ago and were dependent on marine life for survival. Neolithic peoples began arriving 6,000 years ago, which allowed the advent of agriculture, domestic animals, polished stone adzes, and pottery. The presence of these adzes imply a relation with the Penghu islands, where these objects are common.

=== Colonial era ===
The first contact with the community outside of Formosa occurred during the 17th century, when the Dutch and the Spanish arrived. It was during this time when a 1636 Spanish document was written about the name and activities of the people. Since then, there were not any reports of external contact until the 19th century.

=== Karewan Incident ===
In 1878, the Sakizaya and their Kavalan allies fought a devastating battle against Qing invaders known as the Karewan Incident (also known as the Takubuwa Incident). Despite fighting that lasted over a hundred days, thousands of Sakizaya died. Among the casualties also were the chief Kumud Pazik, his wife Icep Kanasaw, and the military commander Bakah Tiway. The remaining Sakizaya were forced to blend with other peoples, such as the Ami, with the intention of protecting their identity.

When the Empire of Japan ruled Taiwan in 1895, anthropologists classified the people as a subgroup of the Amis. The people, however, discreetly maintained their own culture and language which continued during the next century.

=== Modern times ===
In 2004, the community presented a petition for official ethnic group status to the Council of Indigenous Peoples based on historical, linguistic and cultural data. This was officially filed on 13 October 2005. Eventually, the petition was approved on 17 January 2007, recognizing them as a distinct ethnic group.

Like other Taiwanese indigenous peoples, the Sakizaya face contemporary social and economic challenges. These include urbanization of the youth, a phenomenon that may affect their culture.

== Language ==
The Sakizaya language was classified as a dialect of Nataoran Amis, a Formosan language that belongs to the Austronesian language family. However, the National Chengchi University opened the classification to debate, stating that Sakizaya remains 60–70% different from the Amis language despite the two groups living together. Currently, there are about 2,000 speakers of the language.

The people also speak several other languages. These include languages spoken by the peoples where they have hidden such as Amis, and Mandarin, the official language of the Republic of China.

== Religion ==
The Sakizaya practice a variety of religions. These include traditional beliefs that mixes aspects of ancestor worship and animism. Some may also practice Christianity.

The traditional religious beliefs of the Sakizaya are currently experiencing external pressures since many of the tribesmen may have converted to Christianity. The threat is heightened by the increasing importance of Christianity to the community.

=== Ancestor worship/animism ===
==== Dito ====
The people are known to practice ancestor worship. They believe on a pantheon of ancestral spirits and deities known as dito, similar to the kawas of the Amis, as well as the anito of the Filipinos. They are considered to be "fickle as the weather" so priests or mapalaway are necessary to communicate with them. They are invisible to most people though they are known to wear red. Several beliefs are associated with these spirits, such as pregnancy and death. The homeland of the dito is Meilun Mountain in Hualien, which is also the place where the deceased pass through before finally resting in the sea.

==== Gods and rituals ====
The Sakizaya have several gods. A few examples include Malataw‧Otoki, the deity the spirit of the world, Olipong, the god that "drives away illnesses", and Talaman or Takonawan, the god of the poor. An individual's personal dito become the god of death once they have died.

Rituals are practiced to appease the dito and often resemble closely rituals performed by other Austronesian peoples. The practice of these are dictated according to the seasons: spring or pasavaan, summer or ralod, fall or sadinsing, and winter or kasinawan. An example of these is the Palamal or the "Worship of the Fire God".

According to a Japanese document, several rituals are associated with the main staples, millet or havay and dry rice or tipus. These included the "Millet Sowing Ritual", "Fishing Ritual", "Collecting Ritual", "Harvest Ritual", and "Storing Ritual", which are all based on the growth of the millet.

=== Christianity ===
Another religion practiced by some Sakizaya is Christianity. The religion first arrived in Formosa during the age of European colonization. Its formal arrival occurred in 1627, during the arrival of Georgius Candidius, the first ordained minister to set foot on the island. According to this missionary, the conversion of the natives was effective. The conversion was so successful that native clergymen soon became a necessity. This success, however, was short-lived since Christians faced persecution after the arrival of the Chinese. It was not until late in the 20th century that this religion began to achieve its resurgence.

Currently, almost 70 percent of Taiwanese indigenous peoples practice Christianity, though the exact number of Sakizaya practicing this religion is uncertain. The religion has become effective in maintaining social unity, which has been held by traditional practices.

== Society and culture ==
Only a few aspects of the Sakizaya's society and culture have been revealed. It is known that they have a matrilinear society. Women often have the authority in the household.

In terms of survival, fishing and hunting are important. Rice cultivation also forms a significant aspect of their food production. This practice is thought to have been acquired through the Kavalan. Millet is important as a food source and as a way in determining the occasions of festivals.

Headhunting was once prevalent but has fallen out of practice.

The culture of the Sakizaya is under threat due to the small but steady urbanization of Sakizaya youth. Efforts to preserve their culture have been initiated by the government, which believes this could be beneficial to ecotourism.

=== Clothing ===
The Sakizaya's traditional attire was initially very similar to the Amis people’s, since it was considered to be a part of the Amis tribe. Both tribes originally wore red clothing, but after the Cultural Revitalization Movement in 2007, the Sakizaya people redesigned their attire, incorporating elements from their history and legends to distinguish it from Amis clothing. They aimed to convey a new story using a variety of colors among which the most significant ones were: gold yellow for earth and homeland, light brown for identity, red for the historical battles and blue for peace and friendship with the Amis.

Sakizaya clothing consists of upper garments, vests, leg coverings, betel nut bags, and headgear. Women's attire includes earthy gold vests and blood-colored inner robes, symbolizing mature women's responsibility for the land and family continuity. Unmarried girls wear mainly earthy gold without the dark red, representing childbirth. The brown and green on the skirt and leg coverings represent branches, grass, and mud from their ancestors' clothes. This serves as a reminder of the challenges they faced when escaping from enemies.

Men's clothing continues the main colors of the ethnic group. The short vest-style tops highlight the strength and agility of the male warriors, The pants with a back panel skirt consisted mainly of blue, red and yellow colors and its main purpose of was just to allow easy movement. During special celebrations long golden robes are also usually worn by important community leaders.

Regarding headgears, men and women headgears represent different cultural backgrounds. Men’s headwear symbolizes the heroic story of two tribesmen sacrificing their lives for the whole tribe by jumping into the flood. After the flood the triangular piece of snow-white marble rock was created on the Shabolu mountain, which is now a symbol on the men’s headwear. Women headwear on the other hand represents the hardships in the battle of 1878, by incorporating dark red for bloodshed, oval flakes for execution, long tubes for thorny bamboo, white drops for tears, and green beads for tribal defense.

=== Age-class systems ===
According to Japanese researchers, Sakizaya men are divided into age-class systems, known as sral, where they stay for about five years. Between infancy and 15 years of age, boys are classed into the child class or wawa. They soon participate in a ritual known as Masatrot and are trained in a youth-house or talaon, where they learn to obey orders as well as certain commands. Once they accomplished this, they would move to the preparatory youth class or kapah and stay there until they are 23 years of age, when they finally reach the superior class.

== See also ==
- Demographics of Taiwan
