= Chenggong, Taitung =

Urban township in Taitung County, Taiwan

Coordinates: 23°7′0″N 121°21′0″E

Chenggong Township 成功鎮 Shinkō, Moalaulau
- Urban township
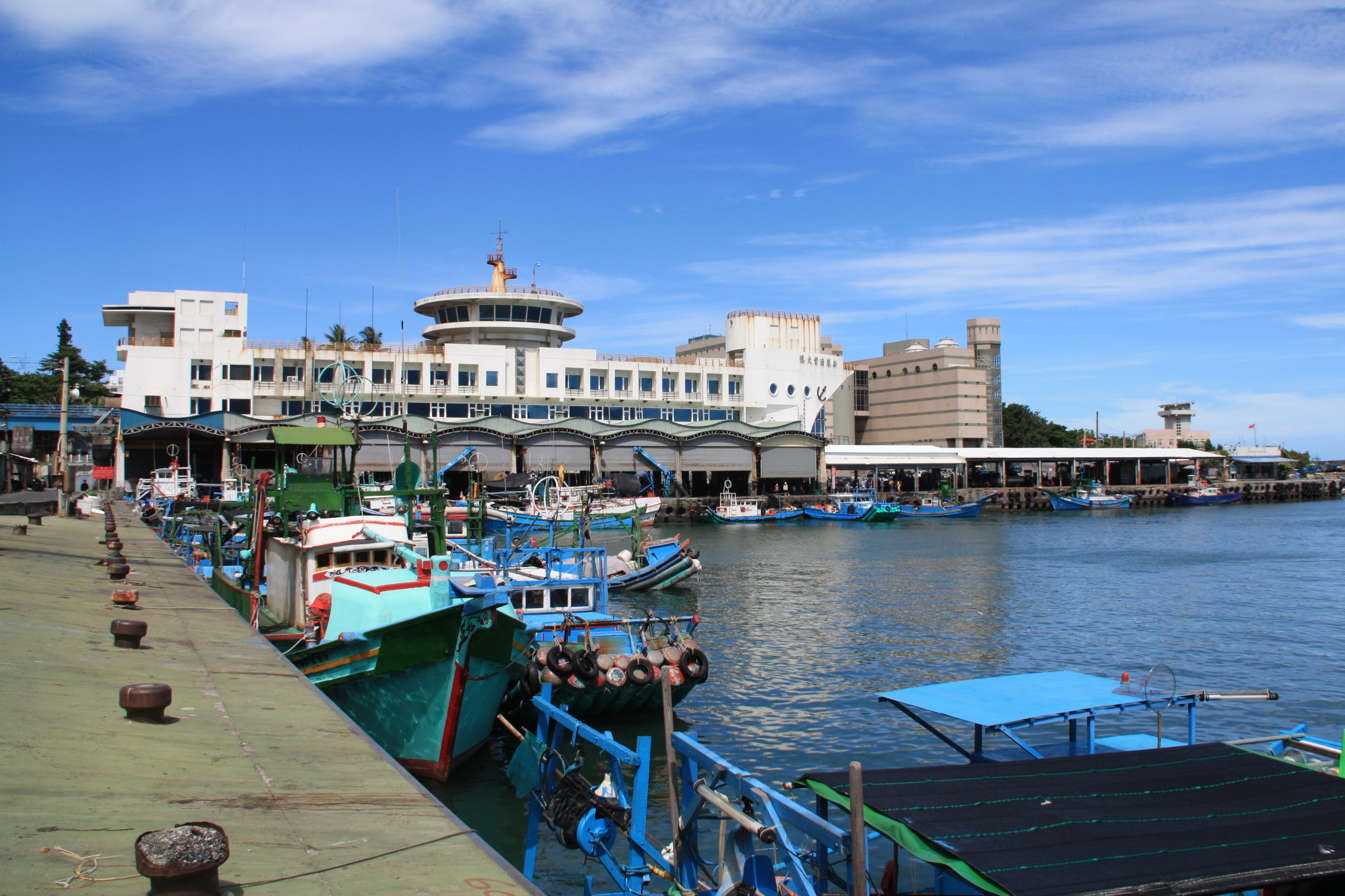

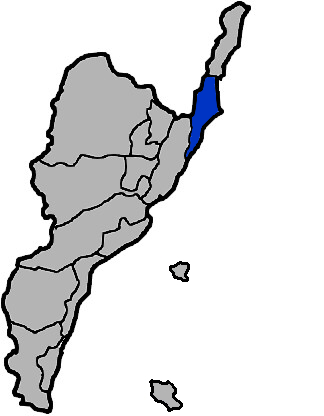
- Chenggong Township in Taitung County
- Location: Taitung County, Taiwan

Area
  - Total: 144 km^{2} (56 sq mi)

Population (February 2023)
  - Total: 13,193
  - Density: 91.6/km^{2} (237/sq mi)

Chenggong Township or Chengkung Township (Chinese: 成功鎮; pinyin: Chénggōng Zhèn; Wade–Giles: Ch'eng^{2}-kung^{1} Chen^{4}; Pe̍h-ōe-jī: Sêng-kong-tìn) is an urban township in Taitung County, Taiwan. It is a coastal town facing the Pacific Ocean. Chenggong Fish Harbor is just west of downtown.

== History ==
Chenggong was originally an Amis settlement from which came the Hokkien name Moalaulau (Chinese: 麻荖漏; Pe̍h-ōe-jī: Môa-láu-lāu). During Japanese rule, it was renamed to Shinkō Town (Japanese: 新港街) of Taitō Prefecture. After 1945, to avoid confusion with Singang Township of Chiayi County and to distinguish it from Tainan's Sinckan (now called Sinshih), it was changed to Chenggong, which commemorates the eponymous general Koxinga (Cheng Ch'eng-kung) who expelled the Dutch from Taiwan.

== Geography ==
The township has 13,193 inhabitants and its total area is 144.9938 km².

=== Climate ===
Along with most of the rest of Taitung County, Chenggong has a Tropical rainforest climate.

Climate data for Chenggong (1991–2020 normals, extremes 1940–present）
Month	Jan	Feb	Mar	Apr	May	Jun	Jul	Aug	Sep	Oct	Nov	Dec	Year
Record high °C (°F)	28.7 (83.7)	29.5 (85.1)	32.5 (90.5)	33.1 (91.6)	35.8 (96.4)	35.7 (96.3)	38.1 (100.6)	39.1 (102.4)	37.5 (99.5)	38.5 (101.3)	31.5 (88.7)	30.2 (86.4)	39.1 (102.4)
Mean daily maximum °C (°F)	22.4 (72.3)	22.9 (73.2)	24.3 (75.7)	26.7 (80.1)	29.0 (84.2)	30.7 (87.3)	31.8 (89.2)	31.6 (88.9)	30.7 (87.3)	28.8 (83.8)	26.4 (79.5)	23.5 (74.3)	27.4 (81.3)
Daily mean °C (°F)	19.0 (66.2)	19.4 (66.9)	20.9 (69.6)	23.2 (73.8)	25.4 (77.7)	27.3 (81.1)	28.1 (82.6)	27.9 (82.2)	27.0 (80.6)	25.2 (77.4)	22.9 (73.2)	20.2 (68.4)	23.9 (75.0)
Mean daily minimum °C (°F)	16.5 (61.7)	16.9 (62.4)	18.3 (64.9)	20.6 (69.1)	22.8 (73.0)	24.6 (76.3)	25.2 (77.4)	25.0 (77.0)	24.2 (75.6)	22.6 (72.7)	20.4 (68.7)	17.8 (64.0)	21.2 (70.2)
Record low °C (°F)	6.9 (44.4)	9.9 (49.8)	9.8 (49.6)	11.8 (53.2)	16.3 (61.3)	17.6 (63.7)	21.3 (70.3)	21.4 (70.5)	17.4 (63.3)	15.1 (59.2)	12.0 (53.6)	9.5 (49.1)	6.9 (44.4)
Average precipitation mm (inches)	67.3 (2.65)	70.1 (2.76)	70.1 (2.76)	88.3 (3.48)	159.8 (6.29)	170.8 (6.72)	245.5 (9.67)	342.2 (13.47)	329.3 (12.96)	283.1 (11.15)	153.3 (6.04)	87.2 (3.43)	2,067 (81.38)
Average precipitation days (≥ 0.1 mm)	15.0	15.0	15.5	14.6	16.9	12.1	9.8	11.8	15.2	15.6	14.5	14.1	170.1
Average relative humidity (%)	74.7	76.5	77.7	79.5	81.5	82.2	79.7	79.8	78.5	74.3	75.2	73.9	77.8
Mean monthly sunshine hours	69.4	62.2	74.8	88.3	124.4	188.1	237.3	209.8	161	140.1	101.4	80.3	1,537.1
Source: Central Weather Bureau

== Administrative divisions ==
- Bo'ai Village 博愛村
- Heping Village 和平村
- Sanmin Village 三民村
- Sanxian Village 三仙村
- Xinyi Village 信義村
- Zhongren Village 忠仁村
- Zhongxiao Village 忠孝村
- Zhongzhi Village 忠智村

== Demographics ==
The majority inhabitants of the township are the Amis people which makes up to 53% of the population.

== Notable people ==
- Teruo Nakamura (1919-1979, Attun Palalin or Lee Guang-Hui) last known Japanese hold-out to surrender after the end of hostilities in 1945

== Economy ==
- Agriculture
- Fisheries
- Forestry

== Tourist attractions ==
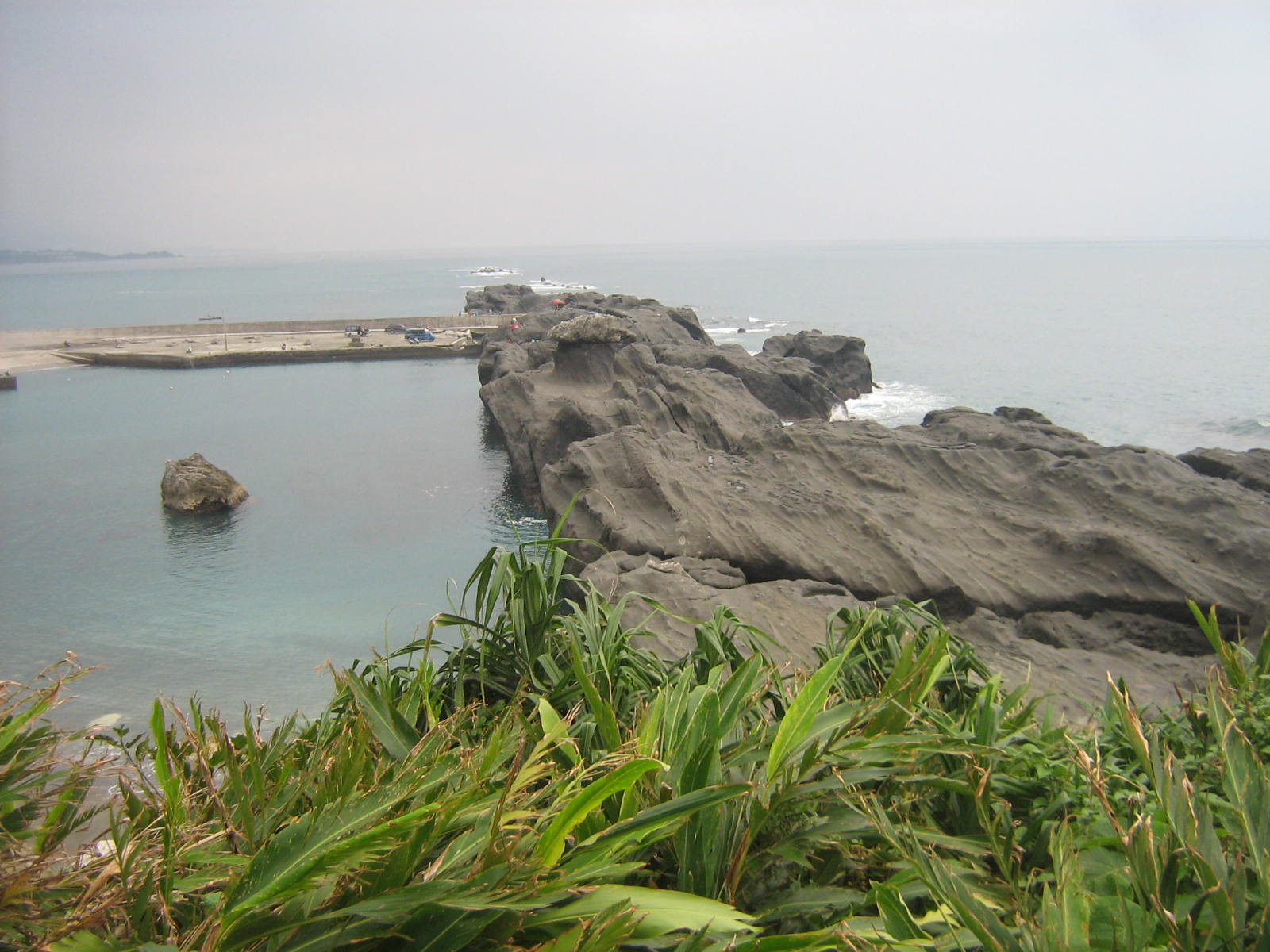
Stone Umbrella

- Amis Folk Center
- Chengkung Aquarium
- Chengkuankao Cultural Landscape
- Chengkuankao Matsu Temple
- Chong-an Waterfall
- East Coast National Scenic Area
- Jiaping Beach
- Old Donghe Bridge
- Oceanarium
- Sanxiantai
- Shihyusan (Awana, or the Stone Umbrella)
- Siaoma Tunnel
- Singang Harbor
- Singang Waterfall
- Taitung County Museum of Natural History
- Taitung Museum of Marine Biology and Aquarium

== Transportation ==
- Provincial Highway No.11
- Chenggong Fish Harbor
- Singang Port
