= Grain storage on subsistence farms =

Grain storage methods on subsistence farms focus on reducing grain loss after harvest. Spillage, decomposition and being eaten by insects, rodents and other pests are the main ways of grain loss. In small subsistence farms, between 20% and 100% of grain can be lost, leading to food insecurity for farmers. Modern grain storage methods can reduce grain loss rates to less than 1%.

== Hermetic grain storage systems ==
=== Overview ===
Hermetic grain storage is a method of storing grain or seeds inside sealed, air-tight containers. This method prevents moisture from entering, depletes oxygen and raises carbon dioxide levels. These conditions are unfavorable for fungi, bacteria and insects. Hermetic storage can prevent grain loss without the application of pesticides.

Clay pots, sealed plastic bags, metal containers etc. can be used as hermetic storage containers. Precautions must be taken to prevent insect infestation during storage and sealing. Ideal hermetic storage methods allow grains to be stored for long periods without loss in quality.

Hermetic storage has been widely adopted in Africa, Asia and the Americas. This method is most useful for farmers in developing countries.

Benefits of using the hermetic storage method include extending grain life, preventing insect infestation without pesticides and resistance to harsh conditions (except temperatures in below 0°C, which are unfavorable for the storage of oil palm seeds). Hermetic storage prevents mold, eliminating the risk of cancer-causing mycotoxins in grains. Grain must be dried to have around 12% to 14% moisture content to avoid germination.

==== History ====
Grain was stored in underground silos in the early 19th century throughout southeast Europe and Asia. Bottles and jars were used in the Mediterranean region. The first written evidence of underground silos appeared in the 16th century. By the 1800s, detailed descriptions of underground silos were made in Western Europe. These writings mention airtight storage as a factor in maintaining grain quality, though some noted that the germination chance of seeds was reduced.

French industrialist Ternaux conducted early experiments on airtight storage from 1819 to 1830 at Saint-Ouen. He stored grain at a large scale in nine series of experiments. Ternaux stored the product under unfavorable circumstances; the silos were dug into a wet alluvium and the material was stored without concern for humidity. After several years, only spots of mold were encountered inside the silos, especially on the walls, roof, and bottom of the structure. The taste of the bread made with the unspoiled grain was unsatisfactory; thus, the experiments were deemed failures. these experiments are considered the first instances of scientific research on hermetic storage.

=== Worldwide usage ===
Hermetic storage is widespread in central and southern African countries such as Botswana and South Africa. Small scale farmers have benefited the most from this method. In Africa, most of the seeds are produced and stored in the farm, so effective storage methods are crucial for farmers. Experimental results have proved that seeds can retain germination and viability for twelve months under hermetic storage. Extremely harsh conditions can reduce storage lifespan.

In Botswana, an arid country, hermetic storage has helped to maintain food security in times of drought. Traditionally grains are stored in a jute bag to kill pests within a few days.

Brazilian grain producers have begun storing grains in hermetic bags instead of bins. This method is low-cost and can store grains safely for 18 months. Reflective polyether bags are used to avoid heating and degradation due to sunlight.

Grain storage capacity often falls short of production by 20 to 35 million tonnes in Argentina. This leads to grain loss during transportation. Farmers use hermetically sealed plastic bags (silo bags) to solve this issue. In the 2008 harvest season, more than 33 million tonnes of grain and oilseeds were stored using the silo bags in Argentina. This technology is being adopted by other South American countries.

Sealed bags are mostly used to store silage in North America. However, hermetic storage started to be more widely used in the early 2000s. Still, grains are mostly stored in piles on the ground during silo capacity shortages.

=== Types of hermetic storage ===
There are three main methods of hermetic storage:

1. Organic hermetic storage: Oxygen levels inside the container are depleted after a few days due to respiration.
2. Vacuum hermetic fumigation – Air within the container is sucked out.
3. Gas hermetic storage – The container is filled with carbon dioxide before storage.

In all these methods, pests are killed due to low oxygen and high carbon dioxide levels. Organic hermetic storage is the most common method.

==== Postcosecha silos ====
Postcosecha silos are galvanized steel silos. Bulk products such as maize, beans, sorghum, rice, wheat, barley, and seeds can be stored in silos. Products must be dried to or below 14% moisture content before being placed in silos to prevent fungi growth. These silos are usually built locally with simple tools, making them easy to assemble, and are sold by local artisans to the locals. The silos have a small outlet port at the base of the silo so small amounts of grain can be taken out at a time.

==== Purdue Improved Cowpea Storage (PICS) System ====
A team at Purdue University developed the Purdue Improved Cowpea Storage and promoted its use in Western Africa with funds from the Gates Foundation. This method achieves hermetic grain storage using three bags. This method is generally used for storage and transport of cowpeas, hence the name, but the method can be used on other grains. The heavy polyethylene bags with 80 μm thickness come in 50 kg or 100 kg sizes. The first polyethylene bag is filled completely and then tied securely. The first bag is then placed into a second polyethylene bag with same thickness, and that bag is tied securely as well. Finally, these two bags are placed in a third woven nylon or polypropylene bag used for its strength. Farmers and markets can handle this third bag without bursting the inner two.

==== Recycled plastic containers ====
In parts of sub-Saharan Africa, markets sell recycled plastic containers to use for hermetic storage. These containers must be checked before storage to ensure that they provide adequate airtightness.

=== Estimated cost ===
Container Type	Maize Capacity (kg)	Cost (US$)	useful life (years)	Storage Cost (US$/Mg/year)
Postcosecha silos	1360	145	25 to 40	4.26 to 2.67
PICS	100	3	3	10.00
GrainPro bags	70	3.6	5	10.00
Recycled Containers	7.74	1	3	43.06

=== Final grain quality ===
Seeds stored hermetically have been shown to retain their quality longer. Researches in Ghana investigated the effectiveness of storing seeds using three different types of grain storage. The three methods used in the research included jute, polypropylene and triple layer hermetic storage. Two destructive insects pests, adult Prostephanus truncatus and Sitophilus, were introduced in each bag. These two insects pests are common in Africa and are very destructive to maize. Of these three methods, the triple layer hermetic storage offered the best results of seed quality with prolonged germination rate and viability despite insect infestation.

Another study investigated the effect of controlling bean pests, (Acanthoscelides obtectus), on the quality of beans by employing the hermetic storage system (silo bags and plastic bottles) and non-hermetic glass containers. Beans were stored at high moisture contents of 15%, temperature 25°C and relative humidity 70±5%. In the study the hermetic method showed no alteration in quality.

Decrease of grain quality happens due to several factors: high moisture content at the time of storage, failure to keep storage bags air tight, failure to keep the bags watertight to prevent moisture infiltration and high temperatures.

=== Insect mortality ===
The mortality rate of pests increases with longer exposure to low oxygen and high CO2 levels. It also depends on temperature and the species and life stage of the pests. The table below shows the time (in hours) required to kill 90% of insects in grain stored in a low pressure hermetic storage depending on the insect species, life stage, and temperature.

Insect species	Life Stage	25 °C	33 °C	37 °C	40 °C
"T. castaneum"	Egg	19.76	10.65	7.17	3.13
"T. castaneum"	Larvae	2.54	2.51	1.91	1.37
"T. castaneum"	Pupae	10.18	8.72	6.79	2.76
"P. Interpunctella"	Egg	20.86	4.45	3.09	2.00
"P. Interpunctella"	Larvae	3.12	2.02	1.61	1.67
"P. Interpunctella"	Pupae	3.95	1.48	1.81	1.91
"R. dominica"	Egg	134.68	63.00	33.75	8.61
"R. dominica"	Larvae	63.66	35.31	14.17	4.78
"R. dominica"	Pupae	73.09	40.54	15.68	6.49
