= Amis language =

East Formosan language of Taiwan

Amis
- ʼAmis or Pangcah
- Pronunciation: [paŋt͡saʜ]
- Native to: Taiwan
- Ethnicity: 200,000 Amis (2014)
- Native speakers: 110,000 (2015)
- Language family: Austronesian: Formosan; East Formosan; Amis–Sakizaya; Amis
- Writing system: Latin (Amis alphabet)

Language codes
- ISO 639-3: ami
- Glottolog: amis1246
- IETF: ami
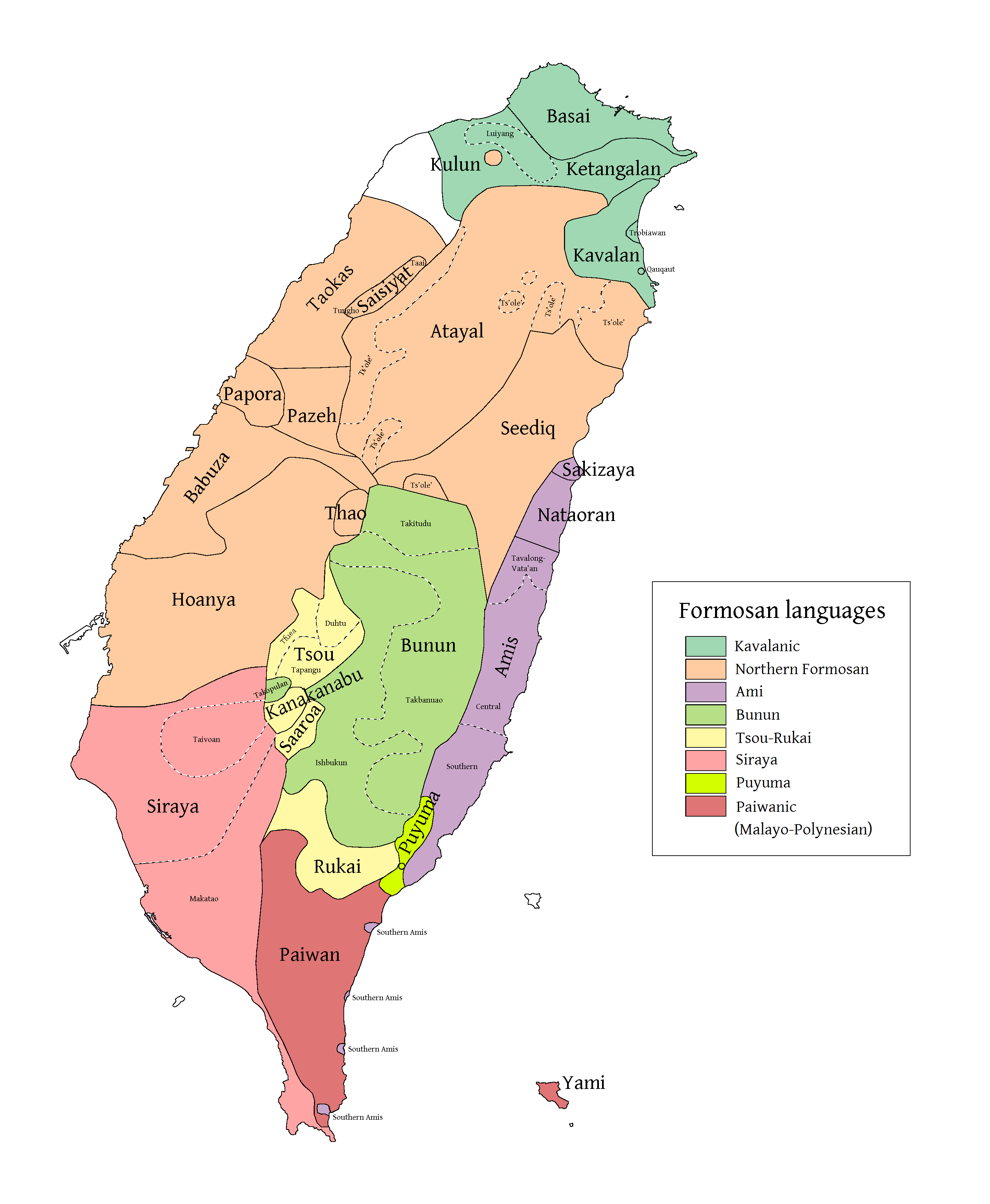
- Distribution of Amis language (purple)

- Amis is classified as Vulnerable by the UNESCO Atlas of the World's Languages in Danger

Amis (Sowal no ʼAmis or Pangcah) is a Formosan language spoken by the Amis (or Ami), an indigenous people living along the east coast of Taiwan. Amis is the largest of the Formosan languages. It is spoken between Hualien in the north and Taitung in the south, with another population of speakers in the Hengchun Peninsula near the southern end of the island. The northern varieties are considered to be separate languages.

Government services in counties where many Amis people live in Taiwan broadcast in Amis alongside Mandarin, such as at the Hualien and Taitung railway stations. However, few Amis under the age of 20 spoke the language in 1995. It is not known how many of the 200,000 ethnic Amis speak the language. A third of the aboriginal Taiwanese population speaks Amis.

== Dialects ==
Amis is a dialect cluster. There are five dialects: Southern Amis, Tavalong-Vataan, Central Amis, Chengkung-Kwangshan, and Northern Amis (Nanshi Amis, which includes Nataoran).

Sakizaya is a moribund language spoken among the northernmost ethnic Amis. It is not mutually intelligible with the Northern Amis dialect.

== Phonology ==
The following discussion covers the central dialect of Amis.

=== Consonants ===
Amis consonants
	Labial	Dental	Alveolar	Palatal	Velar	Epiglottal	Glottal
Nasals	m	n̪ ⟨n⟩			ŋ ⟨ng⟩		
Plosives and affricate	p	t̪ ⟨t⟩	t͡s ⟨c⟩		k	ʡ ~ ʢ ⟨ʼ⟩	ʔ ⟨^⟩
Fricatives	v ⟨f⟩	ð ~ ɮ̪ ⟨d⟩	s ⟨s⟩		(ɣ)^{1} ⟨g⟩	ʜ ⟨h⟩	
Trill			r ⟨r⟩				
Lateral flap			ɺ̠ ⟨l⟩				
Approximants	w ⟨w⟩			j ⟨y⟩			

1. The voiced velar fricative /ɣ/ only occurs in some loanwords, such as rigi /riˈɣiʔ/ 'ridge between sections of a rice field'.

The epiglottal consonants have proven difficult to describe, with some sources describing them as pharyngeal or even uvular as opposed to epiglottal. It is unclear if [h] is a separate phoneme from [ʜ] or if it's just an allophone of it. The voiceless pharyngeal fricative [ħ] is a word-final allophone of /ʜ/.

The voiceless plosives /p t k ʡ/ and the affricate /t͡s/ are released in clusters, so that cecay "one" is pronounced [t͡sᵊt͡saj]; as is /s/: sepat "four" is [sᵊpatʰ]. The glottal stop is an exception, frequently having no audible release in final position. The voiced fricatives, /v ɮ ɣ/ (the latter found only in loanwords) are devoiced to [f ɬ x] in utterance-final and sometimes initial position. /ɮ/ may be interdental or post-dental. The sibilants, /t͡s s/, are optionally palatalized ([t͡ɕ ɕ]) before /i/. /j/ does not occur in word-initial position. /ɺ/ is often post-alveolar, and in final position it is released: [ʡuʡuɺ̠ᵊ] "fog".

/ɮ/ shows dramatic dialectal variation. In Fengbin, a town in the center of Amis territory, it is pronounced as a median dental fricative, [ð], whereas in the town of Kangko, only 15 km (9.3 mi) away, it is a lateral [ɮ̪]. In Northern Amis, it is a plosive [d̪], which may be laxed to [ð] intervocalically. The epiglottals are also reported to have different pronunciations in the north, but the descriptions are contradictory. In Central Amis, /ʜ/ is always voiceless and /ʡ/ is often accompanied by vibrations that suggest it involves an epiglottal trill [ʢ]. Edmondson and Elsing report that these are true epiglottals initially and medially, but in utterance-final position they are epiglotto–pharyngeal.

Sakizaya, considered to be a separate language, contrasts a voiced /z/ with voiceless /s/.

In the practical orthography, /ts/ is written ⟨c⟩, /j/ ⟨y⟩, /ʡ/ ⟨ʼ⟩, /ʔ/ ⟨^⟩, /ɮ/ ⟨d⟩, /ŋ/ ⟨ng⟩, and /ʜ/ ⟨x⟩.

=== Vowels ===
Amis vowels
	Front	Central	Back
Close	i		u
Mid		(ə̆)	u
Open		a	

Amis has three common vowels, /i a u/. Despite the fact that a great deal of latitude is afforded by only needing to distinguish three vowels, Amis vowels stay close to their cardinal values, though there is more movement of /a/ and /u/ toward each other (tending to the [o] range) than there is in front-vowel space (in the [e] range).

A voiceless epenthetic schwa optionally breaks up consonant clusters, as noted above. However, there are a small number of words where a short schwa (written e) may be phonemic. No contrast involving the schwa is known, and if it is also epenthetic, then Amis has words with no phonemic vowels at all. Examples of this e are malmes "sad", pronounced [maɺə̆mːə̆s], and ’nem "six", pronounced [ʡnə̆m] or [ʡə̆nə̆m].

=== Stress ===
Stress regularly falls on the final syllable.

== Grammar ==
Amis verbs have several inflections, including existential clause, active voice, passive voice, disposal sentence, imperative mood, optative mood, and prohibitive mood.

=== Case markers ===
Cases are marked by case particles.

	Neutral	Nominative	Accusative	Genitive
Common	o/u	ko	to	no
Personal (singular)	ci	ci	ci ... an	ni
Personal (plural)	ca	ca	ca ... an	na

=== Syntax ===
There are two word orders in Amis called "General" Word Order and "Special" Word Order.

Below are some examples of Amis sentence:

==== "General" Word Order Sentence I : Verb–subject ====
Verb	Subject
Verb, Adjective, etc.	Preposition for Subjects + Nouns

===== Example =====
- Maomahay ci wama. (The father is working in the field.)
  - mimaomahay: working (in the field)
  - ci: subject preposition for personal proper noun
  - wama: father
- Misaholoay ci wina. (The mother is cooking rice.)
  - misaholoay: cooking (rice)
  - ina/wina: mother

==== "General" Word Order Sentence II : Verb–subject–object ====
Verb	Subject	Object
Verb, Adjective, etc.	Preposition for Subjects + Nouns	Preposition for Objects + Nouns

===== Example =====
- Mifacaʼ ko kaying to rikoʼ. (The young woman is washing clothes.)
- Mifacaʼ koya kaying to rikoʼ. (That young woman is washing clothes.)
  - mifacaʼ: wash (clothes)
  - ko: subject preposition for common nouns
  - kaying: young woman
  - to: object preposition for common nouns
  - rikoʼ/fudoy: clothes

== Vocabulary ==
=== Comparison ===
Comparisons of Amis with English and other Austronesian languages
Amis	English	Tagalog	Pangasinan	Kapampangan	Ilocano	Javanese	Sundanese	Malay
cecay	one	isa	sakey	isa	maysa	siji	hiji	satu
tosa	two	dalawa	dua	adwa	dua	loro	dua	dua
tolo	three	tatlo	talo	atlo	tallo	telu	tilu	tiga
sepat	four	apat	apat	apat	uppat	papat	opat	empat
lima	five	lima	lima	lima	lima	lima	lima	lima
ʼenem	six	anim	anem	anam	inem	enem	genep	enam
pito	seven	pito	pito	pitu/pito	pito	pitu	tujuh	tujuh
falo	eight	walo	walo	walu/walo	walo	wolu	dalapan	delapan
siwa	nine	siyam	siyam	siam	siam	sanga	salapan	sembilan
poloʼ	ten	sampu	samplo	apulu/apulo	sangapulo	sepuluh	sapuluh	sepuluh
lotong	monkey	unggoy			bakes	lutung	lutung	lotong/lutung
fafoy	pig	baboy		babi	baboy	babi	babi	babi
wacu	dog	aso	aso	asu	aso	asu	anjing/guguk	asu

- Maolah kako a mimali = I like to play sports.
- Takaraw ko pitaʼkod = I jump very high.
- Kalamkam ko kacomikay = I run very fast.
- Ira ko tataʼangay a mata ako = I have big eyes
- mamangay a ngoyos = A small mouth
- takayaʼay a fokes = long hair
- Sowal san ko kahacecay to makapahay a tamdaw kako = Everyone tells me that I am beautiful.
- Mafanaʼay a miasik, misawsaw to kaysing, milidong to fodoy = I can sweep the floor, wash dishes and clothing.
- Maolah a midemak kako to tayal no lomaʼ = I love to do household chores.
- nawhani maolah kako to lomaʼ no mako = Because I love my home.

== Toponyms ==
Sing ʼOlam (2011:300–301) lists the following Amis names for villages and towns in Hualien County and Taitung County of eastern Taiwan.

- Jialiwan 加里灣: Kaliyawan
- Hualien 花蓮: Kalingko
- Boboshe 薄薄社: Pokpok
- Tianpu 田埔: Natawran
- Taichang 太昌: Miyamay
- Nanhua 南華: Mafuwakay
- Geliu 歌柳: Keliw
- Chinan 池南: Fanaw
- Shoufeng 壽豐: Rinahem
- Dongxing 東興: Cihafayan
- Shanxing 山興: Cirakayan
- Fenglin 鳳林: Cingaloan
- Changqiao 長橋: Cirihan
- Jialidong 加禮洞: Kalotongan
- Matai'an 馬太鞍: Fataʼan
- Taibalang 太巴塱: Tafalong
- Fuyuan 富源: Paʼilasen
- Qimei 奇美: Kiwit
- Wurao 梧繞: ʼOlaw
- Hegang 鶴岡: ʼOlalip
- Ruiliang 瑞良: Fanaw
- Wuhe 舞鶴: Maʼifor
- Lingya 苓雅 / Xiadewu 下德武: Lingacay / Satefo
- Chunri 春日: Kohkoh
- Lüfu 呂福: Mancelan
- Gongqian 宮前: Makotaay
- Dongchang 東昌: Lidaw
- Lanliao 鹽寮: Tomay
- Shuilian 水漣: Ciwidian
- Yuemei 月眉: ʼApalo
- Jiqi 磯崎: Karoroan
- Xinshe 新社: Paterongan
- Gongxia 宮下: Mararoong
- Fengfu 豐富: Tingalaw
- Baliwan 八里灣: Faliyol
- Fengbin 豐濱: Fakong
- Lide 立德: Kudic
- Gangkou 港口: Makotaay
- Jingpu 靜浦: Cawiʼ
- Zhangyuan 樟原: Koladot
- Dajulai 大俱來: Tapwaray
- Zhenbing 真柄: Makrahay
- Changguang 長光: Ciwkangan
- Yongfu 永福: Mornos
- Nanzhuhu 南竹湖: Pakaraʼac
- Baisang'an 白桑安: Pasongan
- Jinnalujiao 僅那鹿角: Kinanoka
- Wushibi 烏石鼻: Cidatayay
- Danman 膽曼: Taʼman
- Yiwan 宜灣: Saʼaniwan
- Shanxia 山下: Tokar
- Gaoliao 高寮: Takoliyaw
- Yuli 玉里: Posko
- Tiefen 鐵份: Afih
- Lehe 樂合: Harawan
- Antong 安通: Angcoh
- Wanning 萬寧: Malingpo
- Dongzhu 東竹: Talampo
- Xuetian 學田: Mali^wang
- Fengnan 豐南: Cilamitay
- Chishang 池上: Fanaw
- Taiyuan 泰源: Alapawan
- Degao 德高: Takofan
- Ruiyuan 瑞源: Fong
- Luye 鹿野: Palayapay
- Liji 利吉: Dikidiki
- Kangle 康樂: Ining
- Fengli 豐里: Arapanay
- Bo'ai 博愛: Tomiyac
- Zhongxiao 忠孝: Mararoong
- Sanxiantai 三仙台: Pisirian
- Chenggong 成功: Madawdaw
- Zhongren 忠仁: Cilikesay
- Heping 和平: Kahciday
- Jiaping 嘉平: Kanalatip
- Fengtian 豐田: Paongong
- Duli 都歷: Torik
- Xiaoma 小馬: Teraʼ
- Dongho 東河: Fafokod
- Longchang 隆昌: Kaningafar
- Xingchang 興昌: Paʼanifong
- Dulan 都蘭: ʼAtolan
- Jialulan 加路蘭: Karoroan
- Malan 馬蘭: Falangaw
- Taitung 台東: Posong
- Madan 馬旦: Matang

== Sample text ==
Article 1 of the Universal Declaration of Human Rights translated into Pangcah:

- Chiyu mahufuchay tu tamlaw, maemin pingdeng ichunyan a kngli. Iraay chaira lishing a naay a naay a harateng, pimaulahsha u harateng nu kaka shafa.
- English: All human beings are born free and equal in dignity and rights. They are endowed with reason and conscience and should act towards one another in a spirit of brotherhood.
