= Amis harvest festivals =

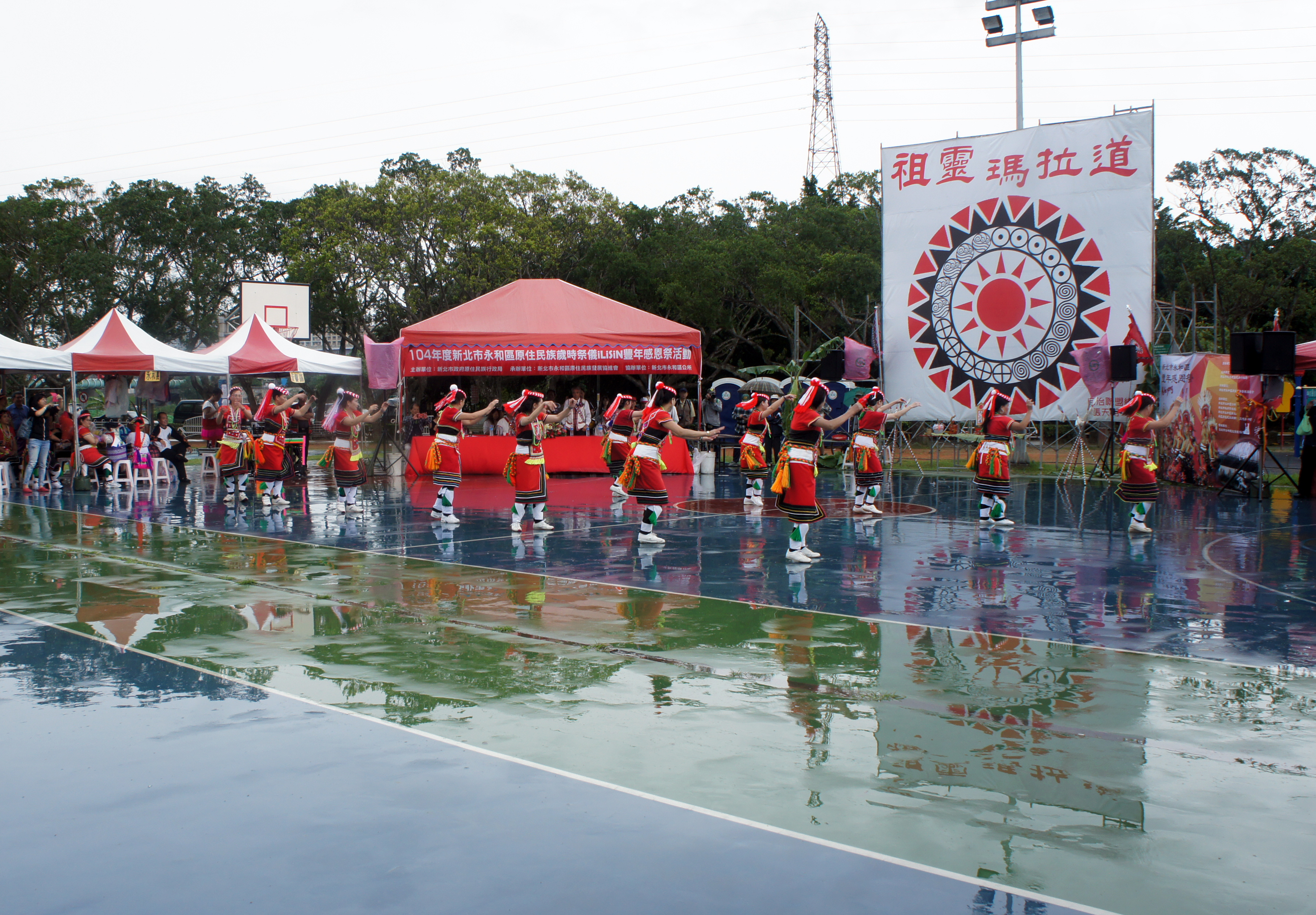
2015 Yonghe District Joint New Year Festival

The Amis people of Taiwan celebrate many small and larger harvest festivals and ceremonies through the year.

== Background ==
The “Harvest Festival”, also known as the “Harvest Ceremony”, is one of the most important festival for indigenous tribes in Taiwan and it is held to celebrate the harvest. The ceremony lasts approximately seven days. The “Harvest Festival” is held during July, August, and September. Normally, different tribes will select different times to celebrate in the same area. Previously, the main purpose of the festival was to pray to the ancestral gods to bless successfully harvested crops, and to wish for a bumper grain harvest, growth of population and stock breeding in the coming year. After the rituals, people gather for dinner, dancing, a camp-fire party and games. Currently, besides the worship of ancestors and gods, the celebration of the Harvest Festival is also an important program to attract the increasing number of tourists.

Amis Harvest Festival is held on the full moon day after the autumn harvest. In the past, in order to celebrate the harvest of millet, the ceremony was held after the reaping of the millet. Since rice has become the main crop for Amis, now the ceremony is held after the gathering of rice. The Amis in the Taitung area celebrates in lunar July; the one in Hualien area celebrates in lunar August. The characteristics of celebration for different tribes are varied, and the duration for celebration is also different from just one day for some tribes to seven days for other tribes. At that time, the men and women, the young and old wearing festival costumes, led by a singer, dance with hand in hand. The young Amis men and women will take singing and dancing as an important thing for them to choose their partners. When a girl finds a boy she likes, she will actively stand by the boy and dance with him.

The Amis Harvest Festival has very important meaning in respecting their ancestors and creating new life. In tribes of Amis, men bear the important task of making sure their tribe is safe. Attending the adult ceremony is a major milestone for boys becoming adults. All men in the tribe are divided into six groups: children, adolescents, warriors, the fathers of the youth, elders and chieftains. Each group takes different responsibility in the tribe. In the party of the ceremony, the elder people sit in the middle and the youths will dance around the elders and propose a toast with the elders. The one who has the potential to be the next chief of the tribe will be selected through this activity.

== The priest ==
The ceremony will be hosted by the priest of the tribe, who is in charge of the sacrificial ritual. Since all the ceremonies of the Amis are closely related to the farming stuffs, the responsibility of the priest is to instruct the activities of plowing, sowing, weeding, and harvesting and so on. It is necessary for a priest to know the calendar, the weather, the history of the tribe, the dancing and how to communicate with the gods. Therefore, the priest is a knowledgeable and wise man.

== The preparation of the ceremony ==
Before the ceremony, the leader of the tribe will call the members of the “kaput” to discuss the details of the ceremony such as deciding the day of ceremony, collecting the fee for the dinner party and so on. Then he begins to purchase the stuffs which are needed during the celebration. According to the traditional custom, the beef should be the main dish for the big dinner party “malafi”, and the number of cows butchered should be decided by the number of the tribes. The “kaput” of the current “pakalogay” will take the charge of butchering the cows.

== The day of inviting guests ==
According to the traditional custom of the Amis, the day before the ceremony, the tribe which is charge of holding the celebration will send the young men to other tribes to invite important guests to attend.

== The Big Dinner “Malafi Ko Niyaro” ==
Attending dinner is a traditional custom for the Amis in Harvest Festival. It is a great opportunity for all the members of the tribe to meet and strengthen their relationship. Before the night of ceremony, the big dinner must be held and all the members of the tribe should attend it, because this is the way to unite the members of the tribe.

== The Clothes of Amis ==
There are two types of clothes of the Amis: one is dressed in common days, and the other is dressed in the festival. The Harvest Festival is an important day for the Amis. In this day they will dress their festival clothes to attend the ceremony. They will wear hats which are decorated with the feathers of roosters and the number of the feather symbols the status of the one in the tribe.

== Dancing and Singing ==
The dancing and singing are a necessary element of the celebration of the Harvest Festival. The songs are regarded as the media through which the people communicate with the soul of the ancestors and the god. The songs of ceremony are unchangeable and serious. Because of the different locations, ancestors and gods, the dancing and singing varies among tribes of Amis. The songs of the adults and children are also different. The lyrics of the children's song tend to be imaginary and the one of adults are more relevant to the things in reality, such as fishing, farming and so on. The form of the singing is that one person leads a chorus and others follow. In terms of dancing, usually the people dance hand in hand in a circle, so that they can keep away the 'bad soul' from the party. The movements in the dance are mostly walking, running and jumping. Generally speaking, the dance movements around coastal areas are more complicated and changeable than tribes in mountainous areas. The representative dancing around the harbour areas is “Makotaay”.

== The Dinner Party of Respecting the Elders ==
The elders are well respected by Amis. On one hand, the young people of Amis show their respect to the elders and to learn for them. On the other hand, the elders will exam the young men to select one who has the potential capability to be next leader of the tribe.

== The Adult Ceremony ==
In indigenous tribes in Taiwan, the age structure of males is always at the center of all concern, because the age structure of males is the key in deciding the tribe's social rules, moral education, learning ability and the capability to protect the tribe from the invasion of other tribes. The age structure could be generally divided into three groups: the elder, the adult and the adolescents. Before being an adult, the teenager should be trained and go through kinds of tests. Therefore, the Adult Ceremony has the significant meaning for Amis.

Because of the different custom of each tribe, the interval of the adult ceremony is held differently from once every three years to once every eight years. The adult ceremony is an important part of the Harvest Festival. The age bracket of the male participants is from thirteen to twenty. In the past, the one who attends the ceremony must live in the hall of the tribe and be trained about two weeks. The mother or the girlfriend of the participant will prepare the wine, cakes and clothes for him after he gets promotion during the period of training. The candidates will learn life skills and obedience during the training. After the adult ceremony, they would become the real men of the tribe.

In the day of ceremony, the candidates take a barrel of wine and a chick from their house to the certain place. The elders and the priest will read the good words to them and wish them good luck. Race of running is the special test for them, and passing this program would be the symbol of one being an adult and having the ability to serve the tribe.

== The Night of Valentine’s Day ==
The night of Valentine's Day is the last night of the Harvest Festival. It involves young people selecting their partners. The girls and boys dance around the campfire under the moonlight and confess to the one whom she or he loves. This activity will last to the next morning. During the activity, all of the young men have a bag on their backs and dance together. Then all the young women join to dance with them. Later, a girl puts the betel into the bag of the boy she likes. If the boy also likes her, he will give his bag to the girl. They then become a couple later.
