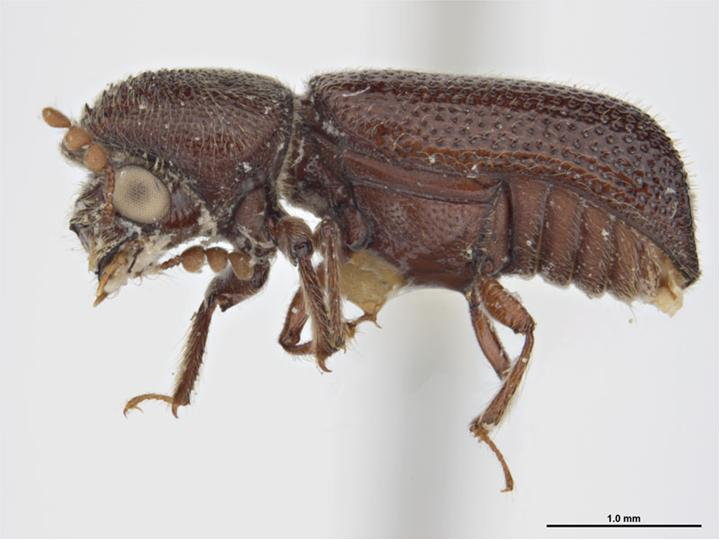

Scientific classification
- Domain: Eukaryota
- Kingdom: Animalia
- Phylum: Arthropoda
- Class: Insecta
- Order: Coleoptera
- Suborder: Polyphaga
- Family: Bostrichidae
- Genus: Prostephanus
- Species: P. truncatus

Binomial name
- Prostephanus truncatus (Horn, 1878)

Synonyms
- Dinoderus truncatus Horn, 1878

= Prostephanus truncatus =

Species of beetle

Prostephanus truncatus is commonly referred to as larger grain borer (LGB) with reference to the related Rhyzopertha dominica, which is relatively smaller, and referred to as the lesser grain borer. P. truncatus is about 6 mm (0.24 in) long as compared to 3 mm (0.12 in) long in R. dominica. At optimum conditions of 80% relative humidity and 32 °C (90 °F), and available food, P. truncatus completes its lifecycle within 27 days. It is a serious pest of dried grains, especially maize and dried cassava in West Africa. This beetle is believed to have been introduced into West Africa through food aid from America. It reached Africa through Tanzania in the early 1970s.

LGB attacks maize right from the field and continues in the store. It also feeds on wood, plastics, storage bags and cassava. LGB bores into the grain, and feeds, leaving an empty shell, while the weevil only feeds on the heart of the grain. LGB also lives in the granary (unmudded “nkhokwe”), especially in old maize granaries, and is ready to attack as soon as maize is placed into the store. LGB finds it difficult to enter dry maize.

== Management ==
=== Prevention ===
Resistant varieties of maize are available. In Kenya, varieties EMB 0702 for are suitable for medium altitude, and MTPEH0701 and M/0702 are suitable for the coastal region

Removal and burning any plant residue from previously infested fields can be conducted to prevent P. truncatus infestation. Used sacks can be immersed in boiling water to eliminate residue infestations

CABI recommends harvesting early before the borer gets into the grain. They also advise harvesting the maize as soon as the black layer has formed between the tip of the maize grain and the cob. P. truncatus finds it harder to burrow into dry crops, therefore, leaving crops until they are very dry can reduce infestation.

For cassava, infestation from the larger grain borer can be prevented by removal of any plant residue from the previous harvest if the pest is known to be in the area. Leaving cassava roots in the ground for longer reduces storage time and chances for the borer to infest.

Storing crops in airtight metal silos instead of bags and other easily accessible materials can also help prevent infestation. Infestation can also be reduced reducing storage time and by storing maize dried leaves of plants that repel the borer e.g. dried lantana or eucalyptus leaves.

=== Monitoring ===
Pheromone traps can be used in susceptible areas to monitor populations. Careful sampling and examination of grains enables detection of low infestation levels. This can be conducted by inspecting holes and cracks where adults can hide and using a box sieve with a mesh of 1 to 2 mm to separate the insects and the grains.

=== Direct control ===
Biocontrol methods such as the predatory beetle Teretrius nigrescens can be used to control the spread of P. truncatus .

Chemical control methods can also be used to control P. truncatus.

== Sources ==
This article incorporates text from a free content work. Licensed under CC-BY-SA (license statement/permission). Text taken from Plantwise Factsheets for Farmers: Control of larger grain borer in stored maize, Charles Diverson Singano, CABI.

This article incorporates text from a free content work. Licensed under CC-BY-SA (license statement/permission). Text taken from PMDG: Larger Grain Borer on Maize - Kenya, Rahab Magoti, Eunice Sakong and Samuel Mburu, CABI.

This article incorporates text from a free content work. Licensed under CC-BY-SA (license statement/permission). Text taken from PMDG Green List: Larger grain borer on cassava, Plantwise, CABI.

This article incorporates text from a free content work. Licensed under CC-BY-SA (license statement/permission). Text taken from PMDG Green List: Larger grain borer on Maize, Plantwise, CABI.

This article incorporates text from a free content work. Licensed under CC-BY-SA (license statement/permission). Text taken from PMDG Green and Yellow List: Large grain borer (LGB) of maize, Henry Msatilomo and Joyce Nthenda, CABI.
