= Sakizaya language =

East Formosan language of eastern Taiwan

Sakizaya
- Native to: Taiwan
- Ethnicity: 990 Sakizaya (2020)
- Native speakers: 590 (2020)
- Language family: Austronesian: East Formosan; Amis–Sakizaya; Sakizaya
- Writing system: Latin (Sakizaya alphabet)

Language codes
- ISO 639-3: szy
- Glottolog: saki1247
- ELP: Sakizaya
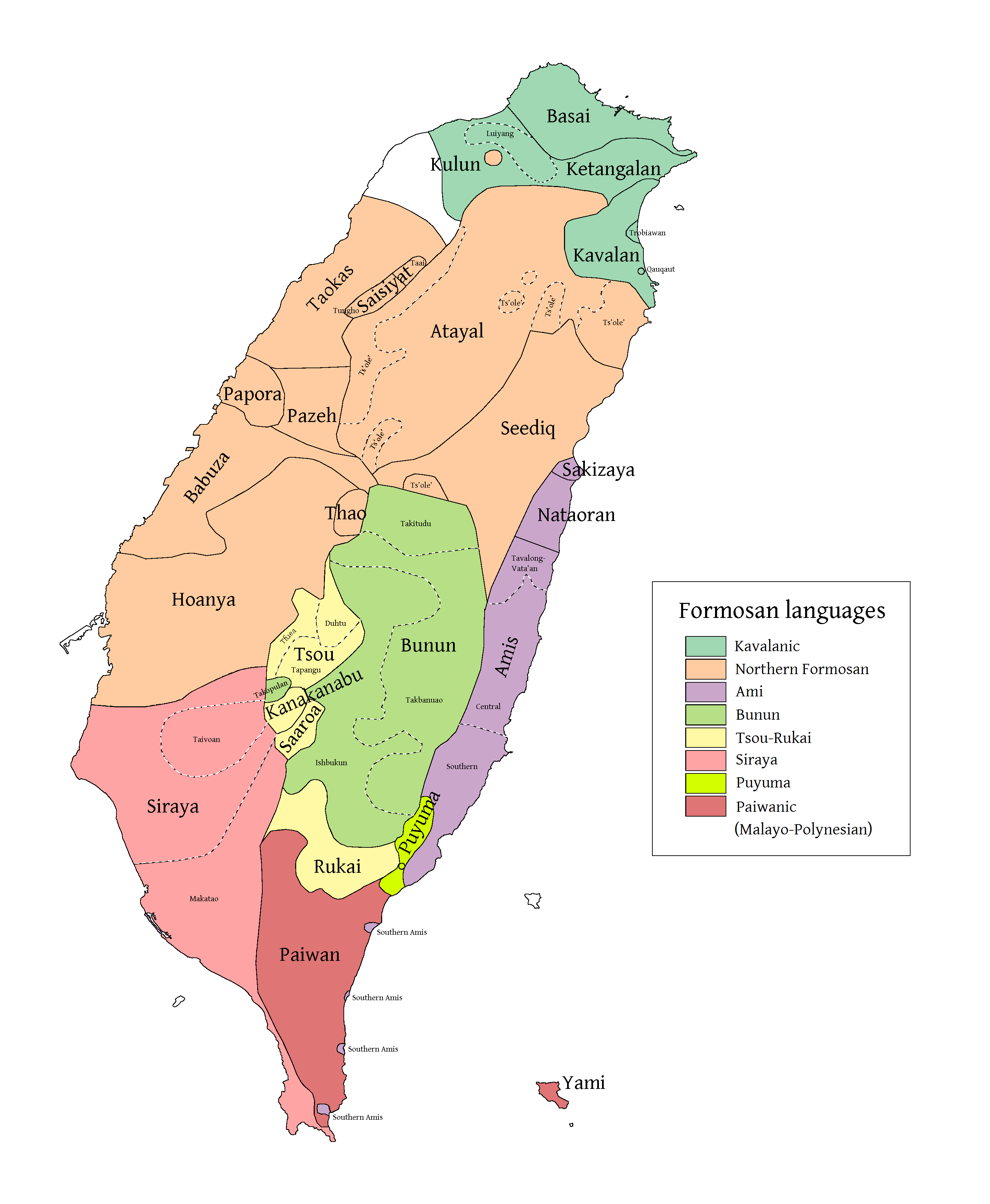
- (purple) Greater Ami. Nataoran and Sakizaya are in the north.

- Sakizaya is classified as Critically Endangered by the UNESCO Atlas of the World's Languages in Danger

Sakizaya is a Formosan language closely related to Amis. One of the large family of Austronesian languages, it is spoken by the Sakizaya people, who are concentrated on the eastern Pacific coast of Taiwan. Since 2007 they have been recognized by the Taiwan government as one of the sixteen distinct indigenous groups on the island.

== History ==
After the Takobowan incident of 1878, the Sakizaya people hid among the Nataoran Amis. Scholars thus mistakenly categorised the Sakizaya language as a dialect of Amis.

In 2002, the Center of Aboriginal Studies of National Chengchi University in Taiwan corrected this error when they edited the indigenous language textbooks. That year, the Sakizaya language was designated both as a Chilai and Amis sublanguage. Both are included in the family of Austronesian languages. On 17 January 2007, the Sakizaya community became the thirteenth distinct indigenous ethnic group recognised by the Taiwanese government.

A total of 1246 people are registered as Sakizaya. They live primarily in the Takubuwan, Sakur, Maifor and Kaluluwan communities. Thousands of other Sakizaya are still registered as Amis, based on historic classifications. Around half of Amis politicians in Hualien City, the biggest city in the Amis area, are said to be ethnic Sakizaya.

== Phonology ==
=== Consonants ===
		Labial	Alveolar	Palatal	Velar	Epiglottal	Glottal
Nasal		m	n		ŋ		
Plosive	voiceless	p	t		k	ʡ	(ʔ)
Plosive	voiced	b	d		(ɡ)		
Affricate			ts				
Fricative	voiceless	(f)	s		(x)		h
Fricative	voiced		z				
Lateral			l				
Approximant		w		j			

- /ɡ/ may also occur, but is rare.
- Sounds /ʡ/ and /h/ may also be heard as [x] and [ʔ] in free variation.
- /ts, s, z/ are palatalized as [tɕ, ɕ, ʑ] when preceding front sounds /i, j/.
- /b/ may also be heard interchangeably as [f] among speakers.
- /l/ may also be heard as [r] when in word-final position. /d/ may also be heard as [r] in intervocalic position.

=== Vowels ===
	Front	Central	Back
Close	i		u
Mid		ə	o
Open		a	

== See also ==
- Sakizaya people

== Bibliography ==
- Chen, Chun-nan 陳俊男 (2010). Sāqíláiyǎzú de shèhuì wénhuà yǔ mínzú rèndìng 撒奇萊雅族的社會文化與民族認定 [Study of Sakizaya Culture and Official Recognition] (PhD thesis) (in Chinese). Guoli zhengzhi daxue.
- Chen, Chun-nan 陳俊男 (1999). Qíláizú (Sakizayarén) de yánjiū 奇萊族（Sakizaya人）的研究 [The Study of Qilai (Sakizaya people)] (Master's thesis) (in Chinese). Guoli zhengzhi daxue.
- Lim, Siu-theh 林修澈. Sakizayazú de mínzú rèndìng: Qímò bàogào (Xíngzhèng Yuàn Yuánzhùmínzú Wěiyuánhuì wěituō) Sakizaya族的民族認定：期末報告（行政院原住民族委員會委託） [Sakizaya Nationality Identification: Final Report (Commissioned by the Indigenous Peoples Committee of the Executive Yuan)] (Report) (in Chinese). Taipei: Zhengzhi daxue minzu xuexi.
- Shen, Wen-chi 沈文琦 (2018). Sāqíláiyǎyǔ yǔfǎ gàilùn 撒奇萊雅語語法概論 [Introduction to Sakizaya Grammar] (in Chinese). Xinbei Shi: Yuanzhuminzu weiyuanhui. ISBN 978-986-05-5693-3 – via alilin.apc.gov.tw.
