= List of Indigenous peoples of Taiwan =

Families of Formosan languages before Chinese colonization, per Blust. Malayo-Polynesian (red) may lie within Eastern Formosan (purple). The white section in the northwest of the country does not indicate a complete absence of aboriginal people from that part of Taiwan.

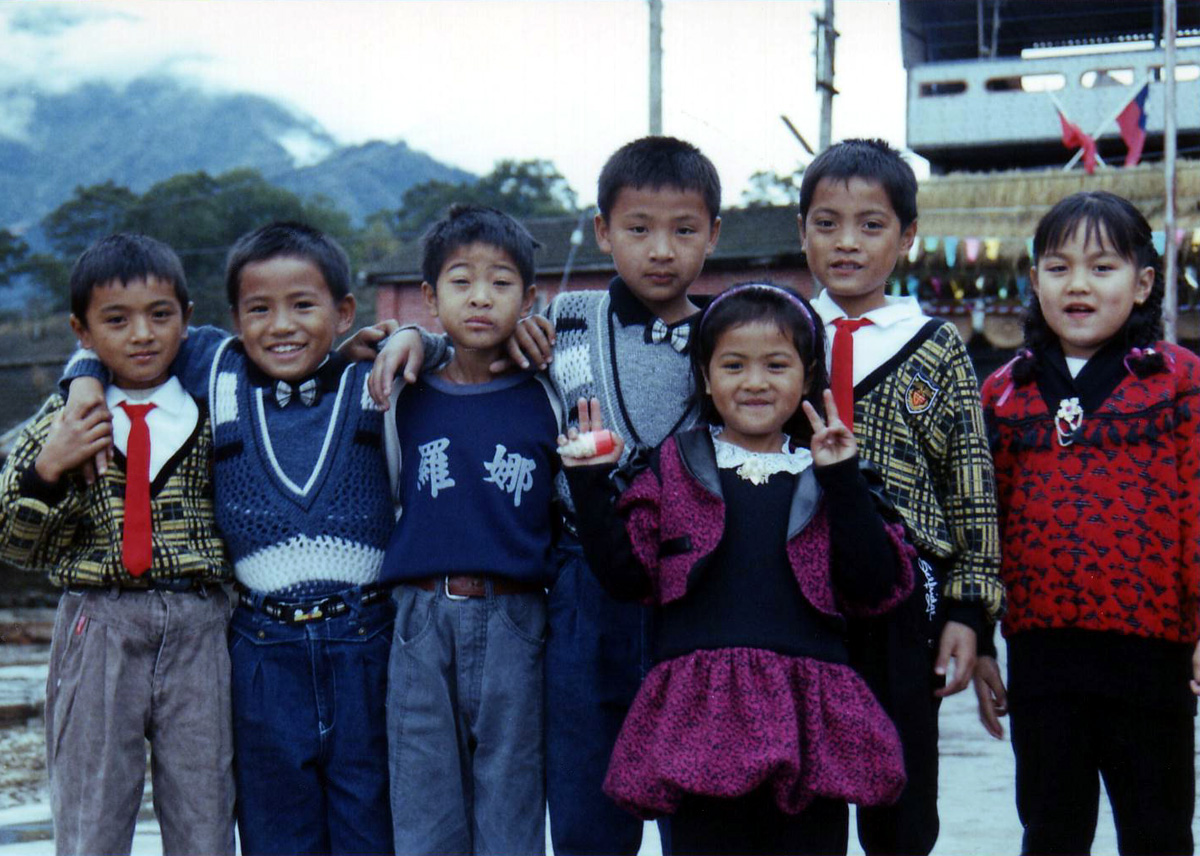
Young residents in the Bunun village of Lona, Taiwan dress up for the traditional Christmas holiday (not an official holiday in Taiwan).

There are 26 officially recognized Taiwanese indigenous peoples, including 16 fully recognized and 10 additional plains indigenous peoples currently in the process of receiving full recognition.

Languages and cultures of indigenous tribes were recorded by the government of Dutch Formosa, Spanish Formosa and the Qing Empire. Research on ethnic groups of Taiwanese indigenous peoples started in late 19th century, when Taiwan was under Japanese rule. The Government of Taiwan (臺灣總督府, Taiwan Sōtokufu) conducted large amount of research and further distinguished the ethnic groups of Taiwanese indigenous peoples by linguistics (see Formosan languages). The following is a list of classifications through Japanese and post World War II. The Japanese names in parentheses do not exist in pre-World War II Japanese demographic research.

== Recognized indigenous peoples ==
The Taiwanese government officially recognises 16 indigenous groups.

Name	Formosan native name	Chinese (after 1945)	Japanese (before 1945)	Notes	Population
Amis	Pangcah, 'Amis	阿美族	アミ族、阿眉族	Recognized since Japanese era	219,739
Atayal	Tayal, Tayan	泰雅族	タイヤル族、大么族	Recognized since Japanese era	95,551
Bunun	Bunun	布農族	ブヌン族、ヴォヌム族、武崙族	Recognized since Japanese era	61,507
Kanakanavu	Kanakanavu	卡那卡那富族	カナカナブ族	Classified as Tsou, recognized since 2014	495
Kavalan	Kebalan, Kbaran	噶瑪蘭族、加禮宛族	カバラン族	Classified as Amis, recognized since 2002	1,579
Paiwan	Kacalisian	排灣族	パイワン族	Recognized since Japanese era	106,312
Puyuma	Pinuyumayan	卑南族、比努優瑪樣族	プユマ族、彪馬族	Recognized since Japanese era	15,200
Rukai	Drekay	魯凱族	ルカイ族、ツァリセン族	Recognized since Japanese era	13,788
Saaroa	Hla'alua	拉阿魯哇族	サアロア族、四社生蕃	Classified as Tsou, recognized since 2014	528
Saisiyat	Say-Siyat	賽夏族、獅設族	サイシャット族	Recognized since Japanese era	6,886
Sakizaya	Sakizaya	撒奇萊雅族、奇萊族	（サキザヤ族）	Classified as Amis, recognized since 2007	1,054
Seediq	Seediq	賽德克族	セデック族、紗績族	Classified as Atayal, recognized since 2008	11,063
Taroko	Truku	太魯閣族	（タロコ族）	Classified as Atayal, recognized since 2004	34,022
Thao	Thau	邵族、水沙連族	サオ族	Classified as Tsou, recognized since 2001	852
Tsou	Cou	鄒族、曹族	ツォウ族、新高族	Recognized since Japanese era	6,750
Tao (Yami)	Tao	達悟族、雅美族	ヤミ族	Recognized since Japanese era	4,845

== Partially recognized and unrecognized indigenous peoples ==
Peoples that have undergone heavy Sinicization have not received full recognition by the central government. They are traditionally referred to as "plains" indigenous peoples and were considered fully extinct or assimilated into the Han Chinese culture. The Sinicization increases the difficulty in identifying ethnic groups. The languages spoken by some of these groups have gone extinct, though some are in revitilazation. Following a constitutional court judgement in 2022, a law was passed in 2025 to allow these peoples to apply for official recognition by the central government. As of 2026, ten groups are applying for the recognition.

Name	Formosan native name	Chinese (after 1945)	Japanese (before 1945)	Notes
Arikun	Arikun	阿立昆族	アリクン族	Sometimes classified as Hoanya
Babuza	Babuza, Poavasa	貓霧拺族、巴布薩族	バブザ族	Applying for official recognition as of 2026.
Basay	Basay, Basai	巴賽族、馬塞族	（バサイ族）	Sometimes classified as Ketagalan.
Hoanya	Hoanya	洪雅族、和安雅族、荷安耶族	ホアニヤ族	Sometimes split into Lloa and Arikun
Kaxabu	Kaxabu, Kahapu	噶哈巫族	（カハブ族）	Sometimes classified as Pazeh. In Applying for official recognition as of 2026.
Ketagalan	Ketagalan	凱達格蘭族	ケタガラン族	Applying for official recognition as of 2026.
Kulon	Kulon	龜崙族	（クーロン族）	
Lloa	Lloa	羅亞族、魯羅阿族	ロッア族	Sometimes classified Hoanya
Luilang	Luilang	雷朗族	ルイラン族	Sometimes classified as Ketagalan
Makatao	Makatao, Tao	馬卡道族	マカット族、タッオ族	Sometimes classified as Siraya. Recognized in Pingtung. Applying for official recognition as of 2026.
Papora	Papora, Vupuran	拍瀑拉族、巴布拉族、巴波拉族	パポラ族	
Pazeh	Pazéh, Pazih	巴宰族、巴則海族、拍宰海族	パゼッヘ族	Applying for official recognition as of 2026.
Qauqaut	Qauqaut	猴猴族	(カウカット族)	
Siraya	Siraya	西拉雅族、希萊耶族	シラヤ族	Recognized in Tainan and Fuli. Applying for official recognition as of 2026.
Taivoan	Taivoan, Taivuan	大武壠族、大滿族	（タイボアン族）	Sometimes classified as Siraya. Recognized in Fuli. Applying for official recognition as of 2026.
Taokas	Taokas	道卡斯族、斗葛族、大甲族	タオカス族	Applying for official recognition as of 2026.
Favorlang	Favorlang, Vavorolang	虎尾壟族、費佛朗族、華武壟族、法波蘭族、法佛朗族	ファボラン族	
Trobiawan	Trobiawan, TuRbuan	哆囉美遠族、哆囉布安族	(トルビアワン族)	Sometimes classified as Ketagalan

== "Mountain" and "plains" indigenous peoples ==
The colonial governments traditionally classified the indigenous people into two groups, the "mountains" and the "plains" indigenous peoples. Though the terms superficially refer to the altitude of their places of residence, the actual basis is the level of Sinicization, and traces its roots to Qing Dynasty separation of the "civilized" (熟番) from the "uncivilized" (生番). This categorization has no correlation to ethnic, cultural, or linguistic similarity. Due to this subjectivity, the grouping have changed over the years. The Saisiyat people was previously considered a plains indigenous people, but later recategorized as mountains indigenous people. The Kavalan and Thao peoples are similarly inconsistentnly seens as either mountains or plains indigenous peoples.

The household registration records during Japanese rule include remarks of "mountains/plains indigenous peoples". The governmental statistics also listed 9 recognized subgroups under mountains indigenous peoples. However, the ROC government after World War II refused to recognize the plains indigenous peoples until 2025.

Name	Chinese	Hokkien	Hakka	Japanese (1935–1945)
Mountains indigenous peoples	高山族	Ko-suann-co̍k	Kô-sân-chu̍k	高砂族（たかさごぞく, Takasago-zoku）
Plains indigenous peoples	平埔族	Pênn-poo-co̍k	Phìn-phû-chu̍k	平埔族（へいほぞく, Heiho-zoku）

== See also ==
- Taiwanese people
- Taiwanese indigenous peoples
- Demographics of Taiwan
- Culture of Taiwan
- Languages of Taiwan
- Formosan languages
