= Demographics of Taiwan =

- Population pyramid of Taiwan
- Population: 23,243,565 (June 2026)
- Growth rate: 0.04% (2022 est.)
- Birth rate: 5.8 births/1,000 population (2023 est.)
- Death rate: 8.8 deaths/1,000 population (2023 est.)
- Life expectancy: 81.16 years
  - male: 78.17 years
  - female: 84.34 years
- Fertility rate: 0.695 children born/woman (2025 est.)
- Infant mortality: 3.97 deaths/1,000 live births
- Net migration rate: 0.85 migrant(s)/1,000 population (2022 est.)
- Immigrant share: 4.9% (2024)

Age structure
- 0–14 years: 11.51% (in December, 2025)
- 15–64 years: 68.43% (in December, 2025)
- 65 and over: 20.06% (in December, 2025)

Sex ratio
- Total: 0.97 male(s)/female (2022 est.)
- At birth: 1.074 male(s)/female (2024)
- Under 15: 1.075 male(s)/female
- 65 and over: 0.73 male(s)/female

Nationality
- Nationality: Taiwanese
- Major ethnic: ▼ Han Taiwanese (95%); Hoklo Taiwanese (N/D); Hakka Taiwanese (N/D); Others (N/D)
- Minor ethnic: ▼ Indigenous Taiwanese (2.5%); ▲ New immigrant in Taiwan (2.5%)

Language
- Official: Mandarin

The population of Taiwan is approximately 23.36 million as of April 2025. According to governmental statistics, in the early 21st century, 95% to 97% of Taiwan's population are Han Chinese, while about 2.3% are Taiwanese of Austronesian ethnicity. Half the population are followers of one or a mixture of 25 recognized religions.

Immigration of Han Chinese to the Penghu Islands started as early as the 12th century. The main island was inhabited by a diversity of Taiwanese indigenous peoples speaking Austronesian languages until Han settlement began in the early 17th century. Soon after, more Han workers mainly from the Minnan region arrived to work in the colony of Dutch Formosa in the southwest of Taiwan. After the Dutch were defeated, the Kingdom of Tungning maintained a significant population of Han settlers in the tens of thousands until the Qing dynasty took over. Under Qing rule, the Han population in Taiwan increased from about 50,000 in the mid-17th century to 2.5 million by 1893. The total population of Taiwan increased to 6.5 million under Japanese rule by 1945.

During the 20th century, the population of Taiwan rose more than sevenfold, from about 3 million in 1905 to more than 22 million by 2001. This high growth was caused by a combination of factors, such as very high fertility rates up to the 1960s, and low mortality rates. In addition, there was a surge in population as the Chinese Civil War ended and the Kuomintang (KMT) forces retreated, bringing an influx of 1.2 million soldiers and civilians to Taiwan in 1948–1949, representing less than 15% of the population at the time (who constitute approximately 10% of the population in 2004). Consequently, the population growth rate after that was very rapid, especially in the late 1940s and 1950s, with an effective annual growth rate as high as 3.68% during 1951–1956.

Fertility rates decreased gradually thereafter; in 1984 the rate reached the replacement level (2.1 children per woman, which is needed to replace the existing population). Fertility rates have continued to decline. In 2010, Taiwan had a population growth of less than 0.2% and a fertility rate of only 0.9, the lowest rate ever recorded in that country. The population of Taiwan peaked at 23.6 million in 2019 and has been continuously decreasing ever since, raising fears of an aging population. Notably in 2025, the fertility rate hit 0.695, the lowest country-level rate globally.

Most Taiwanese speak Mandarin. Around 70% of the people also speak Hokkien and 10% speak Hakka. Japanese speakers are becoming rare as the elderly generation who lived under Japanese colonization are dying out. The Formosan languages are endangered as the indigenous peoples have become acculturated under Chinese culture.

== Population ==
According to February 2022 statistics from the Ministry of the Interior, the population of Taiwan was 23,319,776, 99.6% of whom live on the island of Taiwan. The remaining 0.4% live on offshore islands (Penghu, Lanyu, Green, Kinmen, and Matsu).

Taiwan is ranked the 58th most populous country in the world.

=== Historical ===
Estimates of the Chinese population on the island of Taiwan in 1624, prior to Dutch colonial rule, range from 1,500 to 2,000, or as high as 25,000 according to James W. Davidson. During Dutch Formosa rule, between 1624 and 1662, the Dutch began to encourage large-scale Han immigration to the island for labour, mainly from the south of Fujian.

It is estimated that prior to the Kingdom of Tungning (1661), the population of Taiwan was no greater than 100,000 people, and the initial Zheng army with families and retainers that settled in Taiwan is estimated to be 30,000 at minimum. During Qing rule (1683–1895), the population of Han Taiwanese in Taiwan grew rapidly from 100,000 to ≈2.5 million, while the indigenous population was estimated to be at least 200,000 by 1895. (The plains indigenous population is estimated to have decreased by 90% over the hundred years from 1800 to 1900.)

The Japanese Colonial Government performed detailed censuses every five years starting in 1905. Statistics showed a population growth rate of about 1% to 3% per year throughout Japanese rule. In 1905, the population of Taiwan was roughly 3 million; by 1940, the population had grown to 5.87 million, and after the Second World War in 1946 it numbered 6.09 million. The Japanese colonial authorities discriminated against mixed Japanese-Taiwanese couples with marriages only being recognized if the Taiwanese party officially joined a Japanese household. This also meant that the children of these couples, including married ones, were considered legally illegitimate.

View source data.

=== Population census ===
Historical Populations
Year	Pop.	±% p.a.
1905	3,123,302	—
1910	3,299,493	+1.10%
1920	3,757,838	+1.31%
1930	4,679,066	+2.22%
1940	6,077,478	+2.65%
1950	7,554,399	+2.20%
1960	10,792,202	+3.63%
1970	14,753,911	+3.18%
1980	17,866,008	+1.93%
1990	20,401,305	+1.34%
2000	22,276,672	+0.88%
2010	23,162,123	+0.39%
2020	23,561,236	+0.17%
2025	23,299,132	−0.22%
Source: https://www.census.gov/popclock/world/tw

Year	Males (thousands)	Females (thousands)	Total population (thousands)	Average annual growth rate (%)
1905	1,611	1,429	3,040	
1915	1,813	1,669	3,480	1.4
1920	1,894	1,762	3,655	1.0
1925	2,053	1,941	3,993	1.8
1930	2,459	2,239	4,593	2.8
1935	2,660	2,553	5,212	2.6
1940	2,971	2,901	5,872	2.4
1956	4,772	4,596	9,368	3.0
1966	7,153	6,352	13,505	3.7
1970 (sampling)	7,723	7,047	14,770	2.3
1975 (sampling)	8,439	7,840	16,279	2.0
1980	9,405	8,624	18,030	2.1
1990	10,618	9,775	20,394	1.2
2000	11,386	10,915	22,301	0.9
2010			23,052	0.4

=== Regional population ===
Residents per square kilometre by village

- Date:2019/07-08

County City	Area (km^{2})	Population	Margin	Density (people/km^{2})	Sort
New Taipei	2052.5667	4,010,657	+2843	1,954	1(8)
Taichung	2214.8968	2,811,729	+581	1,270	2(8)
Kaohsiung	2951.8524	2,773,786	+195	939	3(8)
Taipei	271.7997	2,650,154	−3854	9,765	4(8)
Taoyuan	1220.9540	2,240,328	+2385	1,833	5(8)
Tainan	2191.6531	1,881,730	−66	859	6(8)
Changhua County	1074.3960	1,273,613	−661	1,186	7(8)
Pingtung	2775.6003	820,798	−398	296	8(8)
Yunlin	1290.8326	682,577	−335	529	9(8)
Hsinchu County	1427.5369	561,766	+1047	393	10(8)
Miaoli	1820.3149	546,461	−37	300	11
Chiayi	1903.6367	504,750	−347	265	12(8)
Nantou	4106.4360	495,084	−22	121	13
Yilan	2143.6251	454,636	−57	212	14
Hsinchu City	104.1526	447,781	+297	4296	15(8)
Keelung	132.7589	369,305	−55	2782	16
Hualien	4628.5714	326,780	−33	69	17(8)
Chiayi City	60.0256	268,068	−163	4469	18
Taitung County	3515.2526	217,540	−296	62	19
Kinmen County	151.6560	139,319	−46	918	20
Penghu County	126.8641	104,711	+3	825	21
Lienchiang County	28.8000	13,073	+11	455	22(8)
Free area of the Republic of China	36,197.0669	23,593,794	+1196	651	−(8)

- Source: Ministry of Internal Affairs, Taiwan

=== Age structure ===
Year	0–14 years	15–64 years	65 years and over
1980	32.1%	63.6%	4.3%
1990	26.9%	67.0%	6.1%
2000	21.2%	70.2%	8.6%
2010	15.65%	73.61%	10.74%
2015	13.6%	73.9%	12.5%
2020	12.6%	71.4%	16.0%

=== Population growth and age structure ===
View source data.
View source data.

Demographic transition models (DTM) show how population pyramids change and go through specific stages. By looking at Taiwan's population pyramid, the country is in stage 4 of the DTM and its shape contracts but it will soon enter stage 5. In stage 5 of the DTM, death rate gradually exceeds fertility rate and a country starts to experience overall population loss. Access to good medical care increases the lifespan of a population. Knowledge of and access to contraception, along with an increase in women's participation in the workforce, cause a sharp decline in the fertility rate.

National statistics of Taiwan in 2018 indicate that there are approximately 140,000 more females than males. The birth rate (8.3 births/1,000 population) is slightly higher than the death rate (7.4 deaths/1,000 population). The total dependency ratio in Taiwan is 35.2%, which is relatively low. The low dependency ratio indicates that the dependent part of the population is less than half of the working part. Experts estimate the dependency ratio will rise to 92.9% by 2060. A rising dependency ratio and longer life expectancy will most likely require the government to support part of the elderly population as the working-age population is shrinking and thus less able to support the elderly directly.

=== Demographic transition and population aging ===
The process of population aging is primarily determined by fertility and mortality rate. The proportions of elderly people are different across countries. For example, developing countries with limited access to healthcare and contraceptives, where populations have a high fertility rate, tend to have a lower proportion of older people. Medical advancements, industrial developments, and better knowledge of sanitation, which started in the 18th century in many developed countries, have caused a decline in mortality rates and an increase in fertility rates, factors which raise the number of older people worldwide. According to the United Nations, many developed countries are in more advanced stages (4 or 5) of the demographic transition model and their number of elderly will remain high compared to less developed countries. This phenomenon is known as population aging.

According to the World Health Organization (WHO), since 1993, Taiwan has reached the threshold of an aging society. It was estimated the percentage of people over 65 was 8%. The CEPD estimated that the percentage of people 65 years or older will be over 20% in 2025, which means Taiwan will soon become a "super aged society". The critical factors that accelerate the speed of aging in Taiwan are high life expectancy and low fertility rate. The average life expectancy in 2014 was 80 years. The total fertility rate in 2014 was 1.1 (per 1,000 women) and dropped to 0.87 in 2022. In 2025, the fertility rate fell to 0.72, becoming the lowest of any country in the world.

According to a 2015 study by the Ministry of Health and Welfare, approximately 40% of Taiwan elders see themselves as a burden on family or society.

== Vital statistics ==
=== Births and deaths ===
Notable events in Taiwanese demography:

- 1942-1945 – Second World War
- 1949 – Republic of China retreat to Taiwan

	Average population	Live births	Deaths	Natural change	Crude birth rate (per 1000)	Crude death rate (per 1000)	Natural change (per 1000)	Crude migration change (per 1000)	Total Fertility Rate
1906	3,060,000	119,107	102,000	16,000	38.6	33.4	5.2		6.13
1907	3,090,000	121,756	100,000	21,000	39.1	32.4	6.7	3.1	6.16
1908	3,120,000	119,800	100,000	19,000	38.2	31.9	6.3	3.4	6.14
1909	3,160,000	127,286	98,000	29,000	40.2	31.1	9.1	3.7	6.29
1910	3,210,000	132,141	88,000	45,000	41.3	27.5	13.8	2.0	6.37
1911	3,270,000	135,658	86,000	51,000	41.8	26.2	15.6	3.1	6.42
1912	3,330,000	136,622	83,000	55,000	41.3	25.0	16.3	2.0	6.46
1913	3,390,000	136,967	85,000	53,000	40.8	25.0	15.8	2.2	6.45
1914	3,440,000	141,450	95,000	47,000	41.4	27.6	13.8	0.9	6.62
1915	3,480,000	137,669	110,000	29,000	40.0	31.5	8.5	3.1	6.45
1916	3,510,000	128,605	100,000	31,000	37.3	28.6	8.7	−0.1	
1917	3,560,000	142,414	96,000	50,000	40.9	27.0	13.9	0.3	
1918	3,590,000	139,465	122,000	21,000	39.7	34.1	2.8	5.6	
1919	3,630,000	136,707	97,000	43,000	38.5	26.8	11.7	−0.6	
1920	3,655,000	141,313	117,000	27,000	39.5	32.1	7.4	−0.5	6.48
1921	3,720,000	155,159	90,000	69,000	42.8	24.2	18.6	−0.8	
1922	3,790,000	154,531	93,000	65,000	41.8	24.6	17.2	1.6	
1923	3,860,000	146,984	82,000	69,000	39.1	21.3	17.8	0.7	
1924	3,930,000	158,688	96,000	67,000	41.4	24.5	16.9	1.2	
1925	3,993,000	159,423	95,000	68,000	40.8	23.9	16.9	−0.9	
1926	4,100,000	175,802	92,000	87,000	43.7	22.4	21.3	5.5	
1927	4,210,000	177,422	93,000	89,000	43.2	22.1	21.1	5.7	
1928	4,330,000	183,699	95,000	94,000	43.7	22.0	21.7	6.8	
1929	4,460,000	190,031	96,000	100,000	44.0	21.6	22.4	7.6	
1930	4,593,000	198,186	89,000	117,000	44.8	19.4	25.4	4.4	7.02
1931	4,710,000	208,137	100,000	116,000	45.8	21.3	24.5	1.0	
1932	4,867,000	204,913	99,000	115,000	44.0	20.4	23.6	9.7	
1933	4,995,000	211,737	98,000	123,000	44.3	19.7	24.6	1.7	
1934	5,128,000	219,189	105,166	123,510	44.6	20.5	24.1	2.5	
1935	5,255,000	225,980	106,905	129,040	44.9	20.3	24.6	0.2	
1936	5,384,000	223,961	106,332	127,725	43.5	19.8	23.7	0.8	
1937	5,530,000	237,090	109,096	138,570	44.8	19.7	25.1	2.0	
1938	5,678,000	235,821	111,723	133,117	43.1	19.7	23.4	3.4	
1939	5,821,000	244,707	115,044	139,119	43.7	19.8	23.9	1.3	
1940	5,987,000	246,691	116,239	141,232	43.0	19.4	23.6	4.9	6.11
1941	6,163,000	241,894	99,858	153,447	41.1	16.2	24.9	4.5	5.98
1942	6,339,000	242,796	112,161	143,243	40.3	17.7	22.6	6.0	5.93
1943	6,507,000	247,427	122,001	138,662	40.0	18.8	21.2	5.3	
1944									
1945									
1946									
1947	6,294,000	241,071	114,000	127,000	38.3	18.1	20.2		
1948	6,648,000	264,000	95,000	169,000	39.7	14.3	25.4	30.8	5.98
1949	7,099,000	300,843	93,000	208,000	42.4	13.1	29.3	38.5	6.49
1950	7,468,000	323,643	86,000	238,000	43.4	11.5	31.9	20.1	7.14
1951	7,695,000	385,383	89,000	296,000	50.0	11.6	38.5	−8.1	7.59
1952	8,000,000	372,905	79,000	294,000	46.6	9.9	36.8	2.8	7.56
1953	8,297,000	374,536	78,000	297,000	45.2	9.4	35.8	1.3	7.54
1954	8,617,000	383,574	71,000	313,000	44.6	8.2	36.3	2.3	7.25
1955	8,924,000	403,683	77,000	327,000	45.3	8.6	36.6	−1.0	7.32
1956	9,242,000	414,036	74,000	340,000	44.8	8.0	36.8	−1.2	7.27
1957	9,539,000	394,870	81,000	314,000	41.4	8.5	32.9	−0.8	6.83
1958	9,858,000	410,885	75,000	336,000	41.7	7.6	34.1	−0.7	6.48
1959	10,227,000	421,458	74,000	347,000	41.2	7.2	33.9	3.5	5.98
1960	10,602,000	419,442	74,000	345,000	39.5	7.0	32.5	4.2	5.75
1961	10,983,000	420,254	74,000	346,254	38.3	6.7	31.5	4.4	5.58
1962	11,312,000	423,469	72,000	351,469	37.4	6.4	31.1	−1.1	5.46
1963	11,680,000	424,250	71,000	353,250	36.3	6.1	30.2	2.3	5.35
1964	12,088,000	416,926	69,000	347,926	34.5	5.7	28.8	6.1	5.10
1965	12,442,000	406,604	67,887	338,717	32.7	5.5	27.2	2.1	4.82
1966	12,812,000	415,108	69,778	345,330	32.4	5.4	27.0	2.7	4.95
1967	13,147,000	374,282	71,861	302,421	28.5	5.5	23.0	3.1	4.22
1968	13,474,000	394,260	73,650	320,610	29.3	5.5	23.8	1.1	4.36
1969	13,995,000	390,728	70,549	320,179	27.9	5.0	22.9	15.8	4.14
1970	14,507,000	394,015	71,135	322,883	27.2	4.9	22.3	14.3	4.00
1971	14,837,000	380,424	70,954	309,470	25.6	4.8	20.9	1.8	3.70
1972	15,145,000	365,749	71,486	294,263	24.1	4.7	19.4	1.4	3.36
1973	15,424,000	366,942	73,477	293,465	23.8	4.8	19.0	−0.6	3.21
1974	15,699,000	355,933	74,760	293,063	23.4	4.8	18.7	−0.9	2.94
1975	15,999,000	357,653	75,061	292,586	23.0	4.7	18.3	0.8	2.76
1976	16,298,000	424,075	77,000	347,075	26.0	4.7	21.3	−2.6	3.08
1977	16,601,000	393,633	79,000	316,796	23.7	4.8	19.1	−0.5	2.64
1978	16,951,000	411,637	79,000	330,203	24.3	4.7	19.5	1.6	2.71
1979	17,337,000	421,720	82,000	340,518	24.3	4.7	19.6	3.2	2.67
1980	17,608,000	413,881	84,333	329,548	23.5	4.8	18.7	−3.1	2.51
1981	17,972,000	414,069	87,192	326,877	23.0	4.9	18.2	2.5	2.45
1982	18,261,000	405,263	87,578	317,685	22.2	4.8	17.4	−1.3	2.32
1983	18,538,000	383,439	90,951	292,488	20.7	4.9	15.8	−0.6	2.17
1984	18,873,000	371,008	89,915	281,093	19.7	4.8	14.9	3.2	2.05
1985	19,135,000	346,208	92,348	253,860	18.1	4.8	13.3	0.6	1.88
1986	19,356,000	309,230	95,057	214,173	16.0	4.9	11.1	0.4	1.68
1987	19,564,000	314,024	96,319	217,705	16.1	4.9	11.1	−0.4	1.70
1988	19,788,000	342,031	102,113	239,918	17.3	5.2	12.1	−0.7	1.86
1989	20,004,000	315,299	103,288	212,011	15.8	5.2	10.6	0.3	1.68
1990	20,230,000	335,618	105,669	229,949	16.6	5.2	11.4	−0.1	1.81
1991	20,455,000	321,932	106,284	215,648	15.7	5.2	10.5	0.6	1.72
1992	20,655,000	321,632	110,516	211,116	15.6	5.4	10.2	−0.4	1.73
1993	20,848,000	325,613	110,901	214,712	15.6	5.3	10.3	−1.0	1.76
1994	21,087,000	322,938	113,866	209,072	15.3	5.4	9.9	1.6	1.76
1995	21,268,000	329,581	119,112	210,469	15.5	5.6	9.9	−1.3	1.78
1996	21,441,000	325,545	122,489	203,056	15.2	5.7	9.5	−1.4	1.76
1997	21,634,000	326,002	121,000	205,002	15.1	5.6	9.5	−0.5	1.77
1998	21,836,000	271,450	123,180	148,270	12.4	5.6	6.8	2.5	1.47
1999	22,011,000	283,661	126,113	157,548	12.9	5.7	7.2	0.8	1.56
2000	22,185,000	305,312	125,957	179,355	13.8	5.7	8.1	−0.2	1.68
2001	22,342,000	260,354	127,647	132,707	11.7	5.7	5.9	1.2	1.40
2002	22,464,000	247,530	128,636	118,894	11.0	5.7	5.3	0.2	1.34
2003	22,554,000	227,070	130,801	96,269	10.1	5.8	4.3	−0.3	1.24
2004	22,647,000	216,419	135,092	81,327	9.6	6.0	3.6	0.5	1.18
2005	22,730,000	205,854	139,398	66,456	9.1	6.1	2.9	0.8	1.12
2006	22,824,000	204,459	135,839	68,620	9.0	6.0	3.0	1.1	1.12
2007	22,918,000	204,414	141,111	63 303	8.9	6.2	2.8	1.3	1.10
2008	22,998,000	198,733	143,624	55,109	8.6	6.2	2.4	1.1	1.05
2009	23,079,000	191,310	143,582	47,728	8.3	6.2	2.1	1.4	1.03
2010	23,141,000	166,886	145,772	21,114	7.2	6.3	0.9	1.8	0.90
2011	23,194,000	196,627	152,915	43,712	8.5	6.6	1.9	0.4	1.07
2012	23,271,000	229,481	154,251	75,230	9.9	6.6	3.2	0.1	1.27
2013	23,345,000	199,113	155,908	43,205	8.5	6.7	1.8	1.4	1.07
2014	23,434,000	210,383	163,929	46,454	9.0	7.0	2.0	1.8	1.17
2015	23,472,000	213,598	163,858	49,740	9.1	7.0	2.1	−0.5	1.18
2016	23,540,000	208,440	172,405	36,035	8.8	7.3	1.5	1.4	1.17
2017	23,571,000	193,844	171,242	22,602	8.2	7.3	0.9	0.4	1.13
2018	23,589,000	181,601	172,784	8,817	7.7	7.3	0.4	0.4	1.06
2019	23,603,000	177,767	176,296	1,471	7.5	7.5	0.0	0.6	1.05
2020	23,561,000	165,249	173,156	−7,907	7.0	7.4	−0.4	−1.4	0.99
2021	23,359,000	153,820	183,732	−29,912	6.6	7.9	−1.3	−7.3	0.98
2022	23,264,000	138,986	207,230	−68,244	6.0	8.9	−2.9	−1.2	0.87
2023	23,420,000	135,571	205,368	−69,797	5.8	8.8	−3.0	9.7	0.86
2024	23,400,000	134,856	202,107	−67,251	5.8	8.7	−2.9	2.1	0.89
2025	23,299,132	107,812	200,268	−92,456	4.6	8.6	−4.0	−0.4	0.70
2026	23,300,000(e)	92,000(e)	198,065(e)	−106,065	3.95	8.5	−4.55		0.598(e)

=== Current vital statistics ===
Period	Live births	Deaths	Natural increase
January—October 2025	90,839	168,047	–77,658
January—October 2026	77,481	166,203	–88,722
Difference	▼ –13,358 (-14.71%)	▼ –1,844 (-1.10%)	▼ –11,064

=== Total fertility rate ===
View source data.

In developed countries, trends like late marriage, no marriage, and having fewer children are growing. Developed countries tend to have lower fertility rates because access to birth control and contraceptives are easier and having children could become an economic burden caused by housing, education cost, and other costs for childcare. Most women in developed countries are in the workforce and tend to have higher educations and professional careers. As a result, many women tend to have children late in life or no children at all.

According to the BBC, the total fertility rate in Taiwan had decreased to 0.9 children per woman in 2010. This figure is much lower than the replacement level and one of the lowest in the world. This indicates the population is experiencing negative growth and population aging is happening fast. According to a Central News Agency Report, total births in 2017 were below 200,000. Compared to previous decades, the total number of births since 2000 has been between 197,000 and 230,000. If this trend continues, the senior population in Taiwan will be almost 5 times higher than the youth population by 2060.

==== Total fertility rate by region ====
2025
City/County	TFR
New Taipei	0.58
Keelung	0.47
Chiayi	0.66
Kinmen	0.52
Miaoli	0.71
Tainan	0.61
Chiayi County	0.60
Taichung	0.63
Nantou	0.71
Yilan County	0.68
Kaohsiung	0.71
Taiwan	0.70
Pingtung	0.75
Hualien	0.76
Hsinchu County	0.71
Hsinchu	0.80
Taoyuan	0.80
Taipei	0.80
Penghu	0.80
Changhua	0.85
Lienchiang	0.68
Taitung	0.94
Yunlin	1.14

The fertility rate in Taiwan is one of the lowest ever recorded in the world in historical times. It reached its lowest level in 2025: 0.695 children per female. In 1980, the rate was still well above replacement level (2.515), but it dropped to 1.88 in 1985, 1.81 in 1990, 1.78 in 1995, 1.68 in 2000, 1.12 in 2005, and 0.90 in 2010.

==== Before 1900 ====
Years	1875	1876	1877	1878	1879	1880	1881	1882	1883	1884
Total Fertility Rate	5.83	5.82	5.81	5.81	5.8	5.79	5.78	5.78	5.77	5.76

Years	1885	1886	1887	1888	1889	1890	1891	1892	1893	1894
Total Fertility Rate	5.75	5.75	5.74	5.73	5.72	5.72	5.71	5.7	5.69	5.69

Years	1895	1896	1897	1898	1899
Total Fertility Rate	5.68	5.67	5.66	5.66	5.65

=== Life expectancy at birth ===
Historical development of life expectancy in Taiwan

In 2022, Taiwan is ranked 42nd in the world for highest life expectancy at birth.

Gender	Life expectancy in 2022
Male	76.63 years
Female	83.28 years
Total	79.8 years

=== Infant mortality rate ===
total: 6.29 deaths/1,000 live births
male: 6.97 deaths/1,000 live births
female: 5.55 deaths/1,000 live births (2006 est.)

== Ethnicity ==
The ROC government reports that 95 to 97 percent of Taiwan's population is as "other populations" (of Han Chinese ethnicity, which includes Hoklo, Hakka, and other ethnic groups originating from mainland China). Over 2% of the population consists of indigenous people. 21,000 Westerners live in Taiwan, accounting for 0.1% of its total population.

=== Indigenous people ===
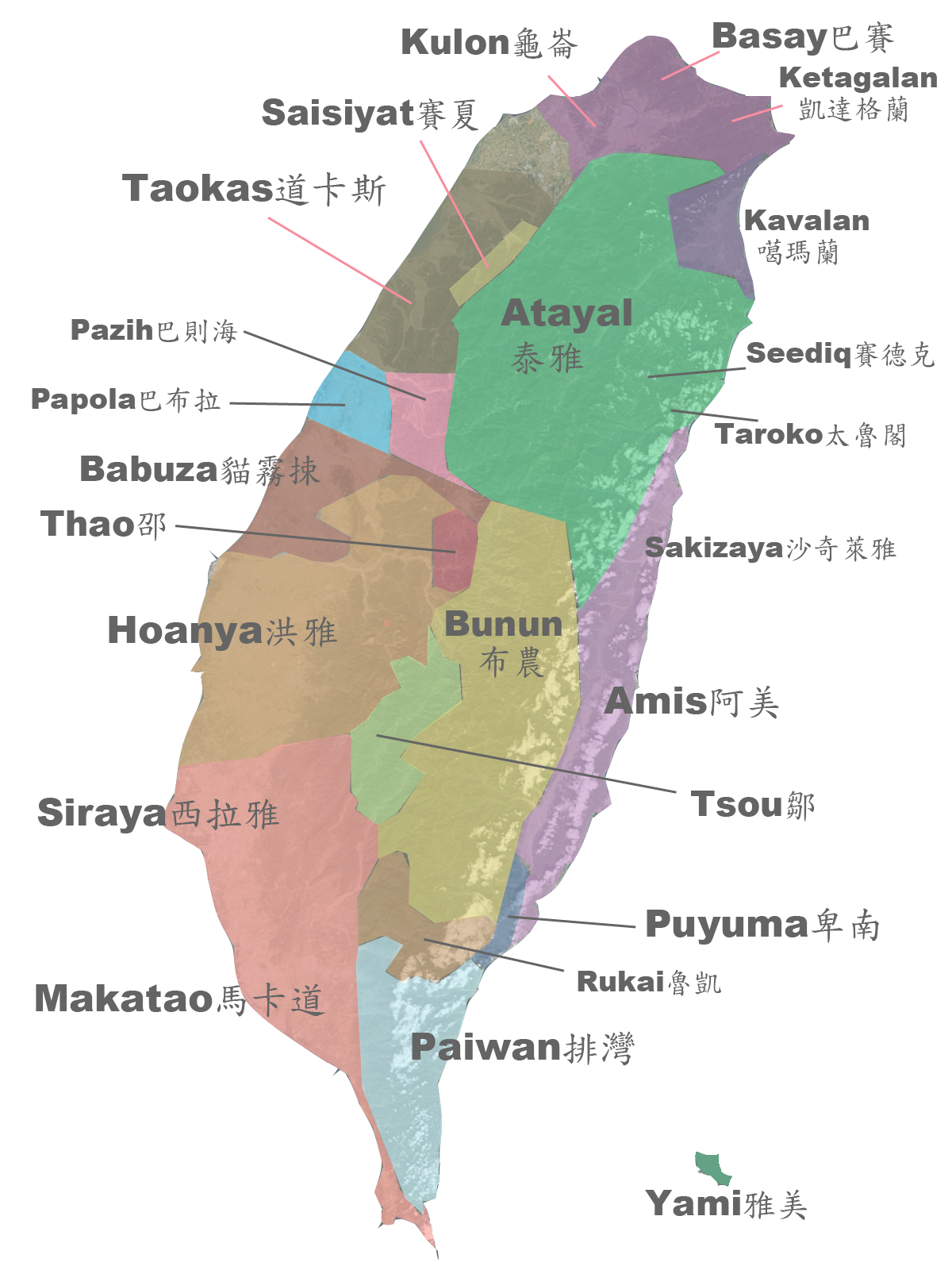
Original geographic distributions of Taiwanese aboriginal peoples

The total population of recognized indigenous people in Taiwan is approximately 569,000, or approximately 2.38% of Taiwan's population. These groups primarily inhabit the eastern half of Taiwan, which consists mostly of mountainous terrain. Their population growth rate (1.2%) and population pyramid are considerably more youthful than the overall population. Including migrant workers, the Austronesian population of Taiwan is approaching 1 million.

Place	Population			Pct
Place	Male	Female	Total	Pct
Living in the Eastern plains	111,372	109,141	220,513	47.1%
Living in the mountains	122,016	126,073	248,089	52.9%
Total	233,388	235,214	468,602	100%

Note: Source data obtained from the Ministry of the Interior website (Spreadsheet data: m1-04.xls)

The Taiwanese government officially recognizes sixteen ethnic groups of Taiwanese indigenous peoples (Chinese: 原住民; pinyin: yuánzhùmín; Pe̍h-ōe-jī: Gôan-chū-bîn). In the early 1910s, research in the Japanese era recognized nine ethnic groups: Amis, Atayal, Bunun, Paiwan, Puyuma, Rukai, Saisiyat, Tsou, and Yami. After the 2000s, indigenous cultural revitalization movements forced the government to change its attitude towards the indigenous people of Taiwan. The Yami people were renamed to Tao. New ethnic groups were also recognized by the government, including Thao in 2001, Kavalan in 2002, Truku (Taroko) in 2004, Sakizaya in 2007, Seediq in 2008, Kanakanavu in 2014, and Saaroa in 2014. There are at least another dozen groups that are not officially recognized by the government.

Officially Recognized Taiwanese Indigenous Peoples
Name	Formosan native name	Chinese	Population at census 2000	Population (02/2016)	Notes
Amis	Pangcah, 'Amis	阿美族	148,992	203,740	Recognized since Japanese era. The name Amis means "north"
Atayal	Tayal, Tayan	泰雅族	91,883	87,156	Recognized since Japanese era. The name Atayal means "brave person"
Bunun	Bunun	布農族	41,038	56,844	Recognized since Japanese era.
Kanakanavu	Kanakanavu	卡那卡那富族	—	267	Classified as Tsou, recognized since 2014
Kavalan	Kebalan, Kbaran	噶瑪蘭族	—	1,416	Some Kavalan were classified as Amis, recognized since 2002
Paiwan	Payuan	排灣族	70,331	97,788	Recognized since Japanese era.
Puyuma	Pinuyumayan	卑南族	9,606	13,651	Recognized since Japanese era.
Rukai	Drekay	魯凱族	12,084	12,996	Recognized since Japanese era.
Saaroa	Hla'alua	拉阿魯哇族	—	294	Classified as Tsou, recognized since 2014
Saisiyat	Say-Siyat	賽夏族	5,311	6,495	Recognized since Japanese era.
Sakizaya	Sakizaya	撒奇萊雅族	—	863	Classified as Amis, recognized since 2007
Seediq	Seediq	賽德克族	—	9,451	Classified as Atayal, recognized since 2008
Taroko	Truku	太魯閣族	—	30,382	Classified as Atayal, recognized since 2004
Thao	Thao, Ngan	邵族	—	768	Classified as Tsou, recognized since 2001
Tsou	Cou	鄒族	6,169	6,647	Recognized since Japanese era.
Yami	Tao	達悟族、雅美族	3,872	4,494	Recognized since Japanese era. The name Yami means "person"
Unspecified	尚未申報		8,249	14,206	
Total			397,535	547,465	

Unrecognized indigenous groups may include extinct tribes (mostly Plains indigenous peoples) or communities currently classified with other groups. There are also 25,943 indigenous people who are currently not classified in any group.

Unrecognized Taiwanese indigenous Peoples
Name	Formosan native name	Chinese	Notes
Arikun	Arikun	阿立昆族	Sometimes classified as Hoanya
Babuza	Babuza, Poavasa	貓霧拺族	
Basay	Basay, Basai	巴賽族、馬塞族	Sometimes classified as Ketagalan
Hoanya	Hoanya	洪雅族、和安雅族	Sometimes split into Lloa and Arikun
Kaxabu	Kaxabu, Kahapu	噶哈巫族	Sometimes classified as Pazeh. In revitalization.
Ketagalan	Ketagalan	凱達格蘭族	
Kulon	Kulon	龜崙族	
Lloa	Lloa	羅亞族	Sometimes classified Hoanya
Luilang	Luilang	雷朗族	Sometimes classified as Ketagalan
Makatao	Makatao, Tao	馬卡道族	Sometimes classified as Siraya. Recognized in Pingtung. In revitalization.
Papora	Papora, Vupuran	拍瀑拉族、巴布拉族	
Pazeh	Pazéh, Pazih	巴宰族、巴則海族	In revitalization.
Qauqaut	Qauqaut	猴猴族	
Siraya	Siraya	西拉雅族、希萊耶族	Recognized in Tainan and Fuli. In revitalization.
Taivoan	Taivoan, Taivuan	大武壠族	Sometimes classified as Siraya. Recognized in Fuli. In revitalization.
Taokas	Taokas	道卡斯族	In revitalization.

=== Others ===
The majority of Han Taiwanese descend from immigrants who arrived to the island prior to Japanese rule (1895–1945) and can be classified as the Hoklo and Hakka, on the basis of language and customs. As the majority of early immigrants were Hokkien speakers from Fujian who arrived starting in the 17th century, the Hoklos account for about 70% of the total population today. During Qing rule, a large number of Hoklo men took indigenous brides. Some of the plains indigenous also adopted Chinese customs and language so as to be indistinguishable from the Han. Thus, many who categorize themselves as Han have some degree of indigenous ancestry.

A significant minority of Han Taiwanese are Hakka, and they constitute about 15% of the total population. The Hakkas emigrated chiefly from eastern Guangdong, speak Hakka Chinese, and originally took up residence in the hills of the indigenous border districts.

Waishengren form another significant mixed ethnic group in Taiwan. The term refers to migrants who moved from China to Taiwan between 1945, when the ROC took control of Taiwan from the Japanese empire, and 1949 during the relocation of the ROC from mainland China to Taiwan. Estimates vary regarding how many waishengren migrated, with most estimates ranging between 950,000 and 2 million, with 1.2 million being the most commonly cited figure in Taiwan, which would have constituted less than 15% of the population at the time (who constitute approximately 10% of the population in 2004).

== Foreign residents ==
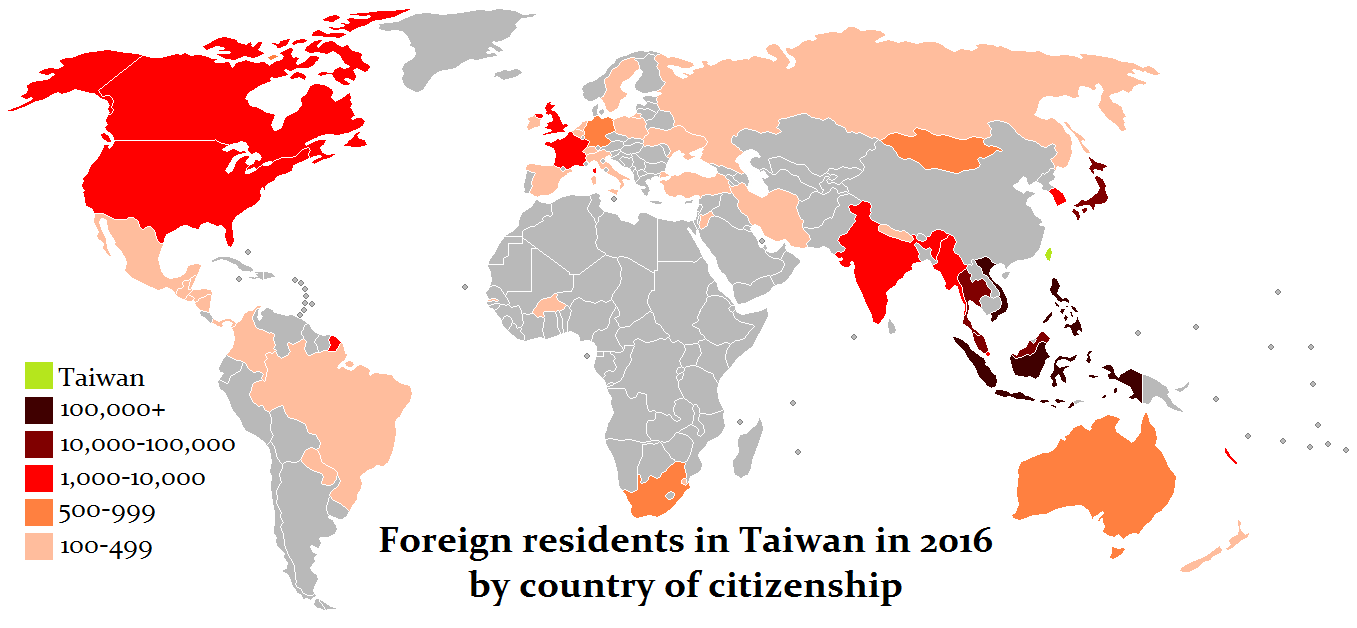
Number of foreign residents in Taiwan by nationality as of 2016

There are 812,603 foreign residents in Taiwan as of April 2023, representing 3.48% of the country's population.

Nationality	2025 (Dec.)	2024 (Dec.)	2023 (Dec.)	2022 (Sep.)	2021 (Sep.)	2019	% in 2023
Indonesia	352,095	317,559	278,991	234,329	254,403	255,770	33.15%
Vietnam	311,681	289,232	255,627	234,100	247,817	224,108	30.37%
Philippines	194,516	166,916	151,198	154,075	156,996	152,179	17.96%
Thailand	82,870	83,037	77,114	72,061	67,308	64,381	9.16%
Malaysia	19,522	24,118	24,323	23,749	22,819	20,549	2.89%
Japan	14,262	13,494	14,136	15,956	16,160	13,768	1.68%
United States	10,579	10,173	11,288	11,462	12,847	9,979	
India	6,202	5,924	5,320	4,671	4,695	3,748	0.63%
South Korea	4,827	4,776	4,820	4,843	5,132	4,481	0.57%
Myanmar	7,858	5,743	4,217	2,611	1,852	1,671	0.50%
United Kingdom	2,836	2,615	2,559	2,989	2,961	2,097	0.30%
Canada	2,453	2,528	2,528	2,579	2,737	2,167	0.30%
Singapore	1,836		1,863	1,766	1,726	1,456	0.22%
Cambodia	1,232		543	359		164	0.06%
Brazil	316		292	259	261	307	0.03%
Laos	66		60	54		41	
Croatia	34		31	39		31	
Brunei	14		15	14		21	
Uruguay	14		10	12		13	
Total	1,032,982	948,066	841,627	783,662		772,281	100.0%
Source: National Immigration Agency, Ministry of the Interior

== Languages ==
During Japanese rule (between 1895 and 1945), Japanese was the medium of instruction and could be fluently spoken by many of those educated during that period. Almost everyone in Taiwan born after the early 1950s can speak Mandarin, which was the official language and has been the medium of instruction in schools ever since.

Hanyu Pinyin, the official romanization system in mainland China, has also been the standard of Taiwan since 2009. A number of romanization systems are still seen in Taiwan, including Tongyong, the official romanization in Taiwan between 2002 and 2008, Wade–Giles, often found on passports, and Postal.

Other Sinitic languages can also be seen in Taiwan. The majority speak Taiwanese Hokkien, a branch of Southern Min, which had formerly been the most commonly spoken language. On Matsu Islands, the Eastern Min Fuzhou dialect is prevalent. Although people on Kinmen (Quemoy) also speak Southern Min, it is not the case in the Wuqiu Islands, for they speak a dialect of the Pu-Xian Min. The ethnic Hakka speak various Taiwanese Hakka dialects including Sixian, Hailu, Dabu, Raoping, and Zhao'an.

The most widely spoken Formosan languages today are Amis, Atayal, Bunun, and Paiwan. The other indigenous languages that have gained official recognition are Kanakanavu, Kavalan, Puyuma, Rukai, Hla’alua, Saisiyat, Sakizaya, Seediq (closely related to Truku), Thao, Tsou, and Yami (also known as Tao).

Languages used at home for the resident nationals aged 6 years and over (2010, per 100 resident nationals) (Note: One may use more than one language at home. This table refers to the relative frequency of languages used at home to the total of resident nationals.)
Division	Population	Mandarin	Hokkien	Hakka	Indigenous	Others
Total	21,407,235	83.5	81.9	6.6	1.4	2
New Taipei City	3,779,575	92	82.9	2.4	0.9	2.4
Taipei	2,475,422	93.2	73.5	3.5	0.5	3.2
Keelung	358,927	87.2	91.1	0.9	1.8	1.8
Hsinchu	427,792	92	70.7	11.1	0.8	1.6
Yilan	393,109	78.2	94.9	0.6	1.8	1
Taoyuan	1,982,734	93.4	58.2	17.1	1.3	1.3
Hsinchu County	464,165	90.6	27.7	56	2	1.1
Taichung	2,521,926	87.1	89.9	3.5	0.6	1.4
Miaoli	482,329	79.4	45.8	52.4	1	0.5
Changhua	1,123,439	69.5	98.1	0.3	0.2	0.9
Nantou	426,631	75.3	92	3.2	4.3	1.2
Yunlin	573,064	60	98.2	1.6	0.1	1.4
Tainan	1,719,853	71.7	95.8	0.5	0.3	2.7
Kaohsiung	2,596,510	78.6	90.9	3	0.7	2.4
Chiayi	250,900	76.5	94.7	0.4	0.3	1
Chiayi County	458,244	61	97.5	0.8	0.8	3.6
Pingtung	750,122	66.2	82.3	12	4.7	0.5
Penghu	80,203	75	93.6	0.5	0.3	2.4
Taitung	187,763	89.9	65.9	5.4	21.3	5.5
Hualien	287,858	90.8	60.9	10.8	16.9	1.6
Kinmen	52,603	85.4	92.8	1.1	0.5	0.8
Lienchiang	14,066	96.6	44.7	3.9	1.6	24.1

== Religion ==
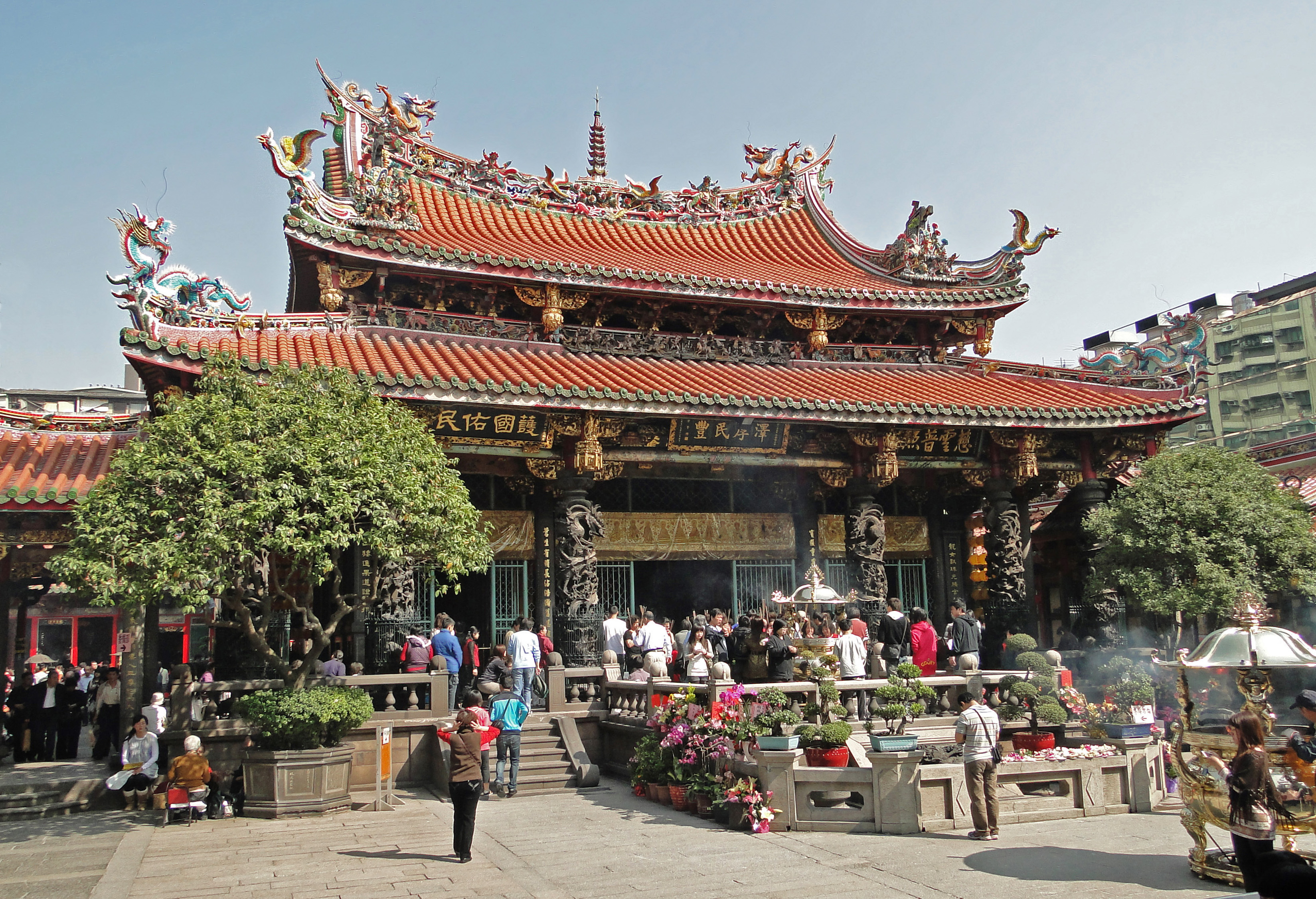
Lungshan Temple of Manka, Taipei

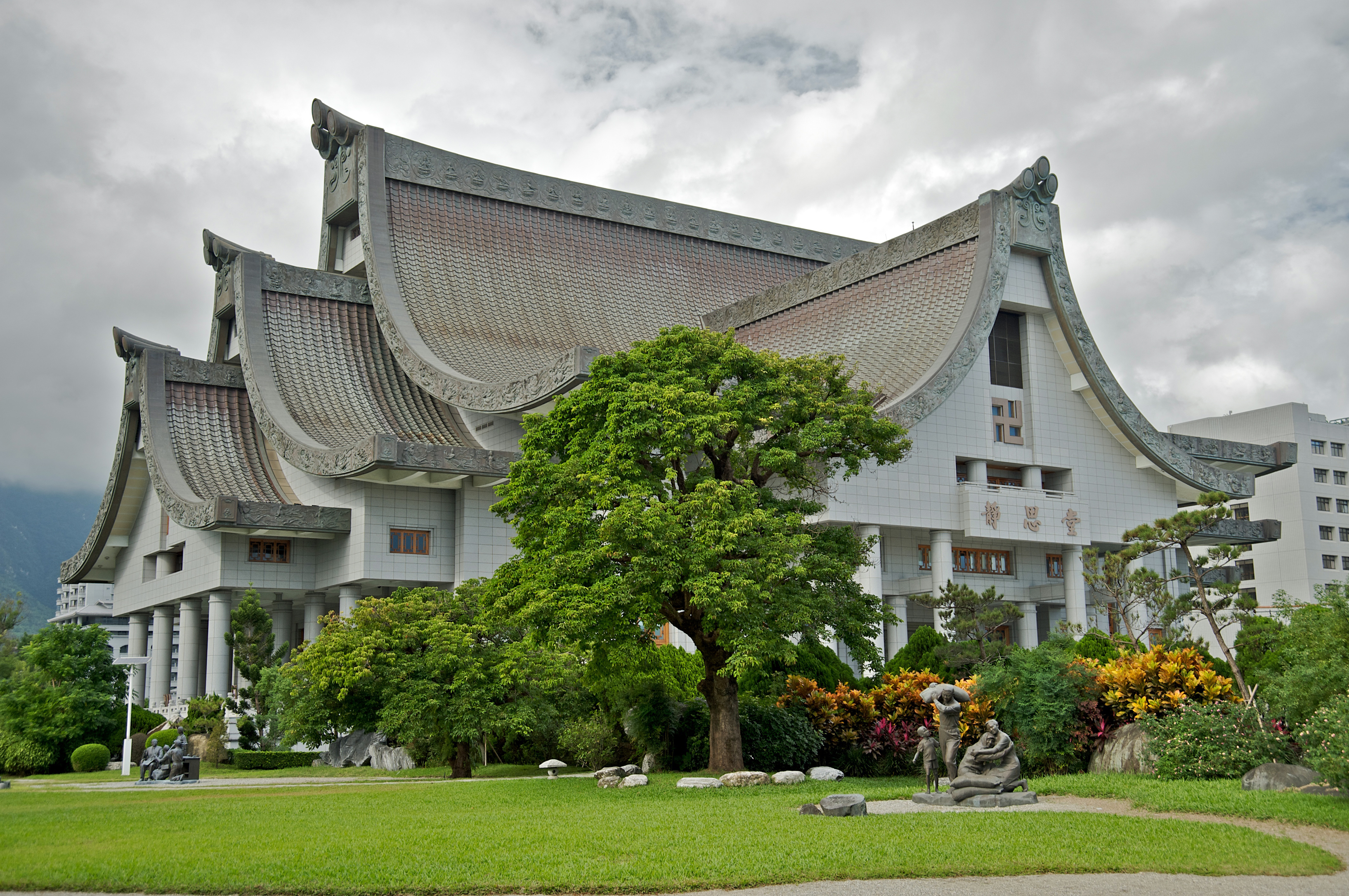
Still Thoughts Hall, Hualien City

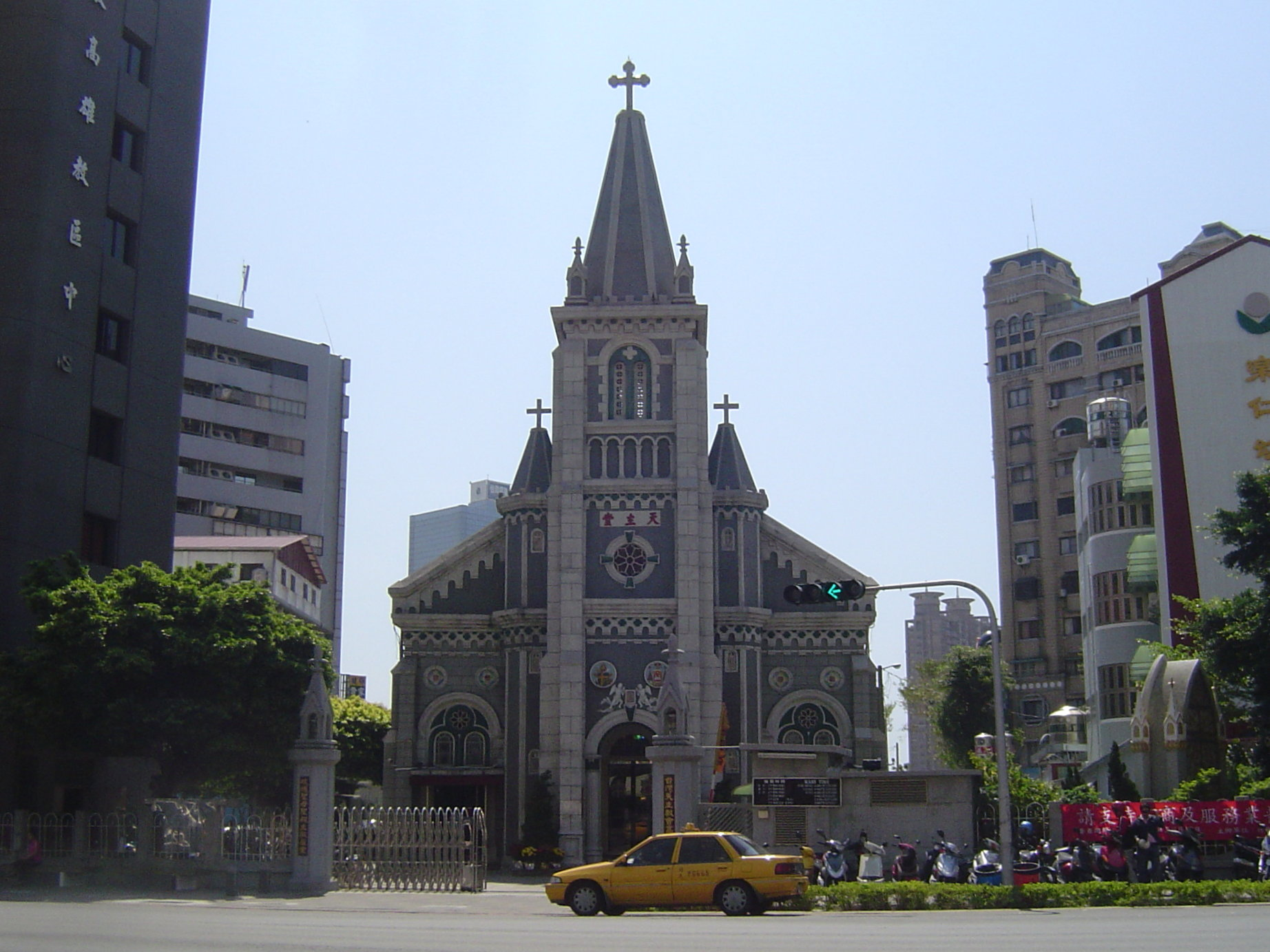
Holy Rosary Cathedral, Kaohsiung

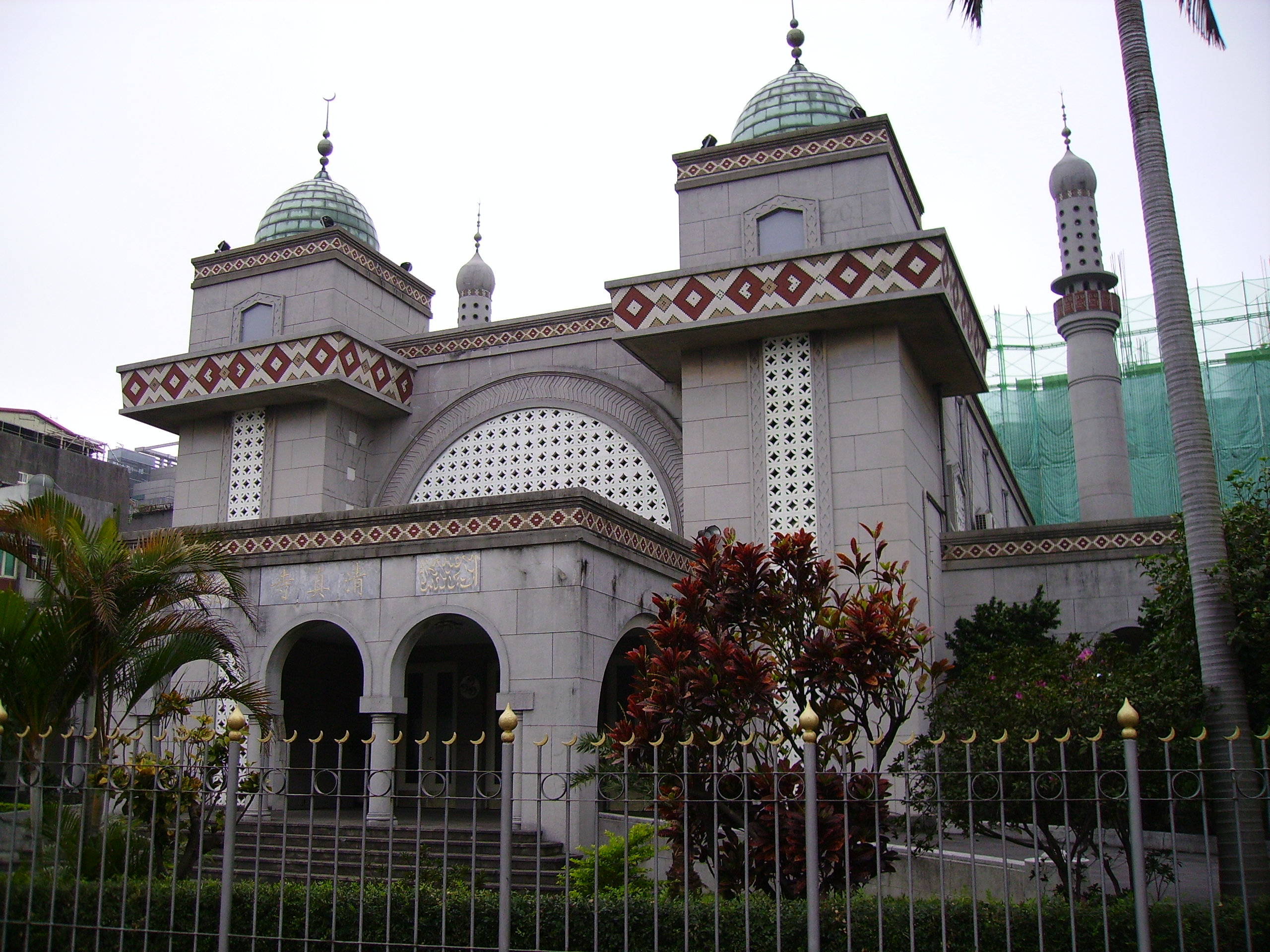
Taipei Grand Mosque, Taipei

Article 13 of the Constitution of the Republic of China guarantees freedom of religion as a right of all its citizens. As of 2013, the Republic of China government recognizes 27 religions which are registered with the Civil Affairs Department of the Ministry of the Interior (MOI).

=== Statistics on registered religions (2005) ===
About 81.3% of the population can be considered religious believers, most of whom identify as Buddhists (35%) or Taoists (33%). Chinese folk religion is generally practised under the aegis of Taoism, while more than 10% of the population adheres to popular movements of salvation. Confucianism also is an honored school of thought and ethical codes. Christian churches have been active in Taiwan for centuries; a majority of them are Protestant, with Presbyterians playing a particularly significant role. The Republic of China's government has diplomatic relations with the Holy See, which is the only European nation to formally recognize the Republic of China and is its longest-lasting diplomatic ally, having established relations in 1942. Islam has seen a surge in recent years as a result of foreign Muslims seeking work in Taiwan, most notably from Indonesia. There is also a small group of Shinto followers under the Tenriist sect, which was introduced in the 1970s.

The table below shows official statistics on religion issued by the Department of Civil Affairs, Ministry of the Interior ("MOI"), in 2005. The Taiwanese government recognises 26 religions in Taiwan. The statistics are reported by the various religious organisations to the MOI:

Religion	Members	% of total population	Temples & churches
Buddhism (佛教) (including Tantric Buddhism)	8,086,000	35.1%	4,006
Taoism (道教)	7,600,000	33.0%	18,274
Yiguandao (一貫道)	810,000	3.5%	3,260
Protestantism (基督新教)	605,000	2.6%	3,609
Roman Catholic Church (羅馬天主教)	298,000	1.3%	1,151
Lord of Universe Church—Tiandiism (天帝教)	298,000	1.3%	50
Miledadao (彌勒大道)	250,000	1.1%	2,200
Holy Church of the Heavenly Virtue—Tiandiism (天德教)	200,000	0.9%	14
Zailiism/Liism (理教)	186,000	0.8%	138
Xuanyuanism (軒轅教)	152,700	0.7%	22
Islam (伊斯蘭教)	58,000	0.3%	7
Mormonism (耶穌基督後期聖徒教會)	51,090	0.2%	54
Tenriism (天理教)	35,000	0.2%	153
Church of Maitreya the King of the Universe (宇宙彌勒皇教)	35,000	0.2%	12
Haizidao (亥子道)	30,000	0.1%	55
Church of Scientology (山達基教會)	20,000	< 0.1%	7
Bahá'í Faith (巴哈伊教)	16,000	< 0.1%	13
Jehovah's Witnesses (耶和華見證人)	9,256	< 0.1%	85
True School of the Mysterious Gate (玄門真宗)	5,000	< 0.1%	5
Holy Church of the Middle Flower (中華聖教)	3,200	< 0.1%	7
Mahikari (真光教團)	1,000	< 0.1%	9
Precosmic Salvationism (先天救教)	1,000	< 0.1%	6
Yellow Middle (黃中)	1,000	< 0.1%	1
Dayiism (大易教)	1,000	< 0.1%	1
Total religious population	18,724,823	81.3%	33,223
Total population	23,036,087	100%	

The figures for The Church of Jesus Christ of Latter-day Saints are not from the MOI, rather they are based on self-reported data from LDS Newsroom. The figures for Jehovah's Witnesses are not from the MOI either, they are based on the Witnesses' own 2007 Service Year Report. In the original report, both of them were counted as part of Protestantism.

== Military personnel ==
The Republic of China has a compulsory military draft for males aged 19–35 years of age with a service obligation of 4 months (2018). This was extended(returned) to one year for those born post 2005.

=== Population available for draft ===
Defined as 19–49 years of age.

Gender	Population
Male	5,883,828
Female	5,680,773
Total	11,564,601

=== Fit for military service ===
Of the available population, the following are fit for military service. Defined as 19–49 years of age.

Gender	Population
Male	4,749,537
Female	4,644,607
Total	9,394,144

== See also ==
- Demographics of Japan
- East Asia
- Democratic Progressive Party
- Sex-selective abortion in Taiwan

== Bibliography ==
- Andrade, Tonio (2008a), "Chapter 1: Taiwan on the Eve of Colonization", How Taiwan Became Chinese: Dutch, Spanish, and Han Colonization in the Seventeenth Century, Columbia University Press
- Andrade, Tonio (2008f), "Chapter 6: The Birth of Co-colonization", How Taiwan Became Chinese: Dutch, Spanish, and Han Colonization in the Seventeenth Century, Columbia University Press
- Brown, Melissa J. (2004). Is Taiwan Chinese? : The Impact of Culture, Power and Migration on Changing Identities. Berkeley: University of California Press. ISBN 0-520-23182-1.
- Davidson, James W. (1903). The Island of Formosa, Past and Present : history, people, resources, and commercial prospects : tea, camphor, sugar, gold, coal, sulphur, economical plants, and other productions. London and New York: Macmillan. OCLC 1887893. OL 6931635M.
- The Republic of China Yearbook 2014 (PDF). Executive Yuan, R.O.C. 2014. ISBN 9789860423020.
- Rubinstein, Murray A. (1999). Taiwan: A New History. Armonk, NY [u.a.]: Sharpe. ISBN 978-1-56324-815-3.
