= Arecuna =

Arecuna may refer to:

- Arecuna or Pemon, an ethnic group of South America
- Arecuna language or Pemon language, a Cariban language

== See also ==
- Arikun people, an ethnic group of Taiwan
