= Plains Indigenous peoples =

Indigenous people of Taiwan

Plains Indigenous peoples, also known as Pingpu people (Chinese: 平埔族群; pinyin: Píngpu zúqún; Pe̍h-ōe-jī: Pêⁿ-po͘-cho̍k-kûn) and previously as plain aborigines, are Taiwanese Indigenous peoples originally residing in lowland regions, as opposed to Highland Indigenous peoples. Plains Indigenous peoples consist of anywhere from eight to twelve individual groups, or tribes, rather than being a single ethnic group. They are part of the Austronesian family. Beginning in the 17th century, Plains Indigenous peoples have been heavily influenced by external forces from Dutch, Spanish, and Han Chinese colonization of Taiwan.

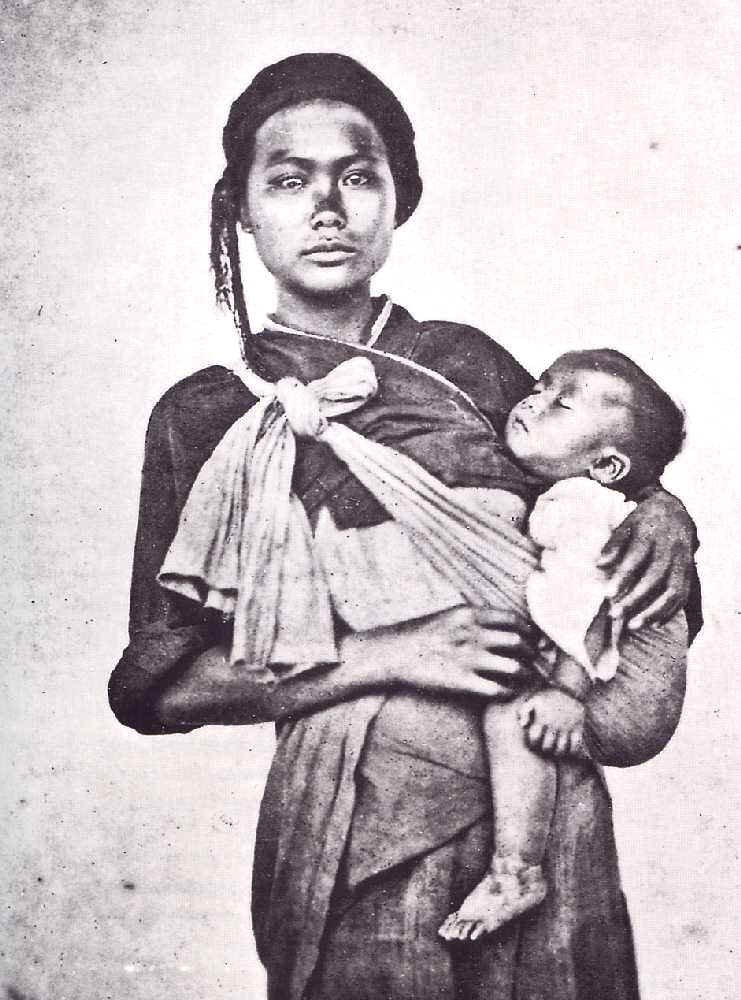
Taiwanese Plains Indigenous woman and infant, by John Thomson, 1871.

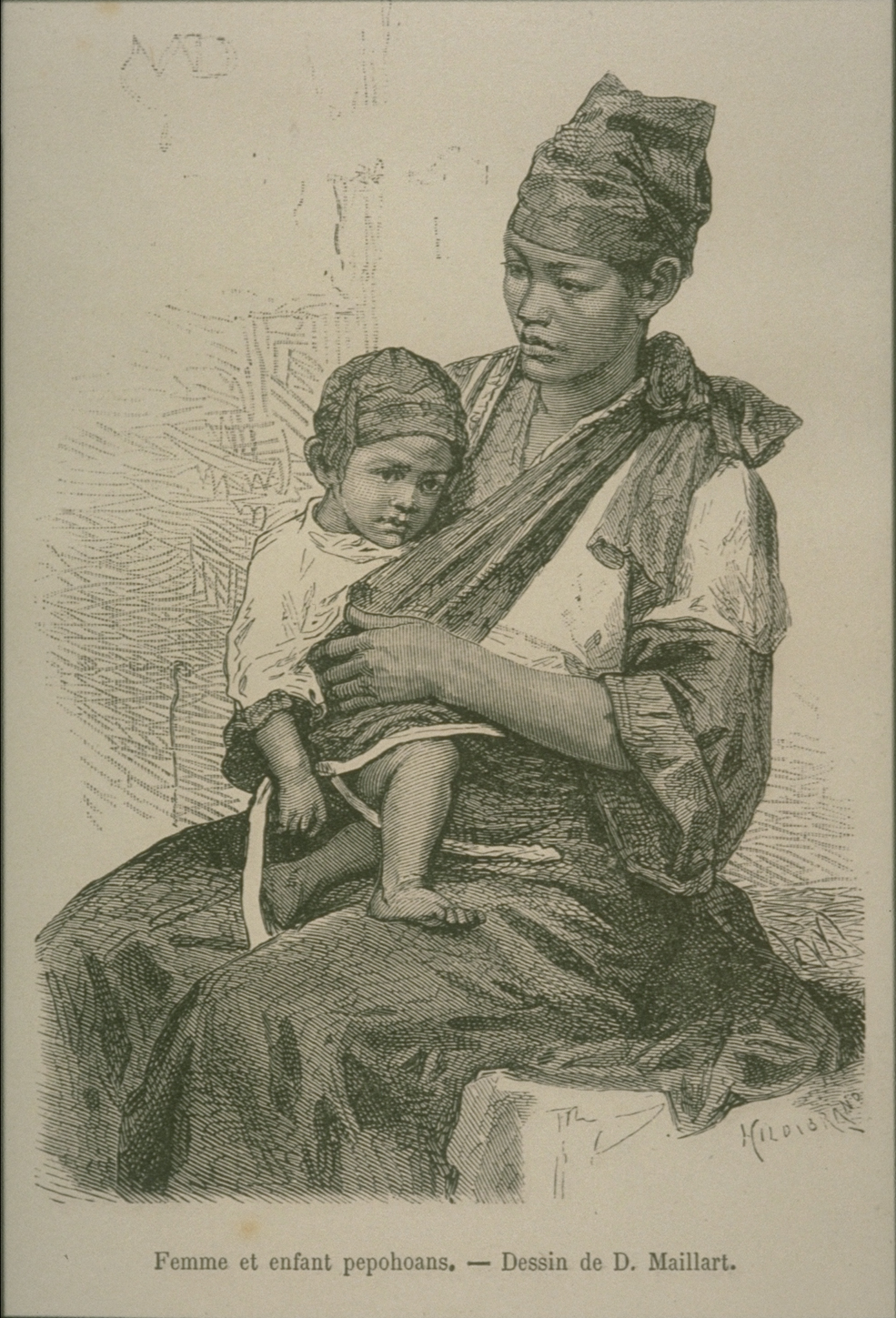
Taiwanese Plains Indigenous mother and child c. 1875

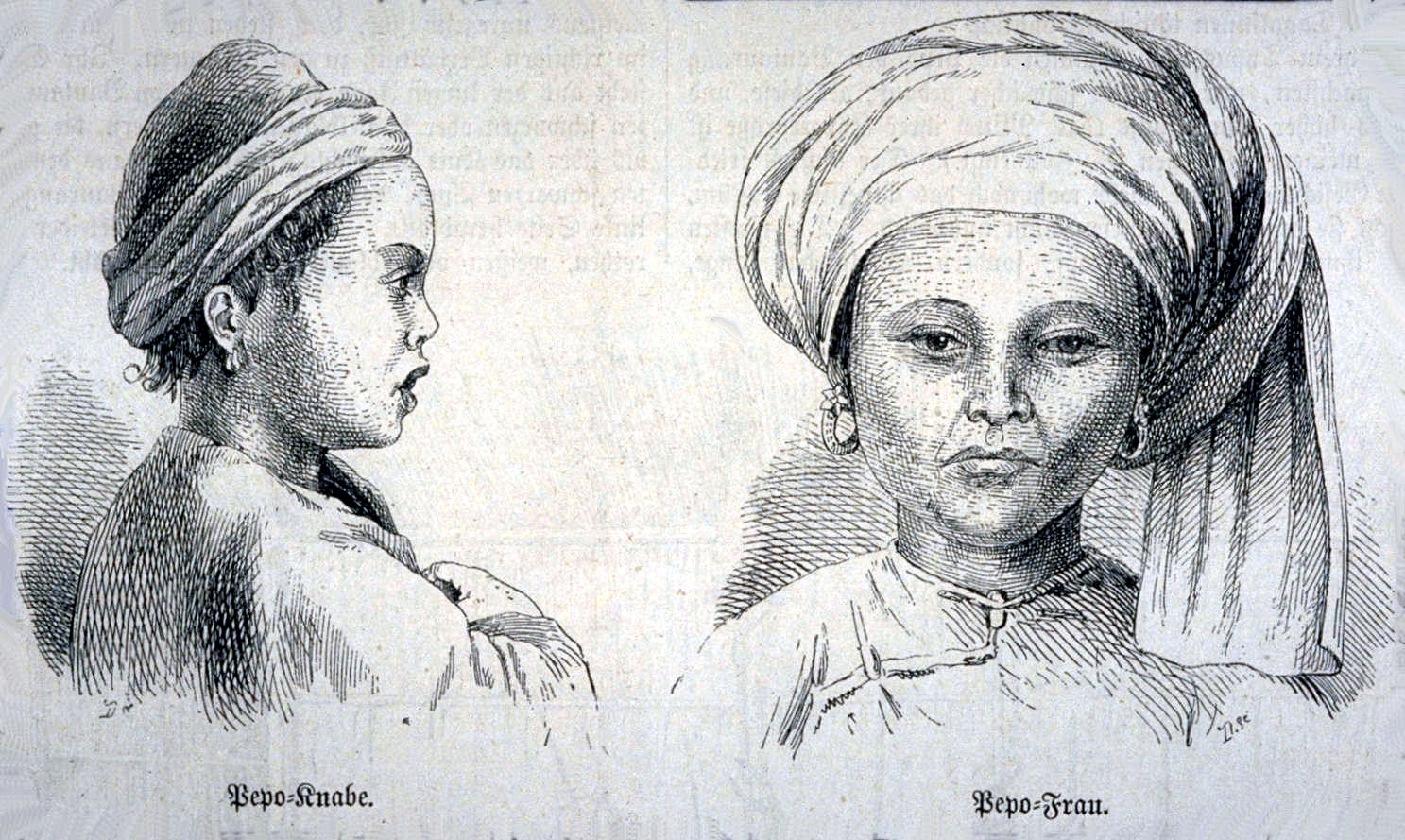
1877 sketch of a Plains Indigenous person

Plains Indigenous peoples are recognized by the Taiwan government as "Pingpu Indigenous People"; however, only the Kavalan sub-group has been given full rights and privileges. It was not until the mid-1980s that Plains Indigenous peoples started gaining interest from historians and anthropologists, leading to increased public attention to this group. These Indigenous groups are currently continuing to fight for their identity, rights, and recognition as Taiwanese Indigenous peoples. In 2016, the Tsai Ing-wen administration promised to grant official recognition to the Plains Indigenous peoples, and a draft bill is being reviewed by the Legislative Yuan as of June 2018.

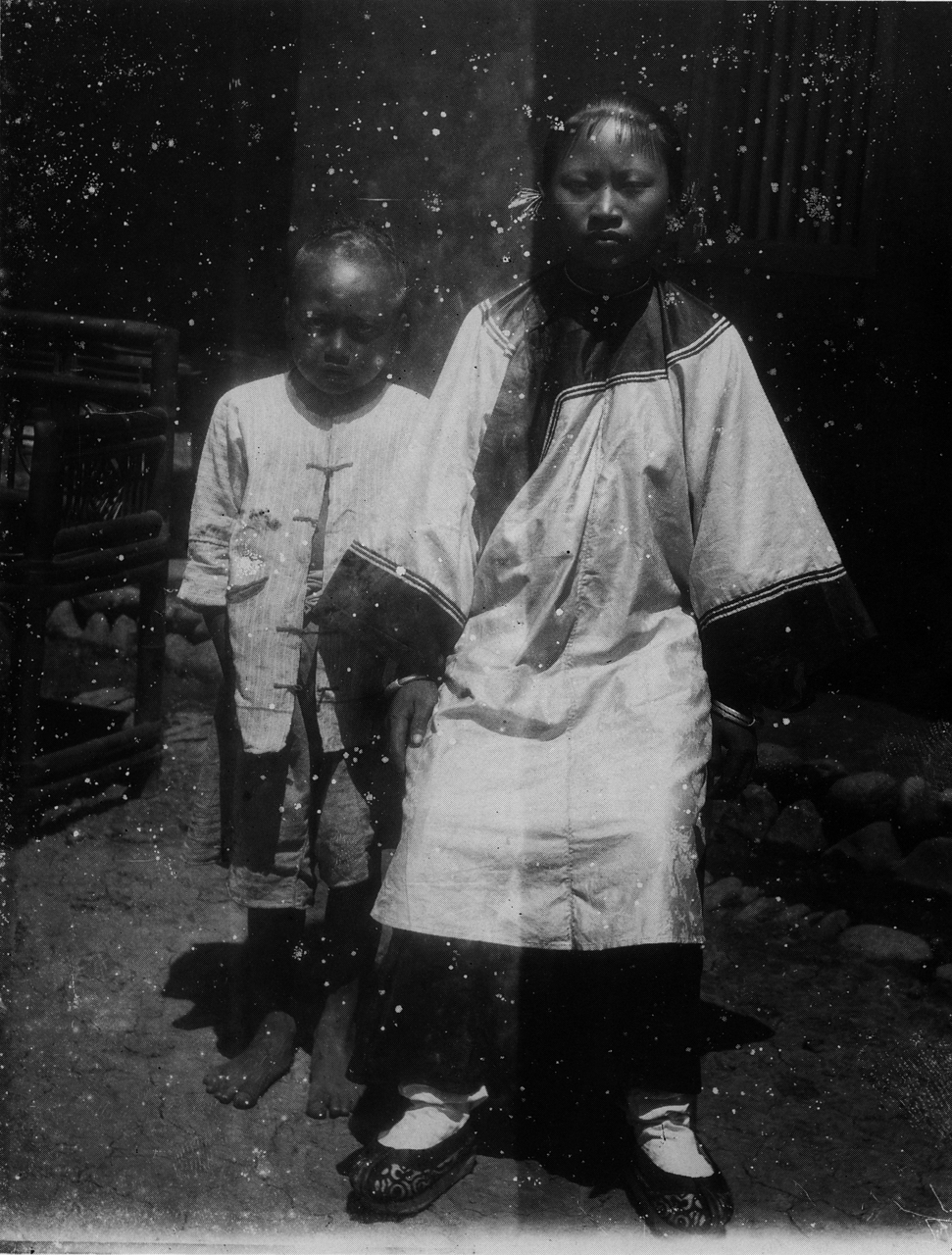
Plains Indigenous siblings in Puli, Nantou

As of 2012, there were 80,000 people identified as Plains Indigenous people in Taiwan and an estimated 200,000 people are descendants of the Plains Indigenous Peoples.

== Background ==
In the book titled The Island of Formosa (1903), former United States Consul to Formosa James W. Davidson presented the first English-language account of the Indigenous peoples of the whole island, which was almost entirely based on the comprehensive work collected over several years of study by Japanese anthropologist Ino Kanori, the foremost authority on the topic at the time. In Ino's eight-group classification, the Pepo, Puyuma, and Amis groups were known as "domesticated savages" (Japanese: 熟番, Hepburn: jukuban), primarily due to their abandonment of ancient customs. Of these three groups, only the Pepo lived in the western plains, where they remained to compete with the Chinese settlers (the Puyuma and Amis inhabited the eastern plains).

The term Pepo (Chinese: 平埔; pinyin: píngpǔ; Pe̍h-ōe-jī: pêⁿ-po͘; lit. 'flat plain') referred to Indigenous peoples that resided in the Formosan plains, rather than the highland mountainous regions. Plains Indigenous peoples mainly settled in the west and central mountain regions of Taiwan. The term Sek-hoan (熟番; shúfān; se̍k-hoan; 'well-cooked/familiar savages') was also used to describe Plains Indigenous peoples because they often lived closer to the coast and had more interaction with Dutch and Han Chinese colonizers, hence were more assimilated and "civilised" than highland Indigenous peoples. Mention of Plains Indigenous peoples have appeared in Qing texts dating back as early as 1764. In summary, the Pepo were those Plains Indigenous peoples who could still be easily distinguished from the Chinese, whereas the Sek-hoan had already thoroughly adopted Chinese customs, thus exhibiting no trace of their "ancient life".

The Dutch, who had ruled Taiwan for 38 years, have left an imprint on the Plains Indigenous people. The Sinkang manuscripts, which are bilingual land contracts written in Romanised letters, have become important historical documents for studying the Plains Indigenous people. This Romanised tribal language was instructed by the Dutch commissaries in order to teach Christianity. Nevertheless, the Dutch influence on the Plains Indigenous people has been limited to language and religion, reaching merely around the Tainan area. Only the influence of the Han Chinese has been far and long-standing.

In the 17th century, Plains Indigenous peoples were involved in the flourishing deerskin export market. Plains Indigenous hunters often supplied deerskin to the Qing and Dutch regimes, in exchange for cash to trade for other goods and also to pay for taxes enforced under the new regimes. By the 18th century, the deerskin industry had diminished due to over-hunting, and the inflow of Chinese immigrants began to take up much of the grazing land. Therefore, Plains Indigenous peoples increasingly relied on plow agriculture and land rent from Indigenous land reclaimed by Han settlers.

Han settlers initially implemented policies that favoured Plains Indigenous peoples. This was because Han officials feared a revolt against Chinese immigrants, and also because Plains Indigenous peoples were tax-paying citizens and could be used as military sources. Furthermore, the Chinese government initially viewed their expansion as a disruption to the Indigenous people status quo, hence they introduced policies to favour Plains Indigenous peoples. However, Plains Indigenous peoples were increasingly unable to compete economically and ethnically with the growing Chinese population that flooded into Taiwan. Han policies in favour of Plains Indigenous peoples began to disappear, and Han settlers started to remove many of the Plains Indigenous peoples from their original villages. It is within these "political and economic frameworks" that the Plains Indigenous peoples gradually became sinicized.

In the course of their interaction with the Han Chinese, some Plains Indigenous peoples moved to Puli Basin; the Kavalan tribe moved southward to Hualien County and Taitung County; and the Siraya tribe moved to Taitung. However, relocation could not prevent the Plains Indigenous peoples from being assimilated. After the Qing Empire had officially taken over Taiwan, the Plains Indigenous peoples were rapidly sinicized as a result of advocacy for their "civilising". They were forced to dress in Han clothes, change their names, and adopt Han customs.

Plains Indigenous peoples began to adopt aspects of Chinese culture, values, and language. Most importantly, intermarriage between Chinese and Plains Indigenous peoples increased rapidly, leading to the acculturation of the two groups. Many of the early Chinese settlers in Taiwan were not permitted to bring women with them; hence, they married Plains Indigenous women out of necessity. This is the origin of the common saying "there are mainland grandfathers, but no mainland grandmothers" (Chinese: 有唐山公，無唐山媽; Pe̍h-ōe-jī: Ū Tn̂g-soaⁿ kong, bô Tn̂g-soaⁿ má). This extensive intermarriage is the reason that many Taiwanese people today are unaware that they could be descendants of Plains Indigenous peoples. Several theories have been proposed during the 2000s to suggest that a large majority of Hoklo and Hakka Taiwanese could have Plains Indigenous lineage in their bloodline. An increasing number of Taiwanese people are starting to search for their Plains Indigenous roots and claim their status as Plains Indigenous peoples.

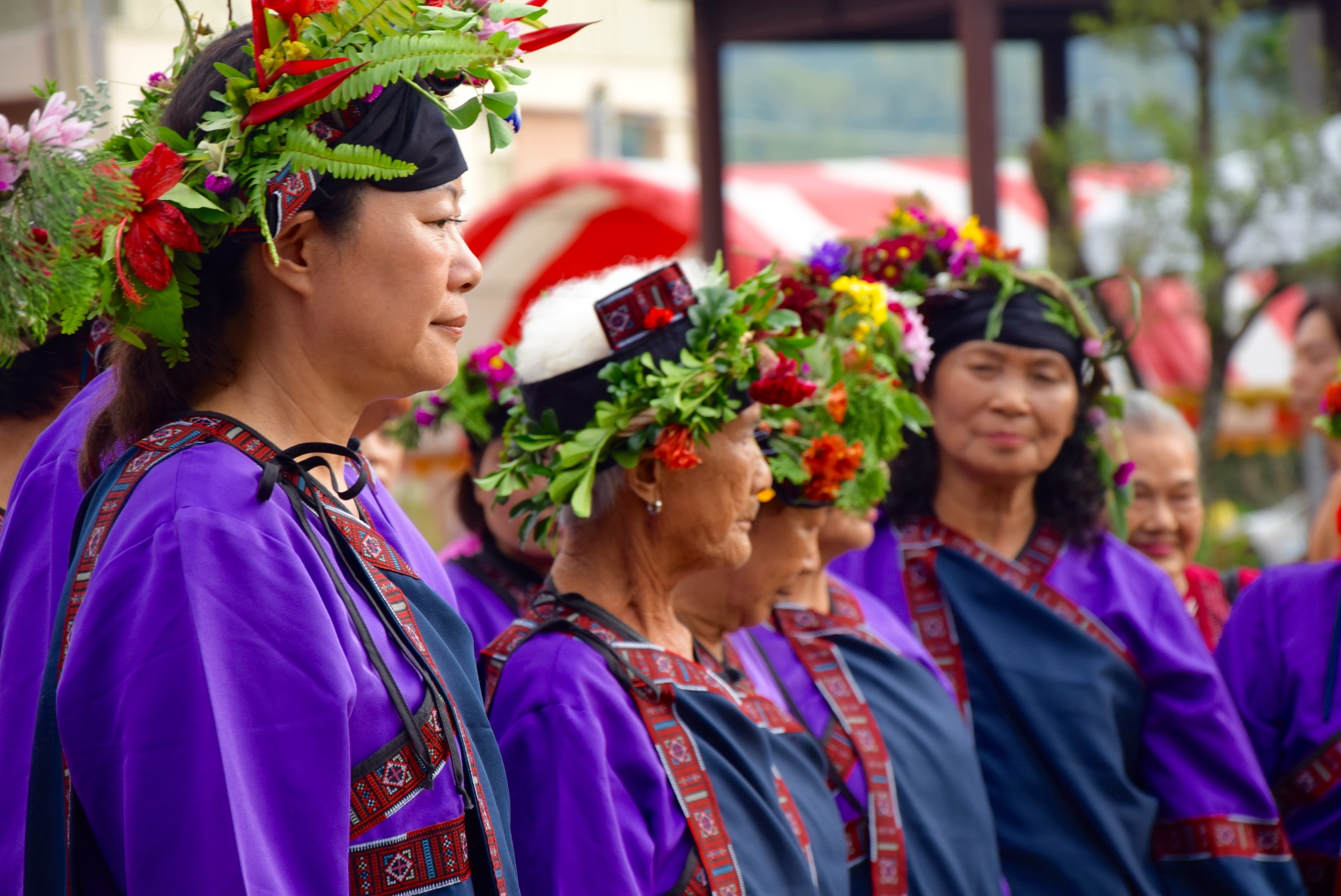
Taivoan women in traditional clothes on the day of the Night Ceremony in Xiaolin community.

=== Plains Indigenous Peoples Recognition Movement ===
After centuries of acculturation, Plains Indigenous peoples are almost completely sinicized. It was already noted in the early 20th century that careful observation was required to detect their deeper eyes as compared to the Chinese; also, the women did not practice foot binding. It is now nearly impossible to distinguish Plains Indigenous peoples without careful inspection. Through the process of acculturation, much of the language, culture, and identity of Plains Indigenous peoples have become nonexistent in modern Taiwanese society. The Republic of China (ROC) government currently only officially recognises the Kavalan and Siraya ethnic groups of all the Plains Indigenous peoples.

Even though there was a lack of attention and interest in the history of Plains Indigenous peoples until the mid-1980s, through the works of scholars, folklorists, anthropologists, historians, and remaining descendants of these groups, there has been a gradual restoration of Plains Indigenous culture, history, identity, and language. For example, a descendant of Plains Indigenous peoples in Hualien, Chieh Wan-lai, still teaches the traditional language and culture of his ethnic group. More educational pamphlets are emerging to teach Taiwanese people about the existence of Plains Indigenous peoples. Furthermore, a campaign was started in Yilan County for descendants of the Kavalan to find their roots. Many Plains Indigenous ceremonies have been revitalized around Taiwan, and these have been opened up to the public and to people who have recently discovered their status as Plains Indigenous peoples.

Ethno-political activities and Nativist Cultural Movements flourished after the 1990s, and a "Plains Aborigine Name Correction Movement" (Plains Indigenous Peoples Recognition Movement) emerged. Several protests occurred in 2001 and 2010, and a formal complaint was sent to the United Nations in 2010, demanding that the ROC government formally recognize Plains Indigenous peoples. Descendants of these groups today continue to fight for the official recognition of their status as Taiwanese Indigenous peoples.

Through the efforts of Indigenous people, Tainan County became the first local government to recognize Siraya people as county-level Indigenous people in 2005, followed by the recognition of local Taivoan, Makatao, and Siraya people by the Fuli Township government in 2013. In 2016, the Pingtung County government announced the recognition of local Makatao. Plains Indigenous peoples have been allowed to register in Kaohsiung City since 2013, but have not yet been recognized as city-level Indigenous peoples. In 2026, the Executive Yuan officially recognized the Siraya as an Indigenous group, the first to be recognized under the Pingpu Indigenous People's Status Act.

The number of people who have successfully registered, as well as ones to whom the Kaohsiung City government has opened registration but who haven't yet been recognized as of 2017, are as follows:

Number of registered Plains Indigenous people (2017)
	Siraya	Taivoan	Makatao	Not Specific	Total
Tainan	11,830	-	-	-	11,830
Kaohsiung	107	129	-	237	473
Pingtung	-	-	1,803	205	2,008
Fuli, Hualien	-	-	-	100	100
Total	11,937	129	1,803	542	14,411

== Classification ==
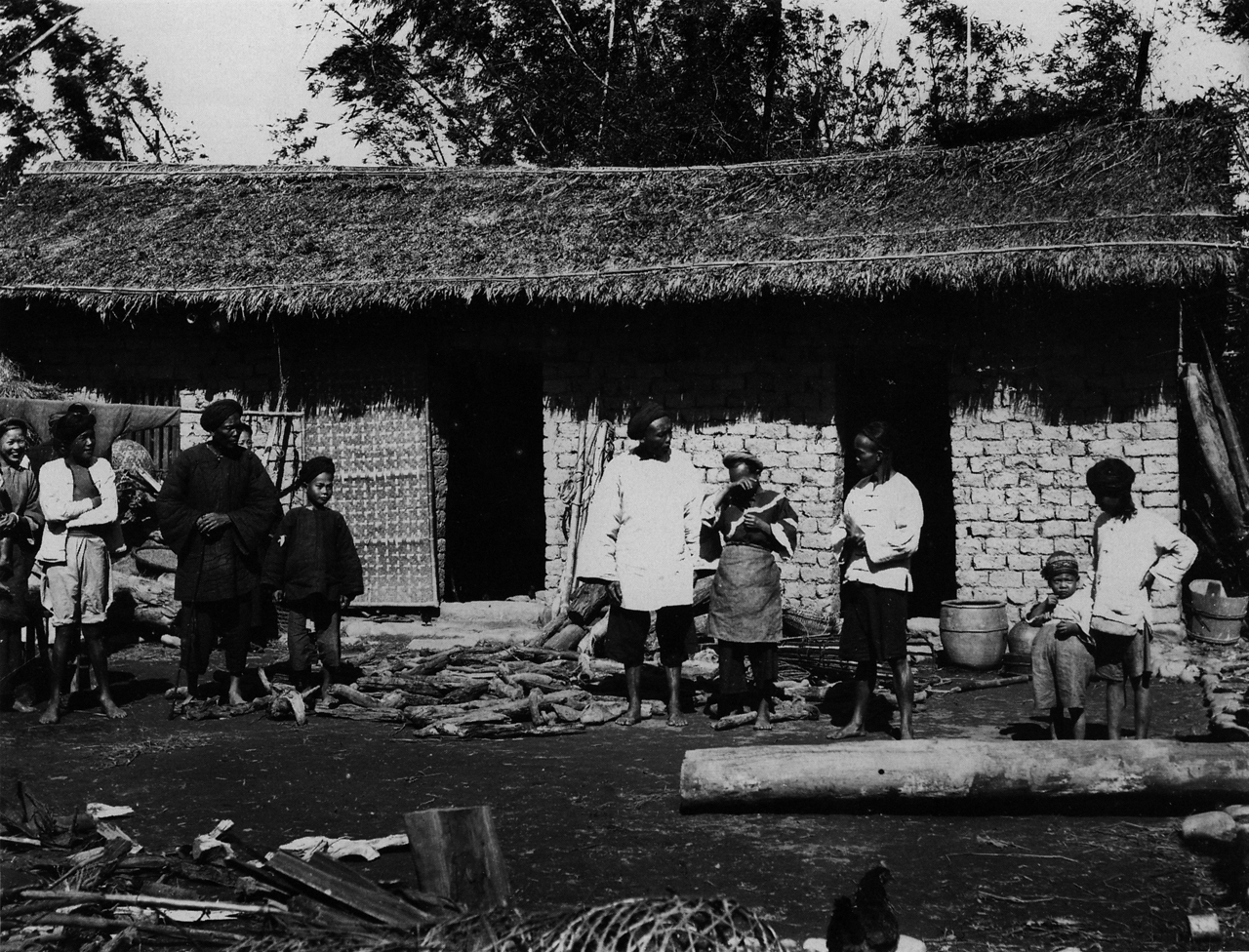
Plains Indigenous people in Taipei in 1897

Plains Indigenous peoples have been classified under different systems throughout history. The Dutch separated them by regions and differentiated them by communities (社名). Huang Shujing, during Qing rule, categorised all Taiwanese Indigenous peoples into thirteen groups, based on geographic location.

It was not until Japanese rule that proper anthropological and ethnographic classification systems of Plains Indigenous peoples were formed. The Japanese studies revealed that Plains Indigenous peoples were not one culture, but in fact consisted of various ethnicities, languages, and cultures. The Japanese extensively studied Taiwanese Indigenous peoples in order to classify, locate, and "civilize" them.

Ethnographer Ino Kanori was the first to create the modern ethnological classification of Plains Indigenous peoples, consisting of the following groups: Makatao, Siraya, Loa, Poavasa, Arikun, Vupuran, Pazehhe, and Kuvarawan. Since then, other scholars such as Shigeru Tsuchida, Utsurikawa Nenozo, Mabuchi Toichi, and Ogawa Naoyoshi have presented various classification systems for Plains Indigenous peoples. There is still no full consensus over whether there are eight, nine, ten, or twelve groups of Plains Indigenous peoples. The major disputes consist of:

- Whether Arikun and Lloa should be classified separately or as one ethnic group.
- Whether Ketagalan should be further divided into separate groups.
- Whether Siraya, Taivoan, and Makatao are separate groups or part of one group; however, based on the latest discovery in linguistics, the three ethnic groups should be considered separate Indigenous peoples.
- Whether Sao are Plains Indigenous or Highland people.

Historical classification of plains Indigenous peoples
Year	Researcher	Names																
1904	Ino, Kanori	Kavarawan	—	Ketagalan				Taokas	Vupuran	Poavosa		Arikun	Lloa	Pazzehe	—	Makattao	Sirajya	
1930	Utsurikawa, Nenozo	Kavarawan	—	Ketagalan				Taokas	Vupuran	Babuza		Hoanya		Pazeh	Sao	Tao	Sirajya	
1935	Ogawa, Naoyoshi	Kavarawan	—	Ketagalan				Taokas	Vupuran	Babuza		Hoanya		Pazzehe	Sao	Sirajya		
1944	Ogawa, Naoyoshi	Kavarawan	—	Luilang	Ketagalan			Taokas	Papora	Babuza		Hoanya		Pazeh	Sao	Sirajya		
1951	張耀錡	Kavalan	—	Ketagalan				Taokas	Papora	Babuza		Hoanya		Pazeh	—	Siraya		Taivoan
1955	李亦園	Kavalan	—	Luilang	Ketagalan			Taokas	Papora	Babuza		Hoanya		Pazeh	Thao	Siraya		
1970	台灣省通志	Kavalan	—	Ketagalan				Taokas	Papora	Babuza		Hoanya		Pazeh	—	Siraya		
1970	台灣省通志	Kavalan	—	Ketagalan				Taokas	Papora	Babuza		Arikun	Lloa	Pazeh	—	Makatao	Siraya	Taivoan
1985– 1991	Tsuchida, Shigeru	Kavalan	—	Ketagalan		Basay	Kulon	Taokas	Papora	Babuza		Hoanya		Pazzahe	—	Makatao	Siraya	Taivoan
1991	Li, Paul Jen-kuei	Kavalan	—	Ketagalan				Babuza				Hoanya		Pazeh	Thao	Siraya		
1991	Li, Paul Jen-kuei	Kavalan	—	Luilang	Trobian	Basay		Taokas	Papora	Babuza	Favorlang	Hoanya		Pazeh	Thao	Makatao	Siraya	Taivoan
1996	Li, Paul Jen-kuei	Kavalan	Qauqaut	Ketagalan			Kulon	Baburan				Hoanya		Pazeh	Thao	Siraya		
1996	Li, Paul Jen-kuei	Kavalan	Qauqaut	Luilang	Trobian	Basay	Kulon	Taokas	Papora	Babuza	Favorlang	Hoanya		Pazeh	Thao	Makatao	Siraya	Taivoan
2006	Li, Paul Jen-kuei	Kavalan	—	Basay (Ketagalan)			Kulon	Taokas	Papora	Babuza		Hoanya		Pazih	Thao	Makatao	Siraya	Taivoan

=== Main peoples ===
Peoples	Early settlement locations
1. Ketagalan	New Taipei, Keelung, and Taoyuan
2. Kavalan	Lanyang Plain
3. Kulon	Taoyuan and partial New Taipei City
4. Taokas	Hsinchu, Miaoli, and the northern region of Tachia River in Taichung
5. Pazeh	Fengyan, Tantzu, Shenkang, and Houli and later spread into Shihkang, Tungshih, and Hsinshe
6. Papora	Coastal plains to the south of Tachia River in Taichung
7. Babuza	Southern region of Tatu River and the northern region of Choshui River
8. Hoanya	Southern region of Wufeng in Taichung and the northern region of Wufeng in Taichung as well as the northern region of Hsinying in Tainan
9. Siraya	Tainan and Kaohsiung
10. Taivoan	Tainan and Kaohsiung
11. Makatao	Kaohsiung and Pingtung

== Culture ==
=== Hunting, fishing, and agriculture ===
Before the arrival of immigrants, Plains Indigenous peoples lived a lifestyle based on agriculture, fishing, and hunting. They produced just enough for their needs. Taros and yams were important in their diets. They used simple tools such as sticks and spades for growing food; to hunt, they used traps, spears, and arrows; to fish, they used nets, baskets, and arrows. Men were usually in charge of fishing and hunting, while women were responsible for farming roles. Their hunting targets were mainly deer and wild boars. There were regular seasons for hunting deer and they refrained from hunting young deer to maintain the ecological balance. The Plains Indigenous peoples once used extensive land for agriculture and hunting.

They solved their disputes by means of betel-nut treats, apologies, or fights. They led a life of self-sufficiency without restriction and suppression from outside regulations or foreign armies. Before the arrival of the Han Chinese, the Plains Indigenous peoples only used simple agricultural tools, such as sticks and spades, to plant millet, taro, and yam. Without knowledge of fertiliser, they found new lands to plant when farmed land was exhausted. When the Dutch occupied Taiwan, they taught the Plains Indigenous peoples farming skills and administered a policy of breeding farm cattle. They indirectly ruled the Indigenous people and managed land cultivation. After their improvement in farming skills, the Plains Indigenous peoples changed their staple crop to rice: this happened more obviously to the southern tribes that had earlier contact with foreigners. The northern tribes still mostly planted millet until the early Qing period.

=== Matriarchal society ===
Plains Indigenous peoples were based around a matriarchal society: women were often the head of the family and in charge of important household affairs. Men usually lived with their wives after marriage, serving the wife's family in the form of physical labour. Females inherited property and passed on lineage. Women were usually in charge of religious issues and men were responsible for political issues.

In Plains Indigenous traditions, singles were free to choose their spouses. There were special parties where young singles could choose their lovers freely, or they could date individually in private. When a single boy was in love with a girl, he would play his harmonica day and night in front of the girl's house. If the girl also liked the boy, they would have a date, giving each other engagement gifts. As Han culture slowly infiltrated, customs of Plains Indigenous peoples also transitioned.

=== Tribal systems ===
Although women had a higher status in the clans, in the tribal system men were superior. Tribes were treated as a singular, collective unit. Leaders of the tribes were chosen based on seniority: the oldest member of the tribe became the leader. The elders were responsible for attending community meetings, at which a community chief was chosen to lead. The elders were also responsible for solving internal and external disputes.

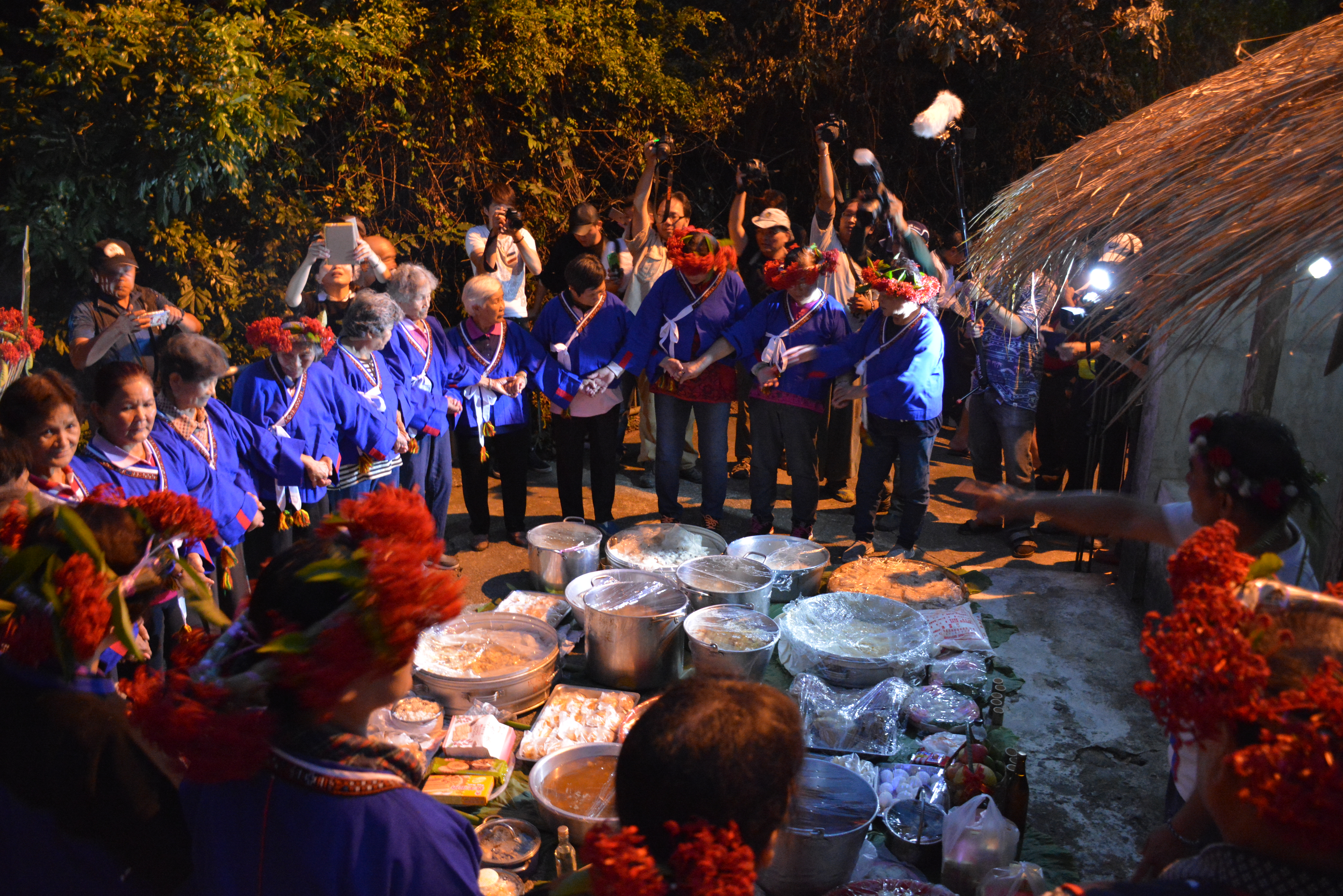
The Night Ceremony of Taivoan people in Alikuan, Kaohsiung

=== Ritual ceremonies ===
Plains Indigenous peoples held ritual ceremonies several times a year, to worship natural and ancestral spirits. They strongly believed in the worshiping of ancestors. Whenever a ceremony was held, the people would gather in the political centre of the tribe, called kunghsieh, and they would drink, sing, dance, and celebrate. Their ballads were mostly merry melodies until the mass invasion of the Han Chinese and their culture was on the verge of diminishing, when they started to create elegies to express the sadness of a disadvantaged people.

During the Qing period, numerous coastal Chinese of the mainland risked their lives to sail to Taiwan for the sake of survival, regardless of the sea prohibition policy of the Qing government. At that time, most Plains Indigenous peoples were assimilated. Their villages mingled with villages of the Han Chinese, resulting in land loss. At first, the Han Chinese still paid the land rent, but as they gained more power, they stopped paying or even bought off the rights. Moreover, the Han Chinese used various methods to plunder lands from the Indigenous people: by purchase, alliance, marriage, forced occupation, or exchange of irrigation sources. Sometimes, they also took advantage of the Indigenous people's drinking habits and cheated on the contracts. The Plains Indigenous peoples thus yielded their living space and scattered elsewhere. Since 1701, the fallow lands and hunting places of the Plains Indigenous peoples gradually become the farmlands of the Han Chinese, which caused major changes in their economic life and social system. Those who refused to migrate were slowly assimilated into Han society, and those who relocated could not avoid the oppression from the Han people or other Indigenous people and had to move again.

Now, the Plains Indigenous peoples are mostly sinicized, and they fluently speak the languages of the Han people. The early Han Chinese that came to Taiwan were mostly single males, who usually took Aboriginal wives.

Since the 1990s, as the ethno-political activities and the Nativist Cultural Movement have flourished on the island, descendants of the Plains Indigenous peoples have also started to demand name correction and joined the Alliance of Taiwan Aboriginal Constitution Movement. Kavalan descendants, such as Chieh Wan-lai, have endeavoured to teach traditional language and culture in Hualien; in 1991, they worked with the Yilan County Government to organise a campaign for the Kavalan to search for their roots, and in 1993, they held a Kavalan Harvest Festival. In addition, the Ketagalan tribe in the north held several cultural activities in 1994 and 1996. Moreover, the descendants of Siraya, Taokas, and Pazeh have also tried to re-establish and pass on their traditions and cultures.

=== Geopolitical culture ===
In spite of their considerable cultural and linguistic differences, the Formosan Plains Austronesians shared a common geopolitical culture in the seventeenth century. This culture manifested itself most materially in the physical structure of Formosan villages, which were protected by plant defenses of bamboo or wooden walls: such defenses could be elaborate. In 1630, for example, inhabitants of the village of Mattau built "a sturdy double wall around their village, the inside filled with clay, as well as a moat and many demi-lunes."

=== Surnames ===
Surnames were an integral part of Plains Indigenous culture. Through the process of acculturation, Plains Indigenous peoples gave up their naming systems and original surnames in favour of adopting Chinese surnames. In the process, several unique surnames were created in conjunction with Indigenous influences; these differed from Hoklo and Hakka surnames.

Some of the unique surnames include 月, 邦, 宜, 機, 翼, 力, 卯, 茆, 同, 念, 東, 岩, 哀, 曷, 埕, 買, 猴, 標, 紅, 雙, 角, 楓, 詩, 樟, 墜, 雛, 乃, 味, 毒, 陣, 盂, 解, 棹, 永, 湖, 振, 偕, 嘪, 掌, 奚, 詠, 倚, 竭, 北, 六, 水, 麗, 崗, 崑, 桌, 牙, 陀, 秘, 烏, 新, 糠, 長, 萇, and 霜.

== Recent developments ==
=== Complaint to the United Nations ===
In 2010, representatives of Plains Indigenous peoples in Taiwan sent an official complaint to the United Nations in Geneva; the complaint outlined the unfairness caused by Plains Indigenous peoples not being formally recognised under the current Republic of China administration. The representatives of the complainants demanded for the groups to be recognised formally as Taiwanese Indigenous People and Austronesian. The complaint was rejected by the United Nations. As a result, a dedicated committee under the name "Pingpu Affairs Task Force" (平埔族群事務推動小組) has been created by the Executive Yuan to deal with Plains Indigenous issues.

=== Plains Indigenous genetic studies ===
Genetic studies conducted by Marie Lin of Mackay Memorial Hospital in 2001, 2008, and 2010 concluded that despite only 1.5 percent of Taiwanese people being registered as Indigenous, there is a strong possibility that over 85% of Taiwanese have Plains Indigenous bloodlines. Lin's research was based on the study of human tissue antigens (HLA) of Hoklo, Hakka, and Plains Indigenous peoples. It was claimed that through hundreds of years of assimilation and intermarriage between Han Chinese and Plains Indigenous peoples, there was a high possibility that genetically, the Hoklo and Hakka bloodlines in Taiwan have been fused with Plains Indigenous bloodlines.

Not long after Lin's 2008 publication, several academics pointed out errors in Lin's statistical analysis, and questioned why some of her numbers contradict each another. Subsequent full genome studies using large sample sizes and comparing thousands of single nucleotide polymorphisms have come to the conclusion that Taiwanese Han people are primarily of mainland Chinese descent and have only very limited genetic mixture with the Indigenous population. Thereafter, Lin herself coauthored a paper with similar conclusions.

Nevertheless, Lin's research has been continuously used by many Taiwanese independence activists to build a Taiwanese identity based on ethnicity. Activists have used Lin's findings to argue the view that the majority of Taiwanese who did not descend from migrants from the Chinese Civil War are not descendants of Han Chinese but rather descendants of Plains Indigenous peoples; and therefore Taiwan should not be considered as part of a Chinese state. However, this position has faced political strain. Taiwanese Plains Indigenous people who have suffered racial and cultural assimilation often despise these so-called "blood nationalists", whom they view as pushing a political agenda by claiming Indigenous status.

== Bibliography ==
- Campbell, William (1915). Sketches from Formosa. London: Marshall Brothers. OL 7051071M.
- Chen, Shu-Juo (2009). How Han are Taiwanese Han? Genetic inference of Plains Indigenous ancestry among Taiwanese Han and its implications for Taiwan identity (Ph.D.). STANFORD UNIVERSITY.
- Davidson, James W. (1903). "Chapter XXX: The Inhabitants of Formosa". The Island of Formosa, Past and Present : history, people, resources, and commercial prospects : tea, camphor, sugar, gold, coal, sulphur, economical plants, and other productions. London and New York: Macmillan. pp. 560–594. OCLC 1887893. OL 6931635M.
- Hsiau, A-chin (2000). Contemporary Taiwanese Cultural Nationalism (1. publ. ed.). New York: Routledge. ISBN 9780415226486.
- Lin, Marie (2010). 我們流著不同的血液 : 以血型.基因的科學證據揭開台灣各族群身世之謎 (in Chinese). Taipei: 前衛. ISBN 9789578016484.
- Matheson, Rich (31 October 2011). "Liuchongsi Pingpu Night Sacrifice". Taiwan Culture Portal. Ministry of Culture, Republic of China (Taiwan).
- Rubinstein, Murray A., ed. (2007). Taiwan: A New History. M.E. Sharpe. ISBN 9780765614940.
- Shepherd, John R. (1996). "From Barbarians to Sinners: Collective Conversion Among Plains Aborigines in Qing Taiwan, 1859-1895". In Bays, Daniel H. (ed.). Christianity in China: From the Eighteenth Century to the Present. California: Stanford University Press. ISBN 9780804726092.
- Tai, Pao-tsun (2007). The Concise History of Taiwan (Chinese-English bilingual ed.). Nantou City: Taiwan Historica. ISBN 9789860109504.
- Nathan (2011-11-09). 從日治時期戶籍資料確定自己是平埔族. Taiwan Tati Cultural and Educational Foundation (in Chinese).
