= Lloa people =

Lloa
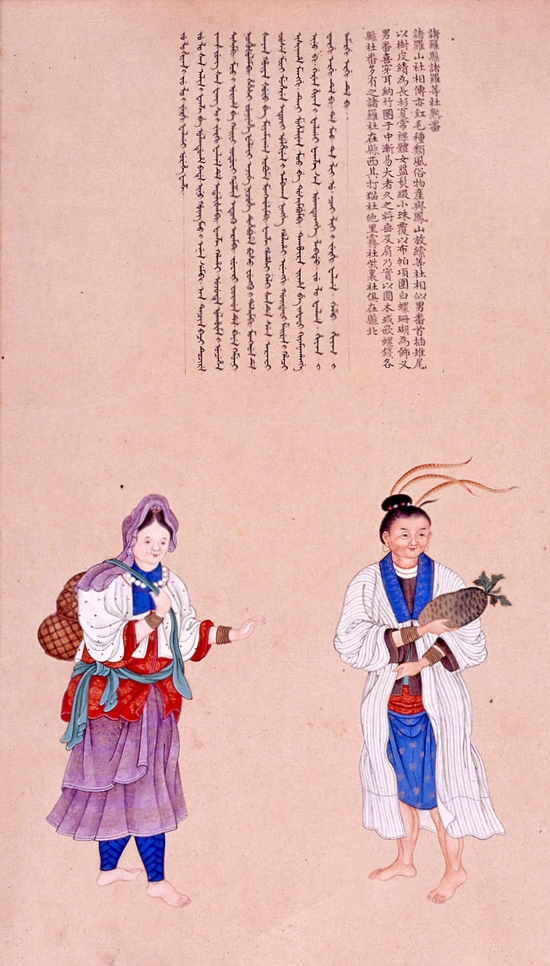
- The illustration depicts some plain indigenous man and woman, possibly of Lloa people, in Tirosen.

Regions with significant populations
- Yunlin and Chiayi in Taiwan

Languages
- Lloa, Taiwanese, Mandarin

Religion
- Animism, Taoism, Buddhism, Christianity

Related ethnic groups
- Hoanya, Arikun

Lloa is a group of Austronesian indigenous Formosan people living in the southern plain of Taiwan from Yunlin, Jiayi, to northern Tainan. They have lived through the Dutch colonization of Taiwan, as well as the Manchurian occupation during the Qing dynasty.

Lloa are generally classified together with the Hoanya and Arikun as a single group, which idea has been rejected by some scholars and the indigenous people themselves.

== See also ==
- Hoanya people
- Arikun people
- Taiwanese indigenous peoples
