= Hoanya people =

Taiwanese Aboriginal people

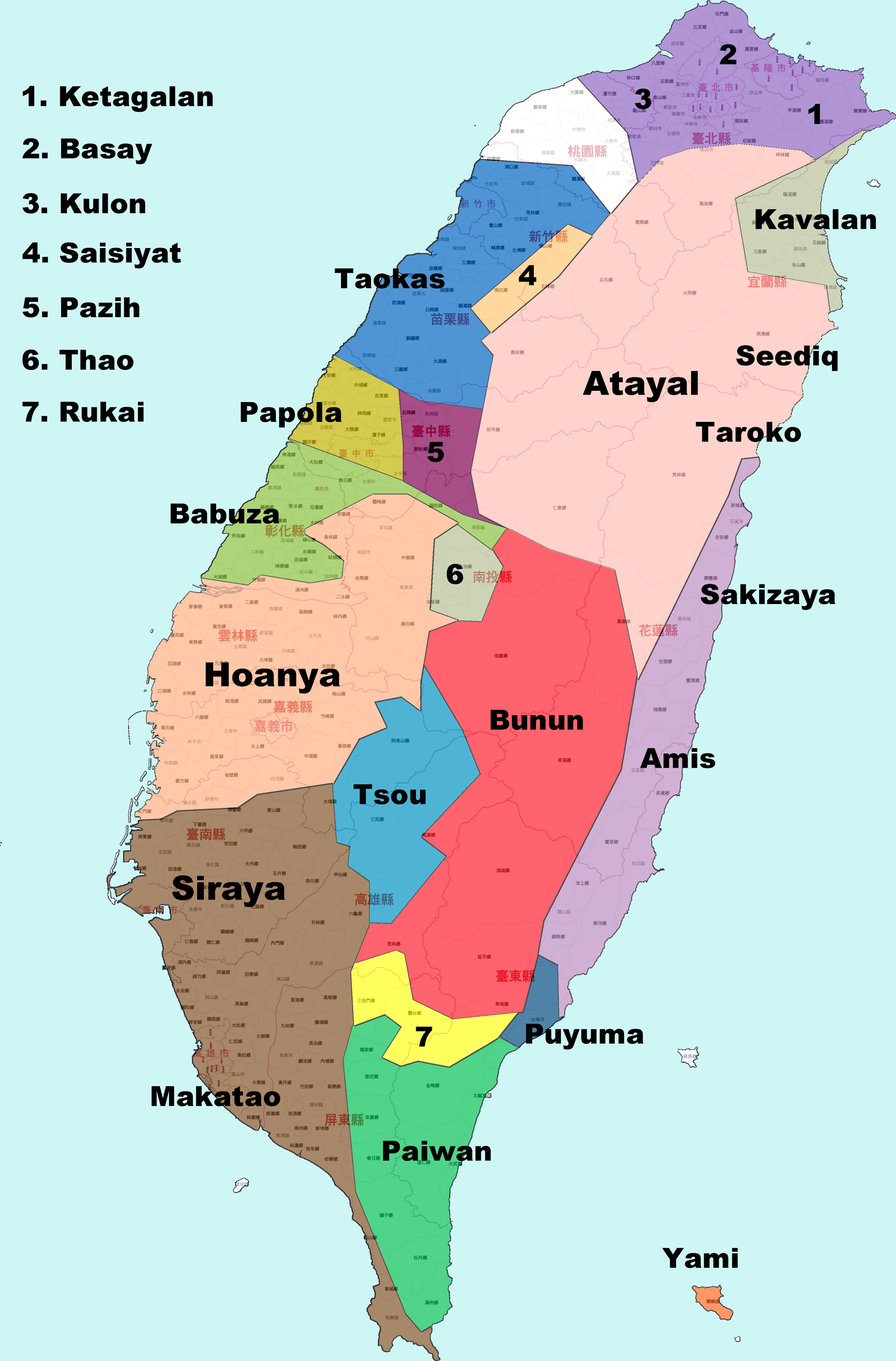
Hoanya people live in middle Taiwan coast area.

The Hoanya (Chinese: 洪雅族; pinyin: Hóngyǎzú) are a Taiwanese aboriginal people who live primarily in Changhua County, Chiayi City, Nantou County, and near Tainan City.

Their language, Hoanya, is now extinct.

The Lloa people and Arikun people are generally considered to be a part of the Hoanya people.

== Etymology ==
Scholars like Kaim Ang suggest the name of the people, Hoanya, comes from Taiwanese Hokkien Hoan-iá (番仔, lit. "barbarian"), originally from the perspective of ethnic Chinese referring to non-Chinese, especially historical natives of Taiwan and Southeast Asia. The name of the people group retained the obsolete diminutive suffix -iá (仔) in Hokkien, which originally came from a weak form of kiáⁿ or káⁿ (囝) and today survives in Hokkien as the diminutive suffix -á (仔). Huán-nià (番仔) is attested in the Dictionario Hispanico Sinicum (1626-1642) and use of the obsolete -iá (仔) suffix is also recorded in Medhurst's 1832 Hokkien dictionary. The modern form of the aforementioned word in Taiwanese Hokkien is Hoan-á (番仔), which over the centuries took on a derogatory connotation in Taiwan in reference to Taiwanese aboriginal groups in general or to any unreasonable persons. However, the same word, Huan-a, has different connotations in other Hokkien-speaking communities, such as in Fujian (China), the Philippines, Malaysia, Singapore and Indonesia.

== See also ==
- Hoanya language
- Kingdom of Middag
- Taiwanese indigenous peoples
