= Arikun people =

Arikun
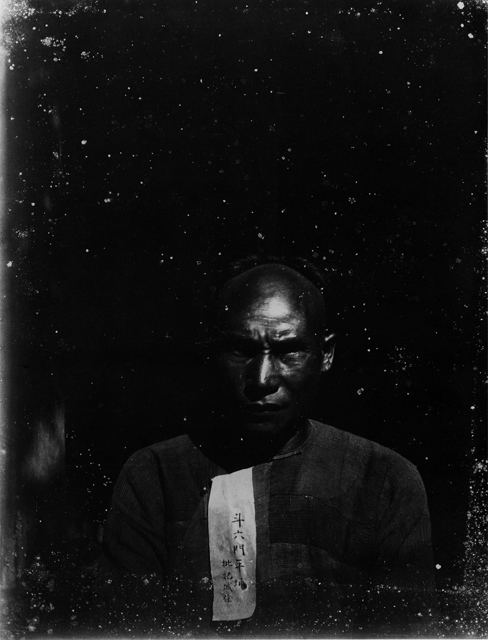
- Portrait of the Plains Indigenous People in Pipa, Puli, possibly an Arukun.

Regions with significant populations
- Nantou, Taichung, and Changhua in Taiwan.

Languages
- Arikun (previously), Taiwanese, Mandarin

Religion
- Animism, Taoism, Buddhism, Christianity

Related ethnic groups
- Hoanya, Lloa

The Arikun are a group of Austronesian indigenous Formosan people living from the western plain to central basin of Taiwan, especially. They have lived through the Dutch colonization of Taiwan, as well as the Manchurian occupation during the Qing dynasty.

Arikun people along with Lloa people used to be classified as a subgroup of Hoanya people, but this concept has been rejected by some scholars, as the name "Hoanya" seems to be a derogatory exonym from huan-á (Southern Min: "the barbarians") by the Chinese immigrants.

In the 19th century, Arikun people were invited by indigenous people living in Puli, Nantou, to migrate there, along with many other plain indigenous peoples from western Taiwan, including the Lloa people. Nowadays, the inhabitants of the eastern and southeastern parts of Puli are mostly descendants of Arukun and Lloa people.

== Communities ==
Some indigenous communities founded by Arikun in the 18th century include:

- Man Talack (萬斗六社) in nowadays Taichung, a community resided by both Arikun and Babuza.
- Kakar Barroroch (貓羅社) in nowadays Changhua.
- Tausa Mato (北投社) in nowadays Nantou.
- Tausa Talakey (南投社) in nowadays Nantou.

== Language ==
Some comparison of the words from Arikun communities with those from Lloa as compile by Ogawa (2006):

| PAn | Arikun | | Lloa | | |
| PAn | Tausa Mato | Tausa Talakey | Dovaha | Tirosen | |
| *maCa | matha, masa | miju | masa | masa | "eye" |
| *qalima | pira, pila, pilat, pilas | pira | | pirya, pidjet, piza | "hand" |
| *quluh | ulu, uru, unung | ulu | ulu | uru, udzu, ulu | "head" |
| *Sikan | sikan | | tskan | spkan, sikkan | "fish" |
| *qiNaS, *bulaN | bulas | | | itat | "moon" |
| *siNaR | iza, idzak | | | ilaha | "sun" |
| *asa, *esa | mesa, misa | misha | hiparya | lisat, kipara, kipala | "one" |
| *telu | misu, miru | mishi | myateru | tilo, tsinlo, myaterun, miatelu | "three" |
| *Sepat | mipal, mipat, mipas | mishaha | myapa | ipa, apa, sipute | "four" |
| *lima | hima, mi-lim, lima | mintai | myaru | lima, mialima-fun, malima-hon | "five" |

== Films and television ==
The movie Ataabu, released in 2015, narrates the story of the Lin family, which was connected to the rise and prosperity of central Taiwan in the mid-19th century. It is named after the Arikun tribe Ataabu, which is known as Wufeng nowadays.

== See also ==
- Taiwanese indigenous peoples
- Hoanya people
- Lloa people
