= Ketagalan people =

Aboriginal people of Taiwan

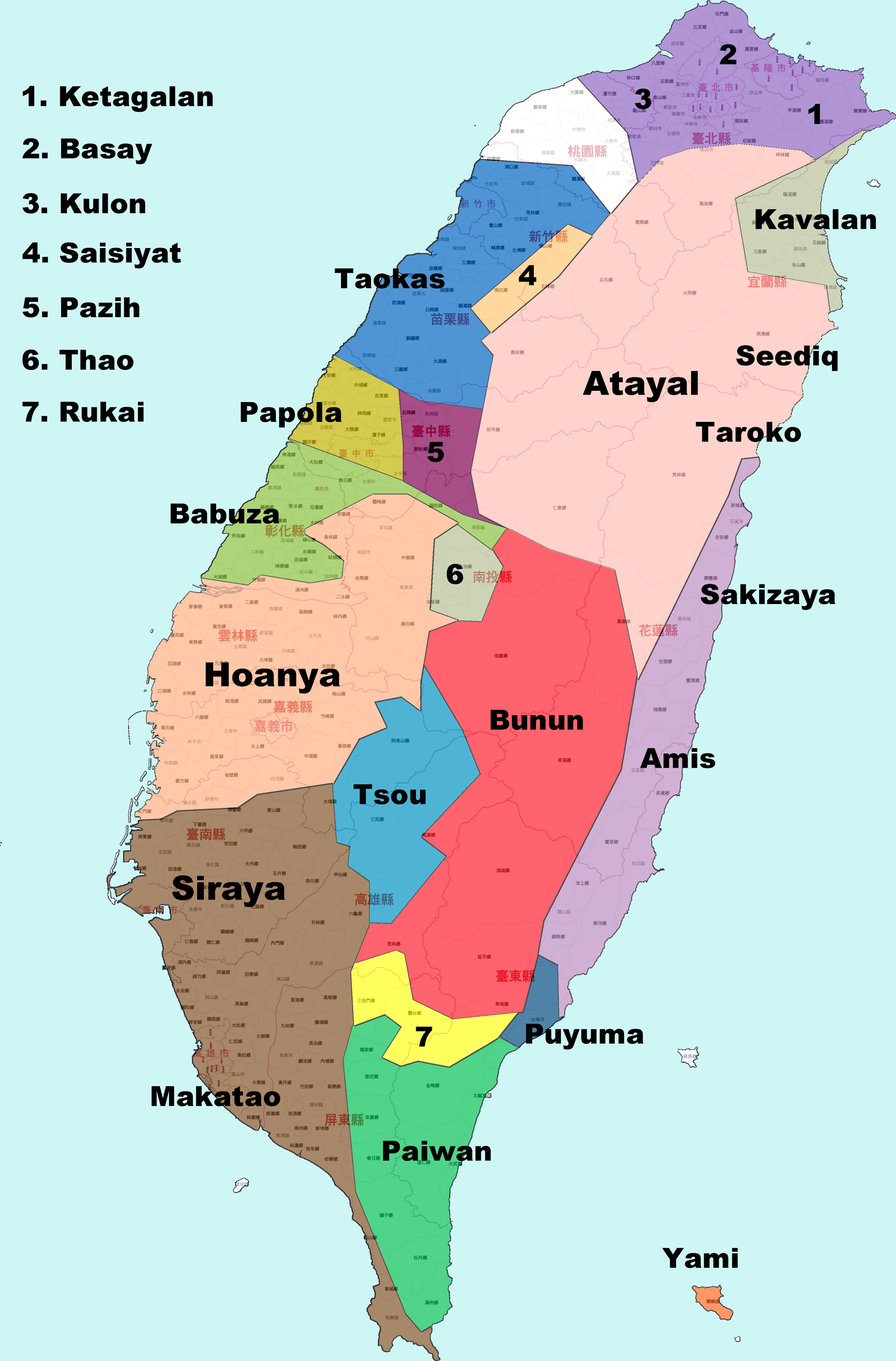
Ketagalan people live in northern Taiwan. '1' is a different people called by the same name; the Ketagalan described here are located between '2' and '3'.

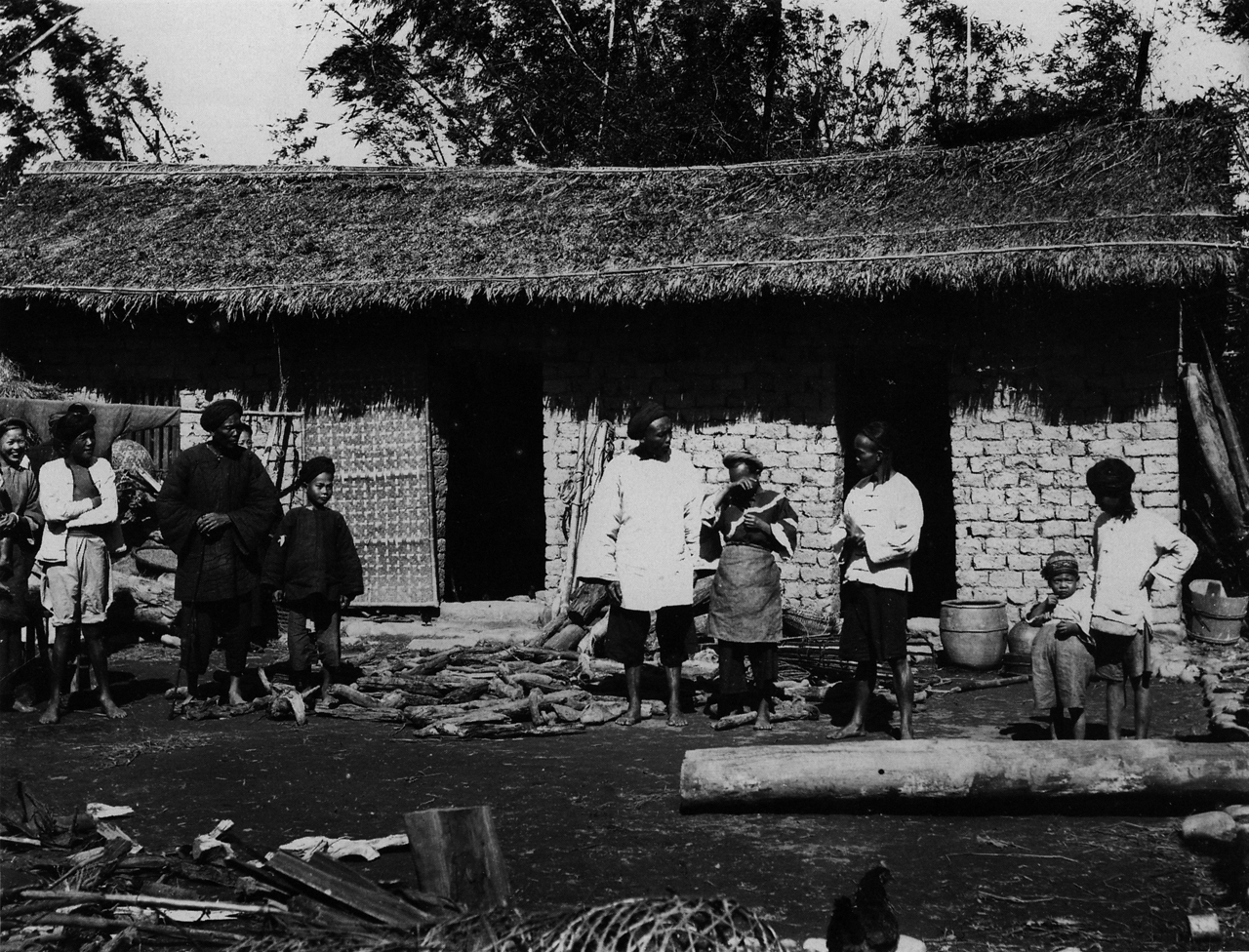
Ketagalan people

Ketagalan or Ketangalan (traditional Chinese: 凱達格蘭族; simplified Chinese: 凯达格兰族; pinyin: Kǎidágélán Zú) are a Taiwanese aboriginal people originating in what is now the Taipei Basin. Their language has now become extinct.

On 21 March 1996, the road in front of the Presidential Office Building was renamed from "Long Live Chiang Kai-shek" Road (介壽路) to Ketagalan Boulevard (凱達格蘭大道) by then-mayor of Taipei City, Chen Shui-bian, to commemorate the people. Traffic signs banning motorcycles and bicycles from that road were abolished at the same time.

Beitou District in Taipei City houses the Ketagalan Culture Center, a cultural center about the Ketagalan people.

== Folklore ==
Legend has it that the Ketagalan forebears originally lived on another island, Sanasay. One day, a monster appeared on the island. Every night it would appear in the village, terrorizing the villagers. Accordingly, the villagers laid traps for the monster all around their homes and fields. The wounded monster was forced back into the mountains and the village was peaceful again for a while, but soon afterward it reappeared. Pushed to insanity by hunger, the monster went into one of the village homes and killed a child. The villagers lived in fear of being eaten and did not dare to sleep. The villagers fiercely debated but nobody could think of a way to deal with the monster.

With no other choice, it was decided that they must pack up and leave the island. Following an arduous sea voyage, they sighted land. The island they landed on was Taiwan, near the Shuang River in the north. Many years later, the community was growing so one day the villagers agreed to draw straws. Those who drew long straws were permitted to remain living on the fertile plain while those drawing the short straws would have to move into the mountains. Thereafter, the villagers were separated into plain-dwelling and mountain-dwelling peoples.

== See also ==
'Ketagalen' is a generic term for all the peoples of the northern plains of Taiwan. It encompasses the Basay and other Taiwanese indigenous peoples.
