= Hunting in Taiwan =

Hunting has a long history in Taiwan but is now generally restricted to indigenous communities and the control of invasive agricultural pests.

== History ==
Hunting is an essential component of Taiwanese indigenous cultures and is at the center of many indigenous traditions and practices. Many traditional food practices are based around game. Traditionally the women of most tribal groups did not hunt.

Deerskins were one of the primary trade goods that sparked Dutch interest in Taiwan. The commercialization of deer hunting led to unsustainable hunting pressure and the collapse of deer herds in most areas, especially in the lowlands where they had once been extremely common. The Formosan sika deer was extirpated from much of Taiwan by intensive commercial hunting. Most of the deerskins purchased by Dutch traders were exported to Japan.

The last wild Formosan sika deer was killed in 1979 rendering it technically extinct however the species was later reintroduced into the wild from captive populations.

Hunting and firearms was heavily restricted in the early 1980s. Commercial hunting was banned in 1989. In the 21st century there was an increase in interest from young indigenous Taiwanese in hunting, primarily to maintain cultural traditions and ties to ancestral lands. Given its strong place in indigenous culture and the history of its regulation as part of colonial policies to detach indigenous people from their land and erase their cultures hunting emerged as a significant political issue in Taiwan.

In 2021 Taiwan's Constitutional Court struck down some restrictions on indigenous hunting as unconstitutional but upheld some of the most significant, including prohibitions against hunting protected species and firearms restrictions.

In 2023 a co-management pilot program in which the government would work with the local indigenous huntering community on cultural, land, and wildlife management issues was set up.

In 2025 new legislation added claw traps to the list of banned hunting equipment.

In 2025 an indigenous member of the New Taipei City Council brought his traditional hunting rifle to a council session as a formal protest against what he considered to be the central government's overly restrictive gun storage laws.

=== Whaling ===
Commercial whaling was introduced by Japanese colonialists in 1913 and continued under Japanese control in World War Two. The practice was restarted by Kuomintang (KMT) authorities in 1955. It was eventually outlawed in 1981 under significant international pressure.

=== Illegal hunting ===
Many indigenous hunters see hunting restrictions as restrictions on their fundamental human rights and ancestral traditions. Some engage in poaching (illegal hunting). 329 indigenous hunters were prosecuted for illegal hunting from 2003 to 2017.

In 2025 three Vietnamese nationals were arrested for illegally hunting leopard cats.

=== Invasive species ===
In the 21st century the green iguana has become a harmful invasive species in Taiwan which does significant damage to farms. In order to reduce their population the government has issues annual bounties on them. They are often hunted with slingshots. In 2025 the Ministry of Agriculture (Taiwan) set a quota of 120,000 for the green iguana control program.

== See also ==
- Firearms regulation in Taiwan
- Formosan black bear
- Formosan sambar deer
- Reeves's muntjac
- Taiwan serow
- Formosan clouded leopard
- Water deer
