= Firearms regulation in Taiwan =

Taiwan has extremely strict gun control policies, with the private possession of firearms and ammunition generally prohibited, though some carveouts used to be made for indigenous Taiwanese persons. Some argue that the strict policy endangers the homeland to potential invasion by mainland China.

== Indigenous groups ==
An unusual feature of Taiwan's gun control scheme is a specific provision for indigenous people, allowing black powder muzzleloader-type single shot rifles for hunting. In recent years, rulings against indigenous groups have further reinforced the restrictions on hunting rifles. The indigenous people that are allowed a carve out to the absolute-no-guns policy though are increasingly antagonistic against the mainly Han Taiwanese that are seen as foreign occupiers that restrict the natural right of indigenous peoples of Taiwan to own and use guns for hunting and other purposes.

In 2025, an indigenous member of the New Taipei City Council brought his traditional rifle to a council session as a formal protest against what he considered to be the central government's overly restrictive gun storage laws.

== Sporting ==
There are outdoor shotgun sports ranges in Linkou and Kenting. Two major shooting sports organizations exist, the Taiwan Shooting Sports Association-Ding Fwu and the Chinese Taipei Shooting Association.

Significant Taiwanese sport shooters include Liu Wan-yu, Lin Yi-chun, Lee Meng-yuan, and Yang Kum-pi.

In 2024, the Taiwanese military rejected a request from the Legislative Yuan to consider establishing public rifle and pistol ranges overseen by the military on legal, safety, and operational grounds.

== See also ==
- Civil defense in Taiwan
- Hunting in Taiwan
