= Battle of Shalu Village =

Battle that took place in Taiwan in 1670

The Battle of Shalu Village (沙轆社之役) was a battle that took place in Taiwan in 1670, and is related to Han people's settler colonialism against Taiwanese indigenous.

== Chronology ==
Two factors served as the catalyst for this incident:

1. To implement the strategy of "incorporating soldiers into agriculture", large numbers of Zheng forces engaged in military farming on the plains of southwestern Taiwan, cultivating over 18,454 hectares of land. This action not only deprived the indigenous peoples within the Kingdom of Middag of their traditional living areas, threatening their survival, but also led to multiple conflicts between the two sides.
2. During the transitional period of Zheng Chenggong's campaign to conquer Taiwan, Frontline Commander, was ordered to lead soldiers and their families to cultivate land in central Taiwan. There, they encountered the Kingdom of Middag. The Kingdom of Middag superficially welcomed them with songs and dances, even hosting a banquet for the Zheng army. That very night, however, they launched a surprise attack on the Zheng camp. Ultimately, 1,500 Zheng soldiers perished. This incident cemented the enmity between the Kingdom of Middag and the Zheng regime.

In 1664, Zheng Jing retreated to Taiwan and dispatched Liu Guoxuan to cultivate land at Banxian. At that time, the Ming-Zheng regime's territorial expansion threatened the Kingdom of Middag, which ruled the Taichung area. Conflict between the two sides had become inevitable due to the two reasons mentioned earlier.

In 1670, the Papora people mounted armed resistance. Left Military Commander Liu Guoxuan successively campaigned against the Papora people. He dispatched troops to massacre hundreds of Papora military personnel and civilians, leaving only six survivors in the entire settlement. After this battle, the Kingdom of Tungning massacred indigenous people, seized their land, cleared it, and built their own farms and buildings.

== See also ==
- Indigenous response to colonialism
