= Taiwanese indigenous peoples =

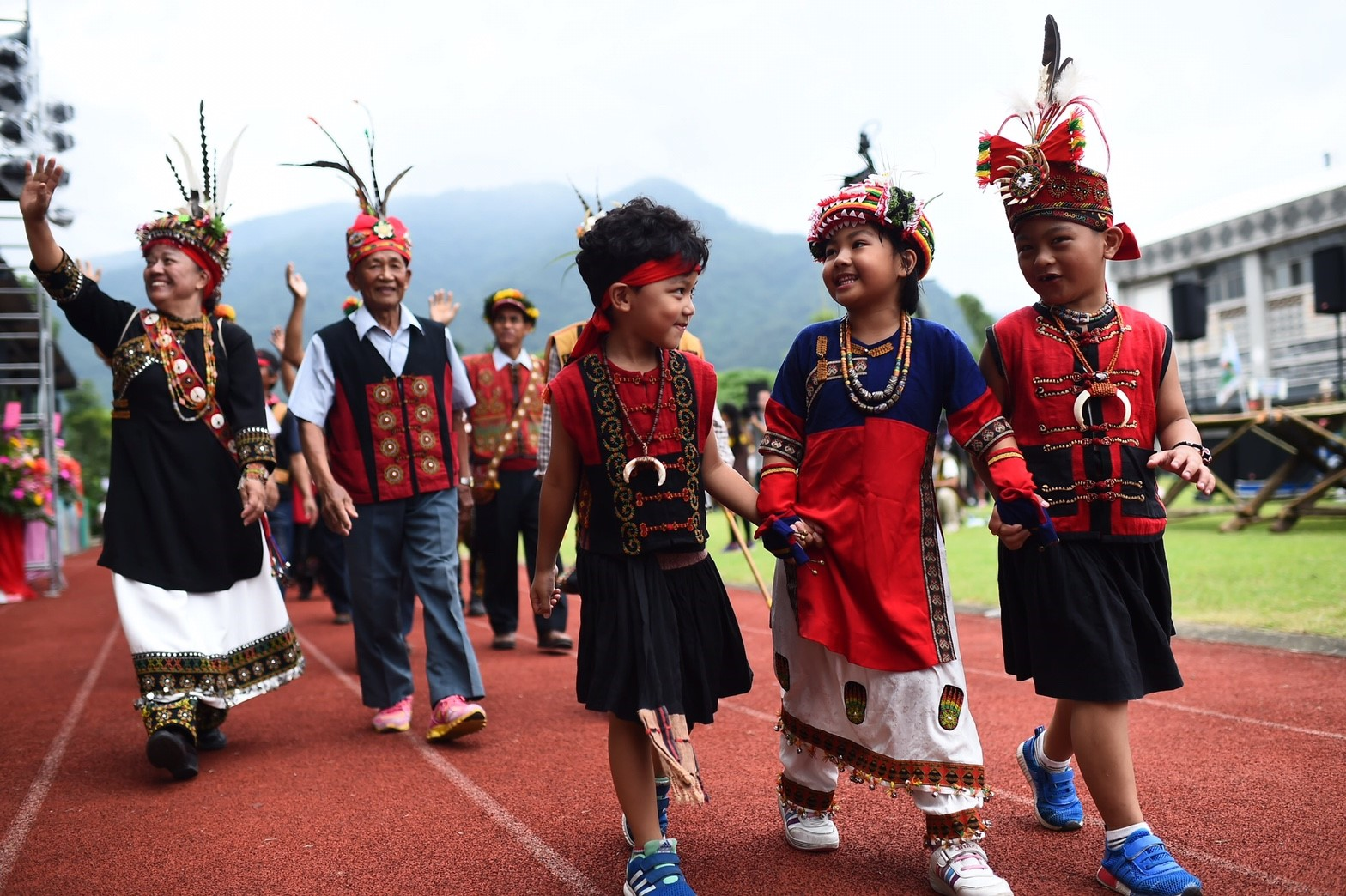
- Paiwan and Rukai people in Pingtung County

Total population
- ~600,303 or 3% of the population of Taiwan (Non-status and unrecognized indigenous peoples excluded); 3,479 in the People's Republic of China (2020 data)

Regions with significant populations
- Taiwan; Taiwan (island), Orchid Island, Green Island, and Liuqiu Island

Languages
- Formosan languages (Atayal, Bunun, Amis, Paiwan, others) or Yami language Chinese languages (Mandarin, Hokkien, Hakka); Japanese language (Yilan Creole Japanese)

Religion
- Predominantly; Christianity; Minority: Animism and Buddhism

Related ethnic groups
- Taiwanese people, other Austronesians

Taiwanese indigenous peoples
- Traditional Chinese: 臺灣原住民
- Simplified Chinese: 台湾原住民
- Literal meaning: Taiwanese original inhabitants
Transcriptions
Standard Mandarin
- Hanyu Pinyin: Táiwān yuánzhùmín
- Bopomofo: ㄊㄞˊ ㄨㄢ ㄩㄢˊ ㄓㄨˋ ㄇㄧㄣˊ
- Wade–Giles: T'ai^{2}-wan^{1} yüan^{2}-chu^{4}-min^{2}
- Tongyong Pinyin: Táiwan yuán-jhù-mín
- IPA: [tʰǎɪ.wán ɥɛ̌n.ʈʂû.mǐn]
Hakka
- Romanization: Toi^{2} van ngian^{2} cu^{4} min^{2}
- Pha̍k-fa-sṳ: Thòi-vân Ngièn-chhu-mìn
Southern Min
- Hokkien POJ: Tâi-ôan gôan-chū-bîn
- Tâi-lô: Tâi-uân guân-tsū-bîn

Taiwanese indigenous peoples, formerly called Taiwanese aborigines, are the indigenous peoples of Taiwan, with the nationally recognized subgroups numbering about 600,303 or 3% of the country's population. This total is increased to more than 800,000 if the indigenous peoples of the plains in Taiwan are included, pending future official recognition. When including those of mixed ancestry, such a number is possibly more than a million. Archeological research suggests that humans have been living on Taiwan for at least 30,000 years. A wide body of evidence suggests that the Taiwanese indigenous peoples had maintained regular trade networks with numerous regional cultures of Southeast Asia before Han Chinese settled on the island from the 17th century, at the behest of the Dutch colonial administration and later by successive governments towards the 20th century.

Taiwanese indigenous peoples are Austronesians with linguistic, genetic, and cultural ties to other Austronesian peoples. Taiwan is the origin and linguistic homeland of the oceanic Austronesian expansion, whose descendant groups today include the majority of the ethnic groups throughout many parts of East and Southeast Asia as well as Oceania and even Africa, which includes Brunei, Timor-Leste, Indonesia, Malaysia, Madagascar, Philippines, Micronesia, Island Melanesia, and Polynesia.

For centuries Taiwan's indigenous inhabitants experienced economic competition and military conflict with a series of colonizing newcomers. Centralized government policies designed to foster language shift and cultural assimilation, as well as continued contact with the colonizers through trade, inter-marriage, and other intercultural processes, have resulted in varying degrees of language death and loss of original cultural identity. For example, of the approximately 26 known languages of the Taiwanese indigenous peoples – collectively referred to as the Formosan languages – at least ten are now extinct, five are moribund, and several are to some degree endangered. These languages are of unique historical significance, since most historical linguists consider Taiwan to be the original homeland of the Austronesian languages and all of its primary branches, except for Malayo-Polynesian, exist only on Taiwan.

Due to discrimination or repression throughout the centuries, the indigenous peoples of Taiwan have experienced economic and social inequality, including a high unemployment rate and substandard education. Some indigenous groups today continue to be unrecognized by the government. Since the early 1980s many indigenous groups have been actively seeking a higher degree of political self-determination and economic development. The revival of ethnic pride is expressed in many ways by the indigenous peoples, including the incorporation of elements of their culture into cultural commodities such as cultural tourism, pop music, and sports. Taiwan's Austronesian speakers were formerly distributed over much of the Taiwan archipelago, including the Central Mountain Range villages along the alluvial plains, as well as Orchid Island, Green Island, and Liuqiu Island.

The bulk of contemporary Taiwanese indigenous peoples mostly reside both in their traditional mountain villages as well as increasingly in Taiwan's urban areas. There are also the plains indigenous peoples who have always lived in the lowland areas of the island. Ever since the end of the White Terror, some efforts have been under way in indigenous communities to revive traditional cultural practices and preserve their distinct traditional languages on the now Han Chinese majority island and for the latter to better understand more about them.

== Terminology ==
=== Collective ===
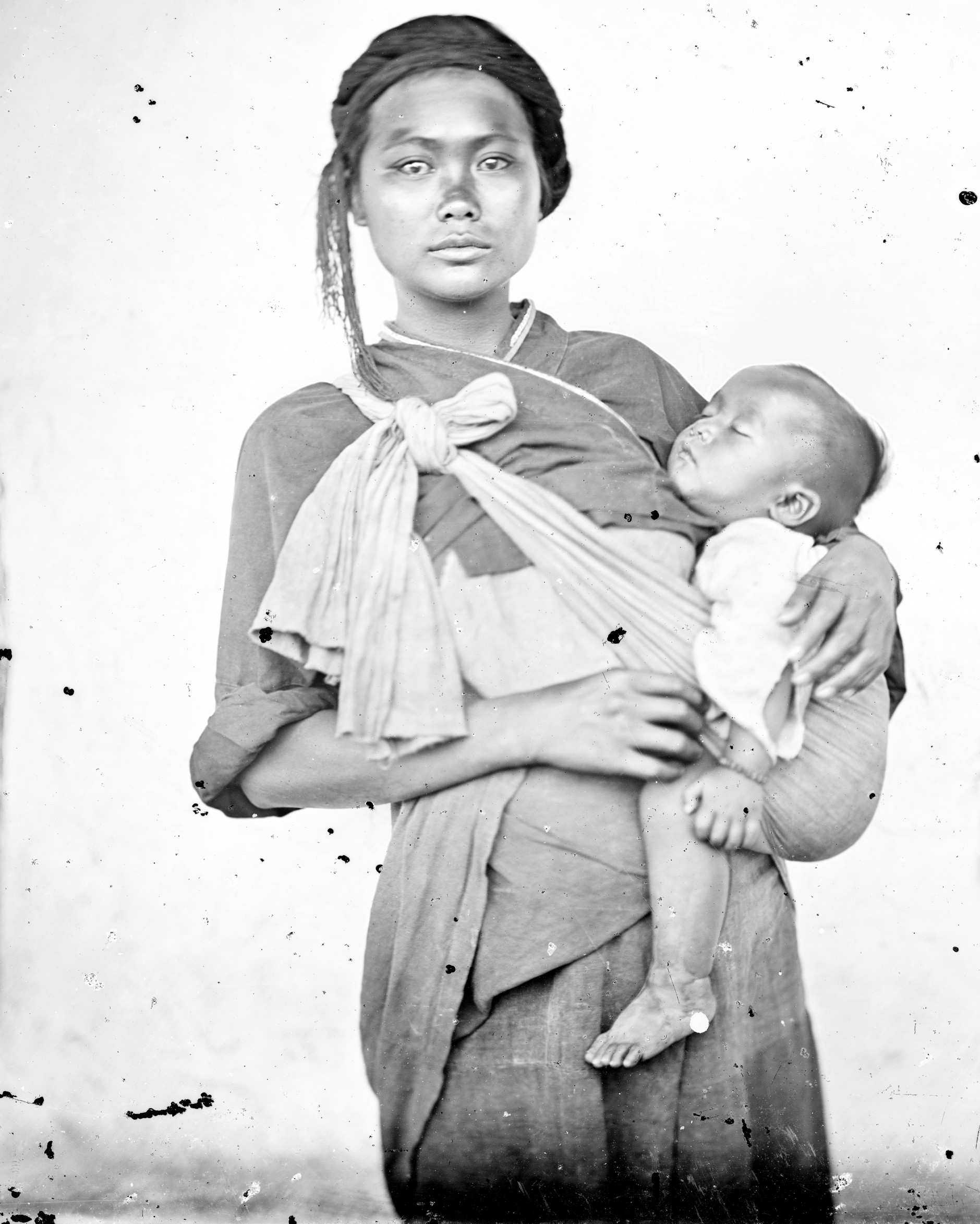
A Taiwanese indigenous woman and infant, by John Thomson, 1871

The Ming Dynasty sailor Chen Di, in his Record of the Eastern Seas (1603), identifies the indigenous people of Taiwan as simply "Eastern Savages" (東番; Dongfan), while the Dutch referred to Taiwan's original inhabitants as "Indians" or "blacks", based on their prior colonial experience in what is currently Indonesia.

Beginning nearly a century later, as the rule of the Qing Empire expanded over wider groups of people, writers and gazetteers recast their descriptions away from reflecting degree of acculturation and toward a system that defined the indigenous relative to their submission or hostility to Qing rule. Qing used the term "raw (meaning unfamiliar, wild, or uncivilized)" (生番) to define those people who had not submitted to Qing rule and "cooked (meaning familiar, tamed, or civilized)" (熟番) for those who had pledged their allegiance through their payment of a head tax. (Note: In the case of travel writings, the Qing literati use of "raw" and "cooked" are closer in meaning to "unfamiliar" and "familiar", on the basis of culture/language and interaction with Han settlers.) According to the standards of the Qianlong Emperor and successive regimes, the epithet "cooked" was synonymous with having assimilated to Han cultural norms and living as a subject of the Empire, but it retained a pejorative designation to signify the perceived cultural lacking of the non-Han people. This designation reflected the prevailing idea that anyone could be civilized/tamed by adopting Confucian social norms.

In English these peoples have also been called Formosans, Native Taiwanese, and Austronesian Taiwanese. The name Gaoshan is also the official label for all indigenous Taiwanese in the People's Republic of China, though indigenous Taiwanese people dislike this label, as it means "high mountains" and disregards plains indigenous.

=== Tribes ===
As the Qing consolidated their power over the plains and struggled to enter the mountains in the late 19th century, the terms Pingpu (平埔族; Píngpǔzú; 'Plains peoples') and Gaoshan (高山族; Gāoshānzú; 'High Mountain peoples') were used interchangeably with the epithets "civilized" and "uncivilized". During Japanese rule (1895–1945) anthropologists from Japan maintained the binary classification. In 1900 they incorporated it into their own colonial project by employing the term Peipo (平埔) for the "civilized tribes" and creating a category of "recognized tribes" for the indigenous who had formerly been called "uncivilized". The Musha Incident of 1930 led to many changes in indigenous policy, and the Japanese government began referring to them as Takasago people (高砂族, Takasago-zoku).

Gaoshan peoples included the Atayal, Bunun, Tsou, Saisiat, Paiwan, Puyuma, and Amis peoples. The Tao (Yami) and Rukai were added later, for a total of nine recognized peoples. During the early period of Chinese Nationalist Kuomintang (KMT) rule the terms Shandi Tongbao (山地同胞) "mountain compatriots" and Pingdi Tongbao (平地同胞) "plains compatriots" were invented to remove the presumed taint of Japanese influence and reflect the place of Taiwan's indigenous people in the Chinese Nationalist state. The KMT later adopted the use of all the earlier Japanese groupings except Peipo.

Despite recent changes in the field of anthropology and a shift in government objectives, the Pingpu and Gaoshan labels in use today maintain the form given by the Qing to reflect indigenous peoples' acculturation to Han culture. The current recognized indigenous are all regarded as Gaoshan, though the divisions are not and have never been based strictly on geographical location. The Amis, Saisiat, Tao and Kavalan are all traditionally Eastern Plains cultures. The distinction between Pingpu and Gaoshan people continues to affect Taiwan's policies regarding indigenous peoples and their ability to participate effectively in government.

Although the ROC's Government Information Office officially lists 16 major groupings as "tribes", the consensus among scholars maintains that these 16 groupings do not reflect any social entities, political collectives, or self-identified alliances dating from pre-modern Taiwan. These divisions did not always correspond to distinctions drawn by the indigenous themselves. The earliest detailed records, dating from the Dutch arrival in 1624, describe the indigenous as living in independent villages of varying sizes. Between these villages there was frequent trade, intermarriage, warfare, and alliances against common enemies. Using contemporary ethnographic and linguistic criteria these villages have been classed by anthropologists into more than 20 broad (and widely debated) ethnic groupings, which were never united under a common polity, kingdom, or "tribe". However, the categories have become so firmly established in government and popular discourse over time that they have become de facto distinctions, serving to shape in part today's political discourse within the Republic of China (ROC) and affecting Taiwan's policies regarding indigenous peoples.

Population of officially recognized Taiwanese indigenous peoples in 1911
Atayal	Saisiyat	Bunun	Tsou	Rukai	Paiwan	Puyuma	Amis	Yami	Total
27,871	770	16,007	2,325	13,242	21,067	6,407	32,783	1,487	121,950

Since 2005 some local governments, including Tainan City in 2005, Fuli, Hualien in 2013, and Pingtung County in 2016, have begun to recognize Taiwanese Plain Indigenous peoples. As of 2017, the numbers of those successfully registered (including Kaohsiung City Government which has opened for registration but is not yet recognized) are:

	Siraya	Taivoan	Makatao	Not Specific	Total
Tainan	11,830	–	–	–	11,830
Kaohsiung	107	129	–	237	473
Pingtung	–	–	1,803	205	2,008
Fuli, Hualien	–	–	–	100	100
Total	11,937	129	1,803	542	14,411

== Recognized peoples ==
=== Indigenous ethnic groups recognized by Taiwan ===
Clickable imagemap of highland peoples according to traditional geographical distribution. Alternate spellings or names: Pazih (Pazeh); Taroko (Truku, Seediq); Yami (Tao); Amis (Pangcah)

Taiwan officially recognizes distinct groups among the indigenous community based upon the qualifications drawn up by the Council of Indigenous Peoples (CIP). To gain this recognition, communities must gather a number of signatures and a body of supporting evidence with which to successfully petition the CIP. Formal recognition confers certain legal benefits and rights upon a group, as well as providing them with the satisfaction of recovering their separate identity as an ethnic group. As of July 2026, 17 groups have been recognized.

The Council of Indigenous Peoples consider several limited factors in a successful formal petition. The determining factors include collecting member genealogies, group histories and evidence of a continued linguistic and cultural identity. The lack of documentation and the extinction of many indigenous languages as the result of colonial cultural and language policies have made the prospect of official recognition of many ethnicities a remote possibility. Current trends in ethno-tourism have led many former Plains Indigenous peoples to continue to seek cultural revival.

Among the Plains groups (the Pingpu Indigenous Peoples) that have petitioned for official status, only the Kavalan, Sakizaya and Siraya have been officially recognized.

Other indigenous groups or subgroups that have pressed for recovery of legal indigenous status include Chimo (who have not formally petitioned the government, see Lee 2003), Kakabu, Makatao, Pazeh, Siraya, and Taivoan. The act of petitioning for recognized status, however, does not always reflect any consensus view among scholars that the relevant group should in fact be categorized as a separate ethnic group. The Siraya became the 17th ethnic group to be recognized on 30 July 2026.

There is discussion among both scholars and political groups regarding the best or most appropriate name to use for many of the groups and their languages, as well as the proper romanization of that name. Commonly cited examples of this ambiguity include (Seediq/Sediq/Truku/Taroko) and (Tao/Yami).

Nine groups were originally recognized before 1945 by the Japanese government. The Thao, Kavalan and Truku were recognized by Taiwan's government in 2001, 2002 and 2004 respectively. The Sakizaya were recognized as the 13th ethnic group on 17 January 2007, and on 23 April 2008, the Sediq were recognized as Taiwan's 14th official ethnic group. Previously, the Sakizaya had been listed as Amis and the Sediq as Atayal. Hla'alua and Kanakanavu were recognized as the 15th and 16th ethnic groups on 26 June 2014. A full list of the recognized ethnic groups of Taiwan, as well as some of the more commonly cited unrecognized peoples, is as follows:

Recognized: Amis/Pangcah, Atayal, Bunun, Hla'alua, Kanakanavu, Kavalan, Paiwan, Puyuma, Rukai, Saisiyat, Tao, Thao, Tsou, Truku, Sakizaya and Sediq, Siraya.
Locally recognized: Makatao (in Pingtung and Fuli , Taivoan (in Fuli)
Unrecognized: Babuza, Basay, Hoanya, Ketagalan, Luilang, Pazeh/Kaxabu, Papora, Qauqaut, Taokas, Trobiawan.

=== Indigenous Taiwanese in the PRC ===
The People's Republic of China (PRC) officially recognizes indigenous Taiwanese as one of its ethnic groups under the name Gāoshān (高山, lit. 'high mountain') The 2000 census identified 4,461 Gāoshān living in mainland China; other surveys suggest this accounted for 1,500 Amis, 1,300 Bunun, 510 Paiwan, with the remainder ,belonging to other peoples. They are descendants of indigenous Taiwanese migrants to the mainland before the 1949 establishment of the People's Republic of China. In Zhengzhou, Henan, there exists a "Taiwan Village" (台灣村) whose inhabitants' ancestors migrated from Taiwan during the Kangxi era of the Qing dynasty. In 2005, 2,674 people of the village identified themselves as Gaoshan.

== Assimilation and acculturation ==
Archaeological, linguistic and anecdotal evidence suggest that Taiwan's indigenous peoples have undergone a series of cultural shifts to meet the pressures of contact with other societies and new technologies. Beginning in the early 17th century, indigenous Taiwanese faced broad cultural change as the island became incorporated into the wider global economy by a succession of competing colonial regimes from Europe and Asia. In some cases, groups of indigenous people resisted colonial influence, but other groups and individuals readily aligned with the colonial powers. This alignment could be leveraged to achieve personal or collective economic gain, collective power over neighboring villages or freedom from unfavorable societal customs and taboos involving marriage, age-grade and child birth.

Particularly among the Plains indigenous people, as the degree of the "civilizing projects" increased during each successive regime, the indigenous people found themselves in greater contact with outside cultures. The process of acculturation and assimilation sometimes followed gradually in the wake of broad social currents, particularly the removal of ethnic markers (such as bound feet, dietary customs and clothing), which had formerly distinguished ethnic groups on Taiwan. The removal or replacement of these brought about an incremental transformation from "Fan" (番, barbarian) to the dominant Confucian "Han" culture. During the Japanese and KMT periods, centralized modernist government policies rooted in ideas of Social Darwinism and culturalism directed education, genealogical customs and other traditions toward ethnic assimilation.

Within the Taiwanese Han Hoklo community itself, differences in culture indicate the degree to which mixture with indigenous took place, with most pure Hoklo Han in Northern Taiwan having almost no indigenous admixture, which is limited to Hoklo Han in Southern Taiwan. Plains indigenous who were mixed and assimilated into the Hoklo Han population at different stages were differentiated by the historian Melissa J. Brown between "short-route" and "long-route" The ethnic identity of assimilated Plains indigenous in the immediate vicinity of Tainan was still known since a pure Hoklo Taiwanese girl was warned by her mother to stay away from them. The insulting name "fan" was used against Plains indigenous by the Taiwanese, and the Hoklo Taiwanese speech was forced upon indigenous people like the Pazeh. Hoklo Taiwanese has replaced Pazeh and driven it to near extinction. Indigenous status has been requested by Plains indigenous peoples.

=== Current forms of assimilation ===
Many of these forms of assimilation are still at work today. For example, when a central authority nationalizes one language, it attaches economic and social advantages to the prestige language. As generations pass, use of the indigenous language often fades or disappears, and linguistic and cultural identity recedes as well. However, some groups are seeking to revive their indigenous identities. One important political aspect of this pursuit is petitioning the government for official recognition as a separate and distinct ethnic group.

The complexity and scope of indigenous assimilation and acculturation in Taiwan have led to three general narratives of Taiwanese ethnic change. The oldest holds that Han migration from Fujian and Guangdong in the 17th century pushed the Plains indigenous peoples into the mountains, where they became the Highland peoples of today. A more recent view asserts that through widespread intermarriage between Han and indigenous between the 17th and 19th centuries, the indigenous were completely Sinicized. Finally, modern ethnographical and anthropological studies have shown a pattern of cultural shift mutually experienced by both Han and Plains indigenous, resulting in a hybrid culture. Today people who comprise Taiwan's ethnic Han demonstrate major cultural differences from Han elsewhere.

=== Surnames and identity ===
Several factors encouraged the assimilation of the Plains indigenous. (Note: One account of this "identity shift" occurs in the area called Rujryck by the Dutch, now part of Taipei city. A document signed by the village heads dating from the seventh year of the Qianlong era states: "We originally had no surnames, please bestow on us the Han surnames, Pan, Chen, Li, Wang, Tan, etc.") Taking a Han name was a necessary step in instilling Confucian values in the indigenous. Confucian values were necessary to be recognized as a full person and to operate within the Confucian Qing state. A surname in Han society was viewed as the most prominent legitimizing marker of a patrilineal ancestral link to the Yellow Emperor (Huang Di) and the Five Emperors of Han mythology. Possession of a Han surname, then, could confer a broad range of significant economic and social benefits upon indigenous, despite a prior non-Han identity or mixed parentage. In some cases, members of Plains indigenous adopted the Han surname Pan (潘) as a modification of their designated status as Fan (番: "barbarian"). One family of Pazeh became members of the local gentry.

In many cases, large groups of immigrant Han would unite under a common surname to form a brotherhood. Brotherhoods were used as a form of defense, as each sworn brother was bound by an oath of blood to assist a brother in need. The brotherhood groups would link their names to a family tree, in essence, manufacturing a genealogy based on names rather than blood, and taking the place of the kinship organizations commonly found in China. The practice was so widespread that today's family books are largely unreliable. Many Plains indigenous joined the brotherhoods to gain protection of the collective as a type of insurance policy against regional strife, and through these groups they took on a Han identity with a Han lineage.

The degree to which any one of these forces held sway over others is unclear. Preference for one explanation over another is sometimes predicated upon a given political viewpoint. The cumulative effect of these dynamics is that by the beginning of the 20th century, the Plains indigenous were almost completely acculturated into the larger ethnic Han group, and had experienced nearly total language shift from their respective Formosan languages to Chinese. In addition, legal barriers to the use of traditional surnames persisted until the 1990s, and cultural barriers remain. Indigenous peoples were not permitted to use their indigenous traditional names on official identification cards until 1995, when a ban on using indigenous names dating from 1946 was finally lifted. One obstacle is that household registration forms allow a maximum of 15 characters for personal names. However, indigenous names are still phonetically translated into Chinese characters, and many names require more than the allotted space. In April 2022, the Constitutional Court ruled that Article 4, Paragraph 2 of the Status Act for Indigenous Peoples was unconstitutional. The paragraph, which reads "Children of intermarriages between Indigenous Peoples and non-Indigenous Peoples taking the surname of the indigenous father or mother, or using a traditional Indigenous Peoples name, shall acquire Indigenous Peoples status," was ruled unconstitutional after a non-indigenous father had taken his daughter to a household registration office to register her Truku descent. Though the applicant was of Truku descent through her mother, her application used her father's Chinese surname and was denied. The Constitutional Court ruled that the law, as written, was a violation of gender equality guaranteed by Article 7 of the Constitution, since children in Taiwan usually take their father's surname, which in practice, meant that indigenous status could be acquired via paternal descent, but not maternal descent.

== History ==
A map showing the migration of the Austronesians out of Taiwan from c. 3000 BC

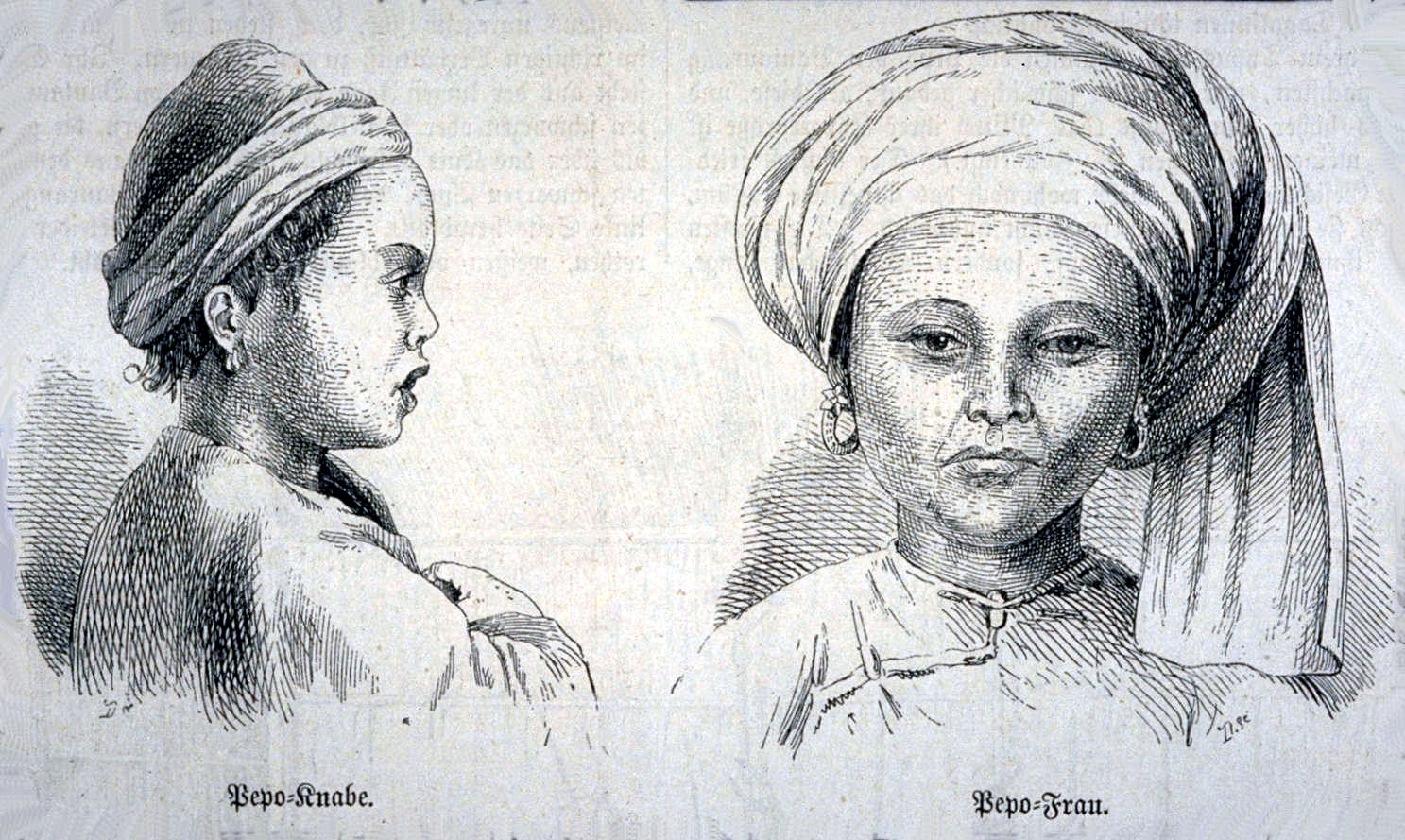
Plains Indigenous boy and woman by Paul Ibis, 1877

Indigenous Taiwanese are Austronesian peoples, with linguistic and genetic ties to other Austronesian ethnic groups, such as peoples of the Philippines, Malaysia, Indonesia, Madagascar, and Oceania. Stone tools dating from around 30,000 years ago at the Baxian Caves suggest that the initial human inhabitants of Taiwan were Paleolithic non-Austronesian Negrito peoples of the Pleistocene era. Archeological evidence points to an abrupt change to the Neolithic era around 6,000 years ago, with the advent of agriculture, domestic animals, polished stone adzes and pottery. The stone adzes were mass-produced on Penghu and nearby islands, from the volcanic rock found there. This suggests heavy sea traffic took place between these islands and Taiwan at this time.

From around 5000 to 1500 BC, Taiwanese indigenous peoples started a seaborne migration to the island of Luzon in the Philippines, intermingling with the older Negrito populations of the islands. This was the beginning of the Austronesian expansion. They spread throughout the rest of the Philippines and eventually migrated further to the other islands of Southeast Asia, Micronesia, Island Melanesia, Polynesia, and Madagascar. Taiwan is the homeland of the Austronesian languages.

There is evidence that indigenous Taiwanese continued trading with the Philippines in the Sa Huynh-Kalanay Interaction Sphere. Eastern Taiwan was the source of jade for the lingling-o jade industry in the Philippines and the Sa Huỳnh culture of Vietnam. This trading network began between the animist communities of Taiwan and the Philippines, which later became the Maritime Jade Road, one of the most extensive sea-based trade networks of a single geological material in the prehistoric world. It was in existence for 3,000 years from 2000 BCE to 1000 CE.

Four centuries of non-indigenous rule can be viewed through several changing periods of governing power and shifting official policy toward indigenous. From the 17th century until the early 20th, the impact of the foreign settlers—the Dutch, Spanish, and Han—was more extensive on the Plains peoples. They were far more geographically accessible than the Mountain peoples, and thus had more dealings with the foreign powers. The reactions of indigenous people to imperial power show not only acceptance, but also incorporation or resistance through their cultural practices.

By the beginning of the 20th century, the Plains peoples had largely been assimilated into contemporary Taiwanese culture as a result of European and Han colonial rule. Until the latter half of the Japanese colonial era the Mountain peoples were not entirely governed by any non-indigenous polity. However, the mid-1930s marked a shift in the intercultural dynamic, as the Japanese began to play a far more dominant role in the culture of the Highland groups. This increased degree of control over the Mountain peoples continued during Kuomintang rule. Within these two broad eras, there were many differences in the individual and regional impact of the colonizers and their "civilizing projects". At times the foreign powers were accepted readily, as some communities adopted foreign clothing styles and cultural practices (Harrison 2003), and engaged in cooperative trade in goods such as camphor, deer hides, sugar, tea, and rice. At numerous other times changes from the outside world were forcibly imposed.

=== Plains indigenous peoples ===
The plains indigenous peoples mainly lived in stationary village sites surrounded by defensive walls of bamboo. The village sites in southern Taiwan were more populated than other locations. Some villages supported a population of more than 1,500 people, surrounded by smaller satellite villages. Siraya villages were constructed of dwellings made of thatch and bamboo, raised 2 m (6.6 ft) from the ground on stilts, with each household having a barn for livestock. A watchtower was located in the village to look out for headhunting parties from the Highland peoples. The concept of property was often communal, with a series of conceptualized concentric rings around each village. The innermost ring was used for gardens and orchards that followed a fallowing cycle around the ring. The second ring was used to cultivate plants and natural fibers for the exclusive use of the community. The third ring was for exclusive hunting and deer fields for community use. The plains indigenous peoples hunted herds of spotted Formosan sika deer, Formosan sambar deer and Reeves's muntjac as well as conducting light millet farming. Sugar and rice were grown as well, but mostly for use in preparing wine.

Many of the plains indigenous peoples were matrilineal/matrifocal societies. A man married into a woman's family after a courtship period during which the woman was free to reject as many men as she wished. In the age-grade communities, couples entered into marriage in their mid-30s when a man would no longer be required to perform military service or hunt heads on the battlefield. In the matriarchal system of the Siraya, it was also necessary for couples to abstain from marriage until their mid-30s, when the bride's father would be in his declining years and would not pose a challenge to the new male member of the household. It was not until the arrival of the Dutch Reformed Church in the 17th century that the marriage and child-birth taboos were abolished. There is some indication that many of the younger members of Sirayan society embraced the Dutch marriage customs as a means to circumvent the age-grade system in a push for greater village power. Almost all indigenous peoples in Taiwan have traditionally had a custom of sexual division of labor. Women did the sewing, cooking and farming, while the men hunted and prepared for military activity and securing enemy heads in headhunting raids, which was a common practice in early Taiwan. Women were also often found in the office of priestesses or mediums to the gods.

For centuries, Taiwan's indigenous peoples experienced economic competition and military conflict with a series of colonizing peoples. Centralized government policies designed to foster language shift and cultural assimilation, as well as continued contact with the colonizers through trade, intermarriage and other dispassionate intercultural processes, have resulted in varying degrees of language death and loss of original cultural identity. For example, of the approximately 26 known languages of the Taiwanese indigenous (collectively referred to as the Formosan languages), at least ten are extinct, five are moribund and several are to some degree endangered. These languages are of unique historical significance, since most historical linguists consider Taiwan to be the original homeland of the Austronesian language family.

=== Contact with Chinese ===
Early Chinese histories refer to visits to eastern islands that some historians identify with Taiwan. Troops of the Three Kingdoms state of Eastern Wu are recorded visiting an island known as Yizhou in the spring of 230. They brought back several thousand natives but 80 to 90 percent of the soldiers died to unknown diseases. Some scholars have identified this island as Taiwan while others do not. The Book of Sui relates that Emperor Yang of the Sui dynasty sent three expeditions to a place called "Liuqiu" early in the 7th century. They brought back captives, cloth, and armour. The Liuqiu described by the Book of Sui had pigs and chickens but no cows, sheep, donkeys, or horses. It produced little iron, had no writing system, taxation, or penal code, and was ruled by a king with four or five commanders. The natives used stone blades and practiced slash-and-burn agriculture to grow rice, millet, sorghum, and beans. Later, the name Liuqiu (whose characters are read in Japanese as "Ryukyu") referred to the island chain to the northeast of Taiwan, but some scholars believe it may have referred to Taiwan in the Sui period.

During the Yuan dynasty (1271–1368), Han Chinese people started visiting Taiwan. The Yuan emperor Kublai Khan sent officials to the Ryukyu Kingdom in 1292 to demand its loyalty to the Yuan dynasty, but the officials ended up in Taiwan and mistook it for Ryukyu. After three soldiers were killed, the delegation immediately retreated to Quanzhou in China. Another expedition was sent in 1297. Wang Dayuan visited Taiwan in 1349 and noted that the customs of its inhabitants were different from those of Penghu's population, but did not mention the presence of other Chinese. He mentioned the presence of Chuhou pottery from present day Lishui, Zhejiang, suggesting that Chinese merchants had already visited the island by the 1340s.

By the early 16th century, increasing numbers of Chinese fishermen, traders and pirates were visiting the southwestern part of the island. Some merchants from Fujian were familiar enough with the indigenous peoples of Taiwan to speak Formosan languages. The people of Fujian sailed closer to Taiwan and the Ryukyus in the mid-16th century to trade with Japan while evading Ming authorities. Chinese who traded in Southeast Asia also began taking an East Sea Compass Course (dongyang zhenlu) that passed southwestern and southern Taiwan. Some of them traded with the Taiwanese indigenous. During this period, Taiwan was referred to as Xiaodong dao ("little eastern island") and Dahui guo ("the country of Dahui"), a corruption of Tayouan, a tribe that lived on an islet near modern Tainan from which the name "Taiwan" is derived. By the late 16th century, Chinese from Fujian were settling in southwestern Taiwan. The Chinese pirates Lin Daoqian and Lin Feng visited Taiwan in 1563 and 1574 respectively. Lin Daoqian was a pirate from Chaozhou who fled to Beigang in southwestern Taiwan and left shortly after. Lin Feng moved his pirate forces to Wankan (in modern Chiayi County) in Taiwan on 3 November 1574 and used it as a base to launch raids. They left for Penghu after being attacked by natives and the Ming navy dislodged them from their bases. He later returned to Wankan on 27 December 1575 but left for Southeast Asia after losing a naval encounter with Ming forces on 15 January 1576. The pirate Yan Siqi also used Taiwan as a base. In 1593, Ming officials started issuing ten licenses each year for Chinese junks to trade in northern Taiwan. Chinese records show that after 1593, each year five licenses were granted for trade in Keelung and five licenses for Tamsui. However, these licenses merely acknowledged already existing illegal trade at these locations.

Initially, Chinese merchants arrived in northern Taiwan and sold iron and textiles to the Taiwanese indigenous peoples in return for coal, sulfur, gold, and venison. Later, the southwestern part of Taiwan surpassed northern Taiwan as the destination for Chinese traders. The southwest had mullet fish, which drew more than a hundred fishing junks from Fujian each year during winter. The fishing season lasted six to eight weeks. Some of them camped on Taiwan's shores and many began trading with the indigenous people for deer products. The southwestern Taiwanese trade was of minor importance until after 1567 when it was used as a way to circumvent the ban on Sino-Japanese trade. The Chinese bought deerskins from the indigenous and sold them to the Japanese for a large profit.

When a Portuguese ship sailed past southwestern Taiwan in 1596, several of its crew members who had been shipwrecked there in 1582 noticed that the land had become cultivated and now had people working it, presumably by settlers from Fujian. When the Dutch arrived in 1623, they found about 1,500 Chinese visitors and residents. Most of them were engaged in seasonal fishing, hunting, and trading. The population fluctuated throughout the year peaking during winter. A small minority brought Chinese plants with them and grew crops such as apples, oranges, bananas, watermelons. Some estimates of the Chinese population put it at 2,000. There were two Chinese villages. The larger one was located on an island that formed the Bay of Tayouan. It was inhabited year-round. The smaller village was located on the mainland and would eventually become the city of Tainan. In the early 17th century, a Chinese man described it as being inhabited by pirates and fishermen. One Dutch visitor noted that an indigenous village near the Sino-Japanese trade center had a large number of Chinese and there was "scarcely a house in this village ... that does not have one or two or three, or even five or six Chinese living there." The villagers' speech contained many Chinese words and sounded like "a mixed and broken language".

Chen Di visited Taiwan in 1603 on an expedition against the Wokou pirates. General Shen of Wuyu defeated the pirates and met a native chieftain named Damila who presented them with gifts. Chen witnessed these events and wrote an account of Taiwan known as Dongfanji (An Account of the Eastern Barbarians). According to Chen, Zheng He visited the natives but they remained hidden. Afterwards they came into contact with Chinese people from the harbors of Huimin, Chonglong, and Lieyu in Zhangzhou and Quanzhou. They learned their languages to trade with them. Chinese items such as agate beads, porcelain, cloth, salt, and brass were traded in return for deer meat, skins, and horns.

=== European period (1623–1662) ===
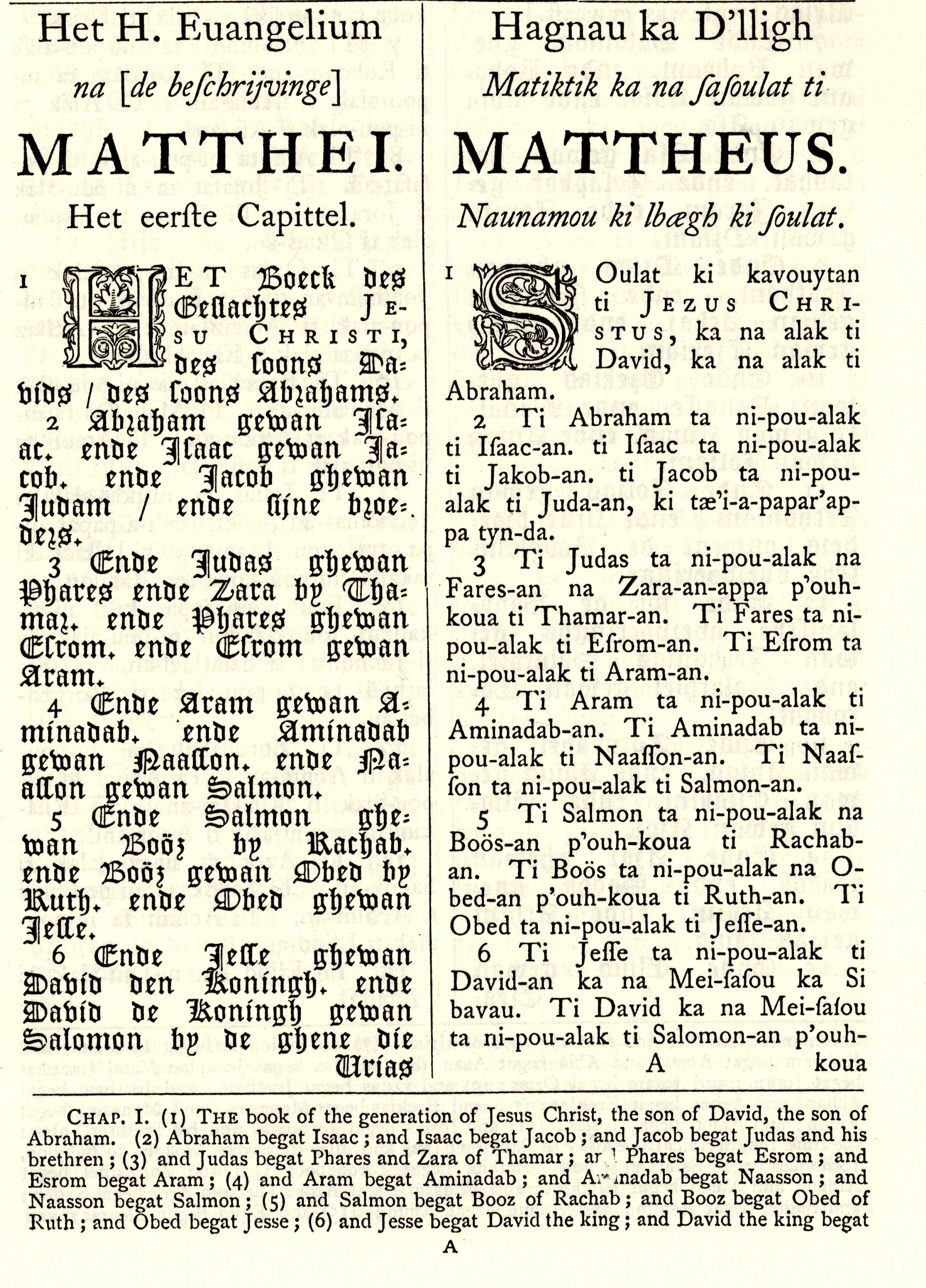
The opening paragraphs of the Gospel of Matthew in bilingual parallel format, from the first half of the 17th century, in the Dutch and Sinckan languages. (Campbell & Gravius (1888). The Gospel of St. Matthew in Formosan)

During the European period (1623–1662), soldiers and traders representing the Dutch East India Company maintained a colony in southwestern Taiwan (1624–1662) near present-day Tainan. This established an Asian base for triangular trade between the company, the Qing dynasty and Japan, with the hope of interrupting Portuguese and Spanish trading alliances with China. The Spanish also established a small colony in northern Taiwan (1626–1642) in present-day Keelung. However, Spanish influence wavered almost from the beginning, so that by the late 1630s they had already withdrawn most of their troops. After they were driven out of Taiwan by a combined Dutch and indigenous force in 1642, the Spanish "had little effect on Taiwan's history". Dutch influence was far more significant: expanding to the southwest and north of the island, they set up a tax system and established schools and churches in many villages.

When the Dutch arrived in 1624 at Tayouan (Anping) Harbor, Siraya-speaking representatives from nearby Saccam village soon appeared at the Dutch stockade to barter and trade; an overture which was readily welcomed by the Dutch. The Sirayan villages were, however, divided into warring factions: the village of Sinckan (Sinshih) was at war with Mattau (Madou) and its ally Baccluan, while the village of Soulang maintained uneasy neutrality. In 1629 a Dutch expeditionary force searching for Han pirates was massacred by warriors from Mattau, and the victory inspired other villages to rebel. In 1635, with reinforcements having arrived from Batavia (now Jakarta, Indonesia), the Dutch subjugated and burned Mattau. Since Mattau was the most powerful village in the area, the victory brought a spate of peace offerings from other nearby villages, many of which were outside the Siraya area. This was the beginning of Dutch consolidation over large parts of Taiwan, which brought an end to centuries of inter-village warfare. The new period of peace allowed the Dutch to construct schools and churches aimed at acculturating and converting the indigenous population. Dutch schools taught a romanized script (Sinckan writing), which transcribed the Siraya language. This script maintained occasional use through the 18th century. Today only fragments survive, in documents and stone stele markers. The schools also served to maintain alliances and open indigenous areas for Dutch enterprise and commerce.

The Dutch soon found trade in deerskins and venison in the East Asian market to be a lucrative endeavor and recruited plains indigenous peoples to procure the hides. The deer trade attracted the first Han traders to indigenous villages, but as early as 1642 the demand for deer greatly diminished the deer stocks. This drop significantly reduced the prosperity of indigenous peoples, forcing many indigenous to take up farming to counter the economic impact of losing their most vital food source.

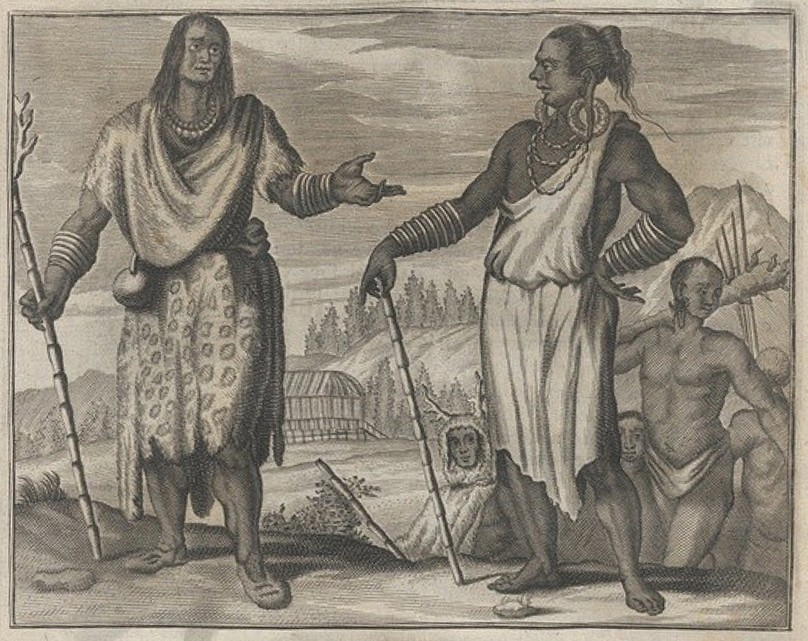
Taiwanese indigenous people depicted in Olfert Dapper (1670): Gedenkwaerdig bedryf

As the Dutch began subjugating indigenous villages in the south and west of Taiwan, increasing numbers of Han immigrants looked to exploit areas that were fertile and rich in game. The Dutch initially encouraged this, since the Han were skilled in agriculture and large-scale hunting. Several Han took up residence in Siraya villages. The Dutch used Han agents to collect taxes, hunting license fees and other income. This set up a society in which "many of the colonists were Han Chinese but the military and the administrative structures were Dutch". Despite this, local alliances transcended ethnicity during the Dutch period. For example, the Guo Huaiyi Rebellion in 1652, a Han farmers' uprising, was defeated by an alliance of 120 Dutch musketeers with the aid of Han loyalists and 600 indigenous warriors.

Multiple indigenous villages in frontier areas rebelled against the Dutch in the 1650s due to oppression, such as when the Dutch ordered indigenous women for sex, deer pelts, and rice be given to them from the indigenous in the Taipei Basin in Wu-lao-wan village, which sparked a rebellion in December 1652 at the same time as the Chinese rebellion. Two Dutch translators were beheaded by the Wu-lao-wan indigenous people and in a subsequent fight, 30 indigenous people and another two Dutch people died. After an embargo of salt and iron on Wu-lao-wan, the indigenous people were forced to sue for peace in February 1653.

The Dutch period ended in 1662 when Ming loyalist forces of Zheng Chenggong (Koxinga) drove out the Dutch and established the short-lived Zheng family kingdom on Taiwan. Dutch colonialism left different impressions on different indigenous groups in Taiwan. The Koaluts (Guizaijiao) tribe of the Paiwan people attacked American survivors of a shipwreck during the Rover incident in 1867. The chief, Tanketok, explained that this was because in ages past, the white men came and almost exterminated their tribe, and their ancestors passed down their desire for revenge. According to William A. Pickering in his Pioneering in Formosa (1898), the old people of Kong-a-na, about 15 miles from Sin-kang, loved white men and the old women there said they were their kindred.

=== Kingdom of Tungning (1661–1683) ===
The Kingdom of Tungning was established by Zheng Chenggong (Koxinga) after arriving in Taiwan in 1661 and ousting the Dutch in 1662. The Taiwanese indigenous tribes, who were previously allied with the Dutch against the Chinese during the Guo Huaiyi rebellion in 1652, turned against the Dutch during the Siege of Fort Zeelandia and defected to Koxinga's Chinese forces. The indigenous of Sincan defected to Koxinga after he offered them amnesty. The Sincan indigenous people then proceeded to work for the Chinese and behead Dutch people in executions. The frontier indigenous in the mountains and plains also surrendered and defected to the Chinese on 17 May 1661, celebrating their freedom from compulsory education under the Dutch rule by hunting down Dutch people, beheading them and trashing their Christian school textbooks.

Koxinga's son and successor, Zheng Jing, dispatched teachers to indigenous tribes to provide them with supplies and teach them more advanced farming techniques. He also gave them Ming gowns and caps while eating with their chiefs and gifting tobacco to indigenous people who were gathered in crowds to meet and welcome him as he visited their villages after he defeated the Dutch. Schools were set up to teach the indigenous people the Chinese language, writing, and the Confucian Classics. Those who refused were punished.

Zhengs brought 70,000 soldiers to Taiwan and immediately began clearing large tracts of land to support their forces. The expansion of Chinese settlements often came at the expense of indigenous tribes, causing rebellions to flare up over the course of Zheng rule. In one campaign, several hundred Shalu tribes people in modern Taichung were killed. By the start of 1684, a year after the end of Zheng rule, areas under cultivation in Taiwan had tripled in size since the end of the Dutch era in 1660.

=== Qing dynasty rule (1683–1895) ===
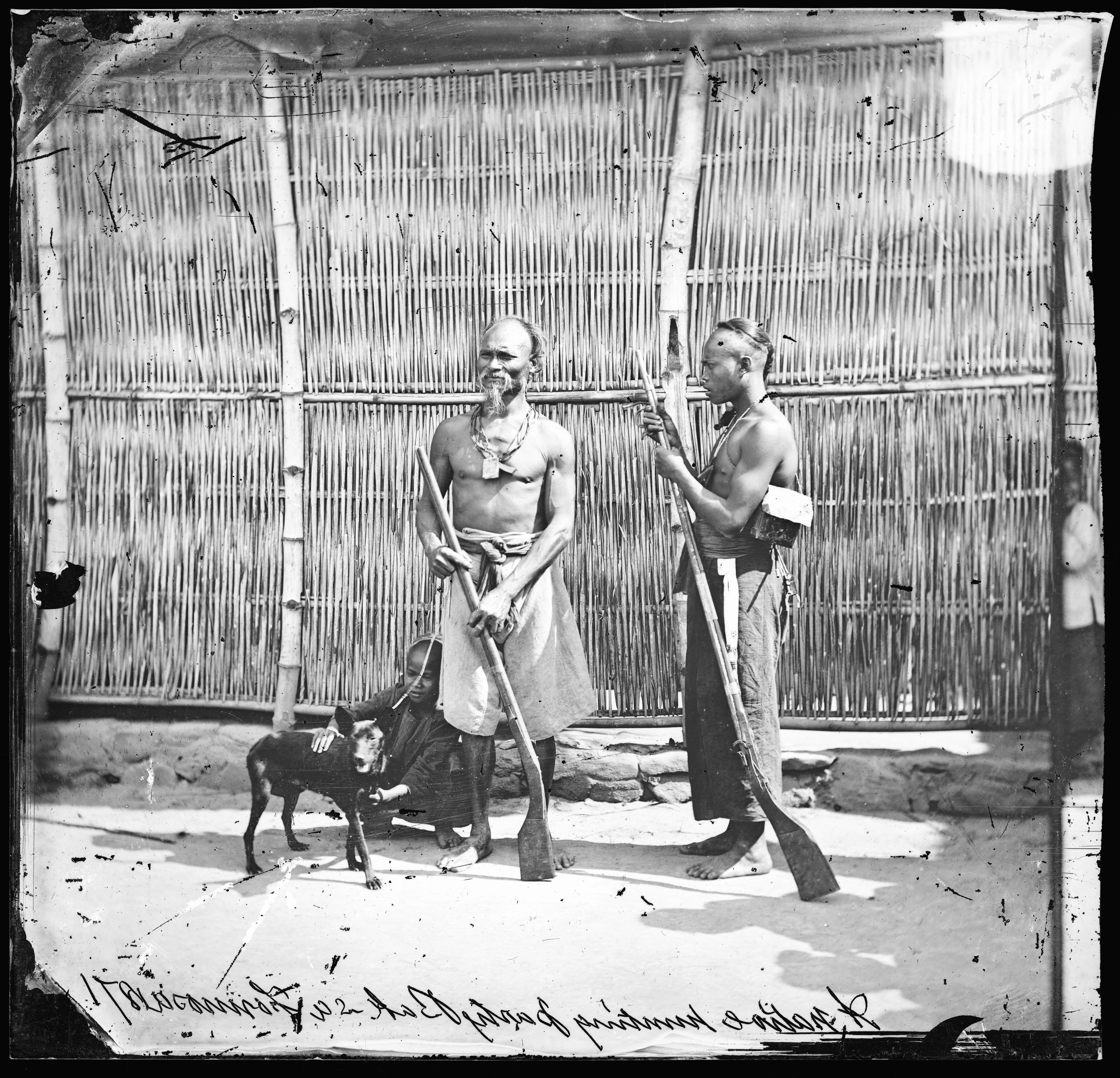
A photograph of a plain indigenous people hunting party with their Formosan Mountain Dog in Ba̍k-sa (木柵, as part of Neimen District in Kaohsiung nowadays), by John Thomson, 1871: "A Native Hunting Party Baksa Formosa 1871".

==== Quarantine policies ====
After the Qing dynasty government defeated the Ming loyalist forces maintained by the Zheng family in 1683, Taiwan became increasingly integrated into the Qing dynasty. Qing forces ruled areas of Taiwan's highly populated western plain for over two centuries, until 1895. This era was characterized by a marked increase in the number of Han Chinese on Taiwan, continued social unrest, the piecemeal transfer (by various means) of large amounts of land from the indigenous to the Han, and the nearly complete acculturation of the Western Plains indigenous people to Chinese Han customs.

During the Qing dynasty's two-century rule over Taiwan, the population of Han on the island increased dramatically. However, it is not clear to what extent this was due to an influx of Han settlers, who were predominantly displaced young men from Zhangzhou and Quanzhou in Fujian province. The Qing government officially sanctioned and controlled Han settlement, but sought to manage tensions between the various regional and ethnic groups. Therefore, it often recognized the plains peoples' claims to deer fields and traditional territory. The Qing authorities hoped to turn the Plains peoples into loyal subjects, and adopted the head and corvée taxes on the indigenous, which made the plains indigenous people directly responsible for payment to the government yamen. The attention paid by the Qing authorities to indigenous land rights was part of a larger administrative goal to maintain a level of peace on the turbulent Taiwan frontier, which was often marred by ethnic and regional conflict. The frequency of rebellions, riots, and civil strife in Qing dynasty Taiwan is often encapsulated in the saying "every three years an uprising; every five years a rebellion".

In 1723, indigenous people living in Dajiaxi village along the central coastal plain rebelled. Government troops from southern Taiwan were sent to put down this revolt, but in their absence, Han settlers in Fengshan County rose up in revolt under the leadership of Wu Fusheng, a settler from Zhangzhou. Indigenous participation in major revolts during the Qing era, including the Taokas-led Ta-Chia-hsi revolt of 1731–1732, ensured the Plains peoples would remain an important factor in crafting Qing frontier policy until the end of Qing rule in 1895. By 1732, five different ethnic groups were in revolt but the rebellion was defeated by the end of the year.

The struggle over land resources was one source of conflict. Large areas of the western plain were subject to large land rents called Huan Da Zu (番大租—literally, "Barbarian Big Rent"), a category which remained until the period of Japanese colonization. The large tracts of deer field, guaranteed by the Qing, were owned by the communities and their individual members. The communities would commonly offer Han farmers a permanent patent for use, while maintaining ownership (skeleton) of the subsoil (田骨), which was called "two lords to a field" (一田兩主). The Plains peoples were often cheated out of land or pressured to sell at unfavorable rates. Some disaffected subgroups moved to central or eastern Taiwan, but most remained in their ancestral locations and acculturated or assimilated into Han society. Despite this, the vast majority of rebellions did not originate from indigenous peoples but the Han settlers, and the mountain indigenous were left to their own devices until the last 20 years of Qing rule. During the Qianlong period (1735–1796), the 93 shufan acculturated indigenous villages never rebelled and over 200 non-acculturated indigenous villages submitted.

During the reigns of the Kangxi (r. 1661–1722), Yongzheng (r. 1722–1735), and Qianlong (r. 1735–1796) emperors, the Qing court deliberately restricted the expansion of territory and government administration in Taiwan. A government permit was required for settlers to go beyond the Dajia River at the mid-point of the western plains. In 1715, the governor-general of Fujian-Zhejiang recommended land reclamation in Taiwan but Kangxi was worried that this would cause instability and conflicts. By the time of Yongzheng's reign, the Qing extended control over the entire western plains, but this was to better control the settlers and maintain security. The quarantine policies were maintained. After the Zhu Yigui uprising, which occurred in 1721, Lan Dingyuan, an advisor to Lan Tingzhen, who led forces against the rebellion, advocated for expansion and land reclamation to strengthen government control over the Chinese settlers. He wanted to convert the indigenous to Han culture and turn them into subjects of the Qing. However, the Qianlong Emperor kept the administrative structure of Taiwan largely unchanged and in 1744, he dismissed recommendations by officials to allow settlers to claim land.

==== Qing classification of indigenous peoples ====
The Qing did little to administer the indigenous and rarely tried to subjugate or impose cultural change upon them. Indigenous peoples were classified into two general categories: acculturated indigenous (shufan) and non-acculturated indigenous (shengfan). Sheng is a word used to describe uncooked food, unworked land, unripe fruit, unskilled labor or strangers, while shu bears the opposite meaning. To the Qing, shufan were indigenous people who paid taxes, performed corvée, and had adopted Han Chinese culture to some degree. When the Qing annexed Taiwan, there were 46 indigenous villages under government control: 12 in Fengshan and 34 in Zhuluo. These were likely inherited from the Zheng regime. In the Yongzheng period, 108 indigenous villages submitted as a result of encouragement and enticement from the Taiwan regional commander, Lin Liang. Shengfan who paid taxes but did not perform corvée and did not practice Han Chinese culture were called guihua shengfan (submitted non-acculturated indigenous).

The Qianlong administration forbade enticing the indigenous to submit due to fear of conflict. In the early Qianlong period, there were 299 named indigenous villages. Records show 93 shufan villages and 61 guihua shengfan villages. The number of shufan villages remained stable throughout the Qianlong period. Two indigenous affairs sub-prefects were appointed to manage indigenous affairs in 1766. One was in charge of the north and the other in charge of the south, both focused on the plains indigenous. Boundaries were built to keep the mountain indigenous people out of settlement areas. The policy of marking settler boundaries and segregating them from indigenous territories became official policy in 1722 in response to the Zhu Yigui uprising. Fifty-four stelae were used to mark crucial points along the settler-indigenous boundary. Han settlers were forbidden from crossing into indigenous territory, but settler encroachment continued, and the boundaries were rebuilt in 1750, 1760, 1784, and 1790. Settlers were forbidden from marrying indigenous people as marriage was one way settlers obtained land. While the settlers drove colonization and acculturation, the Qing policy of quarantine diminished the impact on indigenous people, especially mountain indigenous people.

==== Settler expansion ====
Although Qing quarantine policies were maintained in the early 19th century, attitudes towards indigenous territories started to shift. Local officials repeatedly advocated for the colonization of indigenous territories, especially in the cases of Gamalan and Shuishalian. The Gamalan or Kavalan people were situated in modern Yilan County in northeastern Taiwan. It was separated from the western plains and Tamsui (Danshui) by mountains. There were 36 indigenous villages in the area and the Kavalan people had started paying taxes as early as the Kangxi period (r. 1661–1722), but they were non-acculturated guihua shengfan indigenous.

In 1787, a Chinese settler named Wu Sha tried to reclaim land in Gamalan but was defeated by indigenous people. The next year, the Tamsui sub-prefect convinced the Taiwan prefect, Yang Tingli, to support Wu Sha. Yang recommended subjugating the natives and opening Gamalan for settlement to the Fujian governor, but the governor refused to act due to fear of conflict. In 1797, a new Tamsui sub-prefect issued a permit and financial support for Wu to recruit settlers for land reclamation, which was illegal. Wu's successors were unable to register the reclaimed land on government registers. Local officials supported land reclamation but could not officially recognize it.

In 1806, it was reported that a pirate, Cai Qian, was within the vicinity of Gamalan. Taiwan Prefect Yang once again recommended opening up Gamalan, arguing that to abandon it would cause trouble on the frontier. Later, another pirate band tried to occupy Gamalan. Yang recommended to the Fuzhou General Saichong'a the establishment of administration and land surveys in Gamalan. Saichong'a initially refused but then changed his mind and sent a memorial to the emperor in 1808 recommending the incorporation of Gamalan. The issue was discussed by the central government officials and for the first time, one official went on record saying that if indigenous territory was incorporated, not only would it end the pirate threat, but the government would stand to profit from the land itself. In 1809, the emperor ordered Gamalan to be incorporated. The next year, an imperial decree for the formal incorporation of Gamalan was issued and a Gamalan sub-prefect was appointed.

Unlike Gamalan, debates on Shuishalian resulted in its continued status as a closed-off area. Shuishalian refers to the upstream areas of the Zhuoshui River and Wu River in central Taiwan. The inner mountain area of Shuishalian was inhabited by 24 indigenous villages and six of them occupied the flat and fertile basin area. The indigenous had submitted as early as 1693, but they remained non-acculturated. In 1814, some settlers were able to obtain reclamation permits through fabricating indigenous land lease requests. In 1816, the government sent troops to evict the settlers and destroy their strongholds. Stelae were erected demarcating the land forbidden to Chinese settlers.

Local officials advocated for supporting colonization efforts into the mid-1800s but their recommendations were ignored.

==== Migration to highlands ====
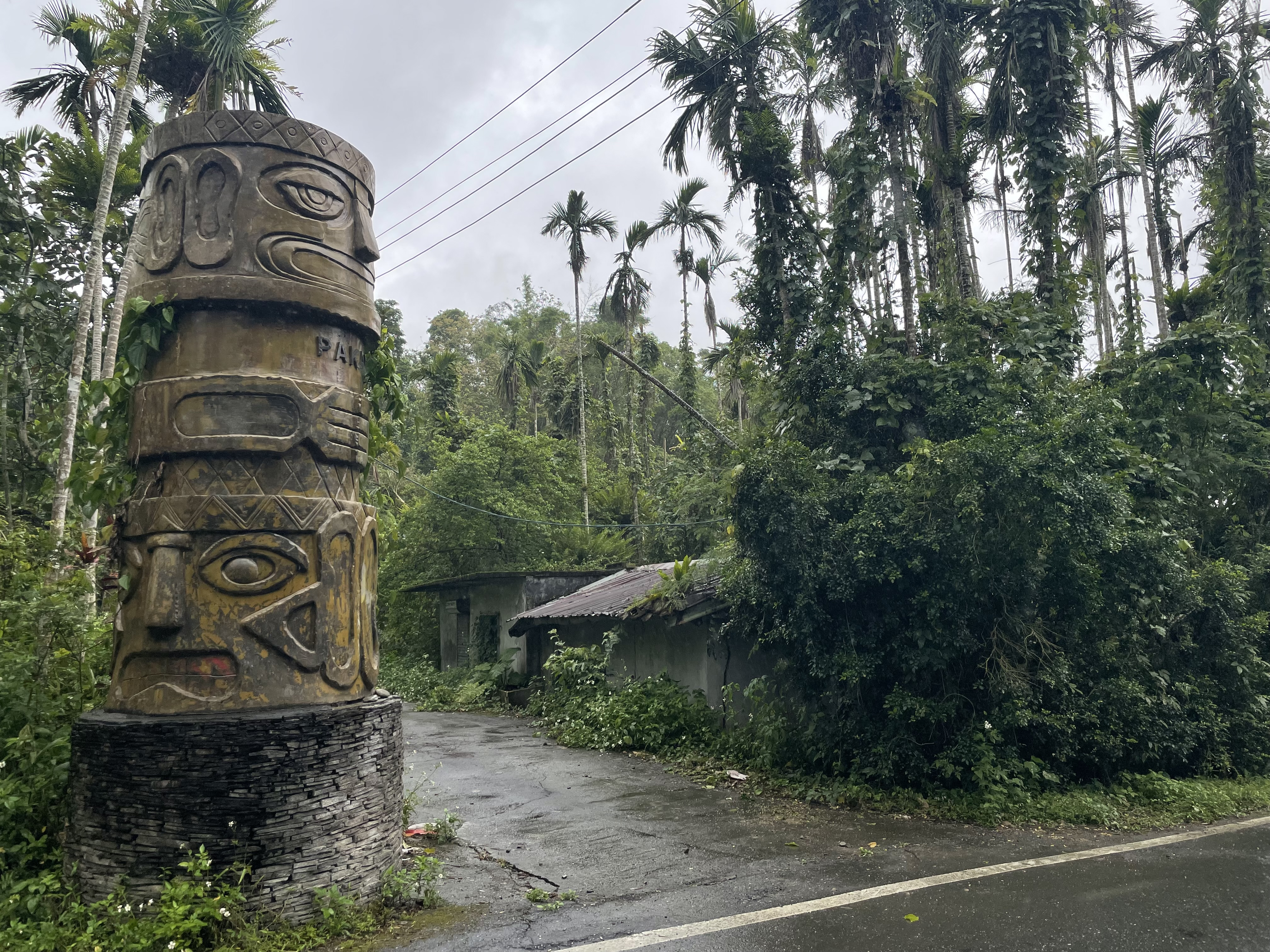
Indigenous sculpture in the Hai'an range of Hualien County.

One popular narrative holds that all of the Gaoshan peoples were originally Plains peoples, who fled to the mountains under pressure from Han encroachment. This strong version of the "migration" theory has been largely discounted by contemporary research as the Gaoshan people demonstrate a physiology, material cultures and customs that have been adapted for life at higher elevations. Linguistic, archeological, and recorded anecdotal evidence also suggest that there has been an island-wide migration of indigenous peoples for over 3,000 years.

Small sub-groups of Plains Indigenous Peoples may have occasionally fled to the mountains, foothills or eastern plain to escape hostile groups of Han or other indigenous. The "displacement scenario" is more likely rooted in the older customs of many Plains groups to withdraw into the foothills during headhunting season or when threatened by a neighboring village, as observed by the Dutch during their punitive campaign of Mattou in 1636 when the bulk of the village retreated to Tevorangh. The "displacement scenario" may also stem from the inland migrations of Plains indigenous subgroups, who were displaced by either Han or other Plains indigenous and chose to move to the Iilan plain in 1804, the Puli basin in 1823 and another Puli migration in 1875. Each migration consisted of a number of families and totaled hundreds of people, not entire communities. There are also recorded oral histories that recall some Plains indigenous people were sometimes captured and killed by Highlands peoples while relocating through the mountains. However, as Shepherd (1993) explained in detail, documented evidence shows that the majority of Plains people remained on the plains, intermarried Hakka and Hoklo immigrants from Fujian and Guangdong, and adopted a Han identity.

==== Colonization in reaction to crises ====
In 1874, Japan invaded indigenous territory in southern Taiwan in what is known as the Mudan Incident (Japanese invasion of Taiwan (1874)). For six months, Japanese soldiers occupied southern Taiwan and Japan argued that it was not part of the Qing dynasty. The result was the payment of an indemnity by the Qing in return for the Japanese army's withdrawal.

The imperial commissioner for Taiwan, Shen Baozhen, argued that "the reason that Taiwan is being coveted by [Japan] is that the land is too empty." He recommended subjugating the indigenous and populating their territory with Chinese settlers. As a result, the administration of Taiwan was expanded and campaigns against the indigenous people were launched. The two sub-prefects responsible for indigenous affairs were moved to inner Shushalian (Puli) and eastern Taiwan (Beinan), the focal points for colonization. Starting in 1874, mountain roads were built to make the region more accessible and indigenous people were brought into formal submission to the Qing. In 1875, the ban on entering Taiwan was lifted. In 1877, 21 guidelines on subjugating indigenous peoples and opening the mountains were issued. Agencies for recruiting settlers were established on the coastal mainland and in Hong Kong. However, efforts to promote settlement in Taiwan petered out soon after.

Efforts to settle in indigenous territories were renewed under the governance of Liu Mingchuan after the Sino-French War ended in 1885. However few settlers went to Taiwan and those that did were accosted by indigenous and the harsh climate. Governor Liu was criticized for the high cost and little gain from the colonization activities. Liu resigned in 1891 and the colonization efforts ceased.

A Taiwan Pacification and Reclamation Head Office was established with eight pacification and reclamation bureaus. Four bureaus were located in eastern Taiwan, two in Puli (inner Shuishalian), one in the north, and one on the western border of the mountains. By 1887, about 500 indigenous villages, or roughly 90,000 indigenous people had formally submitted to Qing rule. This number increased to 800 villages with 148,479 indigenous over the following years. However, the cost of getting them to submit was exorbitant. The Qing offered them materials and paid village chiefs monthly allowances. Not all the indigenous people were under effective control and land reclamation in eastern Taiwan occurred at a slow pace. From 1884 to 1891, Liu launched more than 40 military campaigns against the indigenous with 17,500 soldiers. A third of the invasion force was killed or disabled in the conflict, amounting to a costly failure.

By the end of the Qing period, the western plains were fully developed as farmland with about 2.5 million Chinese settlers. The mountainous areas were still largely autonomous under the control of indigenous. Indigenous land loss under the Qing occurred at a relatively slow pace compared to the following Japanese colonial period due to the absence of state sponsored land deprivation for the majority of Qing rule. In the 50-year period of Japanese rule that followed, the Taiwanese indigenous lost their right to legal ownership of land and were confined to small reserves one-eighth the size of their ancestral lands. However, even if Japan had not taken over Taiwan, the plains indigenous were on the way to losing their residual rights to land. By the last years of Qing rule, most of the plains indigenous had been acculturated to Han culture, around 20–30% could speak their mother tongues, and they gradually lost their land ownership and rent collection rights.

=== Highland peoples ===
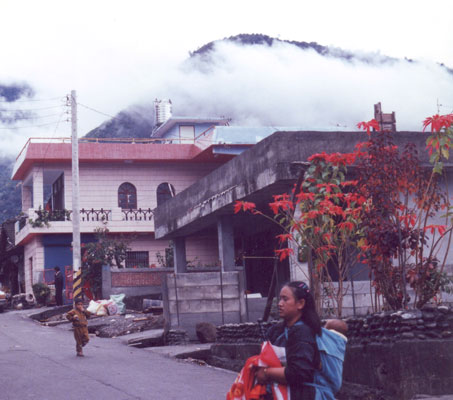
Bunun mother and child in sling in Lona Village, Nantou County, Taiwan

Imperial Chinese and European societies had little contact with the Highland indigenous until expeditions to the region by European and American explorers and missionaries commenced in the 19th and early 20th centuries. The lack of data before this was primarily the result of a Qing quarantine on the region to the east of the "earth oxen" (土牛) border, which ran along the eastern edge of the western plain. Han contact with the mountain peoples was usually associated with the enterprise of gathering and extracting camphor from camphor laurel trees (Cinnamomum camphora), native to the island and in particular the mountainous areas. The production and shipment of camphor (used in herbal medicines and mothballs) was then a significant industry on the island, lasting up to and including the period of Japanese rule. These early encounters often involved headhunting parties from the Highland peoples, who sought out and raided unprotected Han forest workers. Together with traditional Han concepts of Taiwanese behavior, these raiding incidents helped to promote the Qing-era popular image of the "violent" indigenous.

Taiwanese Plains indigenous were often employed and dispatched as interpreters to assist in the trade of goods between Han merchants and the Highlands indigenous. The indigenous people traded cloth, pelts and meat for iron and matchlock rifles. Iron was a necessary material for the fabrication of hunting knives—long, curved sabers that were generally used as a forest tool. These blades became notorious among Han settlers, given their alternative use to decapitate Highland indigenous enemies in customary headhunting expeditions.

==== Headhunting ====
Every tribe except the Tao people of Orchid Island practiced headhunting, which was a symbol of bravery and valor. Men who did not take heads could not cross the rainbow bridge into the spirit world upon death as per the religion of Gaya. Each tribe has its own origin story for the tradition of headhunting but the theme is similar across tribes. After the great flood, headhunting originated due to boredom (South Tsou Sa'arua, Paiwan), to improve tribal singing (Alishan Tsou), as a form of population control (Atayal, Taroko, Bunun), simply for amusement and fun (Rukai, Tsou, Puyuma) or particularly for the fun and excitement of killing intellectually disabled individuals (Amis).

Once the victims had been decapitated and displayed, the heads were boiled and left to dry, often hanging from trees or displayed on slate shelves referred to as "skull racks". A party returning with a head was cause for celebration, as it was believed to bring good luck and the spiritual power of the slaughtered individual was believed to transfer into the headhunter. If the head was that of a woman, it was even better because it meant she could not bear children. The Bunun people would often take prisoners and inscribe prayers or messages to their dead on arrows, then shoot their prisoners with the hope that their prayers would be carried to the dead.

Taiwanese Hoklo Han settlers and Japanese were often the victims of headhunting raids as they were considered by the indigenous to be liars and enemies. A headhunting raid would often strike at workers in the fields, or set a dwelling alight and then decapitate the inhabitants as they fled the burning structure. It was also customary to later raise the victim's surviving children as full members of the community. Often, the heads themselves were ceremonially "invited" to join the community as members, where they were supposed to watch over the community and keep it safe. The indigenous inhabitants of Taiwan accepted the convention and practice of headhunting as one of the calculated risks of community life.

The last groups to practise headhunting were the Paiwan, Bunun, and Atayal groups. Japanese rule ended the practice by 1930, (though Japanese were not subject to this regulation and continued to headhunt their enemies throughout World War II) and as late as 2003 there are elder Taiwanese that could recall the practice firsthand.

=== Japanese rule (1895–1945) ===
When the Treaty of Shimonoseki was finalized on 17 April 1895, Taiwan was ceded by the Qing Empire to Japan. Taiwan's incorporation into the Japanese political orbit brought the Taiwanese indigenous people into contact with a new colonial structure, determined to define and locate indigenous people within the framework of a new, multi-ethnic empire. The means of accomplishing this goal took three main forms: anthropological study of the natives of Taiwan, attempts to reshape the indigenous in the mold of the Japanese, and military suppression. The indigenous and Han joined to violently revolt against Japanese rule in the 1907 Beipu uprising and 1915 Tapani incident.

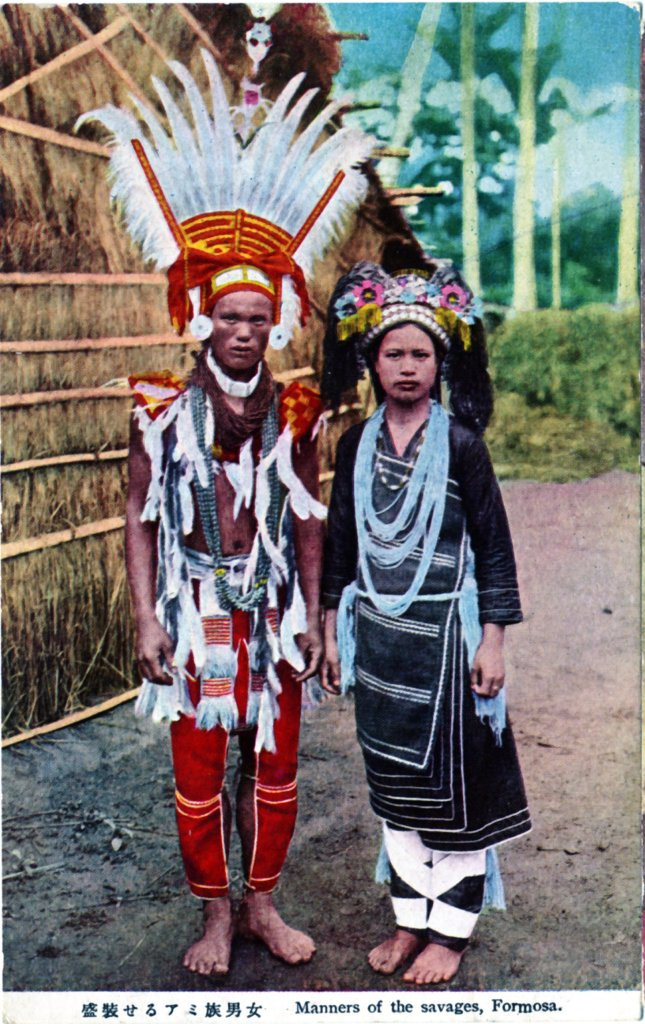
Colorized photograph of an Amis couple in traditional clothing. Taken in pre-World War II Japanese-ruled Taiwan.

Japan's sentiment regarding indigenous peoples was crafted around the memory of the Mudan incident, when, in 1871, a group of 54 shipwrecked Ryūkyūan sailors was massacred by a Paiwan group from the village of Mudan in southern Taiwan. The resulting Japanese policy, published 20 years before the onset of their rule on Taiwan, cast Taiwanese indigenous as "vicious, violent and cruel" and concluded "this is a pitfall of the world; we must get rid of them all". Japanese campaigns to gain indigenous submission were often brutal, as evidenced in the desire of Japan's first Governor General, Kabayama Sukenori, to "conquer the barbarians" (Kleeman 2003:20). The Seediq indigenous fought against the Japanese in multiple battles such as the Xincheng incident (新城事件), Truku battle (太魯閣之役) (Taroko), 1902 Renzhiguan incident (人止關事件), and the 1903 Zimeiyuan incident (姊妹原事件). In the Musha Incident of 1930, for example, a Seediq group was decimated by artillery and supplanted by the Taroko (Truku), which had sustained periods of bombardment from naval ships and airplanes dropping mustard gas. A quarantine was placed around the mountain areas, enforced by armed guard stations and electrified fences, until the most remote high mountain villages could be relocated closer to administrative control.

A divide and rule policy was formulated with Japan trying to play indigenous and Han against each other to their own benefit when Japan alternated between fighting the two with Japan first fighting Han and then fighting indigenous. Nationalist Japanese claim indigenous were treated well by Kabayama. Unenlightened and stubbornly stupid were the words used to describe indigenous by Kabayama Sukenori. A hardline anti indigenous position aimed at the destruction of their civilization was implemented by Fukuzawa Yukichi. The most tenacioius opposition was mounted by the Bunan and Atayal against the Japanese during the brutal mountain war in 1913–14 under Sakuma. Indigenous continued to fight against the Japanese after 1915. Indigenous were subjected to military takeover and assimilation. In order to exploit camphor resources, the Japanese fought against the Bngciq Atayal in 1906 and expelled them. The war is called the "Camphor War" (樟腦戰爭).

The Bunun people under Chief Raho Ari (or Dahu Ali, 拉荷·阿雷, lāhè āléi) engaged in guerrilla warfare against the Japanese for twenty years. Raho Ari's revolt was sparked when the Japanese implemented a gun control policy in 1914 against the indigenous people, in which their rifles were impounded in police stations when hunting expeditions were over. The Dafen incident w:zh:大分事件 began at Dafen when a police platoon was slaughtered by Raho Ari's clan in 1915. A settlement holding 266 people called Tamaho was created by Raho Ari and his followers near the source of the Laonong River and attracted more Bunun rebels to their cause. Raho Ari and his followers captured bullets and guns and slew Japanese in repeated hit and run raids against Japanese police stations by infiltrating over the Japanese "guardline" of electrified fences and police stations as they pleased.

The 1930 "New Flora and Silva, Volume 2" said of the mountain indigenous that the "majority of them live in a state of war against Japanese authority". The Bunun and Atayal were described as the "most ferocious" indigenous people, and police stations were targeted by indigenous people in intermittent assaults. By January 1915, all indigenous peoples in northern Taiwan were forced to hand over their guns to the Japanese, and headhunting and assaults on police stations by indigenous still continued after that year. Between 1921 and 1929, indigenous raids died down, but a major revival and surge in indigenous armed resistance erupted from 1930 to 1933 for four years during which the Musha Incident occurred and Bunun carried out raids, after which armed conflict again died down. According to a 1933 book, wounded people in the Japanese war against the indigenous numbered around 4,160, with 4,422 civilians dead and 2,660 military personnel killed. According to a 1935 report, 7,081 Japanese were killed in the armed struggle from 1896 to 1933 while the Japanese confiscated 29,772 indigenous people's guns by 1933.

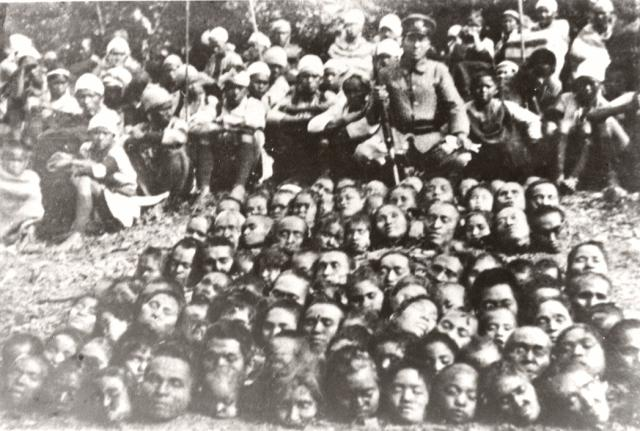
Seediq indigenous rebels and children beheaded by Japanese indigenous allies, in 1931 during the Musha Incident

Beginning in the first year of Japanese rule, the colonial government embarked on a mission to study the indigenous so they could be classified, located and "civilized". The Japanese "civilizing project", partially fueled by public demand in Japan to know more about the empire, would be used to benefit the Imperial government by consolidating administrative control over the entire island, opening up vast tracts of land for exploitation. To satisfy these needs, "the Japanese portrayed and catalogued Taiwan's indigenous peoples in a welter of statistical tables, magazine and newspaper articles, photograph albums for popular consumption". The Japanese-based much of their information and terminology on prior Qing era narratives concerning degrees of "civilization".

Japanese ethnographer Ino Kanori was charged with the task of surveying the entire population of Taiwanese indigenous, applying the first systematic study of the indigenous on Taiwan. Ino's research is best known for his formalization of eight peoples of Taiwanese indigenous: Atayal, Bunun, Saisiat, Tsou, Paiwan, Puyuma, Ami and Pepo (Pingpu). This is the direct antecedent of the taxonomy used today to distinguish people groups that are officially recognized by the government.

Life under the Japanese changed rapidly as many of the traditional structures were replaced by a military power. Indigenous people who wished to improve their status looked to education rather than headhunting as the new form of power. Those who learned to work with the Japanese and follow their customs would be better suited to lead villages. The Japanese encouraged indigenous to maintain traditional costumes and selected customs that were not considered detrimental to society, but invested much time and money in efforts to eliminate traditions deemed unsavory by Japanese culture, including tattooing. By the mid-1930s, as Japan's empire was reaching its zenith, the colonial government began a political socialization program designed to enforce Japanese customs, rituals and a loyal Japanese identity upon the indigenous. By the end of World War II, indigenous people whose fathers had been killed in pacification campaigns were volunteering to serve in Special Units and, if need be, die for the Emperor of Japan. The Japanese colonial experience left an indelible mark on many older indigenous people who maintained an admiration for the Japanese long after their departure in 1945.

The Japanese troops used indigenous women as sex slaves, so called "comfort women".

=== Kuomintang single-party rule (1945–1987) ===
Japanese rule of Taiwan ended in 1945, following the armistice with the allies on 2 September and the subsequent appropriation of the island by the Chinese Nationalist Party (Kuomintang, or KMT) on 25 October. In 1949, on losing the Chinese Civil War to the Chinese Communist Party, Generalissimo Chiang Kai-shek led the Kuomintang in a retreat from mainland China, withdrawing its government and 1.3 million refugees to Taiwan. The KMT installed an authoritarian form of government and shortly thereafter inaugurated a number of political socialization programs aimed at nationalizing Taiwanese people as citizens of a Chinese nation and eradicating Japanese influence.

The KMT pursued highly centralized political and cultural policies rooted in the party's decades-long history of fighting warlordism in China and opposing competing concepts of a loose federation following the demise of the imperial Qing. The project was designed to create a strong national Chinese cultural identity (as defined by the state) at the expense of local cultures. Following the February 28 Incident in 1947, the Kuomintang placed Taiwan under martial law, which was to last for nearly four decades.

Taiwanese indigenous peoples first encountered the Nationalist government in 1946, when the Japanese village schools were replaced by schools of the KMT. Documents from the Education Office show an emphasis on Chinese language, history and citizenship—with a curriculum steeped in pro-KMT ideology. Some elements of the curriculum, such as the Wu Feng Legend, are currently considered offensive to the Taiwanese indigenous peoples. Much of the burden of educating the indigenous was undertaken by unqualified teachers, who could, at best, speak Mandarin and teach basic ideology. In 1951 a major political socialization campaign was launched to change the lifestyle of many indigenous, to adopt Han customs. A 1953 government report on mountain areas stated that its aims were chiefly to promote Mandarin to strengthen a national outlook and create good customs. This was included in the Shandi Pingdi Hua (山地平地化) policy to "make the mountains like the plains".

Critics of the KMT's program for a centralized national culture regard it as institutionalized ethnic discrimination, point to the loss of several indigenous languages and a perpetuation of shame for being an indigenous. Hsiau noted that Taiwan's first democratically elected president, Li Teng-Hui, said in a famous interview: "In the period of Japanese colonialism a Taiwanese would be punished by being forced to kneel out in the sun for speaking Tai-yü." [a dialect of Min Nan, which is not a Formosan language].

The pattern of intermarriage continued, as many KMT soldiers married indigenous women who were from poorer areas and could be easily bought as wives. Many contemporary Taiwanese are unwilling to entertain the idea of having an indigenous heritage. In a 1994 study, it was found that 71% of the families surveyed would object to their daughter marrying an indigenous man. For much of the KMT era the government definition of indigenous identity had been 100% indigenous parentage, leaving any intermarriage resulting in a non-indigenous child. Later, the policy was adjusted to the ethnic status of the father, determining the status of the child.

=== Transition to democracy ===
Authoritarian rule under the Kuomintang ended gradually through a transition to democracy, which was marked by the lifting of martial law in 1987. Soon after, the KMT transitioned to being merely one party within a democratic system, though maintaining a high degree of power in indigenous districts through an established system of patronage networks. The KMT continued to hold the reins of power for another decade under President Lee Teng-hui. However, they did so as an elected government rather than a dictatorial power. The elected KMT government supported many of the bills that had been promoted by indigenous groups. The tenth amendment to the Constitution of the Republic of China also stipulates that the government would protect and preserve indigenous culture and languages and also encourage them to participate in politics. "Constitution of the Republic of China (Taiwan) Additional Articles". Office of the President Republic of China (Taiwan).

During the period of political liberalization, which preceded the end of martial law, academic interest in the Plains indigenous surged as amateur and professional historians sought to rediscover Taiwan's past. The opposition tang wai activists seized upon the new image of the Plains indigenous as a means to directly challenge the KMT's official narrative of Taiwan as a historical part of China, and the government's assertion that Taiwanese were "pure" Han Chinese. Many tang wai activists framed the Plains indigenous experience in the existing anti-colonialism/victimization Taiwanese nationalist narrative, which positioned the Hoklo-speaking Taiwanese in the role of indigenous people and the victims of successive foreign rulers.

By the late 1980s, many Hoklo- and Hakka-speaking people began identifying themselves as Plains indigenous, though any initial shift in ethnic consciousness from Hakka or Hoklo people was minor. Despite the politicized dramatization of the Plains indigenous, their "rediscovery" as a matter of public discourse has had a lasting effect on the increased socio-political reconceptualization of Taiwan, emerging from a Han Chinese-dominant perspective into a wider acceptance of Taiwan as a multi-cultural and multi-ethnic community.

In many districts, Taiwanese indigenous tend to vote for the Kuomintang, to the point that the legislative seats allocated to the indigenous are popularly described as iron votes for the pan-blue coalition. This may seem surprising in light of the focus of the pan-green coalition on promoting indigenous culture as part of the Taiwanese nationalist discourse against the KMT. However, this voting pattern can be explained on economic grounds and as part of an inter-ethnic power struggle waged in the electorate. Some indigenous people see the rhetoric of Taiwan nationalism as favoring the majority Hoklo speakers rather than themselves. Indigenous areas also tend to be poor and their economic vitality tied to the entrenched patronage networks established by the Kuomintang over the course of its fifty-five year reign.

=== Democratic era ===
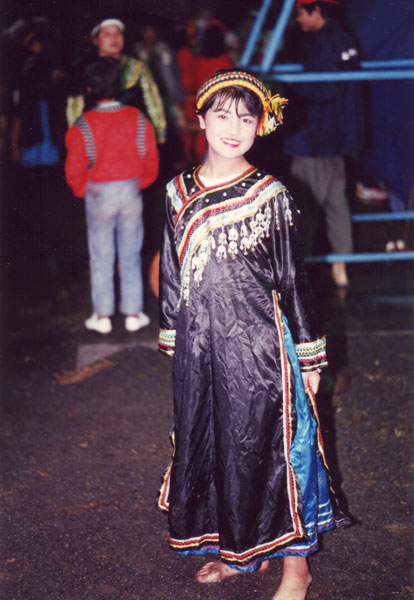
A Bunun dancer in Lona, Nantou County, Taiwan

The democratic era has been a time of great change, both constructive and destructive, for the indigenous people of Taiwan. Since the 1980s, increased political and public attention has been paid to the rights and social issues of the indigenous communities of Taiwan. Indigenous peoples have realized gains in both the political and economic spheres. Though progress is ongoing, there remain a number of still unrealized goals within the framework of the ROC: "although certainly more 'equal' than they were 20, or even 10, years ago, the indigenous inhabitants in Taiwan still remain on the lowest rungs of the legal and socioeconomic ladders". On the other hand, bright spots are not hard to find. A resurgence in ethnic pride has accompanied the indigenous cultural renaissance, which is exemplified by the increased popularity of indigenous music and greater public interest in indigenous culture.

==== Indigenous political movement ====
The movement for indigenous cultural and political resurgence in Taiwan traces its roots to the ideals outlined in the Universal Declaration of Human Rights (1948). Although the Republic of China was a UN member and signatory to the original UN Charter, four decades of martial law controlled the discourse of culture and politics on Taiwan. The political liberalization Taiwan experienced leading up to the official end of martial law on 15 July 1987, opened a new public arena for dissenting voices and political movements against the centralized policy of the KMT.

In December 1984, the Taiwan indigenous People's Movement was launched when a group of indigenous political activists, aided by the progressive Presbyterian Church in Taiwan (PCT), established the Alliance of Taiwan indigenous (ATA, or yuan chuan hui) to highlight the problems experienced by indigenous communities all over Taiwan, including: prostitution, economic disparity, land rights and official discrimination in the form of naming rights.

In 1988, amid the ATA's Return Our Land Movement, in which indigenous people demanded the return of lands to the original inhabitants, the ATA sent its first representative to the United Nations Working Group on Indigenous Populations. Following the success in addressing the UN, the "Return Our Land" movement evolved into the indigenous Constitution Movement, in which the indigenous representatives demanded appropriate wording in the ROC Constitution to ensure indigenous Taiwanese "dignity and justice" in the form of enhanced legal protection, government assistance to improve living standards in indigenous communities, and the right to identify themselves as "yuan chu min" (原住民), literally, "the people who lived here first," but more commonly, "indigenous". The KMT government initially opposed the term, due to its implication that other people on Taiwan, including the KMT government, were newcomers and not entitled to the island. The KMT preferred hsien chu min (先住民, "First people"), or tsao chu min (早住民, "Early People") to evoke a sense of general historical immigration to Taiwan.

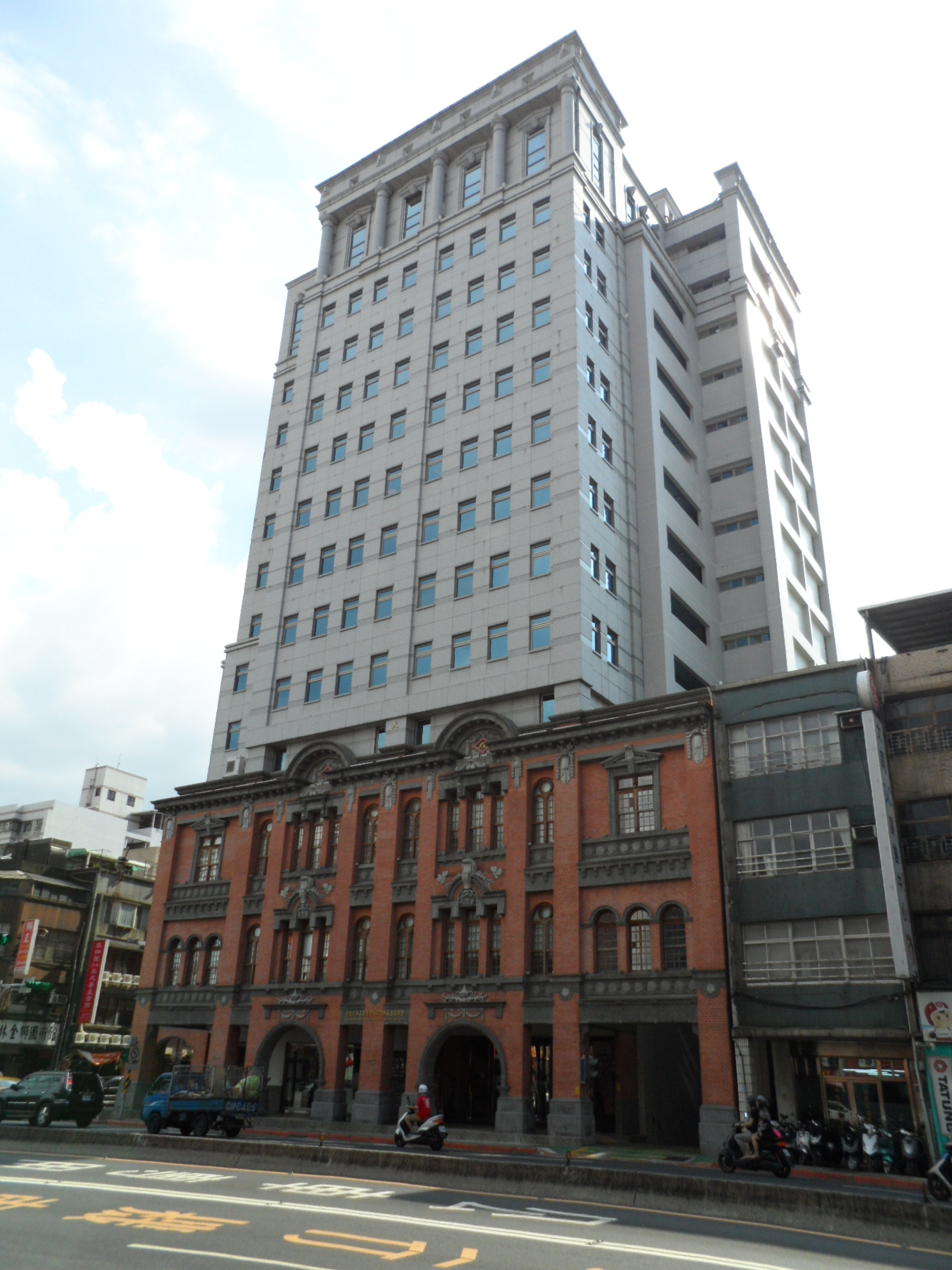
Council of Indigenous Peoples

To some degree, the movement has been successful. Beginning in 1998, the official curriculum in Taiwan schools has been changed to contain more frequent and favorable mention of indigenous peoples. In 1996, the Council of Indigenous Peoples was promoted to a ministry-level rank within the Executive Yuan. The central government has taken steps to allow romanized spellings of indigenous names on official documents, offsetting the long-held policy of forcing a Han name on an indigenous person. A relaxed policy on identification now allows a child to choose their official designation if they are born to mixed indigenous/Han parents.

The present political leaders in the indigenous community, led mostly by indigenous elites born after 1949, have been effective in leveraging their ethnic identity and socio-linguistic acculturation into contemporary Taiwanese society against the political backdrop of a changing Taiwan. This has allowed indigenous people a means to push for greater political space, including the still unrealized prospect of Indigenous People's Autonomous Areas within Taiwan.

In February 2017, the Indigenous Ketagalan Boulevard Protest started in a bid for more official recognition of land as traditional territories.

==== Political representation ====
Indigenous peoples were represented by eight members out of 225 seats in the Legislative Yuan. In 2008, the number of legislative seats was cut in half to 113, of which Taiwanese indigenous peoples are represented by six members, three each for lowland and highland peoples. The tendency of Taiwanese indigenous to vote for members of the pan-blue coalition has been cited as having the potential to change the balance of the legislature. Citing these six seats in addition to five seats from smaller counties that also tend to vote pan-blue has been seen as giving the pan-blue coalition 11 seats before the first vote is counted.

The deep-rooted hostility between indigenous and (Taiwanese) Hoklo, and the indigenous communities' effective KMT networks, contribute to indigenous skepticism against the Democratic Progressive Party (DPP) and the indigenous tendency to vote for the KMT.

Indigenous peoples have criticized politicians for abusing the "indigenization" movement for political gains, such as indigenous opposition to the DPP's "rectification" by recognizing the Taroko for political reasons, with the majority of mountain townships voting for Ma Ying-jeou. The Atayal and Seediq slammed the Truku for their name rectification.

In 2005 the Kuomintang displayed a massive photo of the anti-Japanese indigenous leader Mona Rudao at its headquarters in honor of the 60th anniversary of Taiwan's handover from Japan to the Republic of China.

Kao Chin Su-mei led indigenous legislators to protest against the Japanese at Yasukuni shrine.

The Taipei Times ran an editorial in 2008 that rejected the idea of an apology to the indigenous, and rejected the idea of comparing Australian indigenous' centuries of 'genocidal' suffering at the hands of White Australians to the suffering of indigenous in Taiwan.

In 2016, indigenous protestors criticized Tsai for not returning to Chen Shui-bian's New Partnership quasi-state relationship, which she did not mention in her apology to the indigenous. The location of the apology, the Japanese colonial administration's governor-general, as well as the indigenous people invited to the apology, who only counted officials rather than traditional leaders, were also criticized. Indigenous Transitional Justice Alliance president Kumu Hacyo described the apology as "a political show that was put on in an extremely bureaucratic fashion" lacking in sincerity and evasive in nature. In response to the "apology" ceremony held by Tsai, KMT indigenous lawmakers refused to attend. Indigenous peoples demanded that recompense from Tsai to accompany the apology.

The derogatory term "fan" (Chinese: 番) was often used against the Plains indigenous by the Taiwanese. The Hoklo Taiwanese term was forced upon indigenous peoples like the Pazeh. In November 2016, a racist anti-indigenous slur was also used by Chiu Yi-ying, a DPP Taiwanese legislator, who said that the term meant "'unreasonable people" and was meant to describe the actions of KMT lawmakers. KMT caucus whip Sufin Siluko accused Chiu of directing the term at himself and another indigenous KMT legislator.

According to Mr. Lupiliyan, a Paiwan man who has participated in exchange activities sponsored by the government, the current government is still a colonial establishment and is "using the colonized to protect its international position". However he believes that the main beneficiaries are still the Taiwanese indigenous people. Lupiliyan says that Austronesian diplomacy and international exchanges provide them with templates on how to revitalize their own culture.

Due to these reasons, the anthropologist Scott Simon argues that the current political climate amongst indigenous people highlights a "paradox of indigeneity". Simon explains that despite the DPP's strong support of indigenous discourse and apologies to indigenous communities, Taiwanese Indigenous peoples despite being indigenous people themselves, tend to remain quite skeptical and continue to be more inclined to vote for the KMT, a political party that has largely rejected and resisted the popularization of indigenous discourse.

===== Right to hunt =====
Hunting is a traditional way of life with cultural and religious significance to the indigenous Taiwanese, but the practice has been strictly regulated by the ROC government in the name of gun control and wildlife conservation. A Bunun hunter was arrested in 2013 for hunting protected animals with an illegally modified shotgun, and convicted in 2015, prompting political discourse over the indigenous right to hunt, conservation, and gun control. In 2021 the constitutional court ruled that the government has the right to regulate guns and the hunting of wildlife even in the context of indigenous hunting, but the regulations should be updated to accommodate the need of indigenous hunting. The indigenous community mostly disagreed with the ruling made only by Han Chinese judges. The Bunun hunter eventually received a presidential pardon, but the law is still not updated.

==== Economic issues ====
Many indigenous communities did not evenly share in the benefits of the economic boom Taiwan experienced during the last quarter of the 20th century. They often lacked satisfactory educational resources on their reservations, undermining their pursuit of marketable skills. The economic disparity between the village and urban schools resulted in imposing many social barriers on indigenous people, which prevent many from moving beyond vocational training. Students transplanted into urban schools face adversity, including isolation, culture shock, and discrimination from their peers. The cultural impact of poverty and economic marginalization has led to an increase in alcoholism and prostitution among indigenous.

The economic boom resulted in drawing large numbers of indigenous peoples out of their villages and into the unskilled or low-skilled sector of the urban workforce. Manufacturing and construction jobs were generally available for low wages. The indigenous quickly formed bonds with other communities as they all had similar political motives to protect their collective needs as part of the labor force. The indigenous became the most skilled iron-workers and construction teams on the island often selected to work on the most difficult projects. The result was a mass exodus of indigenous members from their traditional lands and the cultural alienation of young people in the villages, who could not learn their languages or customs while employed. Often, young indigenous in the cities fall into gangs aligned with the construction trade. Recent laws governing the employment of laborers from Indonesia, Vietnam and the Philippines have also led to an increased atmosphere of xenophobia among urban indigenous, and encouraged the formulation of a pan-indigenous consciousness in the pursuit of political representation and protection.

Unemployment among the indigenous population of Taiwan (2005–09) _{Source: CPA 2010}
Date	Total population	Age 15 and above	Total work force	Employed	Unemployed	Labor participation rate (%)	Unemployment rate (%)
December 2005	464,961	337,351	216,756	207,493	9,263	64.25	4.27
Dec. 2006	474,919	346,366	223,288	213,548	9,740	64.47	4.36
Dec. 2007	484,174	355,613	222,929	212,627	10,302	62.69	4.62
Dec. 2008	494,107	363,103	223,464	205,765	17,699	61.54	7.92
Dec. 2009	504,531	372,777	219,465	203,412	16,053	58.87	7.31

==== Ecological issues ====
The indigenous communities of Taiwan are closely linked with ecological awareness and conservation issues on the island, as many of the environmental issues are spearheaded by indigenous peoples. Political activism and sizable public protests regarding the logging of the Chilan Formosan Cypress, as well as efforts by an Atayal member of the Legislative Yuan, "focused debate on natural resource management and specifically on the involvement of indigenous people therein". Another high-profile case is the nuclear waste storage facility on Orchid Island, a small tropical island 60 km (37 mi; 32 nmi) off the southeast coast of Taiwan. The inhabitants are the 4,000 members of the Tao (or Yami). In the 1970s the island was designated as a possible site to store low and medium grade nuclear waste. The island was selected on the grounds that it would be cheaper to build the necessary infrastructure for storage and it was thought that the population would not cause trouble.

Large-scale construction began in 1978 on a site 100 m (330 ft) from the Immorod fishing fields. The Tao alleges that government sources at the time described the site as a "factory" or a "fish cannery", intended to bring "jobs [to the] home of the Tao/Yami, one of the least economically integrated areas in Taiwan". When the facility was completed in 1982, however, it was in fact a storage facility for "97,000 barrels of low-radiation nuclear waste from Taiwan's three nuclear power plants". The Tao have since stood at the forefront of the anti-nuclear movement and launched several exorcisms and protests to remove the waste they claim has resulted in deaths and sickness. The lease on the land has expired, and an alternative site has yet to be selected.

The competition between different ways of representing and interpreting indigenous culture among local tourism operators does exist and creates tensions between indigenous tour guides and the NGOs that help to design and promote ethno/ecotourism. E.g., in a Sioulin Township, the government sponsored a project "Follow the Footsteps of Indigenous Hunters". Academics and members from environmental NGOs have suggested a new way of hunting: to replace a shotgun with a camera. Hunters benefit from the satisfaction of ecotourists who may spot wild animals under the instructions of accompanied indigenous hunters [Chen, 2012]. The rarer the animals are witnessed by tourists, the higher the pay will be to the hunters.

==== Military ====
Taiwanese indigenous people make up a greater percentage of the Republic of China Armed Forces than their percentage of the overall Taiwanese population, making up 8.7 percent of military personnel as of 2024. Taiwanese indigenous people are especially critical to elite military units where they constitute over half of the personnel in some units.

== Culture ==
=== Religion ===
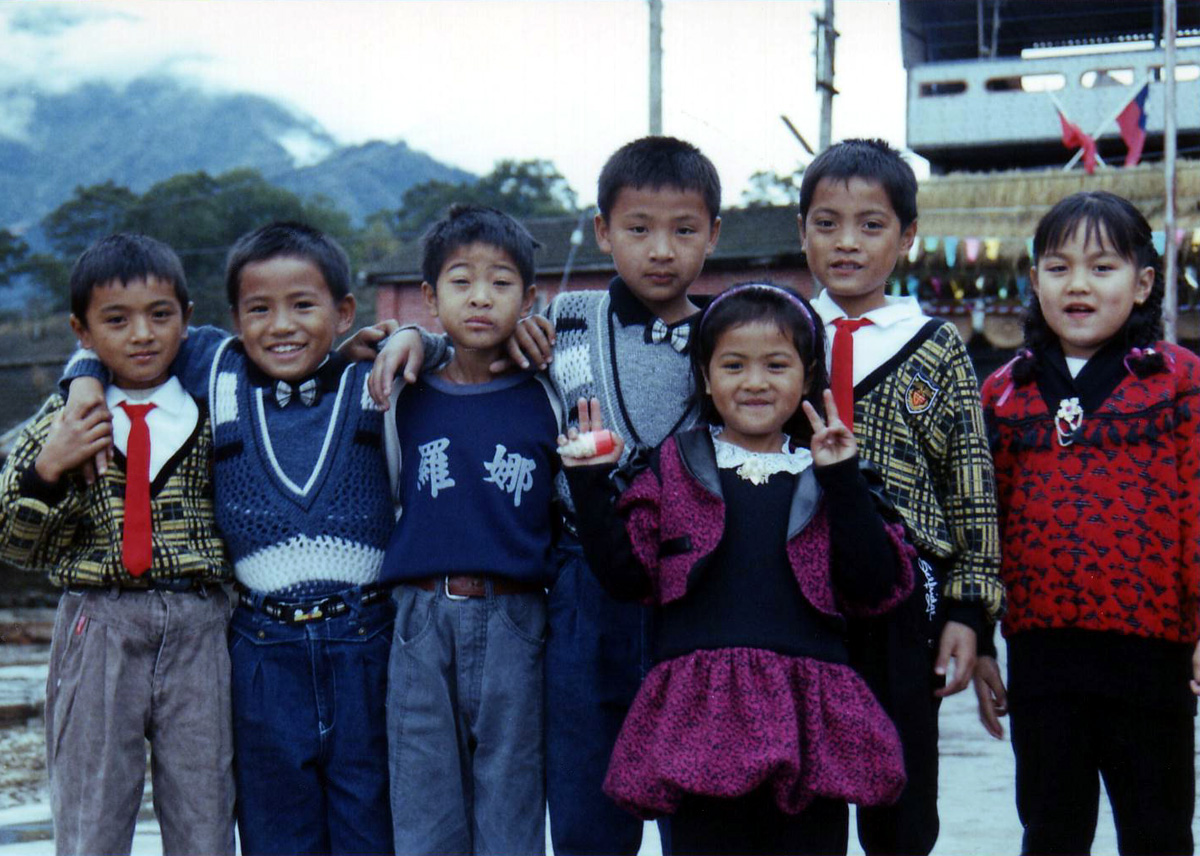
Young residents in the Bunun village of Lona, Taiwan dress up for the traditional Christmas holiday (not an official holiday in Taiwan). Christian missionaries have converted many residents to the Catholic and Protestant faiths, and the town holds two large holiday parades.

Of the current population of Taiwanese indigenous, about 70% identify themselves as Christian. Many of the Plains groups have mobilized their members around Christian organizations; most notably the Catholic Church and the Presbyterian Church in Taiwan.

Before contact with Christian missionaries during both the Dutch and Qing periods, Taiwanese indigenous peoples held a variety of beliefs in spirits, gods, sacred symbols and myths that helped their societies find meaning and order. Although there is no evidence of a unified belief system shared among the various indigenous groups, there is evidence that several groups held supernatural beliefs in certain birds and bird behavior. The Siraya were reported by Dutch sources to incorporate bird imagery into their material culture. Other reports describe animal skulls and the use of human heads in societal beliefs. The Paiwan and other southern groups worship the Formosan hundred pacer snake and use the diamond patterns on its back in many designs. In many Plains indigenous societies, the power to communicate with the supernatural world was exclusively held by women called Inibs. During the period of Dutch colonization, the Inibs were removed from the villages to eliminate their influence and pave the way for Dutch missionary work.

During the Zheng and Qing eras, Han immigrants brought Confucianized beliefs of Taoism and Buddhism to Taiwan's indigenous people. Many Plains indigenous adopted Han religious practices, though there is evidence that many indigenous customs were transformed into local Taiwanese Han beliefs. In some parts of Taiwan the Siraya spirit of fertility, Ali-zu (A-li-tsu) has become assimilated into the Han pantheon. The use of female spirit mediums (tongji) can also be traced to the earlier matrilineal Inibs.

Although many indigenous people assumed Han religious practices, several sub-groups sought protection from the European missionaries, who had started arriving in the 1860s. Many of the early Christian converts were displaced groups of Plains indigenous peoples who sought protection from the oppressive Han. The missionaries, under the articles of extraterritoriality, offered a form of power against the Qing establishment and could thus make demands on the government to provide redress for the complaints of Plains indigenous. Many of these early congregations have served to maintain indigenous identity, language and cultures.

The influence of 19th- and 20th-century missionaries has both transformed and maintained indigenous integration. Many of the churches have replaced earlier community functions, but continue to retain a sense of continuity and community that unites members of indigenous societies against the pressures of modernity. Several church leaders have emerged from within the communities to take on leadership positions in petitioning the government in the interest of indigenous peoples and seeking a balance between the interests of the communities and economic vitality.

=== Music ===
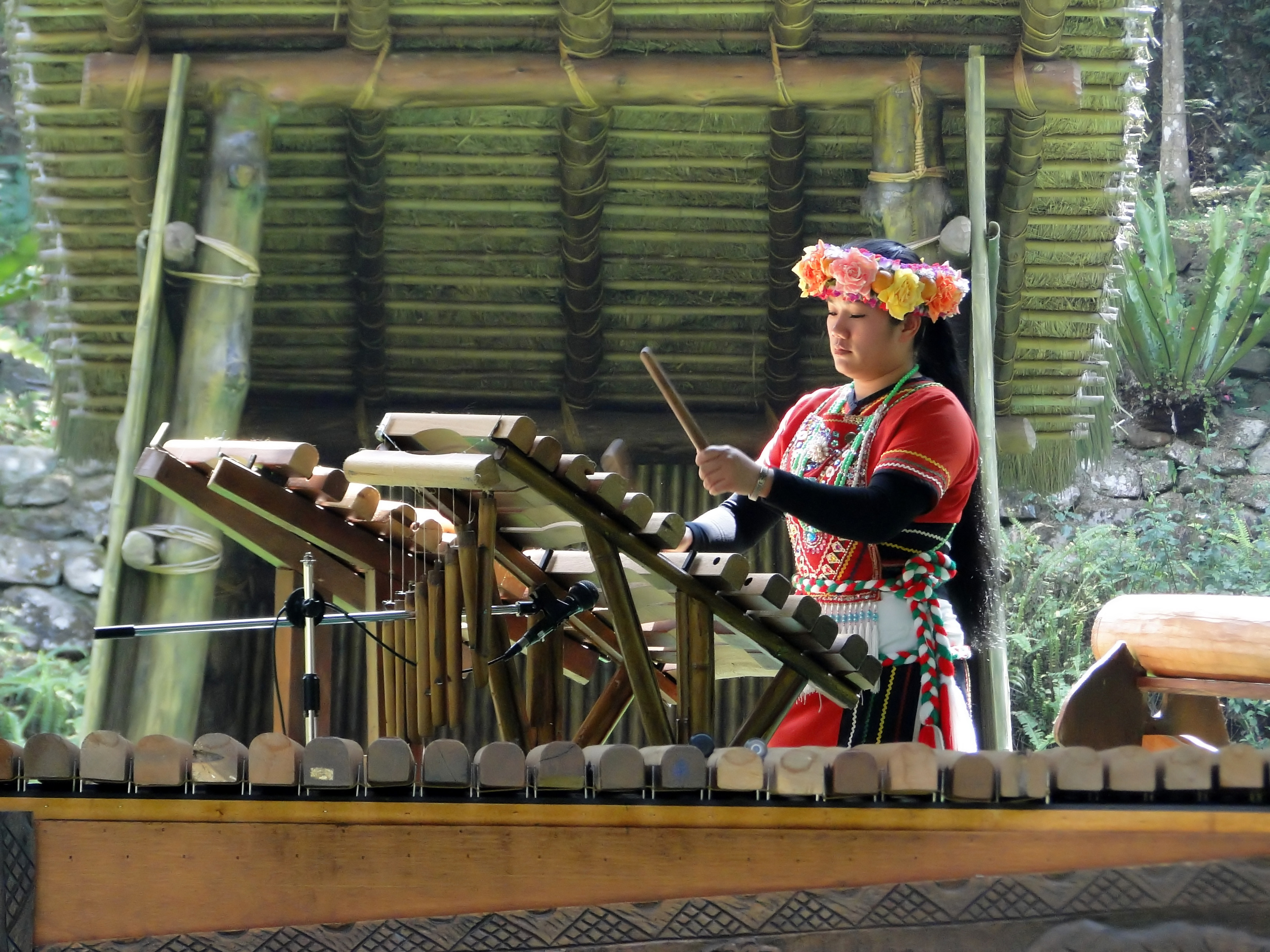
Young woman playing music in the Formosan indigenous Culture Village

A full-time indigenous radio station, "Ho-hi-yan", was launched in 2005 with the help of the Executive Yuan, to focus on issues of interest to the indigenous community. This came on the heels of a "New wave of Indigenous Pop", as indigenous artists, such as A-mei, Pur-dur and Samingad (Puyuma), Difang, A-Lin (Amis), Princess Ai 戴愛玲 (Paiwan), and Landy Wen (Atayal) became international pop-stars. The rock musician Chang Chen-yue is a member of the Ami. Music has given indigenous people both a sense of pride and a sense of cultural ownership.

The issue of ownership was exemplified when the musical project Enigma used an Ami chant in their song "Return to Innocence", which was selected as the official theme of the 1996 Atlanta Olympics. The main chorus was sung by Difang and his wife, Igay. The Amis couple successfully sued Enigma's record label, which then paid royalties to the French museum that held the master recordings of the traditional songs, but the original artists, who had been unaware of the Enigma project, remained uncompensated.

=== Parks, tourism, and commercialization ===
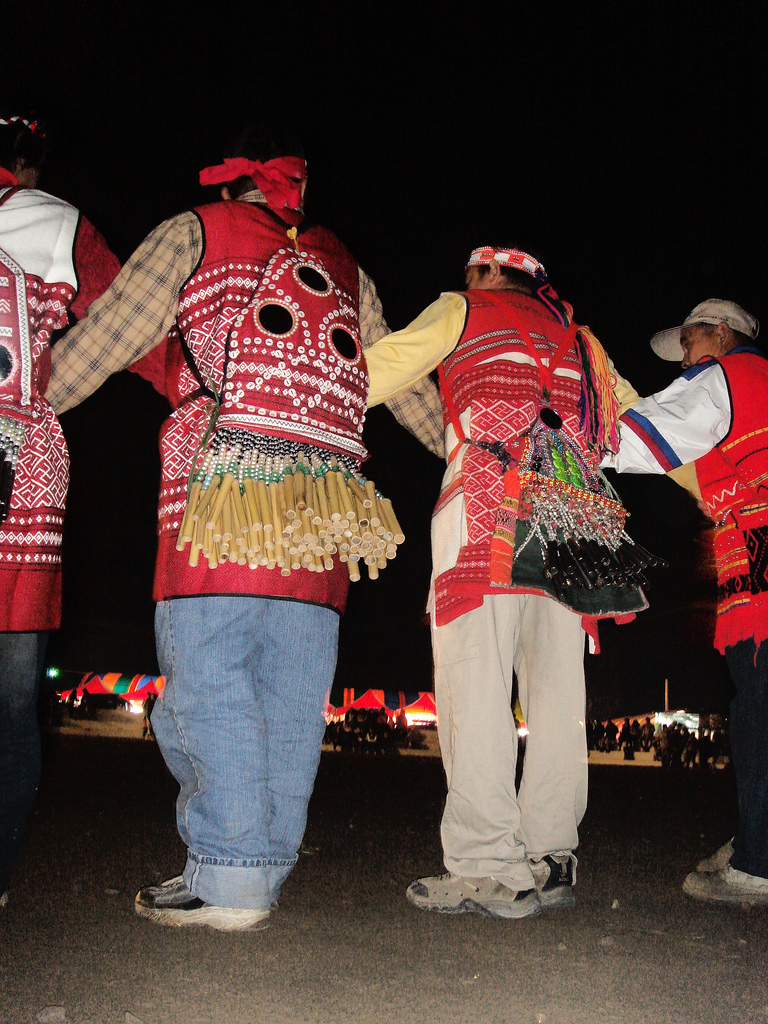
Pas-ta'ai, a ritual of the Saisiyat people

Indigenous groups are seeking to preserve their folkways and languages as well as to return to, or remain on, their traditional lands. Eco-tourism, sewing and selling carvings, jewellery and music have become viable areas of economic opportunity. However, tourism-based commercial development, such as the creation of the Taiwan indigenous Culture Park, is not a panacea. Although these create new jobs, indigenous people are seldom given management positions. Moreover, some national parks have been built on indigenous lands against the wishes of the local communities, prompting one Taroko activist to label the Taroko National Park as a form of environmental colonialism. At times, the creation of national parks has resulted in the forced resettlement of the indigenous.

Due to the close proximity of indigenous land to the mountains, many communities have hoped to cash in on hot spring ventures and hotels, where they offer singing and dancing to add to the ambience. The Wulai Atayal, in particular, have been active in this area. Considerable government funding has been allocated to museums and culture centers focusing on Taiwan's indigenous heritage. Critics often call the ventures exploitative and "superficial portrayals" of indigenous culture, which distract attention from the real problems of substandard education. Proponents of ethno-tourism suggest that such projects can positively impact the public image and economic prospects of the indigenous community.

The attractive tourist destination includes natural resources, infrastructure, customs and culture, as well as the characteristics of the local industry. Thus, the role of the local community in influencing the tourism development activities is clear. The essence of tourism in today's world is the development and delivery of travel and visitation experiences to a range of individuals and groups who wish to see, understand, and experience the nature of different destinations and the way people live, work, and enjoy life in those destinations. The attitude of local people towards tourists constitutes one of the elements of a destination's tourism value chain. The attraction is a tourist area's experience theme, the main appeal is the formation of the fundamentals of the tourism image in the region [Kao, 1995]. Attraction sources can be diverse, including the area's natural resources, economic activities, customs, development history, religion, outdoor recreation activities, events and other related resources. This way, the awareness of indigenous resources constitutes an attraction to tourists. The indigenous culture is an important indicator of tourism products' attractiveness and a new source of economic growth.

While there is an important need to link the economic, cultural, and ecological imperatives of development in the context of tourism enterprises, there is the key question of implementation and how the idea of sustainable tourism enterprises can be translated into reality: formulation of strategies and how they may be expected to interact with important aspects of indigenous culture. In addition to being locally directed and relevant, the planning process for the establishment of an ethno/ecotourism enterprise in an indigenous community should be strategic in nature. The use of a strategic planning process enables indigenous culture to be regarded as an important characteristic requiring careful consideration, rather than a feature to be exploited, or an incidental characteristic that is overshadowed by the natural features of the environment.

==== Pulima Art Festival ====
The Pulima Art Festival (藝術節; also known as Pulima Arts Festival) is a biennial event held since 2012 which showcases indigenous art and culture and is the biggest indigenous contemporary art event in Taiwan. Pulima is a Paiwan word meaning "creative or highly skilled people". Inspired by the Edinburgh Art Festival and the Festival d'Avignon in France, Pulima is supported by the Indigenous Peoples Cultural Foundation. Dancers and musicians from Taiwan as well as abroad feature in the festival, which takes place between November and February every second year, and awards a prize called the Pulima Art Prize.

The festival was held in Taipei in 2012 and 2014, and in Kaohsiung in 2016. In 2016, the Atamira Dance Company and Black Grace came from New Zealand, and B2M (Bathurst to Melville), a band from the Tiwi Islands, Australia also performed at the festival.

The 2018 festival took place in the Museum of Contemporary Art Taipei Under the theme "MICAWOR – Turning Over", it displayed the talents of 26 groups of Taiwanese and international artists, and included a series of international forums, artist lectures, workshops and many other events. It collaborated with Melbourne's YIRRAMBOI Festival, with a "Festival in Festival" program.

The Pulima Arts Festival took place from 2020 to 2021 and several videos of participants are available on YouTube.

=== Indigenous Peoples' Day ===
In 2016, the administration under President Tsai Ing-wen approved a proposal that designated 1 August as Indigenous Peoples' Day in Taiwan. In celebration of the special day, President Tsai issued an official apology to the country's indigenous people and outlined steps to further promote legislation and involve organizations related to indigenous causes, such as the Presidential Office's Indigenous Historical Justice and Transitional Justice Committee. The government hopes the day will remind the public of the diverse ethnic groups in Taiwan by bringing greater respect for indigenous peoples' cultures and history and promoting their rights.

== Genetics ==
Present Austronesian-speaking groups, which include Taiwanese indigenous peoples, are strongly related to 11 kya to 8 kya Qihe individuals from Fujian. There is also evidence of excess allele sharing between Ami and Atayal and a 2,500 year old individual from mainland Japan, which was characterized by 'typical Jōmon culture'. However, these affinities more likely reflect shared ancestry or genetic input from the Jōmon into Taiwanese indigenous people themselves. Other studies show no significant gene flow from Taiwanese indigenous people to the Jōmon, including Ryukyuan Jōmon. The Ami and Atayal also received significant contribution from Late Neolithic Fujianese-related sources (66.9–74.3%), which was additionally introduced into Han Chinese from Fujian and Guangdong (35.0–40.3%) and Kra-Dai speakers (40.7–53.9%). The Hlai, who are described as unadmixed proto-Tai-Kadai speakers, also form a 'clean clade' with Atayal and Ami.

A 2021 study shows strong genetic affinities between Ami and Yami and the Igorots of the Philippines. The Ami and Yami also share IBD segments with the East Polynesian populations of Society Archipelago, which are relatively long on average. The latter can be explained as a result of these groups settling uninhabited islands instead of previously populated regions. Another study detected 77% Austronesian-related ancestral components in the Ami and Atayal, with 21% and 18% Sino-Tibetan-related ancestral components being found in both groups respectively. Taiwanese Han also have 15% Islander Southeast Asian ancestry, which can be attributed to admixture with Austronesian populations although it is more likely that this admixture occurred before Taiwanese Han migrated to Taiwan. Han Chinese from other southern provinces like Guangdong and Sichuan also exhibit ancient admixture with Ami and Atayal.

According to a 2023 study, Rukai excessively share alleles with Into-Taiwan groups and Out-of-Taiwan groups and cluster with ~7.7 kya Liangdao and ~4.5 kya Suogang individuals, who are considered to be 'proto-Austronesians'. This suggests less genetic drift in the ancestral Rukai population, compared to other ancestral Taiwanese populations. Alternatively, they suggest close affinities between Rukai and Into-Taiwan groups, who later became Out-of-Taiwan groups. After the settlement of Taiwan, the Into-Taiwan groups diverged, with Atayal experiencing the strongest bottleneck/isolation. Atayal were also more related to ~1.5 kya Hanben individuals and ancient and modern populations from mainland southern East Asia. Central Taiwanese populations like the Bunun were likewise more related to the Atayal. Meanwhile, there were closer genetic affinities between Ami and Out-of-Taiwan groups. However, this can be explained by recent back migration and contact. Nonetheless, there is also evidence of southern Taiwanese groups mixing with Pazeh and Siraya, increasing their affinities with Mainland Southeast Asian populations. Early Out-of-Taiwan (i.e. Lapita) groups have increased Northern East Asian ancestry compared to Into-Taiwan groups (~21–29% vs. ~0–8%), with Northern East Asian ancestry further increasing in present Taiwan Highland/Taiwan Orchid Island groups (~28–37%) and Kankanaey (~33%) groups. This suggests more Northern East Asian influence prior to the Out-of-Taiwan expansion or the presence of unsampled Into-Taiwan groups with more Northern East Asian ancestry.

Despite being a founding paternal lineage for Austronesian populations, haplogroup O1a-M119 is more common among Taiwanese indigenous populations than Austronesian populations from Southeast Asian islands. This haplogroup also peaks in Tai-Kadai populations, especially those living in southeast China.

There is evidence of non-Austronesian-speaking populations settling in Taiwan about 1.6 kya, along with trade with South Asians since 400 BCE.

=== Claimed admixture with Taiwanese Han ===
A study by Marie Lin in 2007 reported that the human leukocyte antigen typing study and mitochondrial DNA analysis demonstrated that 85% of the Taiwanese Han population had some degree of indigenous origin. Other studies by Chen Shun-Shen state that 20% to 60%, and then more than 88% of Taiwanese Han have indigenous blood. These studies were criticized by other researchers and refuted by subsequent genetic studies. Not long after Lin's 2007 publication, several academics pointed out errors in Lin's statistical analysis, and questioned why some of her numbers contradicted each other. Subsequent full genome studies using large sample sizes and comparing thousands of single nucleotide polymorphisms have come to the conclusion that Taiwanese Han people are primarily of mainland Chinese descent and have only very limited genetic admixture from the indigenous population.

Estimates of genetic indigenous ancestry reported by Lin range from 13%, 26%, and as high as 85%, the latter number being published in an editorial that was not peer-reviewed. These numbers have taken hold in popular Taiwanese imagination and sometimes treated as facts in Taiwanese politics and identity. Many Taiwanese claim to be part indigenous. Chen suggests that the estimates resulted from manipulation of sample sizes. The lack of methodological rigor suggests the numbers were meant for local consumption. In all other scientific studies, genetic markers for indigenous ancestry make up a minute portion of the genome. A 2016 study by Chen et al. found that the Taiwanese Han shared a common genetic background with Han Chinese populations worldwide similar to other southern Han Chinese, and were quite genetically distinct from Taiwanese Austronesians and neighbouring Southeast Asians and Taiwanese Austronesian tribes.

In 2021, study by Lo et al. co-authored by Lin revealed that most Taiwanese Han had considerable proportions of Austronesian-related ancestry. However, this Austronesian-related ancestry was observable in other Han Chinese populations in mainland China and among Chinese Singaporeans, suggesting that the admixture event occurred 4,000 years ago in mainland China during the southward migration of East Asians. This means that most Taiwanese Han already had ancient Austronesian admixture (see Baiyue people) before migrating to Taiwan. This does not rule out more recent admixture, but only one in five hundred Taiwanese Han individuals was grouped closer to the Dusun people, who are more similar to Taiwanese indigenous peoples than Sino-Tibetan populations. The researchers observed "distinct patterns of genetic structure between the Taiwanese Han and indigenous populations", concluding that the Taiwanese Han population already had Island Southeast Asian (ISEA) ancestry prior to arriving in Taiwan. Taiwanese Han people are genetically closest to Cantonese people and Chinese Singaporeans out of the Sino-Tibetan populations.

The narrative of widespread intermarriage between Han men and indigenous women has also been challenged by Su-Jen Huang in a 2013 paper. According to Huang, intermarriage only involved a small minority of Han males. Historical sources only report men outnumbering women but not widespread intermarriage between Han men and indigenous women. Only specific cases of intermarriage are mentioned while historical accounts indicate that the majority of Han men went back to the mainland to seek marriage. The gender imbalance also only lasted until the end of the early Qing period. Due to mass migration, within a few decades, the Han population vastly outnumbered the indigenous people so that even if intermarriage did happen it would have been impossible to meet the demand. The fact that indigenous tribes survived all the way up until Japanese colonization indicates that indigenous women did not marry with Han men en masse.

However the idea that Taiwanese Han are a hybrid population genetically different from Chinese Han has been used as a basis for Taiwanese independence from China. This belief has been called the "myth of indigenous genes" by some researchers such as Shu-juo Chen and Hong-kuan Duan, who say that "genetic studies have never supported the idea that Taiwanese Han are genetically different with Chinese Han."

The idea that "We are all indigenous people" was initially welcomed by indigenous leaders but has faced increasing opposition as it became viewed as a tool for Taiwanese independence. On 9 August 2005, a celebration for the constitutional reforms protecting indigenous rights was held, during which Premier Frank Hsieh announced that he had an indigenous great-grandmother and that "Now you shouldn't say: 'you are indigenous, I am not.' Everyone is indigenous." Descendants of plains indigenous have opposed the usage of their ancestors in the call for Taiwanese independence. Genetic studies show genetic differences between the Taiwanese Han and the mountain indigenous. According to Chen and Duan, the genetic ancestry of individuals cannot be traced with certainty and attempts to construct identity through genetics are "theoretically meaningless".

The Plains "Pingpu" indigenous of Taiwan criticized Lin's studies, which follow the "blood line theory" of Taiwanese nationalism. Alak Akatuang, secretary of the Pingpu Indigenous Peoples Cultural Association, said that the pan-green camp used the indigenous peoples to create a national identity for Taiwan, but the idea that Taiwanese people are not overwhelmingly descended from Han settlers is false. According to Akatuang, Taiwan's independence should not be founded on the idea of genetic lineages and these people who believe in the blood line theory "ignore scientific evidence because they want to believe they are different from China." This harmed the legitimacy of the Pingpu movement for recognition and reparations and was deeply insulting: "The Pingpu were the first of Taiwan's Indigenous peoples to face colonization. After the Han people came, they stole our land. They murdered our ancestors. Then after a few hundred years, they said we were the same people. Do you think a Pingpu person can accept this?"

In the highest self reports, 5.3 percent of Taiwan's population claimed indigenous heritage.

== See also ==
- A New Partnership Between the Indigenous Peoples and the Government of Taiwan
- Austronesian peoples
- Batan Islands
- Battle of Shalu Village
- Firearms regulation in Taiwan
- Formosan indigenous Culture Village
- Han Taiwanese
- History of Taiwan
- Indigenous Area (Taiwan)
- Indigenous Peoples' Day
- List of ethnic groups in Taiwan
- Seediq Bale (2011 film based on the Musha Incident)
- Shung Ye Museum of Formosan indigenous
- Taiwan Indigenous Television
- Taiwanese Hokkien
