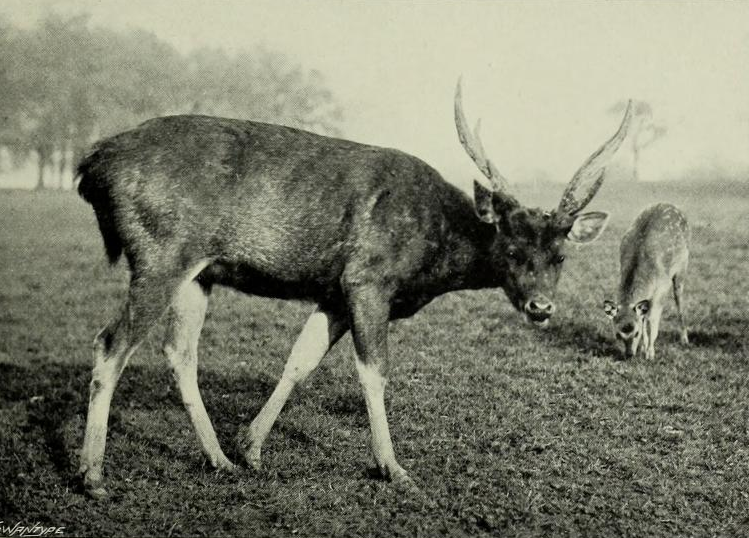

Scientific classification
- Kingdom: Animalia
- Phylum: Chordata
- Class: Mammalia
- Order: Artiodactyla
- Family: Cervidae
- Genus: Rusa
- Species: R. unicolor
- Subspecies: R. u. swinhoei

Trinomial name
- Rusa unicolor swinhoei (Sclater, 1862)

= Formosan sambar deer =

Formosan sambar

Subspecies of deer

The Formosan sambar (Rusa unicolor swinhoei) is a subspecies of the sambar found in Taiwan. It is the largest native herbivore there. Its fur color changes with season to provide camouflage. It is yellowish-brown in the summer and dark brown in the winter.
