= Spanish East Indies =

Spanish colony from 1565 to 1901

Spanish East Indies Indias Orientales Españolas (Spanish) Siláñgañg Kaindyahán nañg Espanya (Tagalog)
- 1565–1901
- Flag Coat of arms
- Motto: Plus Ultra "Further Beyond"
- Anthem: Marcha Real "Royal March"
- Spanish East Indies
- Status: Colonies of the Spanish Empire: Territories of New Spain (1565–1821)
- Capital: Cebu (1565–1571); Manila (1571–1898); Iloilo (13 August – 10 December 1898)
- Official languages: Spanish
- Common languages: Philippine languages Micronesian languages Chamorro; Yapese; Palauan; East Formosan languages Hokkien (Note: Among Sangley immigrants in Spanish Philippines and Han Taiwanese in Spanish Formosa)
- Religion: Roman Catholicism (state religion), Islam, Philippine traditional religion, Micronesian traditional religion, Taiwanese aboriginal traditional religion, Chinese folk religion
- Monarch
  - 1565–1598 (first): Philip II
  - 1886–1898 (last): Alfonso XIII
- Governor-General
  - 1565–1572 (first): Miguel López de Legazpi
  - 1899 (last): Diego de los Ríos
- Legislature: Cortes Generales
- Historical era: Spanish Empire
  - Legazpi colonizes Cebu: 27 April 1565
  - Loss of Spanish Formosa to the Dutch: 26 August 1642
  - Spanish forces expelled from Manado and Minahasa Peninsula by the Dutch: 10 August 1658
  - Spanish Evacuation from Moluccas: 2 May 1663
  - Remaining Spanish forces in Siau Island and the rest of Sangihe Islands expelled by joint Dutch and Ternate forces: 3 November 1677
  - Spanish-American War: 21 April 1898
  - Philippine declaration of independence: 12 June 1898
  - United States annexation of the Philippines and Guam: 10 December 1898
  - Sale of the remaining islands to Germany: 12 February 1899
  - Remaining islands ceded to the United States: 23 March 1901

Area
- 1877: 345,155 km^{2} (133,265 sq mi)

Population
  - 1877: 5,567,685
- Currency: Spanish dollar, Spanish peseta
Preceded by
Viceroyalty of New Spain
Bruneian Empire
Sultanate of Ternate
Succeeded by
1899: German New Guinea
1898: Dictatorial Government of the Philippines
Military Government of the Philippine Islands
Naval Government of Guam
1642: Dutch Formosa
1658: Company rule in the Dutch East Indies
1663: Company rule in the Dutch East Indies
1677: Company rule in the Dutch East Indies
- Today part of: Japan Bonin Islands; Federated States of Micronesia; Indonesia North Sulawesi North Maluku; Palau; Philippines; Taiwan; United States Guam Northern Mariana Islands

The Spanish East Indies (Note: Spanish: Indias orientales españolas; Filipino: Silangang Indiyas ng Espanya) were the colonies of the Spanish Empire in Asia and Oceania from 1565 to 1901, governed through the captaincy general in Manila for the Spanish Crown, initially reporting to Mexico City, then later directly reporting to Madrid after the Spanish American Wars of Independence.

The king of Spain traditionally styled himself "King of the East and West Indies" (Spanish: Rey de las Indias Orientales y Occidentales).

From 1565 to 1821 these territories, together with the Spanish West Indies, were administered through the Viceroyalty of New Spain based in Mexico City. After independence of the Mexican Empire, Manila reported directly to Madrid. The territories ruled included present-day Philippines, Guam and the Mariana Islands, as well as Palau, part of Micronesia, and for a period Northern Taiwan and parts of North Sulawesi and the Moluccas (Dutch East Indies (VOC)). Cebu was the first seat of government when the Spanish first arrived in the Philippines, which was later transferred to Manila.

After the fall of Manila during the Spanish–American War in 1898, the United States occupied the city and the Spanish colonial government moved its capital to Iloilo, their strongest remaining stronghold in the Philippines. However, they soon surrendered the city to local revolutionary forces before American occupation. Spain later sold other smaller islands to Germany in the German–Spanish Treaty of 1899, and the few remaining islands were ceded to the United States when the Treaty of Washington was ratified in 1901.

== History ==
=== Exploration and settlement (1521–1643) ===
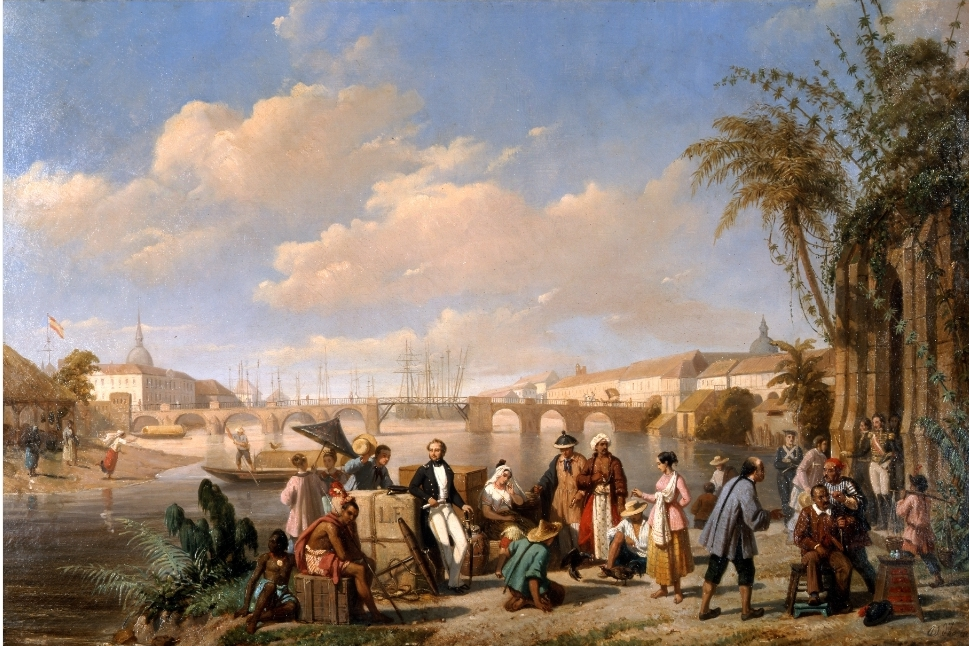
Trades in the Manila through the Rio de Pasig.

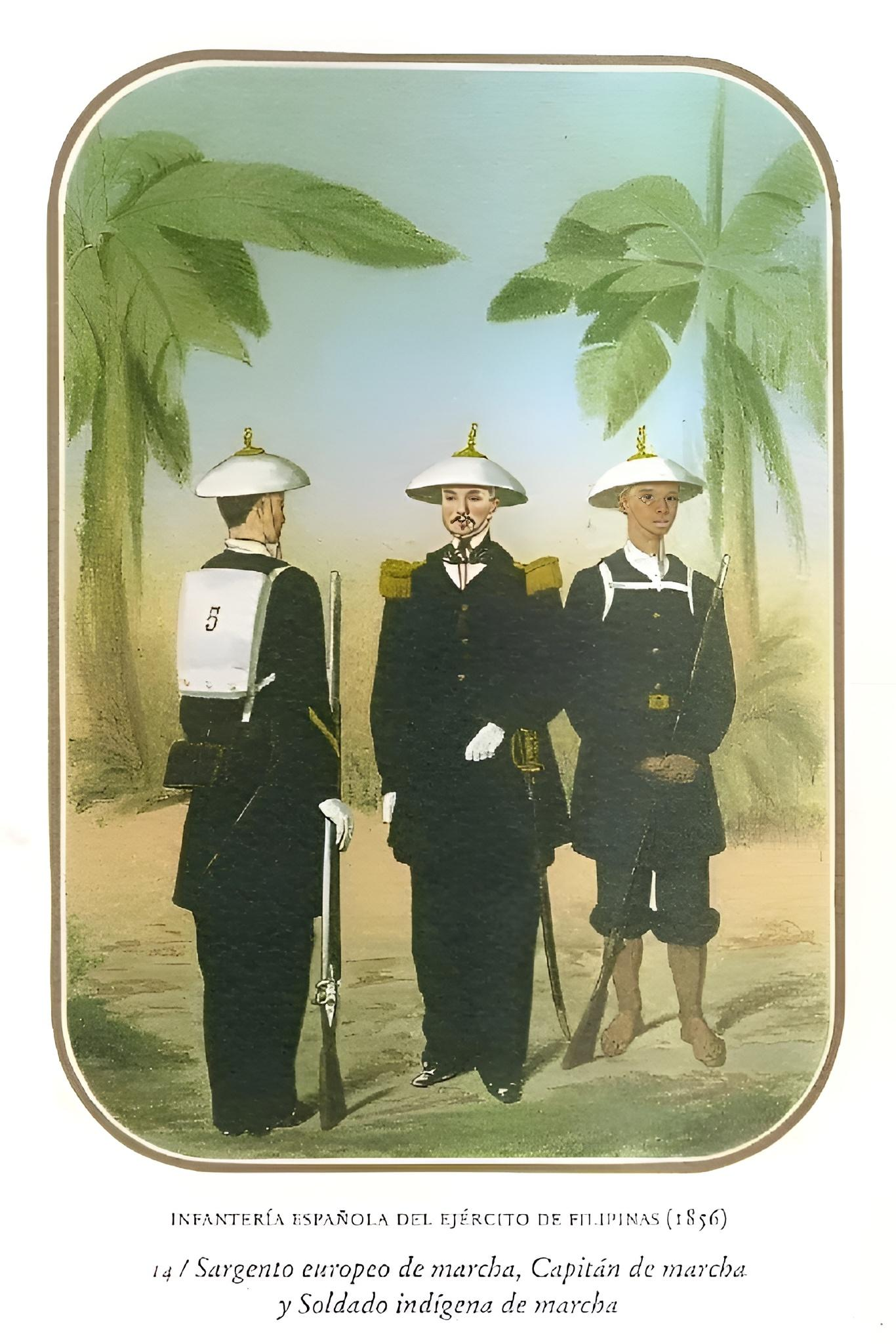
Infantry army uniforms in the Philippines, 1856

With the Portuguese guarding access to the Indian Ocean around the Cape, a monopoly supported by papal bulls and the Treaty of Tordesillas, Spanish contact with the Far East waited until the success of the 1519–1522 Magellan–Elcano expedition that found a Southwest Passage around South America into the Pacific. The expedition reached the outskirts of the East Indies on 6 March 1521, sighting the Marianas. Upon reaching the Philippines, Magellan was able to convert and ally with Rajah Humabon, the Rajah of Cebu at that time, but died shortly thereafter in the Battle of Mactan while trying to shore up Humabon's control over nearby islands. When the expedition's new leaders refused to honor Magellan's will and free his Malay slave Enrique, Enrique—who also acted as their interpreter—was able to turn Humabon against them, provoking a massacre of the Spanish on 1 May. Consolidated onto the Trinidad and the Victoria, the survivors were able to reach the city-state of Tidore in the Spice Islands on 8 November. Its sultan Al-Mansur promptly pledged his realm as Spain's vassal the next day, hoping to use them as a counterweight to Portuguese support of his rival Bayan Sirrullah of Ternate. (Within a year, he was joined in this by Yusuf, sultan of Jailolo on nearby Halmahera.) However, by 14 May 1522 the Portuguese (under Antonio de Brito) forced Al-Mansur to surrender the Spaniards who had stayed in his realm and abjure any connection to Spain. The Victoria limped back to Spain to complete the first circumnavigation of the globe on September 6, and the Trinidad surrendered herself to de Brito to avoid starvation in November. Charles I signed away any remaining interests in the East Indies for 350,000 ducats in the Capitulation of Zaragoza on 22 April 1529.

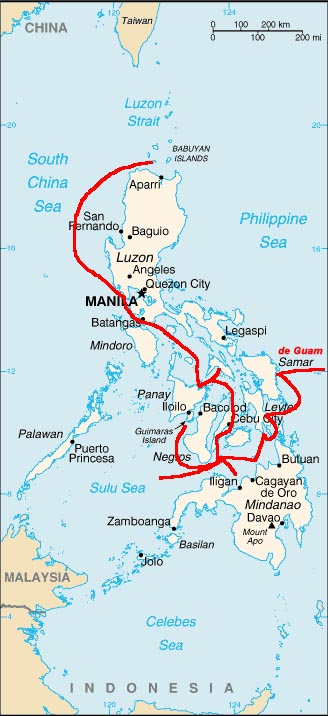
Routes of early Spanish expeditions in the Philippines.

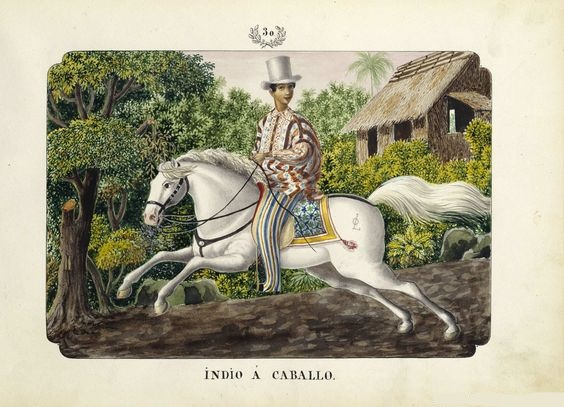
Native Filipino, 1800s.

Seeking to develop trade between the East Indies and the Americas across the Pacific Ocean, Antonio de Mendoza encouraged the exploration of these Asian territories and commissioned the expedition of his in-law Ruy López de Villalobos to the Philippines in 1542–1543. Miguel López de Legazpi set out from Mexico, and established the first Spanish settlement in the Philippines in 1565, which became the town of San Miguel in present-day Cebu. That same year, another member of the expedition, Andrés de Urdaneta, discovered a maritime route from the Philippines to Mexico, across the Pacific, leading to the important transpacific transport link of the Manila-Acapulco galleons.

In 1571, exploiting a rivalry between the states of Tondo and Maynila, the later being a city-state established by Bruneian Islamic colonists, meant to supplant Tondo, the Spaniards captured Maynila and renamed it Manila, a former satellite-state of the Brunei Sultanate and then Manila was made the seat of the Spanish Captaincy General of the Philippines. The Hindu Rajahnate of Butuan and the Kedatuans of Dapitan and Madja-as willingly joined the Spaniards to ally against their common Muslim rivals (Spain recently expelled the Muslims who invaded their homeland at the culmination of the Reconquista), Zamboanga was also taken from the Sultanate of Sulu via the efforts of Spanish and Peruvian soldiers and native allies as all these territories were incorporated into the Spanish East Indies.

The Philippines became the center of operations for further Spanish wars in Asia including the Castilian War against the Sultanate of Brunei, raids against the Ottoman protectorate of the Sultanate of Aceh, the brief conquests of the Sultanates of Tidor and Ternate as well as Spanish campaigns into Cambodia and Taiwan. These and other Asian territories claimed by the Spanish crown were to be governed from the Viceroyalty of New Spain in Mexico City.

The Manila-Acapulco galleons shipped products gathered from both Asia-Pacific and the Americas, such as silk, spices, silver, gold and other Asian-Pacific islander products to Mexico. Products brought from Asia-Pacific were sent to Veracruz and shipped to Spain and, via trading, to the rest of Europe, while Spanish-Mexican navigators brought with them Hispanic and indigenous Mexican customs, religion, languages, foods, and cultural traditions to the Philippines, Guam, and the Mariana Islands.

In 1606, the Spaniards established trade links with the Maluku Islands, which continued until 1663. Contacts with Japan were also established and Sebastián Vizcaíno was sent as ambassador in 1611, until Japan closed its trading post in 1630. In northeastern Taiwan, the Spaniards built Fort Santo Domingo near Keelung in 1626 and a mission in Tamsui in 1628, which they occupied until they lost in the Second Battle of San Salvador. Several Pacific islands were visited by Spanish ships in the 16th century, including New Guinea (Yñigo Ortiz de Retez in 1545), the Solomon Islands (Pedro Sarmiento de Gamboa in 1568), and the Marquesas Islands (Álvaro de Mendaña de Neira in 1595), but they made no effort to trade with or colonize them.

During the first half of the seventeenth century, there were a number of clashes with the Dutch in and around the Spanish East Indies as the Dutch expanded their interests in Southeast Asia. The most important of these were a series of naval battles in 1646, when the local Spanish forces defeated a concerted effort of the Dutch to take control of the Philippines.

In 1668, Blessed Diego Luis de San Vitores established the first mission on Guam, where he and Saint Pedro Calungsod were later martyred.

In October 1762, a British expeditionary force captured Manila and occupied it for twenty months as part of the Seven Years' War. Subsequent British attempts to expand into Bulacan, Pampanga and Ilocos were frustrated by Spanish and native resistance, and the expeditionary force remained confined to Manila and Cavite. Several native leaders, such as Diego Silang, revolted against the Spanish after being promised British support, but none were successful. Under the terms of the 1763 Treaty of Paris, all British-occupied territories in the Spanish East Indies were returned to Spain, with the handover occurring in April 1764. The loss of Manila was a large blow to Spanish pride and partly prompted the Bourbon Reforms.

== Colonial government ==
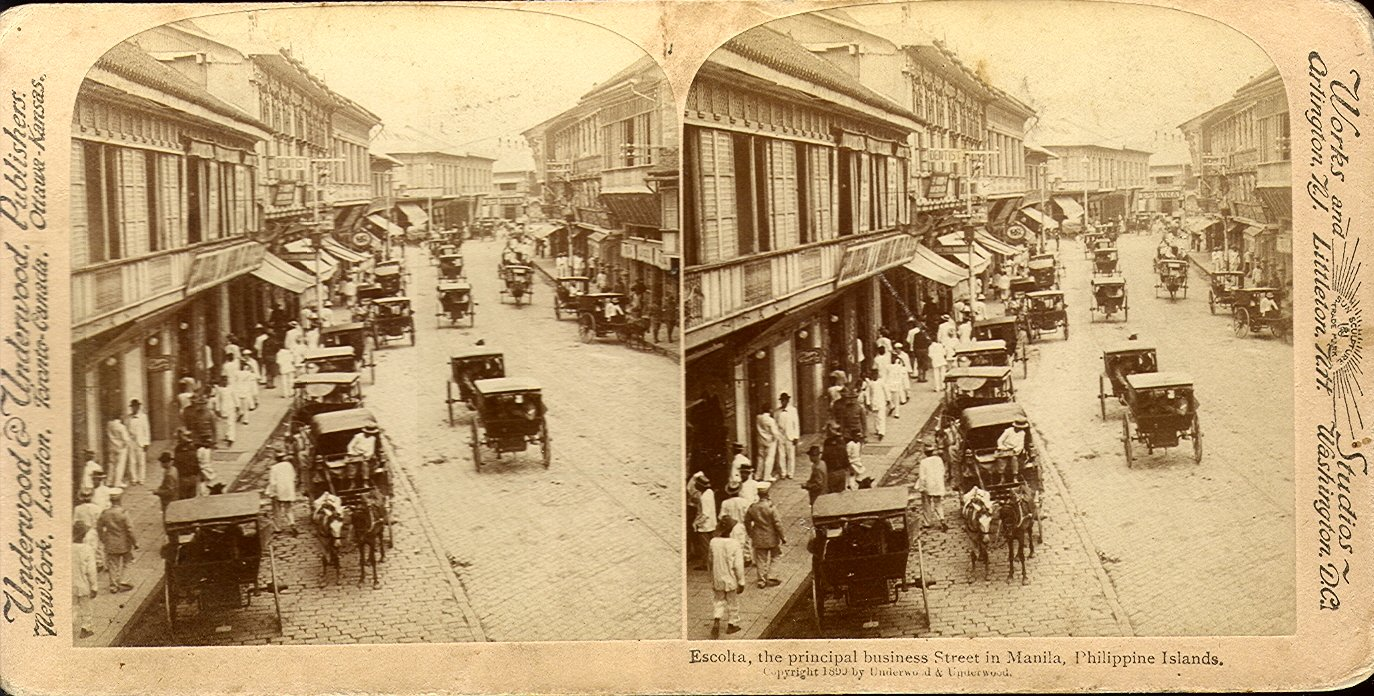
Manila, capital of the Spanish East Indies, 1899.

The Seven Years' War prompted Charles III to initiate extensive governmental reforms throughout the overseas possessions. An intendencia was established in Manila in 1784 to handle the government finances and to promote the economy. (The plan to introduce more intendencias throughout the Philippines did not materialize.) In a similar vein, to promote innovation and education among the residents of the islands, Governor-General José Basco y Vargas established the Economic Society of the Friends of the Country.

For over 256 years, the Spanish East Indies were governed by a governor-captain general, and an audiencia. All economic matters of the Philippines were managed by the Viceroyalty of New Spain, located in Mexico. Because the eastward route was more widely used for military purposes, in addition to commerce that included the Manila-Acapulco galleon trade, most government correspondence went through Mexico, rather than directly to Spain (with the exception of a short period at the end of the 18th century).

In 1821, the New Spanish Viceroyalty collapsed following the Mexican War of Independence, which resulted in the First Mexican Empire. All control of the Spanish East Indies government was then transferred to Madrid, until the United States annexed most Spanish territories in the Asia-Pacific region after the Spanish–American War of 1898.

=== The Audiencia and Captaincy General ===
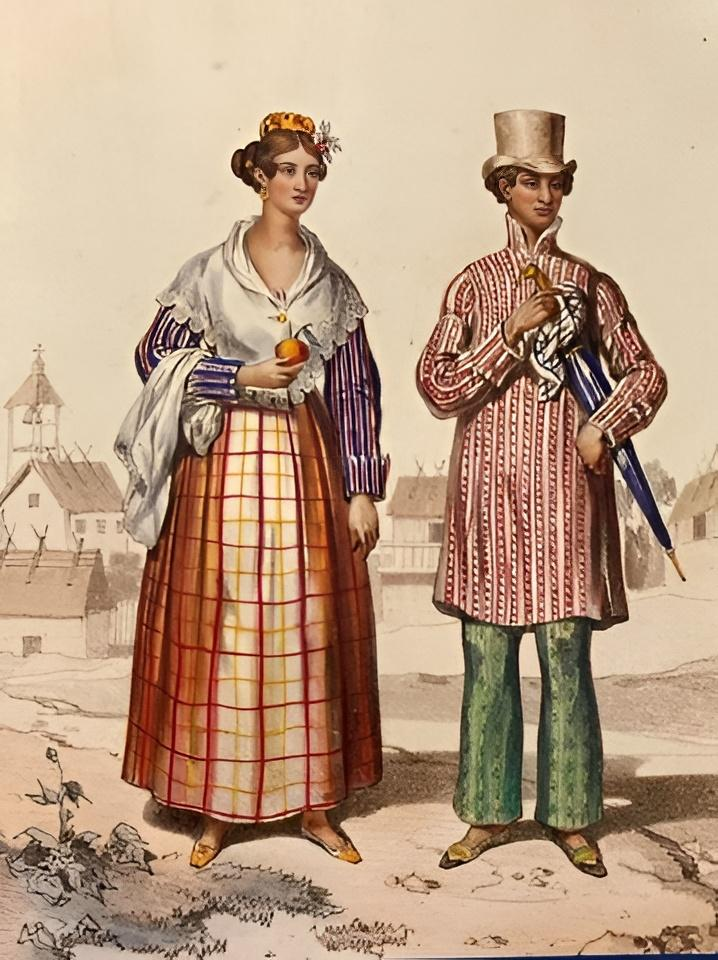
Spanish Mestizo Filipinos, 1800s

In 1574, the Captaincy General of the Philippines was created as a dependency of the Viceroyalty of New Spain. The Real Audiencia of Manila was created on 5 May 1583 and the first session was held on 15 June 1584 as the highest tribunal of the Spanish Empire in the East Indies, that had the Governor-General of the Philippines as its ex officio highest judge. Both institutions were created by the Royal Decree of King Felipe II.

Law XI (Audiencia y Chancillería Real de Manila en las Filipinas) of Title XV (De las Audiencias y Chancillerias Reales de las Indias) of Book II of the Recopilación de Leyes de los Reynos de las Indias of 1680—which compiles the original decree and the one of 25 May 1596—describes the limits and functions of the Audiencia and its president.

"In the city of Manila on the Island of Luzon, Head of the Philippines, shall reside another Royal Audiencia and Chancellery of ours, with a president, who shall be governor and captain general; four judges of civil cases [oidores], who will also be judges of criminal cases [alcaldes del crimen]; a crown attorney [fiscal]; a bailiff [alguacil mayor]; a lieutenant of the Gran Chancellor; and the other necessary ministers and officials; and which shall have for district said Island of Luzon, and the rest of the Philippines, the Archipelago of China, and its Mainland, discovered and to be discovered. And we order that the governor and captain general of said Islands and Provinces, and president of their Royal Audiencia, have exclusively the superior government of the entire district of said Audiencia in war and peace, and shall make provisions and favors in our Royal Name, which in conformity to the laws of this Compilation and the rest of the Kingdoms of Castile and the instructions and powers that We shall grant, he should and can do; and in gubernatorial matters and cases that shall arise, that are of importance, said president-governor should consult on them with the judges of said Audiencia, so that they give their consultive opinions, and having heard them, he should provide the most convenient to the service of God and ours and the peace and tranquility of said Province and Republic".

=== Territories ===
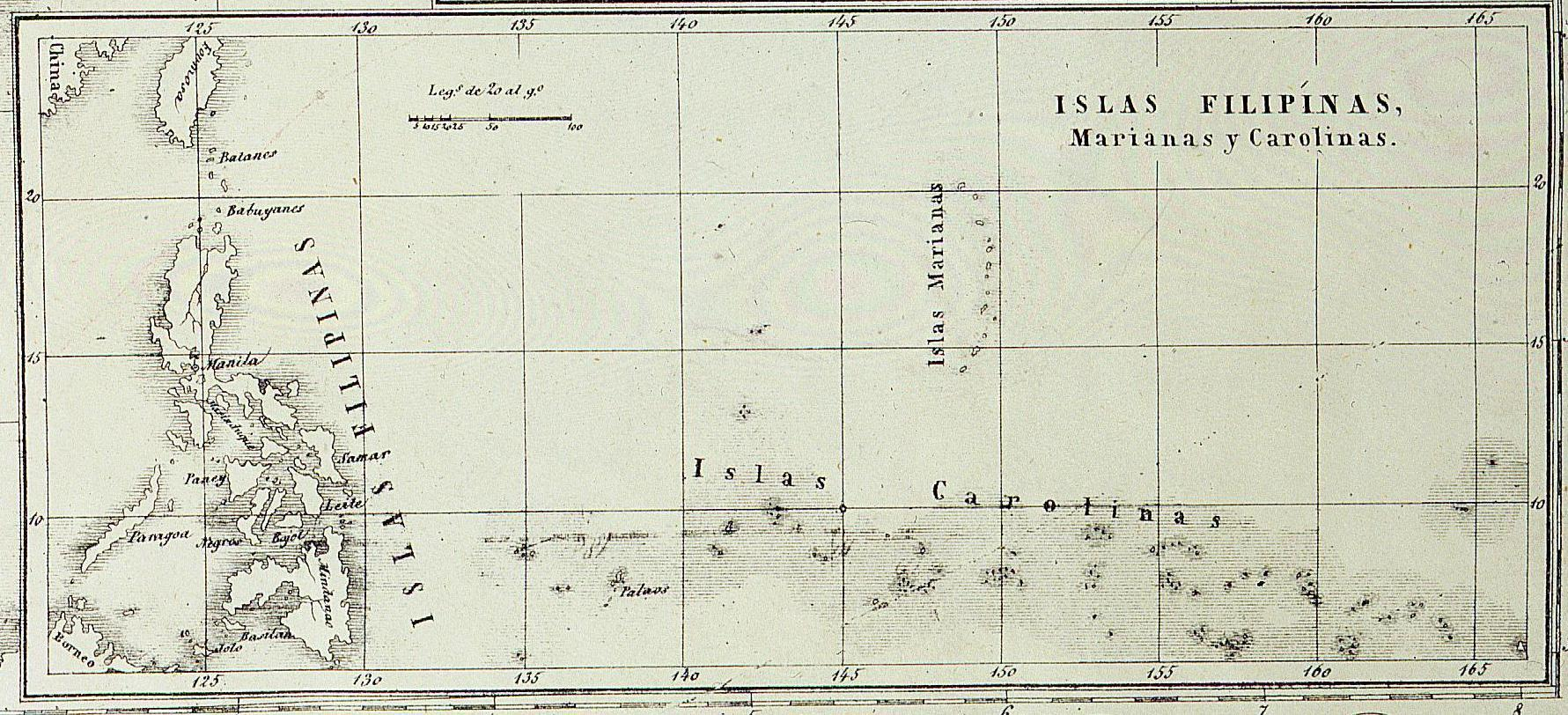
The Spanish Empire's "Islas Filipínas, Marianas y Carolinas" under the Spanish East Indies Captaincy General based in Manila and other formerly planned and former possessions and adjacent islands. 1858, Fragment.

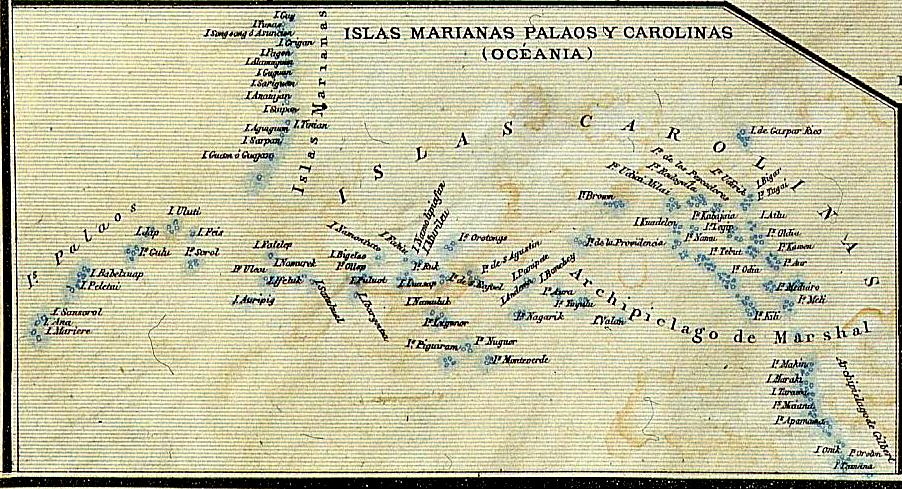
1888 map showing the Spanish East Indies, including Palau Islands (map without Philippines)

The Spanish East Indies came to be defined as:

- Las Islas Filipinas (became the Republic of the Philippines): Manila, Luzon, the Visayas, Palawan, Balambangan Island, Northern Mindanao, Zamboanga, Basilan, Jolo, Palmas Islands, Spratly Islands; including isolated outposts in Keelung, Taiwan, and in the islands of Gilolo, Ternate, and Tidore in the Maluku Islands and Manado in Northern part of Sulawesi (formerly Celebes).
- Islas Carolinas (the Federated States of Micronesia)
- Islas Marianas (Commonwealth of the Northern Mariana Islands and the United States Territory of Guam)
- Islas Palaos (Republic of Palau)

The timeline of the territories ruled by Spain included:

- the Captaincy General of the Philippines (1565–1898) (the Philippines).
- Palau (1574–1899).
- the Marianas (1667–1898 or 1899) (Guam and Northern Mariana Islands).
- the Carolines (Nuevas Filipinas) (1686–1899) (the Federated States of Micronesia).
- the Marshall Islands (1874-1885).
- parts of Formosa (Taiwan) (1626–1642).
- parts of Sulawesi (Celebes) and of the Moluccas (Maluku Islands) (1580–1663) (parts of Indonesia).

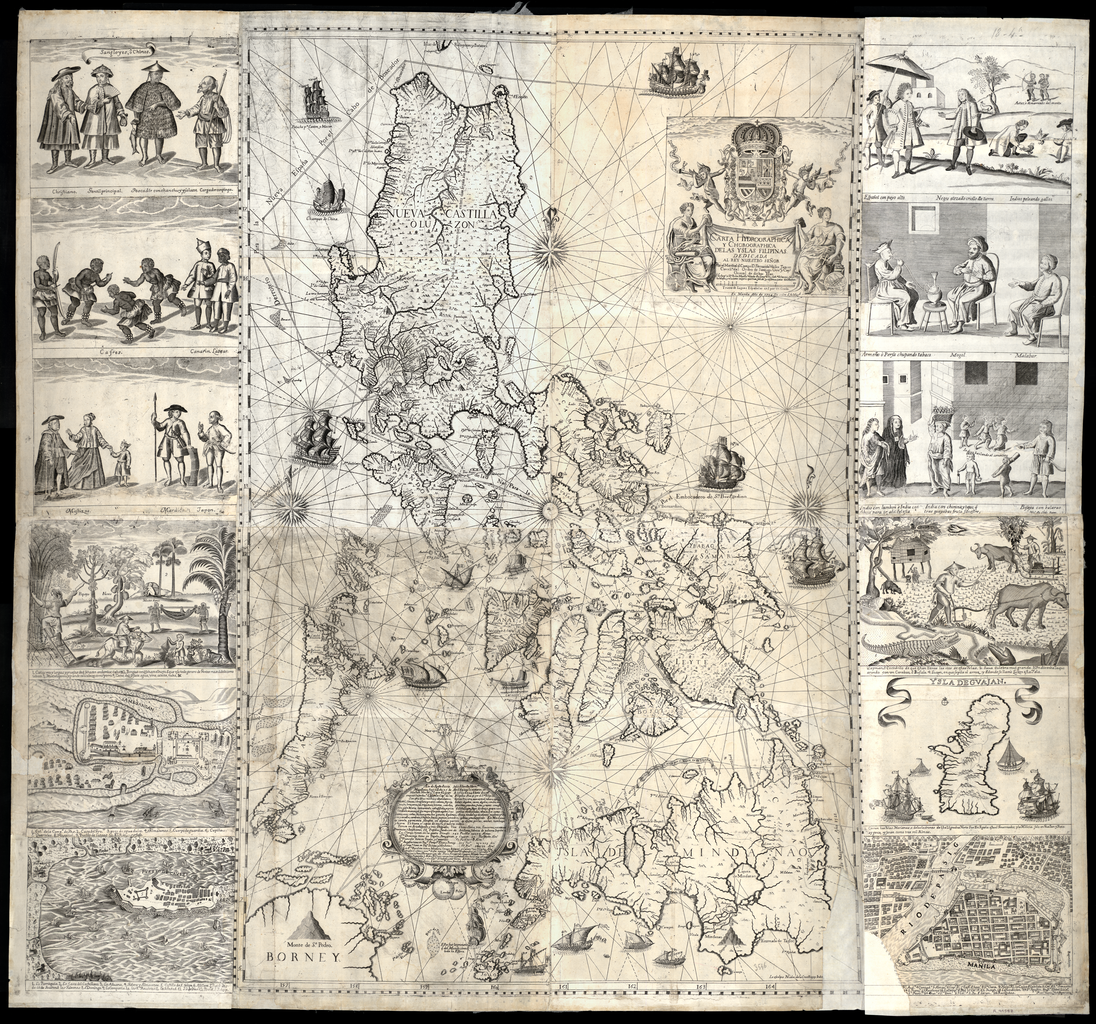
The Murillo Velarde Map (Carta Hydrographica y Chorographica de las Yslas Filipinas Dedicada al Rey Nuestro Señor por el Mariscal d. Campo D. Fernando Valdes Tamon Cavallº del Orden de Santiago de Govor. Y Capn), (Manila, 1734)

The Spaniards used several names that are not currently used. Gran Moluca (Great Molluccas) for the island of Mindanao and Nueva Castilla (New Castile) for Luzon.

Because Spanish interest in the region was primarily focused on its use as a base for trade with East Asia, direct Spanish control over the area expanded slowly. The Batanes Islands were conquered in the 18th century by José Basco. The highlands of Luzon remained outside Spanish control until the early 19th century, and the southernmost tip of Palawan, not until the late 1890s. The rest of Mindanao (Caesarea Karoli)—aside from outposts in Northern Mindanao, Zamboanga, Cotabato, and the islands of Basilan and Jolo, the rest was nominally under Spanish control, recognizing Spanish rule, but left to administer their own affairs, as in the cases of the Sulu, and the Maguindanao sultanates, as well as a number of other Lumad tribes not affiliated with either. Similarly, Palau and the vast majority of the Caroline Islands were not governed by Spanish missions until the early 19th century.

== Cultural influence in the former Spanish East Indies ==
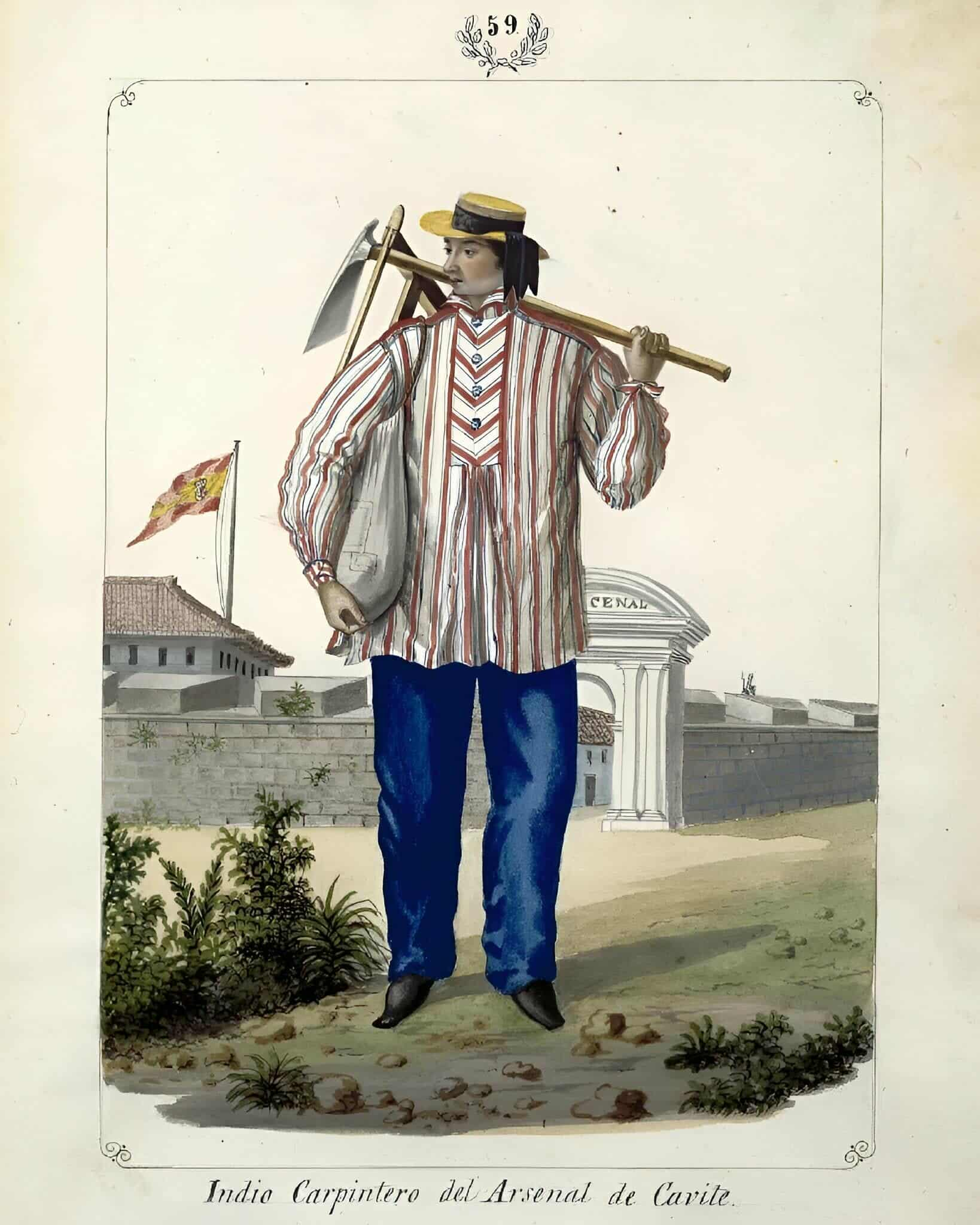
Native arsenal carpenter of Cavite.

=== Spanish ===
Spain's influence on its former territories in Asia-Pacific is significant to this day. The majority of the people of the Philippines, Guam and the Mariana Islands belong to the Catholic faith which was introduced by Spanish missionaries in the 16th and 17th centuries. A large part of the population in these countries were forced to use Spanish names and surnames, many of which are still in use. Also, because of the introduction of new tools, products, crops and technology by Spaniards in the three centuries of colonial rule, many Spanish loanwords entered the native languages of these countries. Art forms such as music, architecture and fashion also have much Spanish influence. The national cuisines of these countries also have several Spanish elements.

=== Filipino ===
A sizeable proportion of the current population of the Northern Mariana Islands (45–55%) and Guam (30–45%), as well as that of Palau (15–25%) is of Filipino descent. Some of the local peoples in the previously stated territories also use Filipino names and surnames (one example is the surname Pangelinan, which comes from the Filipino surname Pangilinan). The current Chamorro population is believed to be partly of Filipino descent, both because of the historic links between Guam, the Northern Mariana Islands and the Philippines during Spanish rule, and currently through different waves of migration. The cuisines of Guam, the Northern Mariana Islands, and Palau are also heavily influenced by Filipino cuisine, with dishes like pancit, lumpia, kelaguen, halo-halo, and okoy being the most noticeable.

== See also ==
- Spanish Filipino
- Spanish protectorate in Cambodia
- Dutch East Indies

== Bibliography ==
- Cunningham, Charles Henry (1919). Stephens, H. Morse; Bolton, Herbert E. (eds.). The Audiencia in the Spanish Colonies as illustrated by the Audiencia of Manila (1583–1800) (Project Gutenberg). Publications in History. Berkeley: University of California Press. OCLC 19679822.
- Phelan, John Leddy (1959). The Hispanization of the Philippines: Spanish Aims and Filipino Responses, 1565–1700. Madison: University of Wisconsin Press. ASIN B0007DMLSE.
