= Spanish Formosa =

Spanish colony from 1626 to 1642

Spanish Formosa Gobernación de Formosa Española (Spanish) 西屬艾爾摩沙 (Chinese)
- 1626–1642
- Flag

- The locations of Spanish Formosa, overlapping a map of the present-day island. Spanish Possessions Dutch possessions Kingdom of Middag
- Status: Territory of the Spanish East Indies (colony)
- Capital: San Salvador (Keelung)
- Official languages: Spanish
- Common languages: East Formosan languages • Hokkien
- Religion: Roman Catholicism
- Historical era: Age of Discovery
  - Established: 1626
  - Surrender of San Salvador: 1642
- Currency: Spanish real
| Preceded by | Succeeded by |
| Prehistory of Taiwan | Dutch Formosa |
- Today part of: Republic of China (Taiwan)

Spanish Formosa (Spanish: Gobernación de Formosa Española) was a small colony of the Spanish Empire established in the northern tip of the island now known as Taiwan, then known to Europeans at the time as Formosa or to Spaniards as "Isla Hermosa" from 1626 to 1642. It was ceded to the Dutch Republic during the Eighty Years' War.

The Portuguese were the first Europeans to reach the island in 1544, and named it Formosa (Portuguese for "beautiful") due to the beautiful landscape as seen from the sea. The Spanish had translated the name into Spanish as "Hermosa" and is what was historically used in Spanish maps and documents about the colony.

The Spanish set up a colony in the north of the island in 1626 as part of the Manila-based Spanish East Indies that was also subordinated to New Spain (Mexico) at that time. As a Spanish colony, it was meant to protect the regional trade of Spanish Philippines, especially Manila-bound junk ships coming from Ming China and Japan from interference by the Dutch in Dutch Formosa in the south of the island. The colony was short-lived due to the loss of its strategic importance and unwillingness by Spanish authorities in Manila to commit more resources to its defense. After seventeen years, the last fortress of the Spanish was besieged by Dutch forces and eventually fell, giving the Dutch control over much of the island.

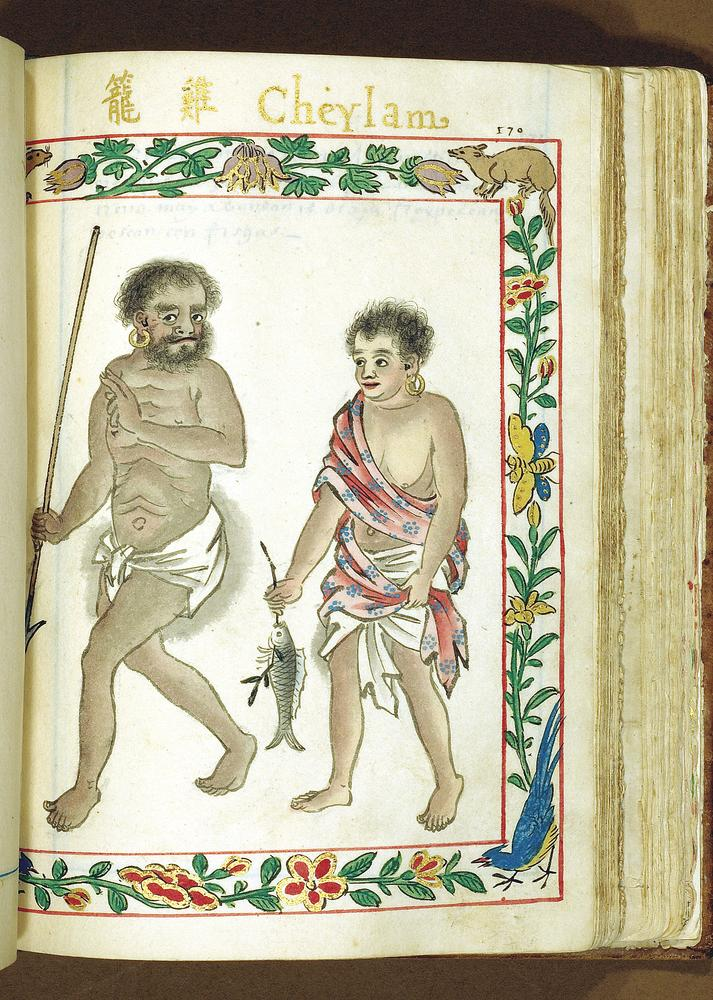
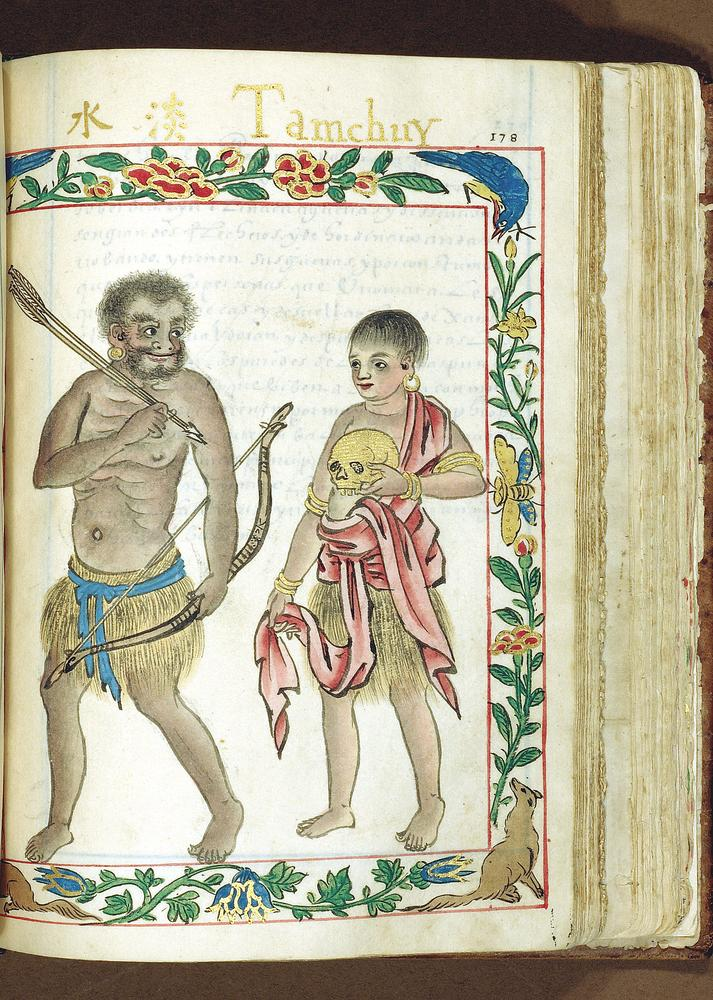
Indigenous Formosans (Likely Basay) in Keelung and Tamsui observed in Spanish Formosa via Boxer Codex (circa 1590)

Spanish Catholic friar missionaries, especially Dominicans and Franciscans, Christianized about 5,000 indigenous Formosans, mostly the Basay people in Keelung and Tamsui and the Kavalan people in Yilan, during the time of the Spanish governorate. The Spanish also settled Sangley Chinese and a few Christian Japanese in Chinese trading settlements (Parián) as traders and laborers and employed at least 300 or more native Filipinos (especially Kapampangan), Mexican Mestizos, Mulattos, Blacks, Mexican Amerindians, and some Mexican Criollo Spaniards from New Spain (Mexico) and Spanish Filipinos from Spanish Philippines as soldiers, laborers, and friar missionaries garrisoned in the forts and settlements of Spanish Formosa.

== History ==
=== Background ===
In 1566, the Dutch rose up against Spanish rule in the Habsburg Netherlands. The Dutch and their allies, England and France, attacked Spain's overseas colonies as part of the Eighty Years' War. The Spanish cut the Dutch rebels off from the spice trade based in Lisbon, making it necessary for the Dutch to send their own expeditions to the sources of these commodities to take control of the much desired spice trade in the East Indies.

As a result of the Iberian Union of Portugal and Spain in 1580, the Dutch of the Seventeen Provinces fought the Dutch–Portuguese War. England and France became enemies of both Portugal and Spain. The Dutch colonisation of Formosa was part of the unsuccessful campaign to seize the possessions of the Spanish Habsburgs in Asia, including the Philippines. The Dutch began to attack a string of often undermanned coastal fortresses that comprised the Habsburg's Portuguese African and Asian possessions. The settlements were sometimes isolated, difficult to reinforce if attacked, and prone to being picked off one by one. However, the Dutch were mostly unsuccessful in these attempts.

Pursuing their quest for alternative routes to Asia for trade, the first Dutch privateer squadron to reach the Philippines on 14 December 1600 was led by pirate Olivier van Noort. The Dutch sought to dominate the commercial sea trade in Southeast Asia, often engaging in piracy and privateering. They attempted to disrupt trade by harassing the coasts of Manila Bay and its environs, and preyed on sampans and junks from China and Japan trading at Manila. In the context of this competition for trade, the Dutch established a colony at Tayouan, present-day Anping, in the south of Formosa. From there they tried threaten Spain's trade in the region. As a counter to this threat, the Spanish colonial authorities in Manila decided to establish their own colony in the north of the island.

=== The early years (1626–1629) ===
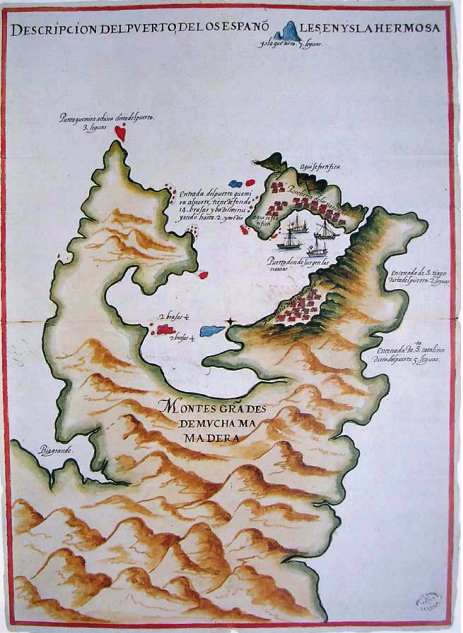
Spanish Map of Keelung and Tamsui Harbor, 1626

Landing at Cape Santiago in the north-east of Formosa but finding it unsuitable for defensive purposes, the Spanish continued westwards along the coast until they arrived at Keelung. A deep and well-protected harbour plus a small island in the mouth of the harbour made it the ideal spot to build the first settlement, which they named Santissima Trinidad. Forts were built, both on the island and in the harbour itself.

In 1629 the Spanish erected a second base, centred on Fort Santo Domingo, in Tamsui.

=== First battle with the Dutch ===
In 1641, the Spanish colony in the north had become such an irritant to the Dutch in the south that they decided to take northern Formosa by force. In courteous terms, the Dutch governor, Paulus Traudenius, informed the Spanish governor of their intentions.

Sir,
I have the honor to communicate to you that I have received the command of a considerable naval and military force with the view of making me master by civil means or otherwise of the fortress Santissima Trinidad in the isle of Ke-lung of which your Excellency is the Governor.
In accordance with the usages of Christian nations to make known their intentions before commencing hostilities, I now summon your Excellency to surrender. If your Excellency is disposed to lend an ear to the terms of capitulation which we offer and make delivery to me of the fortress of Santissima Trinidad and other citadels, your Excellency and your troops will be treated in good faith according to the usages and customs of war, but if your Excellency feigns to be deaf to this command there will be no other remedy than recourse to arms. I hope that your Excellency will give careful consideration to the contents of this letter and avoid the useless effusion of blood, and I trust that without delay and in a few words you will make known to me your intentions.
May God protect your Excellency many years,
The Friend of your Excellency,
PAULUS TRAUDENIUS

The Spanish governor was not inclined to give in so easily and replied in kind.

Sir; I have duly received your communication of 26 August, and in response I have the honor to point out to you that as becomes a good Christian who recalls the oath he has made before his king, I cannot and will not surrender the forts demanded by your Excellency, as I and my garrison have determined to defend them. I am accustomed to find myself before great armies, and I have engaged in numerous battles in Flanders as well as other countries, and so I beg of you not to take the trouble of writing me further letters of like tenor. May each one defend himself as best he can. We are Spanish Christians and God in whom we trust is our protector.
May the Lord have mercy on you.
Written in our principal fortress San Salvador the 6 September 1641.
GONSALO PORTILIS

Subsequently, the Dutch launched an assault on the northern regions held by the Spanish, but the positions were well-defended and the attacking troops were not able to breach the walls of the fortresses. They returned, thwarted and humiliated, to the Dutch base at Fort Zeelandia.

=== Surrender to the Dutch ===
In 1642, the Spanish governor in Manila recalled most of his Formosa troops for an expedition in the Philippines. In August that year, to profit from the relatively undefended Spanish position, the Dutch returned to Keelung with four large ships, several smaller ships, and approximately 369 Dutch soldiers. A combination of Spaniards, Americans, Formosan natives, and Kapampangan from the Philippines attempted to hold off the larger Dutch force. After six days of battle, the small force surrendered the fort and was returned to Manila defeated, giving up their flags and what little artillery that had remained with them. Sebastián Hurtado de Corcuera, governor-general of the Philippines, was blamed for the loss of Formosa and was eventually tried in court for his actions. Upon conviction, he was imprisoned for five years in the Philippines. Historians since Corcuera's time have chastised him for the loss of the settlement in Formosa but other factors, such as the limited military resources available for the defence of the remote territory, played a role in the loss.

== Government ==
Formosa was a governorate. The governor reported to the captain general in Manila. The captain general's superior was the viceroy of New Spain in Mexico City, who, in turn, was appointed by the king of Spain.

The governors of Formosa were:

- Antonio Carreño Valdés, 1626–1629
- Juan de Alcarazo, 1629–1632
- Bartolomé Díaz Barrera, 1632–1634
- Alonso García Romero, 1634–1635
- Francisco Hernández, 1635–1637
- Pedro Palomino, 1637–1639
- Cristóbal Márquez, 1639–1640
- Gonzalo Portillo, 1640–1642

== See also ==
- Dutch Formosa
- Kingdom of Middag
- Kingdom of Tungning
- Spanish expedition to Formosa

== Bibliography ==
- Davidson, James W. (1903). The Island of Formosa, Past and Present: History, People, Resources, and Commercial Prospects: Tea, Camphor, Sugar, Gold, Coal, Sulphur, Economical Plants, and Other Productions. London and New York: Macmillan. OCLC 1887893. OL 6931635M.
