= Basay =

Basay may refer to:

- Basay, Negros Oriental, Philippines
- Basay language, an extinct East Formosan language
- Basay people, an ethnic group in Taiwan
- Ivo Basay (born 1966), Chilean footballer

== See also ==
- Basai
- Basey
- Bazay
