= Kavalan =

Kavalan may refer to:

- Kavalan people, an indigenous people of Taiwan
- Kavalan language, formerly spoken by the Kavalan people
- Kavalan Distillery, a whisky distillery in Taiwan

== See also ==
- Kaavalan, a 2011 Tamil-language Indian film
