= Qauqaut people =

Aboriginal ethnic group of northeastern Taiwan

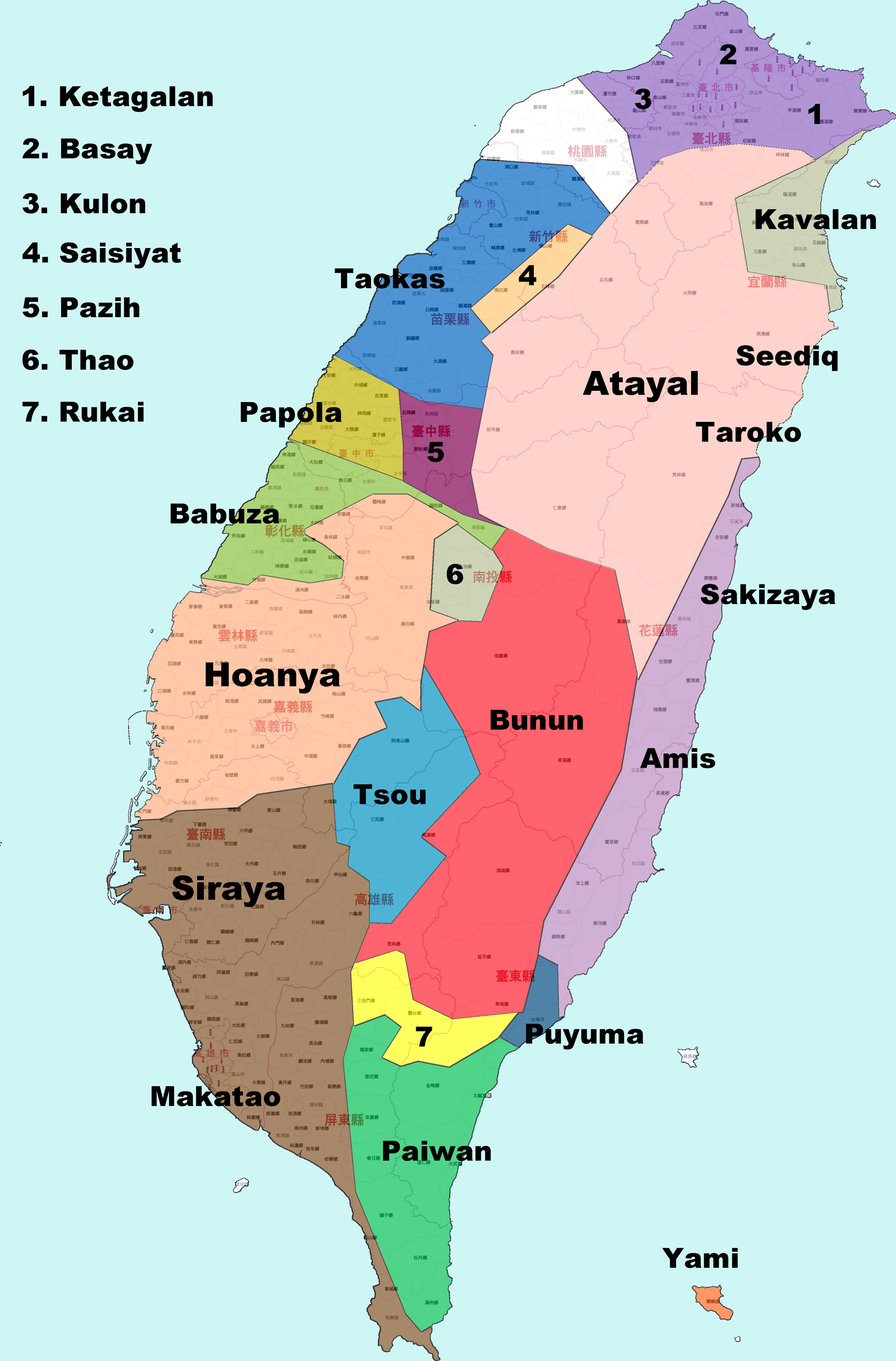
Qauqaut people live in northeastern Taiwan, within the Kavalan people area.

The Qauqaut (Chinese: 猴猴族; pinyin: Hóuhóuzú) were a Taiwanese Indigenous people who lived primarily in the town of Su-ao in Yilan County. They spoke the Basay language, which is a Kavalanic language, an Austronesian language family of Taiwan. According to Japanese anthropologist Inō Kanori, the Qauqaut people had been assimilated by the Kavalan people by early 20th century. The Qauqaut people are not recognised by the government of Taiwan.

According to oral tradition from various Atayal villages, the Qauqaut originally settled in the middle portion of the Takiri River (Wade–Giles: Liwuhsi). In the mid-1700s, following pressure from Atayals, they moved to the east coast down the Takiri. Later, some moved north to Langsu in Nan'ao.

Early modern Chinese documents on the Kavalan territories reported that the Qauqaut were linguistically and culturally distinct from the other Formosan ethnic groups and that they did not intermarry with the other communities.

Taiwanese linguist Paul Jen-kuei Li hypothesised that, in about 200 BCE, the Qauqaut migrated from Southeast Asia to the Marshall Islands and the Caroline Islands and in around 1000 AD arrived on the east coast of Taiwan, based on his linguistic comparison with the nearby Taroko (Seediq) language of Taiwan, which he said varies greatly from the Qauqaut. This contrasts with the rest of the Taiwanese aborigines, who are said to have arrived on the island much earlier.

The Qauqaut bury the dead in a sitting position, like those of neighbouring villages in southern Kavalan territory.

== See also ==
- Demographics of Taiwan
- Taiwanese indigenous peoples

== Works cited ==
- Li, Paul Jen-kuei 李壬癸 (2004) [paper originally published 1995]. "Formosan vs. Non-Formosan Features in Some Austronesian Languages in Taiwan" (PDF). Selected Papers on Formosan Languages / Táiwān nándǎo yǔyán lùnwén xuǎnjí Selected Papers on Formosan Languages / 台灣南島語言論文選集. Vol. 2. Taipei: Institute of Linguistics, Academia Sinica / Zhongyang yanjiuyuan yuyanxue yanjiusuo. pp. 953–975. ISBN 957-01-8413-2. Archived from the original (PDF) on 2021-12-01.
