= Basay people =

Ethnic group in Taiwan

Basay
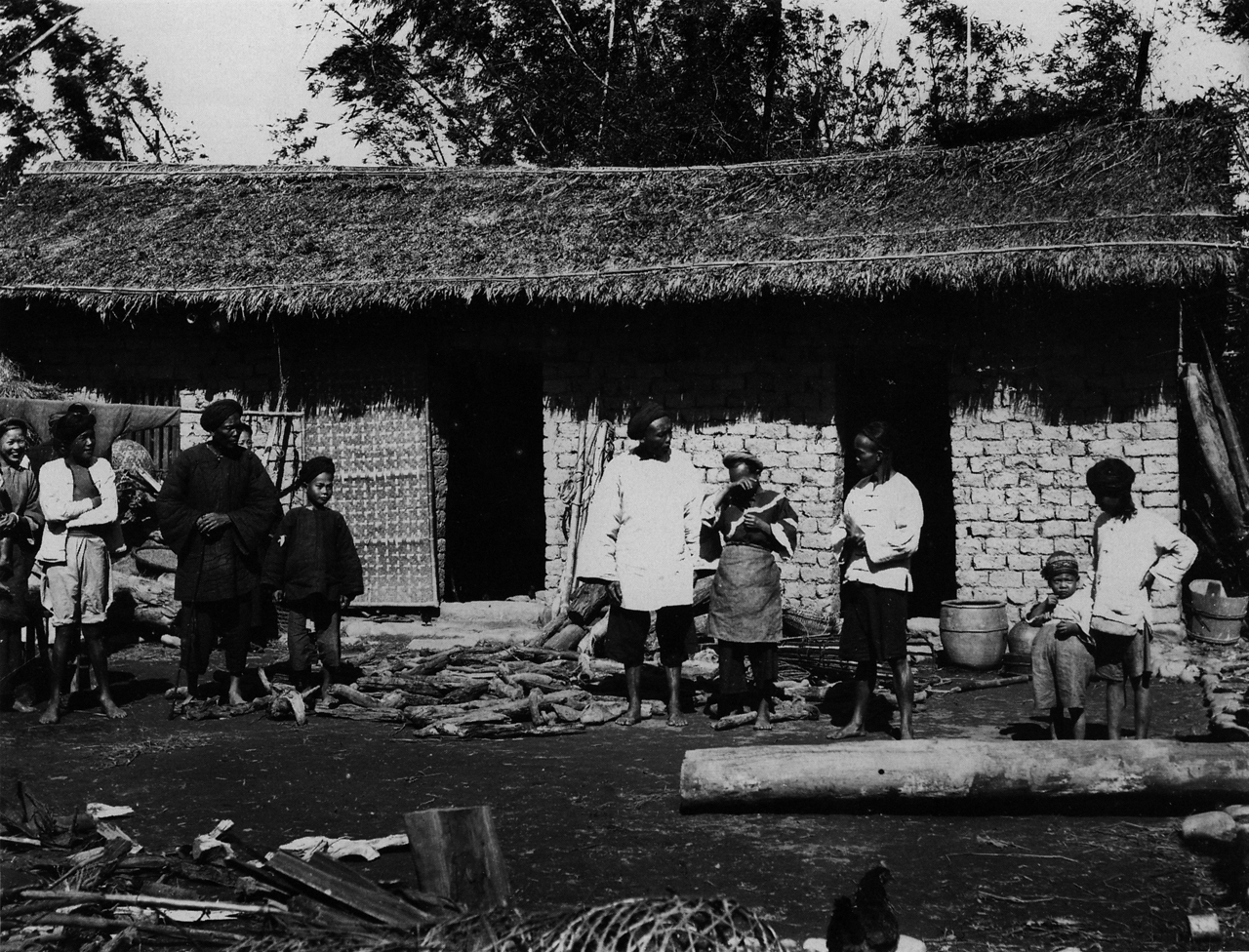

Total population
- 1,000~3,000

Regions with significant populations
- Northern Taiwan

Languages
- Basay (formerly), Mandarin, Taiwanese

Religion
- Buddhism, Animism

Related ethnic groups
- Other Taiwanese Aborigines; Especially Qauqaut and Kavalan

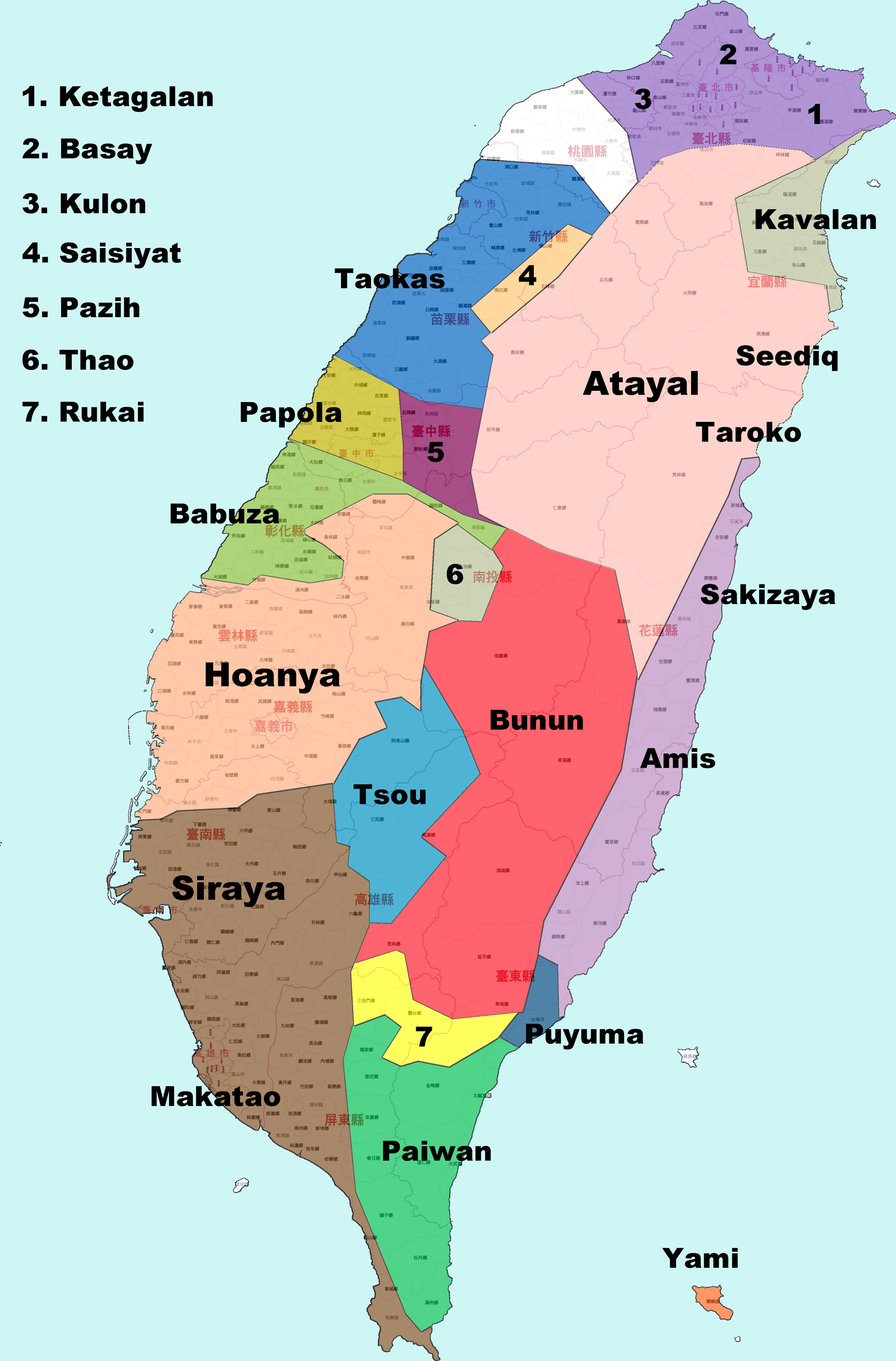
Basay people live in northern Taiwan.

The Basay are an aboriginal people of Taiwan. Their ancestors spoke the Basay language.

== History ==
During the 1600s, the Basay people monopolized control over river and costal trading in North Formosa. Basay traders were vital suppliers of information and goods to Dutch East India Company garrisons. They were also involved in coal and iron mining during this time.

== See also ==
- Formosan languages
- Taiwanese indigenous peoples
