= Basay language =

Extinct Formosan language of northern Taiwan

Basay
- Ketagalan
- Native to: Taiwan
- Ethnicity: Basay, Qauqaut
- Extinct: mid-20th century
- Language family: Austronesian: East Formosan; Kavalanic; Basay
- Dialects: Basay proper; Trobiawan; Linaw–Qauqaut

Language codes
- ISO 639-3: byq
- Glottolog: basa1287
- Linguasphere: 30-BAA-a
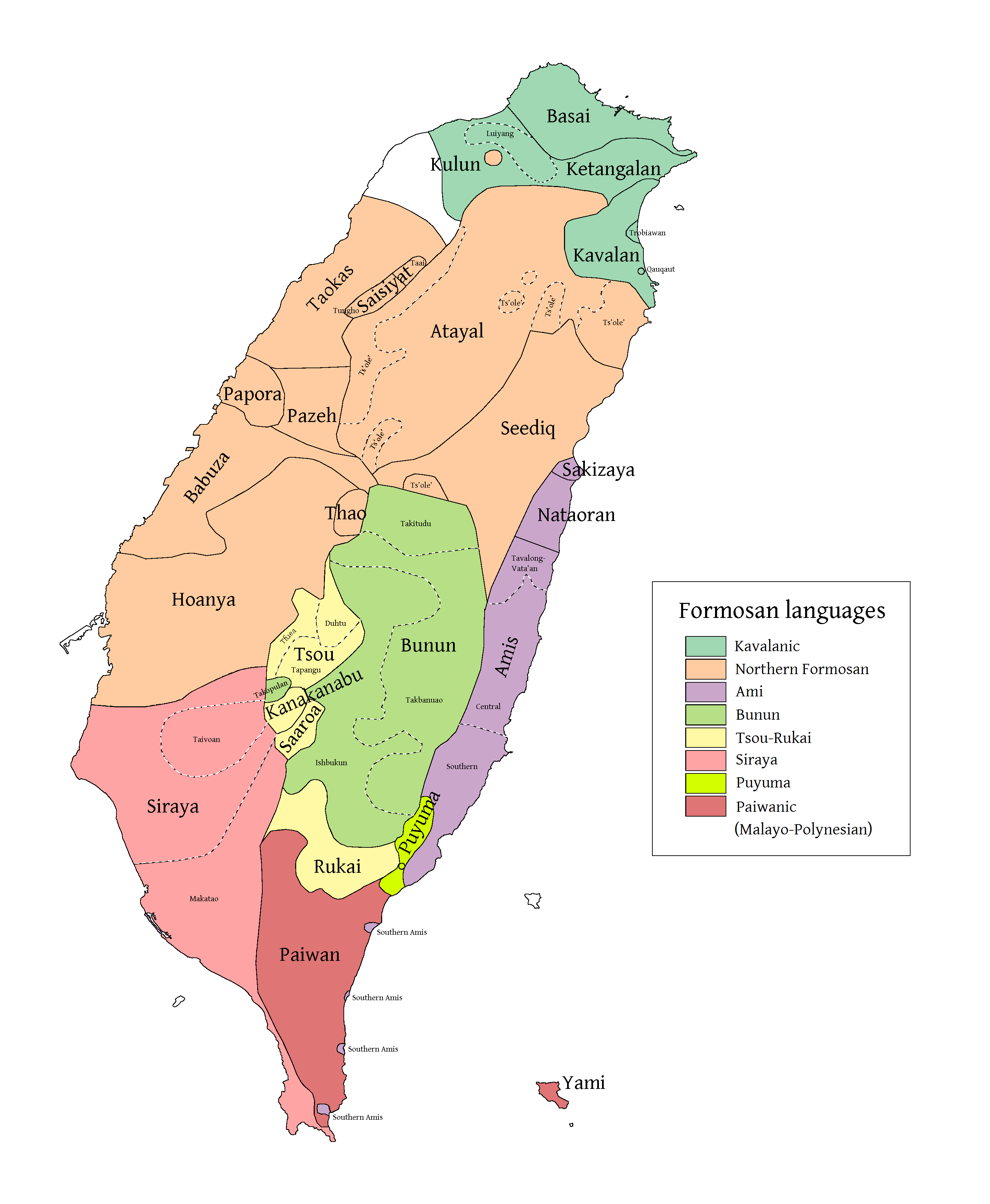
- (dark green, north) The Kavalanic languages: Basai, Ketagalan, and Kavalan

Basay was a Formosan language spoken around modern-day Taipei in northern Taiwan by the Basay, Qauqaut, and Trobiawan peoples. Trobiawan, Linaw, and Qauqaut were other dialects (see East Formosan languages).

Basay data is mostly available from Erin Asai's 1936 field notes, which were collected from an elderly Basay speaker in Shinshe, Taipei, as well as another one in Yilan who spoken the Trobiawan dialect. However, the Shinshe informant's speech was heavily influenced by Taiwanese, and the Trobiawan informant, named Ipai, had heavy Kavalan influence in her speech.

Li (1992) mentions four Basaic languages: Basay, Luilang, Nankan, Puting. Nankan and Puting are close to Kavalan, whereas Luilang is divergent.

== Syntax ==
There are four optional case markers in Basay.

- a – nominative, ligature (Shinshe dialect)
- ta – nominative (Trobiawan dialect)
- li – locative (Shinshe dialect)
- u – oblique (Trobiawan dialect)

Some function words include:

- pai 'future'

Trobiawan negators include:

- mia 'not' (Shinshe dialect: mayu 'not (yet)')
- asi 'don't' (Shinshe dialect: manai 'don't')
- (m)upa 'not to want'
- (Shinshe dialect: kualau 'not exist')

Yes–no questions are marked by u ~ nu.

== Morphology ==
Basay verbs, like Kavalan verbs, distinguish between agent-focus (AF) and patient-focus (PF) verbs. The perfective prefixes na- and ni- are allomorphs.

Basay Focus System
Type of prefix	Neutral	Perfective	Future
Agentive focus (AF)	-um-, m-	na-mi-	-um- ... -a, m- ... -a
Patient focus (PF)	–	ni-	-au
Locative focus (LF)	-an	ni- ... -an	-ai

== Pronouns ==
The Basay pronouns below are from Li (1999).

Basay Personal Pronouns
			Neutral	Nominative	Genitive	Oblique
1st person	singular		yaku	kaku, -ku	maku-, -aku; naku, -ak	yakuan, kuan, kuanan
1st person	plural	excl.	yami	-mi	yami, -ami; nami, -am	yamian, mian, mianan
1st person	plural	incl.	mita	kita, -ita	mita, -ita; nita, -ta	... , ... , tianan
2nd person	singular		isu	kisu, -su	misu, -isu; nisu, -su ~ -is	isuan, suan, isuanan, suanan
2nd person	plural		imu	kimu, -mu	-imu; nimu, -im	imuan, ... , imuanan
3rd person	singular		–	-ia	–	–
3rd person	plural		–	-ia	–	–

== Revival ==
Based in part on recordings and field notes made by Asai Erin in 1936, classes teaching Basay were offered in Taiwan starting in 2025.
