= Spanish protectorate in Cambodia =

Vassal state of the Spanish Empire

- Flag of the spanish protectorate Phillip II coat of arms

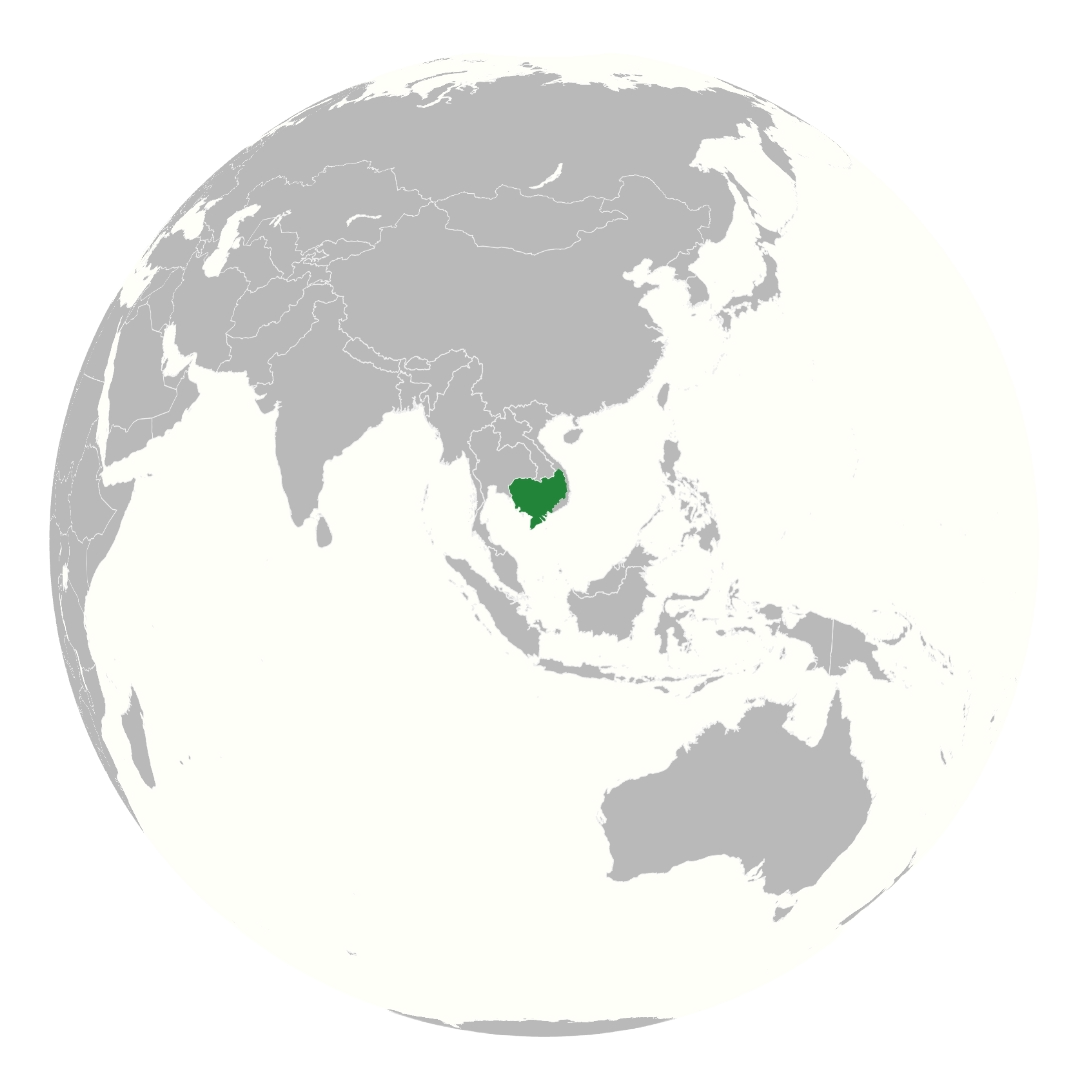
- Map of Spanish protectorate in Cambodia show all world.

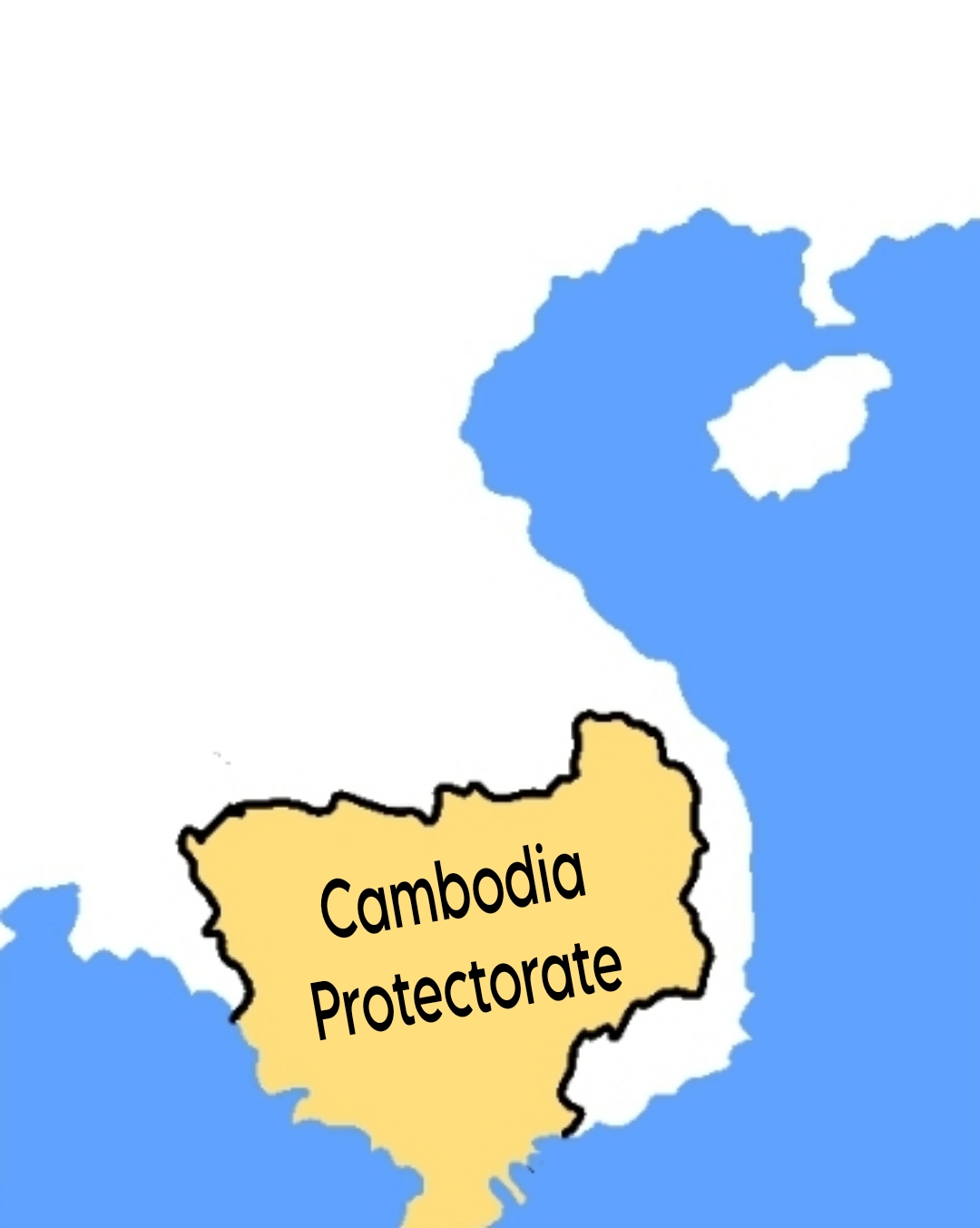
- Map of Spanish protectorate in Cambodia.
- Capital: Longvek, Srey Santhor
- Other languages: Khmer and Spanish
- Religion: Christianity
- Government: Diogo Veloso
  - 1593–1597: Satha I
  - 1598–1599: Barom Reachea II

Establishment
  - Battle of Cape Paracel: 1591
  - Cambodian–Spanish War: 1593-1597; 1599
  - Fall of Longvek: 1594 February
  - Barom Reachea II death: 1599
- Today part of: Cambodia, Vietnam

The Spanish Protectorate in Cambodia was a vassal state of the Spanish Empire briefly controlled from 1593 to 1599. This territory came under Spanish domination following the Spanish–Cambodian War, in which Spanish conquerors supported Cambodian King Barom Reachea II during Cambodia’s internal conflicts in the Cambodian Dark Ages. King Reachea II accepted the condition of becoming a vassal and tributary of Spain after being appointed monarch, but both the king and his foreign supporters were killed by Malay Muslims two years after the protectorate was established.

== History ==
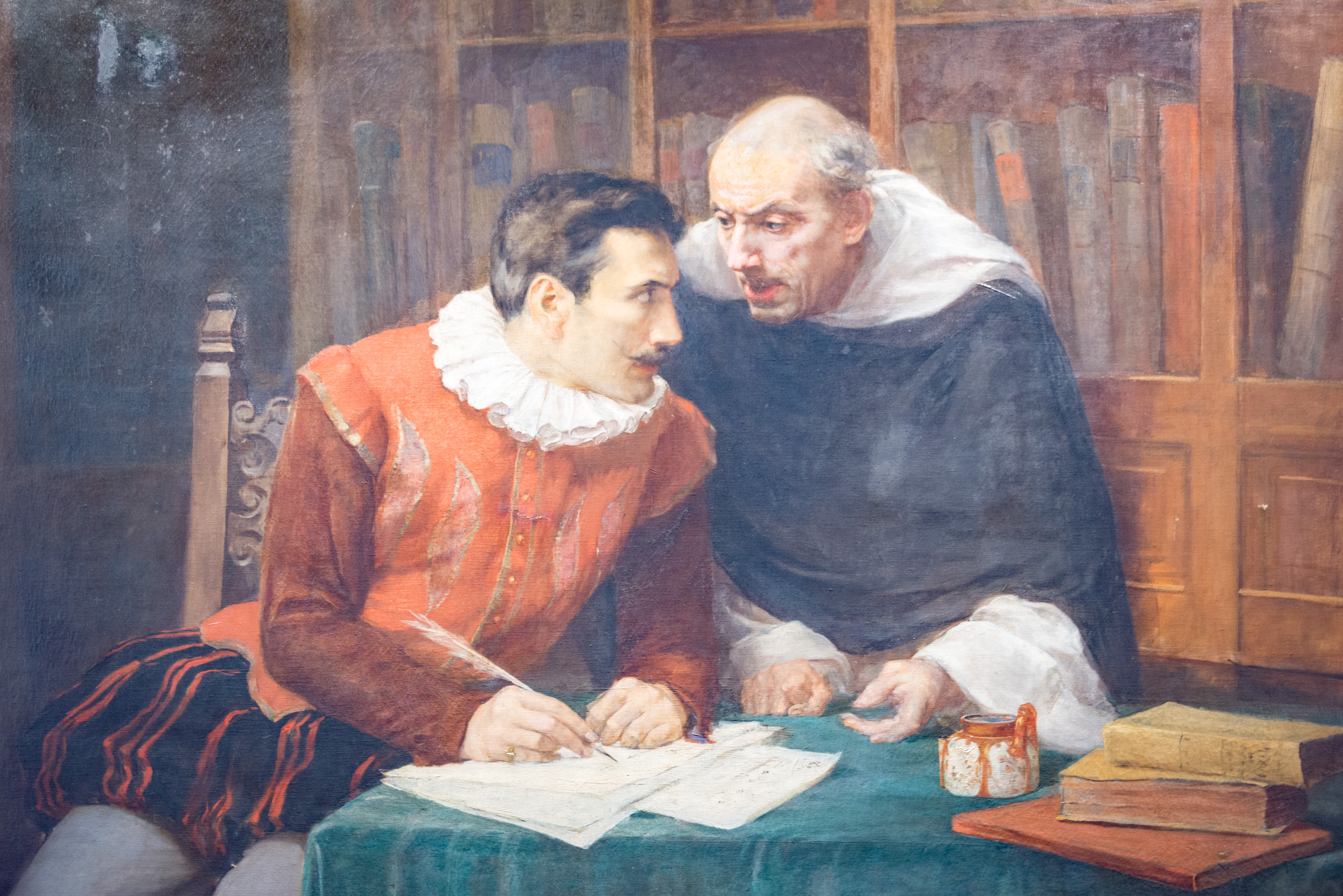
In 1896, the accomplished Filipino painter Félix Resurrección Hidalgo completed his painting featuring Luis Perez Dasmariñas, who governed the Philippines between 1593 and 1596 and Fray Domingo de Salazar, a Dominican friar who was the 1st Bishop of Manila serving 1581 to 1584. Here they are said to be discussing the dispatch of a military expedition to free the Kingdom of Cambodia from Siamese invaders, and thereby gain a Spanish foothold in mainland Asia.

the Captaincy General of the Philippines, Governor of the Philippines Santiago de Vera informed Philip II of Spain, Philip II that the King of Cambodia had requested Spanish aid since the Kingdom of Ayutthaya was constantly carrying out military attacks against the Khmer Empire, which constantly threatened the territorial integrity of the Cambodian Empire. In 1592, at Cambodia's request for military assistance, the explorers and conquistadors Blas Ruiz de Hernán González and Diogo Veloso arrived in the Khmer Empire, both summoned by the Spanish Monarchy to participate in a large series of military operations on Cambodian soil. They began their journey in Cambodia, where they met King Satha I. After a prolonged war with the Burmese, the Ayutthaya Empire under King Naresuanl began to reconquer the Khmer territories around Battambang and Pursat in 1591, beginning a new war on Cambodian soil. Blocked, the Siamese fought off another Burmese invasion and returned in 1593. Outflanked at Pursat, the Khmer army retreated to Babaur in Kampong Chhnang, which was then surrounded.

The Cambodian prince Soryopor, uncle of King Chey Chettha, managed to break out of the siege with 1,000 men, while the rest of the defending force perished. After arriving at Longveek, Servopor assumed direct command of the defenses since his brother had already abandoned the city. With the help of mercenaries, Spanish people, and Portuguese people, Servopor reinforced the walls with cannons and spikes and sent messages of help to the xietnamites and the Spanish governor in Manila. The remnants of the Cambodian navy were defeated and the invading forces besieged Longvek, beginning a siege. Siamese engineers built earthworks higher than the city walls and began firing on Longvek. Then, the defenders built a second wall for protection. On January 3, 1594, after an hour of artillery preparation, Naresuan's army stormed into the city using War Elephants to break through the city gates. 90,000 Cambodians, including Prince Soroypor, were taken to Ayutthaya.

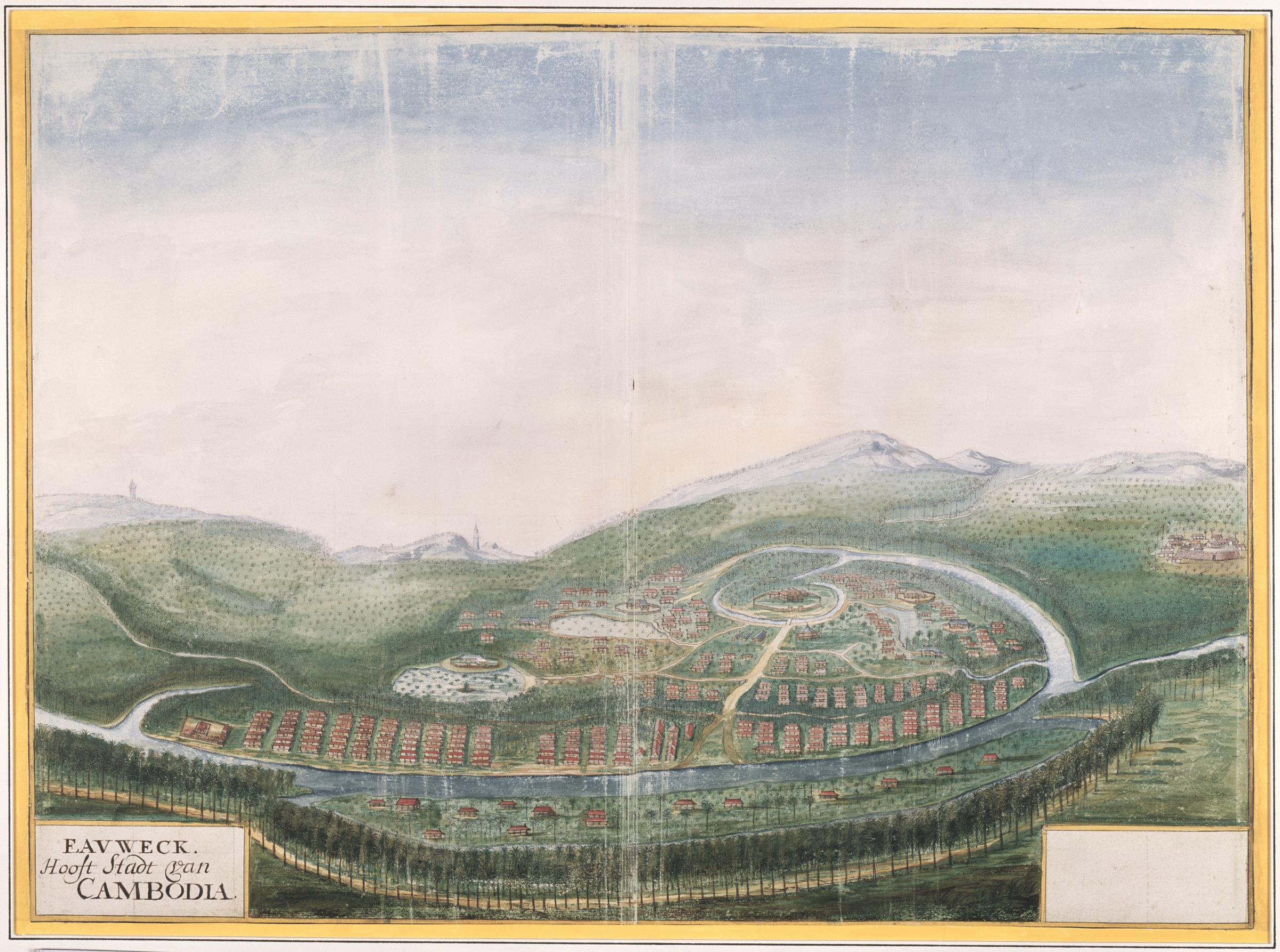
Bird's eye view of Longvek, Cambodia

After a voyage, the sailor Blas Ruiz was taken captive. The junk where the Spaniard was held prisoner suffered a mutiny among its crew, which was mostly made up of slaves and their masters. Finally, the Chinese overpowered the Siamese and murdered the mutineers. After this, Blas Ruiz, while watching the Chinese begin to kill each other over the division of the spoils, allied himself with the rest of the prisoners, among whom were several Japanese mercenaries. They organized a second mutiny, and the Japanese were convinced to head to Manila, where they would find refuge and a reward

Diego Veloso arrived in Siam on another ship and was released after claiming to be merely a merchant with casual business dealings in Longvek. He convinced the king to lead an expedition in search of Ruiz's missing ship and its loot. At sea, a storm devastated his escort. Despite the captain's sudden death, Veloso convinced the crew to press on, searching for the lost vessel. Eventually, the ship made for Malacca, where they were captured and the ship confiscated by the Portuguese authorities.

Following the Siamese victory, Spanish and Portuguese escapees from Cambodia arrived in the Philippines. Some, possibly Veloso and Ruiz, persuaded Governor Luis Pérez das Mariñas that unrest in Cambodia might benefit the Spanish crown

With the intention of Christianizing the region and opening a new route to China, three ships carrying 200 Spanish soldiers, both from the Iberian Peninsula and the Americas, along with Japanese and Filipino mercenaries and some missionary monks, were sent to Cambodia under the command of Suárez Gallinato. Blas Ruiz's ship was the only one to reach Cambodia. Veloso's ship was wrecked near the Mekong Delta, and Gallinato was forced to head for Malacca due to bad weather. Veloso finally rejoined Blas Ruiz near Chaktomuk (Phnom Penh) in March 1596.

=== The Attack on Preah Ram I and Proclamation of the Protectorate ===
Spanish Indochina.

As soon as the king was alerted by the Chinese community, he demanded the return of the ships and the presence of the Spanish captains at his palace. Fearing a trap, the captains did not attend the meeting and, after two days camped at the city gates, crossed into the royal residence during the night. With only forty Spaniards and twenty Japanese, they set fire to the storehouses, stormed the royal apartments, fired their muskets, and killed the king with a shot to the chest.

Some captains returned to Manila, while Ruiz and Veloso took the best ships, recruited locals, and looted the capital. They then continued their plan to go to Laos to find the legitimate king and restore him to Cambodia

In Laos, they discovered that Satha had died of a fever and that the heir was a twelve-year-old boy, Barom Reachea. The boy was assisted by a regency council composed of women, which the Europeans considered a weakness.

Ruiz and Veloso realized that winning the women's favor would give them more power over the boy. They convinced the royal family to return to Cambodia and escorted them to the capital. After the fighting, the country accepted the coronation of the boy king under the guardianship of his stepmother as regent, who also became Blas Ruiz's lover.

The king appointed Blas Ruiz and Diego Veloso as governors of Ba Phnum and Treang, respectively, under the new Spanish protectorate.

=== Decline ===
In 1598, the governor of the Philippines sent an expedition to Cambodia with two ships and two hundred soldiers, along with Catholic missionaries. Although the Khmer court initially received them well, due to Khmer mismanagement of the fleet, the soldiers were ambushed by an army of Malay and Chinese mercenaries. Veloso requested reinforcements, but Governor Pérez Dasmariñas refused, although he did send a group of volunteers and a Dominican friar with merchants to Longvek

Ruiz took advantage of the bad situation and went to court with a forged letter from the governor of Manila, demanding that the Cambodian king pay for services rendered to him and his men and give him land to build a fortress. The boy king apologized and authorized the construction of the fort. The Spanish contingent was on site finalizing preparations to begin construction of the new fort when Malaysian Muslim mercenaries attacked their camp. The boy king was killed by the Khmer rebels. The Spanish counterattacked and, in retaliation, stormed the capital, massacring the civilian population of Malays, Chinese, Khmer, Siamese, and Laotians in cosmopolitan Longvek. Fearing the construction of a Spanish fortress, which would make Europeans almost invincible behind stone walls and artillery, a coalition of Asian communities formed, armed themselves, and massacred all Westerners in the city, both military and religious, along with the Japanese. Only one Spaniard and a handful of Filipinos survived, while the whereabouts of Blas Ruiz and Veloso remained unknown.

=== Disintegration of the Protectorate ===
The Spanish defeat came at a time when the fortunes of the empire were beginning to change. Philip II died in 1598, and his son, Philip III, faced rebellions in all the empire's colonies.

Kaev Hua I officially ended the Spanish protectorate in 1600, the same year that his uncle, Soryopor, who had been imprisoned by the Siamese, returned to the country with the help of his former captors to take the throne. He succeeded in 1603, and the capital was moved to Oudong. Cambodia had now fallen under Siamese control and for the next few centuries would alternate between monarchs with short reigns under the Yoke of Siam or Vietnam.

== See also ==
- Cambodian–Spanish War
- Spanish protectorate in Morocco
