= Kavalan language =

East Formosan language of Taiwan

Kavalan
- kbaran, kebalan (Kavalan)
- Pronunciation: [kɨβaɾán]
- Native to: Taiwan
- Ethnicity: Kavalan
- Native speakers: 70 (2015)
- Language family: Austronesian: East Formosan; Kavalanic; Kavalan
- Writing system: Latin (Kavalan alphabet)

Language codes
- ISO 639-3: ckv
- Glottolog: kava1241
- ELP: Kavalan
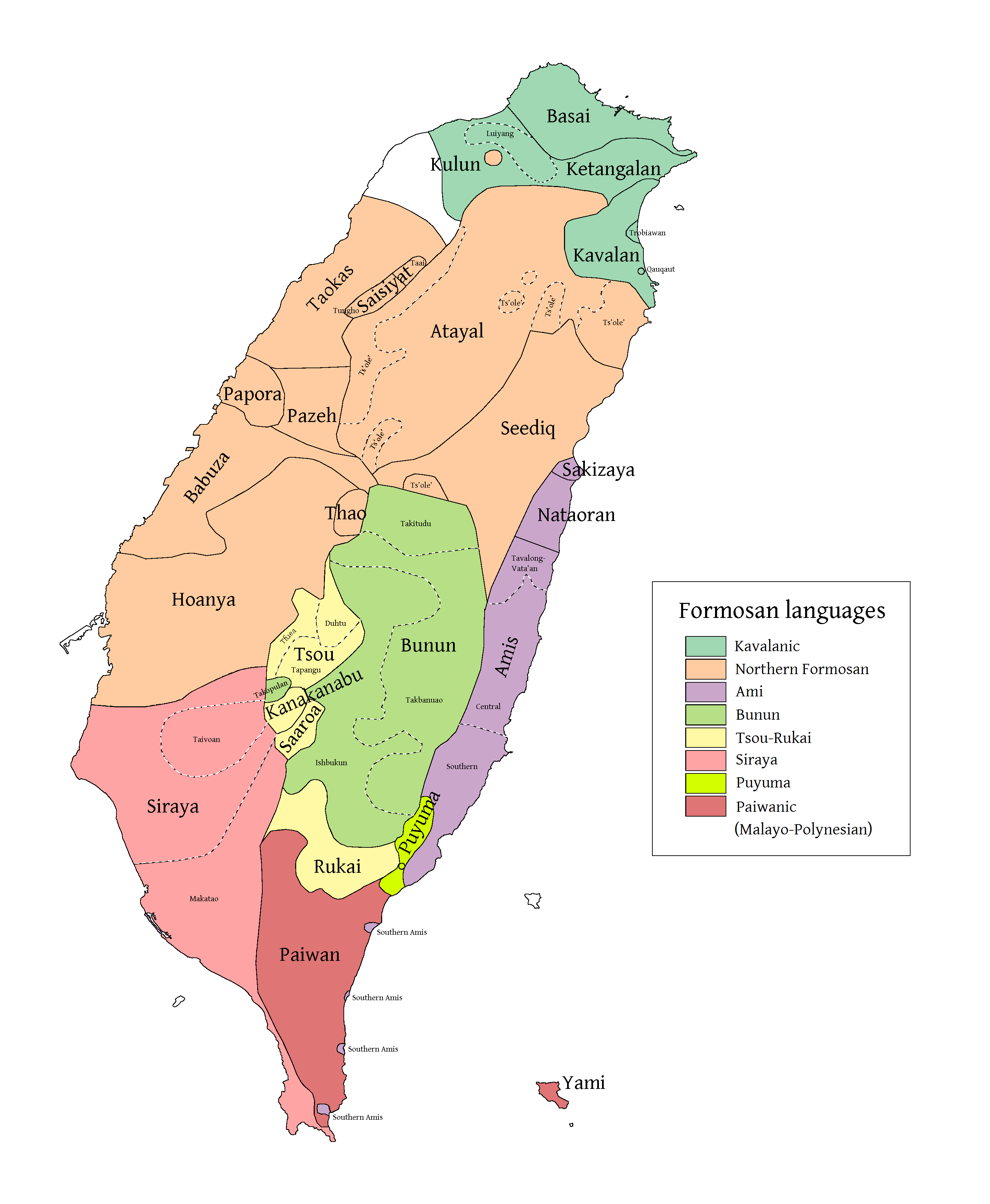
- (dark green, north) The Kavalanic languages: Basai, Ketagalan, and Kavalan

- Kavalan is classified as Critically Endangered by the UNESCO Atlas of the World's Languages in Danger.

Kavalan (also known as Kvalan, Kebalan or Kbalan) was formerly spoken in the Northeast coast area of Taiwan by the Kavalan people (噶瑪蘭). It is an East Formosan language of the Austronesian family.

Kavalan is no longer spoken in its original area. As of 1930, it was used only as a home language. As of 1987, it was still spoken in Atayal territories. In 2000, this language was still reported to be spoken by 24 speakers but considered moribund.

In 2017, a study using the EDGE metric from species conservation found that Kavalan, although critically endangered, was among the most lexically distinct of Austronesian languages.

== Dialects ==
Kavalan consists of the following speech communities ordered from north to south:

- Kariawan (Jialiwan 加禮宛) – near Hualien, a formerly Sakizaya-speaking area
- Patʀungan (Xinshe 新社) – located in Fungpin (豐濱鄉), Hualien
- Kulis (Lide 立德)
- Kralut (Zhangyuan 樟原)

These speech communities in eastern Taiwan were named after older settlements from the north, such as Kariawan, Sahut, and Tamayan, where the Kavalan people originally migrated from. Modern-day Kavalan speakers are surrounded by the Amis.

Tsuchida (1985) notes that word lists collected from Lamkham 南崁 (Nankan) and Poting 埔頂 (Buding) are closest to Kavalan, while Li (2001) counts them as 'Basaic' languages.

Many Kavalan can also speak Amis, Taiwanese, Mandarin, and Japanese.

== Phonology ==
There are 15 consonants and 4 vowels in Kavalan.

Consonants
		Bilabial	Dental	Alveolar	Palatal	Velar	Uvular
Nasal		m	n			ŋ	
Plosive	voiceless	p	t			k	q
Plosive	voiced	b					
Fricative	voiceless		s				
Fricative	voiced		z	ɮ [ɮ ~ d]			ʁ
Approximant				l [l ~ ɫ ~ ɾ]	j	w	

Vowels
	Front	Central	Back
Close	i		u
Mid		ə	
Open	a		

In Kavalan, Proto-Austronesian phonemes have merged as follows:

- *n, *N, *j, *ɲ as n
- *t, *T, *c as t
- *d, *D, *Z as z
- *s, *S as s
- *q, *ʔ, *H are deleted

The following Proto-Austronesian phonemes are split:

- *k into q and k
- *l into r and ʁ (written as R)
- *a into i (if adjacent to q) and a

The Kavalan language is also notable for having a large inventory of consonant clusters. It is also one of the only two Formosan languages that has geminate consonants, with the other one being Basay. Consonant gemination is also common in the northern Philippine languages, but is non-existent in the Central Philippine languages except for Rinconada Bikol.

== Grammar ==
=== Morphology ===
Kavalan nouns and verbs are distinguished by the lack of /a/ in the first syllable (nouns) or presence of /a/ (verbs). Kavalan syllables take on the structure (C)(C)V(C)(C). Kavalan is also one of two Formosan languages to have geminating consonants.

Kavalan affixes include:

- m- (agent focus)
- -um-/-m- (agent focus)
- -in/-n- as variants of ni- (patient)
- -a (irrealis patient-focus marker)
- -an (locative-focus marker, nominalizer)
- -i (imperative, patient focus)
- pa- (causative)
- qa- (future)

Unlike many other Formosan languages, there is no *-en suffix.

=== Syntax ===
Kavalan, like most other Formosan and Philippine languages, has many case markers.

- Nominative: a/ya
- Oblique: ta, tu
- Genitive: na, ni
- Locative: sa, ta- -an

Types of focus in Kavalan include:

1. Agent
2. Patient
3. Locative
4. Instrumental
5. Beneficiary

The Kavalan case markers below are from Li & Tsuchida (2006:27).

Kavalan Case Markers
Case	Nominative	Oblique	Genitive	Locative
Common	a, ya	tu	na	sa, ta- -an
Personal	a, ya	ta	ni	–

=== Pronouns ===
The Kavalan personal pronouns below are from Li & Tsuchida (2006:30).

Kavalan Personal Pronouns
			Nominative	Genitive	Oblique	Locative
1st person	singular		aiku, =iku	zaku, -ku	timaiku	tamaikuan
1st person	plural	excl.	aimi, =imi	zanyaq, -nyaq	timaimi	tamaimian
1st person	plural	incl.	aita, =ita	zata, -ta, -kita	timaita	tamaitan
2nd person	singular		aisu, =isu	zasu, -su	timaisuanzen	tamaisuan
2nd person	plural		aimu, =imu	zanumi, -numi	timaimu	tamaimuan
3rd person	singular		aizipna tiyau	zana, -na	timaizipna tiyau	tamaizipan tiyauan
3rd person	plural		qaniyau	zana, -na	qaniyau	taqaniyauan

== Affixes ==
The Kavalan affixes below are from Li & Tsuchida (2006:14–24).

Prefixes

- i-: stative, having to do with location
- kar-: rapid motion; defective, not perfect
- ki-, qi-: pluck, pick
- kin-: number of humans
- lu-: flat
- luq(e)-: bumpy, rough (used with stative verbs)
- m-, -m-, mu-, -u-, -um-: agent-focus
- ma-, m-: stative
- maq-: where from
- mar-: sine kind of shape
- mi-: discharge something from the body
- mri-: settle down; to shrink, huddle up
- mrim-: a division of (a numeral)
- nan-: two people (kinship); distributive numeral
- ni-, n-, -in-, -n-: past, perfective
- pa-: causative (used with active verbs)
- pa- -an: agentive
- pa-ti: personal marker for the dead
- paq-, paqa-: causative (used with stative verbs)
- paq-: get on (a boat)
- pa-qi-: cause to become
- pat-: make a change
- pi-: put into, put away; do something to protect a body part; every (time)
- qa-: immediate future; ride, take (means of transportation)
- qa- -an: place of/for
- qaRu-: become, transform into; transformable into
- qi-: pick, gather, get
- qna-: nominaizer (used with stative verbs; -an is used with active verbs)
- Ra-: to transform into
- Ra-CV-: light color of
- Ri-: catch, get
- Ru-: just now; for the first time
- sa-: have the event (natural phenomena); do, make, produce, have; secrete (body fluid); tool
- sam-CV-: pretend
- saqa-: ordinal (numeral)
- si-: wear, own, possess
- sia-: go towards (place/direction); go to the side (often euphemistic for urinating/defecating)
- sim-: reciprocal
- siqa-: (number of) times
- smu-: finger
- sna-: model of, copy of
- su-: remove; move downwards, upside down, slanting
- su-CV-: stink or smell of
- tan-: speak the language
- taRi-: position, people in such a position
- ti-: instrumental-focus; to take each other (?)
- ti- (-an): beneficiary-focus
- tRi-CV(C)- (-an): discharge (body discharge) with control
- u-: agent-focus; non-human numeral

Suffixes

- -a: irrealis patient-focus marker
- -an: locative-focus marker, nominalizer
- -i: irrealis non-agent-focus imperative

Infixes

- -m-, -um-: agent-focus
- -n-, -in-, ni-: perfective
