= Kavalan people =

Indigenous ethnic group of Taiwan

kbaran, kebalan (Kavalan)
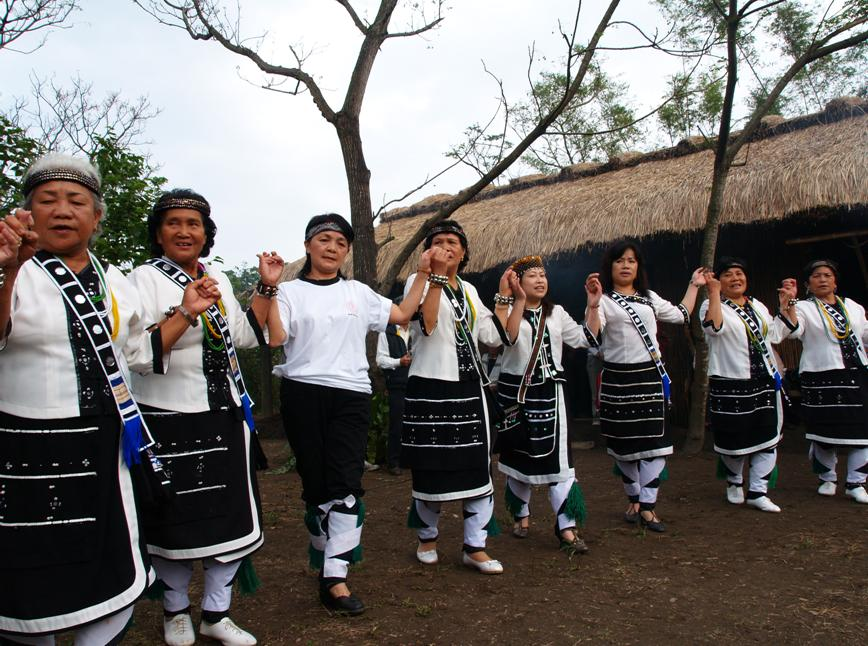

Total population
- 1,460 (2018)

Regions with significant populations
- Taiwan

Languages
- Kavalan, Mandarin, Hokkien

Religion
- Animism, Christianity

Related ethnic groups
- Other Taiwanese Aborigines; Especially Basay and Qauqaut

The Kavalan (endonym kbalan [kɨβaɾán]; "people living in the plain"; Chinese: 噶瑪蘭族) or Kuvalan are an indigenous people of Taiwan. Most of them moved to the coastal area of Hualien County and Taitung County in the 19th century due to encroachment by Han settlers. Their language is also known as Kavalan. Currently, the largest settlement of Kavalan is Xinshe (Kavalan: pateRongan) Village in Fengbin Township, Hualien County.

== History ==
Legend has it that the Kavalan arrived by sea from the east and that when they saw the stunning beauty of this location, they decided then and there to settle this bountiful land. The newly arrived Kavalan fought many battles against the local Atayal people, and in the end the Kavalan drove the Atayal into the mountains—true to their name "Kavalan", which means "flatland people". That name subsequently morphed into "Hamalan", ultimately yielding the modern-day Yilan City. They were referred as 36 Kavalan tribes (蛤仔難三十六社), although there were more than 60. In the past, tribes north of the Lanyang River were called Sai-sè-hoan (西勢番) while those south of the river were Tang-sè-hoan (東勢番).

The earliest record of the Kavalan in history was in 1632, when a Spanish ship went astray to this area by a typhoon. More clear record came in 1650 by the Dutch East India Company (VOC). Reportedly, at some point there was a Spanish province of Cabarán in the area. Han Chinese tried to settle in the area as early as 1768. However, settlement did not succeed until 1796, when Ngô͘ Soa established the first village (now Toucheng). Eventually, many more Han Chinese entered this area and the life of Kavalan was forced to change. Many of them moved to Beipu Village (in Sincheng Township of Hualien County) between 1830 and 1840.

== Culture ==
=== Clothing ===
In the past, Kavalan's men sometimes opted for shorter garments or exposing their chests and backs. The Han Chinese influence brought about the introduction of cotton clothing in the Han style.

Kavalan people wear traditional clothes only during important traditional performances and ritual practices. These traditional attires of the Kavalan community are unisex and are characterized by simplicity, typically featuring only one or two colors, predominantly black or white, and lack elaborate dyeing and colorful geometric patterns. The upper garments are practically identical for both men and women. The white shirt has a round neck, long sleeves, and a row of Chinese-style buttons in the middle, adorned with black cloth on the front. The lower garment usually consists of a skirt, commonly in black or white. Chiefs, elders, and shamans make an exception to this attire by wearing black pants and black shirt.

A crucial element in the crafting of Kavalan clothing is banana fiber. The Kavalan people weave this fiber into hemp fabric, which is then used for creating traditional Kavalan attire, as well as daily necessities and accessories like belts, straw capes, and tote bags, often complementing their traditional clothing.

== Karewan incident ==
In 1878, the Kavalan, and their Sakizaya allies, fought a devastating battle against Qing invaders after a dispute with Qing officials led to a local uprising. This event ended in disaster for both communities with many of their members slaughtered in the Takobowan incident (also known as the "Galeewan Incident" or "Kalyawan Battle"). Others were displaced by Han settlers. The remaining Sakizaya, meanwhile, were forced to blend with other peoples, such as the Amis, with the intention of protecting their identity.

== See also ==
- Kavalan language
- Yilan County
- Hualien County
- Plains indigenous peoples
- Taiwanese indigenous peoples
- Kavalan Distillery
