= East Formosan languages =

Austronesian language family of Taiwan

East Formosan
- Geographic distribution: Taiwan
- Linguistic classification: Austronesian: East Formosan
- Subdivisions: Kavalanic; Amis–Sakizaya; Sirayaic †

Language codes
- Glottolog: east2493
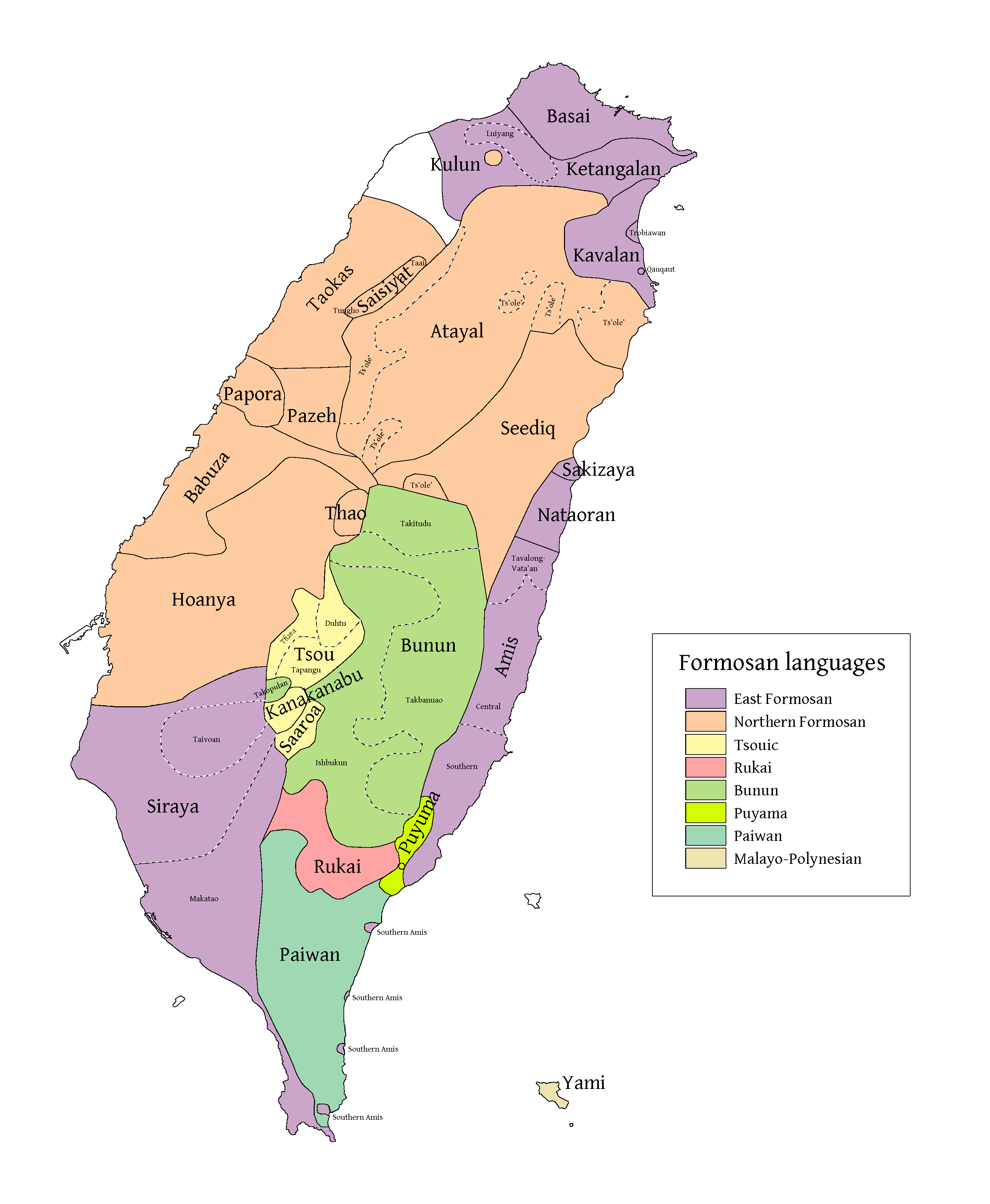
- (purple) Li's East Formosan

The East Formosan languages consist of various Formosan languages scattered across Taiwan, including Kavalan, Amis, and the extinct Siraya language. This grouping is supported by both Robert Blust and Paul Jen-kuei Li. Li considers the Siraya-speaking area in the southwestern plains of Taiwan to be the most likely homeland of the East Formosan speakers, where they then spread to the eastern coast of Taiwan and gradually migrated to the area of modern-day Taipei.

== Languages ==
- East Formosan
  - Kavalanic
    - Kavalan(endangered)
    - Basay†
    - Qauqaut†
  - Amis–Sakizaya
    - Sakizaya
    - Amis
  - Sirayaic
    - Siraya†
    - Taivoan–Makatao
      - Taivoan†
      - Makatao†

Luilang is often lumped together with the Ketagalan dialect of Basay, but is poorly attested and remains unclassified. Sagart posits it as a primary branch of Austronesian.

== Evidence ==
Li presents the following criteria as evidence for an East Formosan subgrouping.

1. Merger of *C and *t as /t/
2. Merger of *D and *Z as /r/ or /l/ in Basay, as /z/ in Kavalan
3. Merger of *q, *H, *ʔɦ and zero
4. Merger of *j, *n, and *N as /n/
5. Shift of *k into /q/ and /q/ > /h/ (Basay only) before *a

Li notes that the split of *k into k and q (before *a) is shared exclusively by Basay and Kavalan. Like Kavalan and Basay, the Siraya language merges the patient-focus and locative-focus forms, although Amis distinguishes the two focus forms. Li also lists dozens of lexical innovations shared by the East Formosan languages.

The Basay, Kavalan, and Amis also share an oral tradition stating a common origin from an island called “Sinasay” or “Sanasay,” which is probably the Green Island of today.

Laurent Sagart rejects having a nasal reflex of Proto-Austronesian *j as a criterion for an East Formosan subgrouping. He believes instead that *j was originally /ɲ/, making the nasal reflexes in East Formosan a common retention of the original nasality, not a common innovation that can define East Formosan.
