= Languages of Taiwan =

Austronesian and Sino-Tibetan languages

- The most commonly used home language in Taiwan, Penghu, Kinmen and Matsu, 2010. cmn: Mandarin nan: Hokkien / Min Nan hak: Hakka map: Austronesian languages
- Official: de jure: N/A de facto: Mandarin
- National: Mandarin (Note: Not designated but meets legal definition, that is "本法所稱國家語言，指臺灣各固有族群使用之自然語言及臺灣手語。" ("a natural language used by an original people group of Taiwan and the Taiwan Sign Language")); Taiwanese; Hakka; Formosan languages; Matsu; Taiwan Sign Language
- Main: Mandarin
- Indigenous: Formosan languages (Amis, Atayal, Bunun, Kanakanavu, Kavalan, Paiwan, Puyuma, Rukai, Saaroa, Saisiyat, Sakizaya, Seediq, Thao, Truku, Tsou), Philippine (Tao)
- Immigrant: Indonesian, Tagalog (Filipino), Thai, Vietnamese, Malay
- Foreign: English, Indonesian, Japanese, Korean, Tagalog (Filipino), Thai, Vietnamese
- Signed: Taiwan Sign Language
- Keyboard layout: QWERTY with Bopomofo, Cangjie and Dayi

The languages of Taiwan consist of several varieties of languages under the families of Austronesian languages and Sino-Tibetan languages. The Formosan languages, a geographically designated branch of Austronesian languages, have been spoken by the Taiwanese indigenous peoples for thousands of years. Owing to the wide internal variety of the Formosan languages, research on historical linguistics recognizes Taiwan as the Urheimat (homeland) of the whole Austronesian language family. In the last 400 years, several waves of Han emigrations brought several different Sinitic languages into Taiwan. These languages include Taiwanese Hokkien, Hakka, and Mandarin, which have become the major languages spoken in present-day Taiwan.

Formosan languages were the dominant language of prehistorical Taiwan. Taiwan's long colonial and immigration history brought in several languages such as Dutch, Spanish, Hokkien, Hakka, Japanese, and Mandarin. Due to the former Japanese occupation of the island, the Japanese language has influenced the languages of Taiwan, particularly in terms of vocabulary, with many loanwords coming from Japanese.

After World War II, a long martial law era was held in Taiwan. Policies of the government in this era suppressed languages other than Mandarin in public use. This has significantly damaged the evolution of local languages, including Taiwanese Hokkien, Hakka, Formosan languages, and the Matsu dialect. The situation had slightly changed since the 2000s when the government made efforts to protect and revitalize local languages. Local languages became part of elementary school education in Taiwan, laws and regulations regarding local language protection were established for Hakka and Formosan languages, and public TV and radio stations exclusively for these two languages were also established. Currently, the government of Taiwan also maintains standards for several widely spoken languages listed below; the percentage of users are from the 2010 population and household census in Taiwan.

== Overview of national languages ==
Language		Percentage of home use	Recognised variants	National language	Statutory language for public transport	Regulated by
Taiwanese Mandarin		83.5%	1	By legal definition	Required nationwide	Ministry of Education
Taiwanese Hokkien (incl. Kinmen dialect)		81.9%	1~6	By legal definition	Required nationwide	Ministry of Education
Taiwanese Hakka		6.6%	6	By legal definition	Required nationwide	Ministry of Education Hakka Affairs Council
Formosan languages	Amis	1.4%	5	By legal definition	Discretionary	Council of Indigenous Peoples
Formosan languages	Atayal	1.4%	6	By legal definition	Discretionary	Council of Indigenous Peoples
Formosan languages	Bunun	1.4%	5	By legal definition	Discretionary	Council of Indigenous Peoples
Formosan languages	Kanakanavu	1.4%	1	By legal definition	Discretionary	Council of Indigenous Peoples
Formosan languages	Kavalan	1.4%	1	By legal definition	Discretionary	Council of Indigenous Peoples
Formosan languages	Paiwan	1.4%	4	By legal definition	Discretionary	Council of Indigenous Peoples
Formosan languages	Puyuma	1.4%	4	By legal definition	Discretionary	Council of Indigenous Peoples
Formosan languages	Rukai	1.4%	6	By legal definition	Discretionary	Council of Indigenous Peoples
Formosan languages	Saaroa	1.4%	1	By legal definition	Discretionary	Council of Indigenous Peoples
Formosan languages	Saisiyat	1.4%	1	By legal definition	Discretionary	Council of Indigenous Peoples
Formosan languages	Sakizaya	1.4%	1	By legal definition	Discretionary	Council of Indigenous Peoples
Formosan languages	Seediq	1.4%	3	By legal definition	Discretionary	Council of Indigenous Peoples
Formosan languages	Thao	1.4%	1	By legal definition	Discretionary	Council of Indigenous Peoples
Formosan languages	Truku	1.4%	1	By legal definition	Discretionary	Council of Indigenous Peoples
Formosan languages	Tsou	1.4%	1	By legal definition	Discretionary	Council of Indigenous Peoples
Malayo-Polynesian	Tao	1.4%	1	By legal definition	Discretionary	Council of Indigenous Peoples
Taiwan sign language		<1%	1	By legal definition	N/A	Ministry of Culture
Matsu dialect		<1%	1	By legal definition	Required in Matsu Islands	Ministry of Culture; Department of Education, Lienchiang County Government
Wuqiu dialect		<1%	1	By legal definition but not listed	N/A	N/A

== Indigenous languages ==
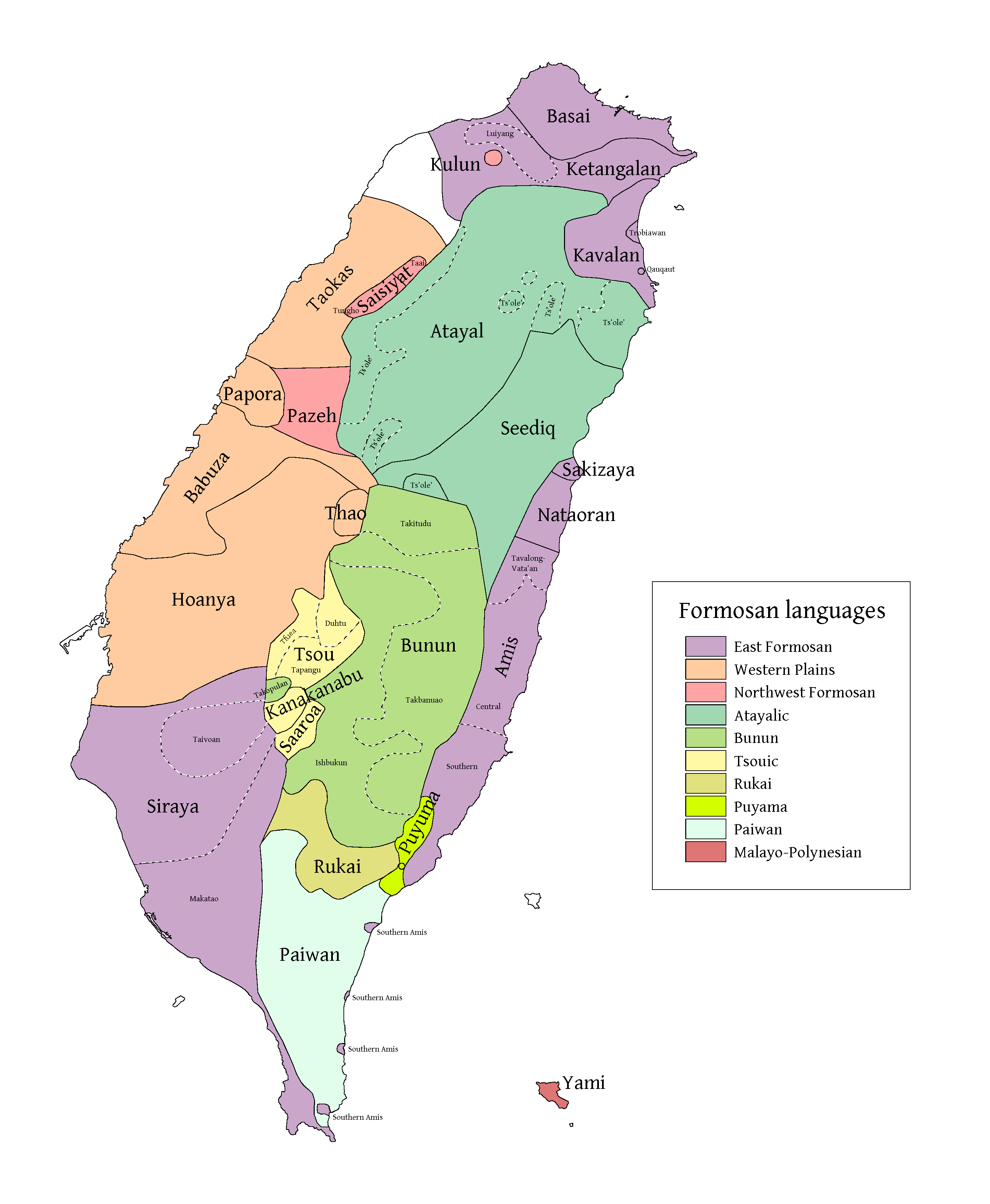
Families of Formosan languages before Chinese colonization, per Blust. Malayo-Polynesian (red) may lie within Eastern Formosan (purple). Note that the white section in the northwest of the country does not indicate a complete absence of aboriginal people from that part of Taiwan. On Chinese-language sources, this area is listed as the homeland of various Plains Indigenous groups (e.g. the Kulon), and certain other groups (e.g. the Taokas) are arranged slightly differently than they are on the above map.

Percentage of residents using an indigenous language at home in 2010.

The Taiwanese indigenous languages or Formosan languages are the languages of the Taiwanese indigenous peoples. Taiwanese indigenous peoples currently comprise about 2.3% of the island's population. However, far fewer can still speak their ancestral language after centuries of language shift. It is common for young and middle-aged Hakka and Taiwanese indigenous peoples to speak Mandarin and Hokkien better than, or to the exclusion of, their ethnic languages. Of the approximately 26 languages of the Taiwanese indigenous peoples, at least ten are extinct, another five are moribund, and several others are to some degree endangered. The government recognizes 16 languages and 42 accents of the indigenous languages.

Classification		Recognized languages (accents)
Formosan	Atayalic	Atayal (6), Seediq (3), Truku (1)
Formosan	Rukaic	Rukai (6)
Formosan	Northern Formosan	Saisiyat (1), Thao (1)
Formosan	Eastern Formosan	Amis (5), Kavalan (1), Sakizaya (1)
Formosan	Southern Formosan	Paiwan (4), Bunun (5), Puyuma (4)
Formosan	Tsouic	Tsou (1), Kanakanavu (1), Saaroa (1)
Malayo-Polynesian	Batanic (Philippine)	Tao (1)

The governmental agency Council of Indigenous Peoples maintains the orthography of the writing systems of Formosan languages. Due to the era of Taiwan under Japanese rule, a large number of loanwords from Japanese also appear in Formosan languages. There is also Yilan Creole Japanese as a mixture of Japanese and Atayal.

All Formosan languages are slowly being replaced by culturally dominant Mandarin. In recent decades the government started an aboriginal reappreciation program that included the reintroduction of Formosan mother tongue education in Taiwanese schools. However, the results of this initiative have been disappointing. The television station Taiwan Indigenous Television and radio station Alian 96.3 were created as efforts to revive the indigenous languages. Formosan languages were made an official language in July 2017.

The Amis language is the most widely spoken indigenous language on the eastern coast of the island, where Hokkien and Hakka are less present than on the western coast. The government estimates put the number of Amis people at a little over 200,000, but the number of people who speak Amis as their first language is lower than 10,000. Amis has appeared in some mainstream popular music. Other significant indigenous languages include Atayal, Paiwan, and Bunun. In addition to the recognized languages, there are around 10 to 12 groups of Taiwanese Plains Indigenous Peoples with their respective languages.

Some indigenous people and languages are recognized by local governments. These include Siraya (and its Makatao and Taivoan varieties) to the southwest of the island. Some other language revitalization movements are going on Basay to the north, Babuza-Taokas in the most populated western plains, and Pazeh bordering it in the center west of the island.

== Sinitic languages ==
Quadrilingual broadcasting on a bus in New Taipei City, in Mandarin, Hokkien, Hakka, and English.

=== Taiwanese Mandarin ===
Mandarin is commonly known and officially referred to as the national language (國語; Guóyǔ) in Taiwan. In 1945, following the end of World War II, Mandarin was introduced as the de facto official language and made compulsory in schools. Before 1945, Japanese was the official language and taught in schools. Since then, Mandarin has been established as a lingua franca among the various groups in Taiwan: the majority Taiwanese-speaking Hoklo (Hokkien), the Hakka who have their own spoken language, the aboriginals who speak aboriginal languages; as well as Mainland Chinese immigrated in 1949 whose native tongue may be any Chinese variant.

People who emigrated from mainland China after 1949 (12% of the population) mostly speak Mandarin Chinese. Mandarin is almost universally spoken and understood. It was the only officially sanctioned medium of instruction in schools in Taiwan from late 1940s to late 1970s, following the handover of Taiwan to the government of the Republic of China in 1945, until English became a high school subject in the 1980s and local languages became a school subject in the 2000s.

Taiwanese Mandarin (as with Singlish and many other situations of a creole speech community) is spoken at different levels according to the social class and situation of the speakers. Formal occasions call for the acrolectal level of Standard Chinese of Taiwan (國語; Guóyǔ), which differs little from the Standard Chinese of China (普通话; Pǔtōnghuà). Less formal situations may result in the basilect form, which has more uniquely Taiwanese features. Bilingual Taiwanese speakers may code-switch between Mandarin and Taiwanese, sometimes in the same sentence.

Many Taiwanese, particularly the younger generations, speak Mandarin better than Hakka or Hokkien, and it has become a lingua franca for the island amongst the Chinese dialects.

=== Taiwanese Hokkien ===
Commonly known as Taiwanese (臺語, Pe̍h-ōe-jī: Tâi-gí) and officially referred as Taiwanese Hokkien (臺灣閩南語; Tâi-oân Bân-lâm-gú); Taiwanese Hokkien is the most-spoken native language in Taiwan, spoken by about 70% of the population. Linguistically, it is a subgroup of Southern Min languages variety originating in southern Fujian province and is spoken by many overseas Chinese throughout Southeast Asia.

There are both colloquial and literary registers of Taiwanese. Colloquial Taiwanese has roots in Old Chinese. Literary Taiwanese, which was originally developed in the 10th century in Fujian and based on Middle Chinese, was used at one time for formal writing but is now largely extinct. Due to the era of Taiwan under Japanese rule, a large number of loanwords from Japanese also appear in Taiwanese. The loanwords may be read in Kanji through Taiwanese pronunciation or simply use the Japanese pronunciation. These reasons make the modern writing Taiwanese in a mixed script of traditional Chinese characters and Latin-based systems such as pe̍h-ōe-jī or the Taiwanese romanization system derived from pe̍h-ōe-jī in official use since 2006.

Recent work by scholars such as Ekki Lu, Sakai Toru, and Lí Khîn-hoāⁿ (also known as Tavokan Khîn-hoāⁿ or Chin-An Li), based on former research by scholars such as Ông Io̍k-tek, has gone so far as to associate part of the basic vocabulary of the colloquial language with the Austronesian and Tai language families; however, such claims are not without controversy. Recently there has been a growing use of Taiwanese Hokkien in the broadcast media.

Accent differences among Taiwanese dialects are relatively small but still exist. The standard accent — Thong-hêng accent (通行腔) is sampled from Kaohsiung city, while other accents fall into a spectrum between

- Hái-kháu accent (海口腔): representing the accent spoken in Lukang, close to Quanzhou dialect in China, and
- Lāi-po͘ accent (內埔腔): representing the accent spoken in Yilan, close to Zhangzhou dialect in China.

Much of Taiwanese Hokkien is mutually intelligible with other dialects of Hokkien as spoken in China and South-east Asia (such as Singaporean Hokkien), but also to a degree with the Teochew variant of Southern Min spoken in Eastern Guangdong, China. It is, however, mutually unintelligible with Mandarin and other Chinese languages.

=== Taiwanese Hakka ===
Townships/cities and districts in Taiwan where Hakka is a statutory regional language according to the Hakka Basic Act

Hakka (客家語; Hak-kâ-ngî) is mainly spoken in Taiwan by people who have Hakka ancestry. These people are concentrated in several places throughout Taiwan. The majority of Hakka Taiwanese reside in Taoyuan, Hsinchu and Miaoli. Varieties of Taiwanese Hakka were officially recognized as national languages. Currently the Hakka language in Taiwan is maintained by the Hakka Affairs Council. This governmental agency also runs Hakka TV and Hakka Radio stations. The government currently recognizes and maintains five Hakka dialects (six, if Sixian and South Sixian are counted independently) in Taiwan.

Usage of Subdialects of Taiwanese Hakka
Subdialect (in Hakka)	Si-yen	Hói-liu̍k	South Si-yen	Thai-pû	Ngiàu-Phìn	Cheu-ôn
Subdialect (in Chinese)	四縣腔; Sixian	海陸腔; Hailu	南四縣腔; South Sixian	大埔腔; Dabu	饒平腔; Raoping	詔安腔; Zhao'an
Percentage (as of 2013)	56.1%	41.5%	4.8%	4.2%	1.6%	1.3%
Percentage (as of 2016)	58.4%	44.8%	7.3%	4.1%	2.6%	1.7%

=== Matsu dialect ===
Matsu dialect (馬祖話, Mā-cū-ngṳ̄) is the language spoken in Matsu islands. It is a dialect of Fuzhounese of the Eastern Min branch.

=== Wuqiu dialect ===
Wuqiu dialect (烏坵話, Ou-chhiu-uā) is the language spoken in Wuchiu islands. It is a dialect of Hinghwa of the Pu-Xian Min branch. Due to the low population of native speakers, the language is not recognise as a national language.

=== Cantonese ===
Cantonese is spoken by Waishengren immigrants from Guangdong, Guangxi, Hong Kong, and Macau. There are also significant of Malaysian Chinese can speak the language. Various Cantonese-speaking communities exist throughout Taiwan. Cantonese is the largest Sinitic language that Taiwan does not recognize as a national language, as it is not native to the island, was not brought by early Han settlers, and is not used in any official capacity.

A total of 119,129 Hong Kong and Macao residents have been granted permanent residency status, though the number currently residing in Taiwan is not reported.

== Written and sign languages ==
=== Chinese characters ===
Traditional Chinese characters are widely used in Taiwan to write Sinitic languages including Mandarin, Taiwanese Hokkien, and Hakka. The Ministry of Education maintains standards of writing for these languages, publications including the Standard Form of National Characters and the recommended characters for Taiwanese Hokkien and Hakka.

Written vernacular Chinese is the standard of written Chinese used in official documents, general literature and most aspects of everyday life, and has grammar based on Modern Standard Mandarin. Vernacular Chinese is the modern written variant of Chinese that supplanted the use of classical Chinese in literature following the New Culture Movement of the early 20th Century, which is based on the grammar of Old Chinese spoken in ancient times. Although written vernacular Chinese had replaced Classical Chinese and emerged as the mainstream written Chinese in the Republic of China since the May Fourth Movement, Classical Chinese continued to be widely used in the Government of the Republic of China. Most government documents in the Republic of China were written in Classical Chinese until reforms in the 1970s, in a reform movement spearheaded by President Yen Chia-kan to shift the written style to a more combined vernacular Chinese and Classical Chinese style (文白合一行文). After January 1, 2005, the Executive Yuan also changed the long-standing official document writing habit from vertical writing style to horizontal writing style.

Today, pure Classical Chinese is occasionally used in formal or ceremonial occasions and religious or cultural rites in Taiwan. The National Anthem of the Republic of China (中華民國國歌), for example, is in Classical Chinese. Taoist texts are still preserved in Classical Chinese from the time they were composed. Buddhist texts, or sutras, are still preserved in Classical Chinese from the time they were composed or translated from Sanskrit sources. In practice, there is a socially accepted continuum between vernacular Chinese and Classical Chinese. Most official government documents, legal, courts rulings and judiciary documents used a combined vernacular Chinese and Classical Chinese style (文白合一行文). For example, most official notices and formal letters are written with a number of stock Classical Chinese expressions (e.g. salutation, closing). Personal letters, on the other hand, are mostly written in the vernacular, but with some Classical phrases, depending on the subject matter, the writer's level of education, etc.

In recent times, following the Taiwan localization movement and an increasing presence of Taiwanese literature, written Hokkien based on the vocabulary and grammar of Taiwanese Hokkien is occasionally used in literature and informal communications.

Traditional Chinese characters are also used in Hong Kong and Macau. A small number of characters are written differently in Taiwan; the Standard Form of National Characters is the orthography standard used in Taiwan and administered by the Ministry of Education, and has minor variations compared with the standardized character forms used in Hong Kong and Macau. Such differences relate to orthodox and vulgar variants of Chinese characters.

=== Latin alphabet and romanization ===
Latin alphabet is native to Formosan languages and partially native to Taiwanese Hokkien and Hakka. With the early influences of European missionaries, writing systems such as Sinckan Manuscripts, Pe̍h-ōe-jī, and Pha̍k-fa-sṳ were based on in Latin alphabet. Currently, the official writing systems of Formosan languages are solely based on Latin and maintained by the Council of Indigenous Peoples. The Ministry of Education also maintains Latin-based systems Taiwanese Romanization System for Taiwanese Hokkien, and Taiwanese Hakka Romanization System for Hakka. The textbooks of Taiwanese Hokkien and Hakka are written in a mixed script of traditional Chinese characters and the Latin alphabet.

Chinese language romanization in Taiwan tends to be highly inconsistent. Taiwan still uses the Zhuyin system and does not commonly use the Latin alphabet as the language phonetic symbols. Traditionally Wade–Giles is used. The central government adopted Tongyong Pinyin as the official romanization in 2002, and although it was replaced with Hanyu Pinyin in 2009, the English names of many places still are derived from their Tongyong Pinyin romanizations.

=== Phonetic symbols ===

Zhuyin Fuhao, often abbreviated as Zhuyin, or known as Bopomofo after its first four letters, is the phonetic system of Taiwan for teaching the pronunciation of Chinese characters, especially in Mandarin. Mandarin uses 37 symbols to represent its sounds: 21 consonants and 16 rimes. Taiwanese Hokkien uses 45 symbols to represent its sounds: 21 consonants and 24 rimes. There is also a system created for Hakka language.

These phonetic symbols sometimes appear as ruby characters printed next to the Chinese characters in young children's books, and in editions of classical texts (which frequently use characters that appear at very low-frequency rates in newspapers and other such daily fares). In advertisements, these phonetic symbols are sometimes used to write certain particles (e.g., ㄉ instead of 的); other than this, one seldom sees these symbols used in mass media adult publications except as a pronunciation guide (or index system) in dictionary entries. Bopomofo symbols are also mapped to the ordinary Roman character keyboard (1 = bo, q = po, a = mo, and so forth) used in one method for inputting Chinese text when using a computer. In more recent years, with the advent of smartphones, it has become increasingly common to see Zhuyin used in written slang terms instead of typing full characters – for example ㄅㄅ replacing 拜拜 (bye bye). It is also used to give phrases a different tone, like using ㄘ for 吃 (to eat) to indicate a childlike tone in the writing.

The sole purpose of Zhuyin in elementary education is to teach standard Mandarin pronunciation to children. Grade one textbooks of all subjects (including Mandarin) are entirely in zhuyin. After that year, Chinese character texts were given in annotated form. Around grade four, the presence of Zhuyin annotation is greatly reduced, remaining only in the new character section. School children learn the symbols so that they can decode pronunciations given in a Chinese dictionary and also so that they can find how to write words for which they know only the sounds. Even among adults, it is almost universally used in Taiwan to explain the pronunciation of a certain character being referred to by others.

=== Sign language ===
Taiwan has a national sign language, the Taiwanese Sign Language (TSL), which was developed from Japanese Sign Language during Japanese colonial rule. TSL has some mutual intelligibility with Japanese Sign Language (JSL) and the Korean Sign Language as a result (KSL). TSL has about a 60% lexical similarity with JSL.

== Other languages ==
=== East Asian languages ===
- Japanese: The Japanese language was compulsorily taught while Taiwan was under Japanese rule (1895 to 1945). By 1943, over 80% of the Taiwanese population at the time were speakers of Japanese. Taiwanese Americans and others in the Taiwanese diaspora may have older relatives or grandparents who learned Japanese and also spoke it as the lingua franca during their youth. Many famous Taiwanese figures, including former Taiwanese President, Lee Teng-hui, and the founder of Nissin and inventor of instant ramen, Momofuku Ando, were considered to be native Japanese speakers due to being born in Japanese Taiwan. Japanese is also one of the languages that is used in metro stations.
- Korean: The Korean language, along with English and Japanese are the most popular foreign languages to learn in Taiwan. The reason of its popularity is due to the Korean Wave. The Korean language is also one of the languages used in metro stations.

=== Southeast Asian languages ===
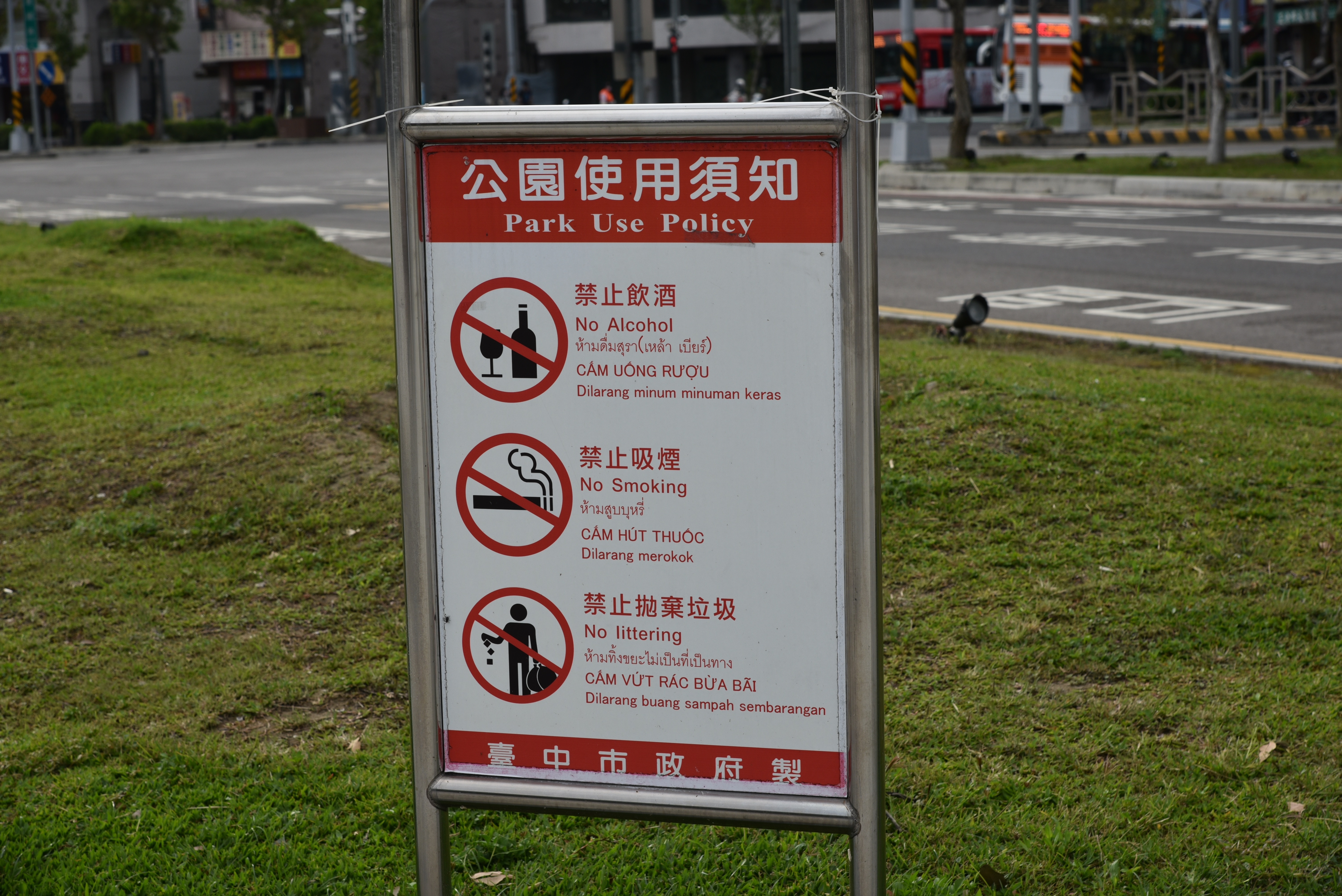
Sign in Taichung in Chinese, English, Thai, Vietnamese and Indonesian.

A significant number of immigrants and spouses in Taiwan are from Southeast Asia.

- Thai: widely spoken among the approximately 80,000 Thai people in Taiwan.
- Indonesian: widely spoken among the approximately 140,000 Indonesians in Taiwan.
- Vietnamese: widely spoken among the approximately 200,000 Vietnamese in Taiwan. There has been some effort, particularly beginning in 2011, to teach Vietnamese as a heritage language to children of Vietnamese immigrants.
- Tagalog: widely spoken by the approximately 100,000 Filipinos in Taiwan. Due to many Filipinos being able to speak English, government owned signboards which feature Thai, Vietnamese and Indonesian are less likely to be written in Tagalog.
- Malay: One of the languages of Taiwan's new immigrants, but less significant as most Malay-speaking immigrants are able to speak Mandarin Chinese and English fluently. Malay is understandable by Malaysian Chinese and Bruneian Chinese as their national language. However, very few have Malay as their first language. Compared to ethnic Chinese, the population of Malay and other bumiputera in Taiwan is very low. However, descendants of Malaysian Chinese take Malay language class, while most of the Malay language teachers are Malaysian Chinese.
- Burmese: One of the languages of Taiwan's new immigrants, but less significant.
- Khmer: One of the languages of Taiwan's new immigrants, but less significant.

=== European languages ===
- Dutch: Dutch was taught to the residents of the island during the Dutch colonial rule of Taiwan (1624–1662) under the Dutch East India Company, as evidenced in the Sinckan Manuscripts. After the withdrawal of Dutch presence in Taiwan, the use of the language disappeared.
- Spanish: Spanish was mainly spoken by Spaniards (from Spanish Philippines), including Spanish friar missionaries, and the native Taiwanese as they Christianized in the northern part of the island during the establishment of Spanish Formosa (1626–1642). Two countries that have diplomatic relations with Taiwan, Guatemala and Paraguay, are Spanish-speaking.
- English: English is widely taught as a foreign language, with some large private schools providing English instruction. Taiwan's government under the 2030 Bilingual Nation policy promulgated in 2017 to make English an official language and to provide for English to become a second language by 2030.

== See also ==
- Taiwanese indigenous peoples
- Han Taiwanese – Hoklo Taiwanese, Hakka Taiwanese
- Formosan languages
- Taiwanese Hokkien
- Taiwanese Hakka
- Taiwanese Mandarin
