= Chinese language romanization in Taiwan =

There are many romanization systems used in Taiwan (officially the Republic of China). The first Chinese language romanization system in Taiwan, Pe̍h-ōe-jī, was developed for Taiwanese by Presbyterian missionaries and has been promoted by the indigenous Presbyterian Churches since the 19th century. Pe̍h-ōe-jī is also the first written system of Taiwanese Hokkien; a similar system for Hakka was also developed at that time. During the period of Japanese rule, the promotion of roman writing systems was suppressed under the Dōka and Kōminka policy. After World War II, Taiwan was handed over from Japan to the Republic of China in 1945. The romanization of Mandarin Chinese was also introduced to Taiwan as official or semi-official standard.

Today, many commonly encountered Taiwanese proper names (places and people) are written in Wade–Giles (the system most used by Western academics until the internationalization of Hanyu Pinyin in the 1980s), Chinese postal romanization (a historic semi-official system), or Gwoyeu Romatzyh (a system that records tones without tone marks). After a long debate, Hanyu Pinyin, the official romanization system used in the People's Republic of China, was planned to be the nationwide standard in Taiwan for 2009. While the national government and many provinces and cities adopted Hanyu Pinyin for use on signs, some places use Tongyong Pinyin and older systems. Examples being, Kaohsiung, Taiwan's second most populous city, and Taichung.

Since most Taiwanese are taught Bopomofo as a way to transcribe the pronunciation of Mandarin Chinese words rather than a romanization system, there is little incentive to standardize romanization.

== History ==
Prior to Dutch arrival to Formosa, the Taiwanese indigenous peoples did not use writing. During the brief Dutch rule over the island, Dutch missionaries created the Sinkan (新港) romanization system based on their own language to communicate with and evangelize native Formosans, particularly the Siraya people, who continued to utilize the script for over a century after the Dutch departure.

Character-based writing only became prominent after the arrival of Koxinga, who expelled the Dutch and established the Kingdom of Tungning (1661–1683), the first Chinese governance in Taiwan. Han immigrants from mainland China increased, and thus Chinese characters became more prominent, displacing Sinkan as the dominant writing system. The Han population during the 17th century spoke primarily Hokkien and Hakka.

Under Qing dynasty rule over Taiwan (1683–1895), Mandarin was used as an elite lingua franca in governance, and those privileged enough to attend school would study Chinese characters and Chinese classics, while speaking Hokkien or Hakka natively. During this era, characters were also novelly deployed to write vernacular Hokkien books, called Koa-á-chehh.

Pe̍h-ōe-jī (POJ), an orthography used to write variants of Southern Min, was the first Chinese language romanization system in Taiwan. It was developed by Presbyterian missionaries who arrived to the island circa 1860, based on previous work done by missionaries to Southern Min-speaking communities in Southeast Asia, particularly Malacca. Pe̍h-ōe-jī is also the first written system for Taiwanese Hokkien, and a similar system for Hakka was also developed at that time. A milestone was reached when the system was standardized and popularized through Thomas Barclay's Taiwan Church News, beginning in 1885.

In 1892, the Wade–Giles system for the romanization of Mandarin Chinese was given completed form by Herbert Giles, who spent several years at Fort Santo Domingo (1885–1888) in Tamsui.

After the Japanese annexation of Taiwan in 1895 established Japan's colonial rule, Barclay encouraged Japanese officials to continue to use the system; Hokkien and written Chinese were tolerated, but Japanese was favored as the primary language of the island and a subject of mandatory education. Pe̍h-ōe-jī eventually faced strong competition during the Japanese era in Taiwan (1895–1945) in the form of Taiwanese kana, a system designed as a teaching aid and pronunciation guide, rather than an independent orthography like POJ.

At the time of Japanese annexation, neither Wade–Giles nor any other system came to serve as a uniform, standard romanization system. US Consul to Formosa James W. Davidson, who had spent eight years in Taiwan from the 1895 Japanese invasion to his 1903 publication of The Island of Formosa, Past and Present, gave the "Chinese" names of the ten most populous cities as Tainan, Twatutia (Toatutia), Banka, Kagi (Chia-i), Lokiang (Lokang), Kelung (Kiloung, Kilang or Keelung), Teckcham (Romanization of 竹塹, now Hsinchu 新竹), Changwha (Changhoa), Gilan, and Tangkang—demonstrating a functionally arbitrary use of romanized names.

There is fortunately no variance in the romaji spelling of the Japanese pronunciations; otherwise life in Formosa would be unbearable. The Chinese spelling and pronunciation is frequently given in as many as six or more different ways by as many so-called authorities. Tamsui, Tamshuy, Tamshui, Tamsoui, Tan-sui, are all one, likewise Changwha, Changhwa, Changhoa, Chanhue, Chan-hua, Tchanghoua, to which now is added the Japanese pronunciation Shoka. Hobé struggles along with nine different spellings all the way from Hobi to Hou-ouei.

— J. Davidson, The Island of Formosa (1903)

Scottish missionary William Campbell, whose mission in Formosa lasted forty-six years, wrote extensively on topics related to Taiwan. In 1903, he wrote that even as place names had increased in number with the recent development of the island, no effort was being made to follow any well-defined and consistent method of spelling. He also attributed some of the inconsistency in romanization to following the sounds of Mandarin dialect as opposed to the way they are locally pronounced. He believed that "the pronunciation as seen in Roman-letter books used by the natives must be taken as basis; while for outside purposes a simple method of spelling, in which all redundant letters and unusual signs are omitted, should be adopted." He also reported that, "since the cession of the island in 1895, the educational and telegraph departments have replaced the well-known Chinese names by Japanese ones."

From the 1930s onwards, with the increasing militarization of Japan and the Kōminka movement encouraging Taiwanese people to "Japanize", there were a raft of measures taken against local languages. In the climate of the ongoing Second Sino-Japanese War, the government banned the Taiwan Church News in 1942.

After the handover of Taiwan to the ROC, Mandarin has been used as the medium of instruction in the educational system and in the media. Use of dialects was considered unpatriotic and any further efforts to develop romanization schemes for them were prohibited. Use of POJ for proselytizing was outlawed in 1955, and the Taiwan Church News was banned again in 1969. In 1974, the Government Information Office banned Bernard Embree's A Dictionary of Southern Min, with a government official saying: "...we don't want it published as a book and sold publicly because of the Romanization it contains. Chinese should not be learning Chinese through Romanization." With the ending of martial law in 1987, the restrictions on "local languages" were quietly lifted, resulting in growing interest in Taiwanese writing during the 1990s. From 1987 to 1999, thirty different romanizations were invented.

Wade–Giles (for Mandarin) continued to co-exist with several official but obscure romanizations in succession: Gwoyeu Romatzyh (GR), Mandarin Phonetic Symbols II (MPS II, 1986), and Tongyong Pinyin (2002). Taiwan then switched to Hanyu Pinyin in 2009, which had become the international standard for romanized Chinese in the previous decades.

When Tongyong was introduced, it was used to romanize placenames (excluding top level divisions). Street and building signs have been normally transcribed in one of the official systems and not Wade–Giles, except in Taipei, where Hanyu was adopted in the early 2000s, before the rest of the country.

== Education ==
Romanization is not normally taught in Taiwan's public schools at any level. Consequently, most Taiwanese do not know how to romanize their names or addresses. Teachers use only Zhuyin ("bopomofo") for teaching and annotating the pronunciation of Mandarin. There have been sporadic discussions about using a romanization system during early education to teach children Mandarin pronunciation (similar to the way students in Mainland China learn Mandarin using Hanyu Pinyin). However, like all other aspects of romanization in Taiwan, this is a controversial issue. The plan in the early 2000s to adopt Pinyin was delayed due to disagreements over which form to use (Tongyong or Hanyu). The move is complicated by the magnitude of the effort needed to produce new instructional materials and retrain teachers.

Textbooks teaching other languages of Taiwan — namely, Hoklo, Hakka, and Formosan languages — now also often include pronunciation in romanizations (such as modified Tongyong) in addition to Zhuyin. Textbooks purely supplemented by romanization, without Zhuyin annotations, are very rare at the elementary-school level, since some schoolchildren are still unfamiliar with the Latin alphabet.

Government publications for teaching overseas Taiwanese children usually are completely bilingual, but only have Zhuyin in the main body of the texts and a comparison chart of Zhuyin and one or more romanization systems. Those for teaching advanced learners (such as youths and adults) have infrequent phonetic annotations for new phrases or characters. These annotations, usually in the footnotes, are romanized, in addition to having Zhuyin.

Like most Mandarin instructional materials released in North America, phrasebooks and textbooks targeting Mandarin learners from overseas (mostly adult learners and workers) in Taiwan usually include only Hanyu Pinyin with tone marks (accompanied by Traditional Chinese characters).

== Placenames ==
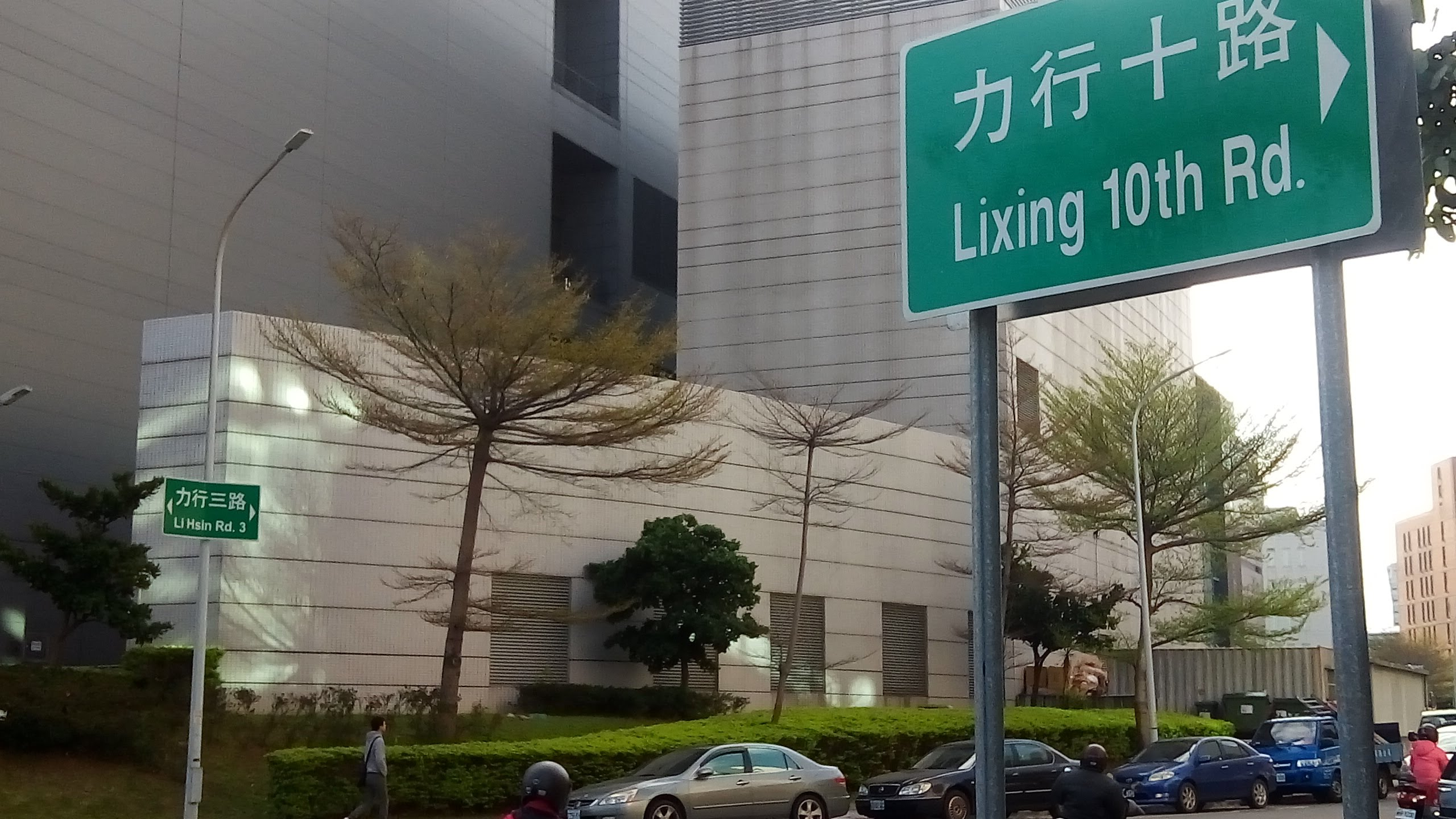
Two street signs using two different romanization systems for English translation at an intersection in East District, Hsinchu, Taiwan

When the national government officially adopted Tongyong Pinyin in 2002, local governments were to make their own choices. Consequently, Taipei adopted Hanyu Pinyin. Taipei replaced its earlier signage, most of which had used a modified version of Wade–Giles influenced by the Postal Office. However, the Taipei Metro (Taiwan's first rapid transit system) doesn't include apostrophes in any of its station names, even when this makes syllable boundaries unclear, such as with Qilian station (Chili An until 2003). Elsewhere in Taiwan, signs tend to a mix of systems, with Tongyong being common, but still having many signs left over from the MPS II (or even the GR) era.

The legal standard since 2009, Hanyu Pinyin, is used fairly consistently on Taiwan High Speed Rail and highways. Kaohsiung, Taiwan's third most populous city, continues to use Tongyong in its streets and MRT. Former mayor Han Kuo-yu proposed that the city adopt Hanyu Pinyin, but the plan was not carried through due to Han's recall and the COVID-19 pandemic.

The first- and second-level divisions of Taiwan (all counties and the biggest cities) are unaffected by the changing standards throughout the years, as their usage has become well-established. By tradition, all are in Wade–Giles, except Kinmen, which is a postal romanization, and Keelung, which is a long-standing way to refer to the city. Takow was another of the few well-known placenames of the early 20th century, but was changed to Takao after 1920 and Kaohsiung after 1945. Tainan and Taiwan have a history extending at least back to the Japanese era, as they are romanized consistently across Japanese and Wade–Giles. Tamsui District and Lukang Township have officially chosen to maintain their historic names (in Hoklo and Wade–Giles, respectively) to maintain recognition among tourists from abroad. In Tainan, the East, South, West Central, and North Districts use English instead of pinyin.

Romanization errors on local street signs are common throughout Taiwan because of the shortage of a workforce trained in romanization and the lack of political will for correct implementation. Many common errors are derived from the accent of Taiwanese Mandarin, such as interchanging the -ng and -n sounds. For example, guan and guang are often confused with one another on signs and plaques. Random typos (such as replacing e with t) are also ubiquitous. The area with the fewest errors on official signage is Taipei.

Because of the World Games 2009, Kaohsiung sponsored a "Say It Right" effort that fixed most of the romanization mistakes in the city. Since romanized signage is not a priority in areas with few foreign tourists, most errors occur in remote areas with limited resources (if there were any romanized signs to begin with).

== Personal names ==
Most people in Taiwan romanize their names using a variation of Wade–Giles. This simplified version employs no diacritics, tone marks, apostrophes, umlauts and, in semi- and unofficial contexts, does not follow the standard capitalization conventions of Wade–Giles. Under Wade–Giles, the first letter in the second character of the given names is generally lower case, but Taiwanese names tend not to follow this practice. For example, Lü Hsiu-lien is often written as Lu Hsiu-Lien. The use of Wade–Giles is generally not out of personal preference but because this system has been used by most government offices' reference materials in Taiwan to date.

There are a few Taiwanese personalities (such as politicians) whose names are in obscure or idiosyncratic schemes. For instance, using any major romanization, former president Lee Teng-hui's surname would have been Li. Former vice-president Vincent Siew's surname is a rare form of Xiao, from Hokkien (also Sio or Siau). Hsiao Bi-khim, Taiwan representative to the US and later vice-president, has a given name that is the Hokkien romanization of 美琴. The given names of successive presidents Ma Ying-jeou and Tsai Ing-wen are romanized in Gwoyeu Romatzyh. The single closest romanization to Chen Shui-bian's name would be Hanyu Pinyin.

On August 9, 2019, the Ministry of Foreign Affairs Bureau of Consular Affairs amended Article 14 of the Passport Act to make it possible to have Romanized names transliterated from one of a number of "national languages", which include Hoklo, Hakka, and indigenous languages. Previously only Mandarin romanization in Wade–Giles, Pinyin, or Tongyong Pinyin were possible.

== Businesses ==
Public and private enterprises are not bound to any set of standards in their English names. The variations in this areas are therefore even greater and unpredictable. Some chose to transliterate their names, but others opted to translate the meaning. The first word of Chunghwa Telecom, Chinese Television and China Airlines are actually identical in Mandarin, i.e., Zhonghua (中華), meaning "Chinese (in a general sense)".

Many business owners use an ad hoc approach, so long as the result is pronounceable and visually pleasant. The Hualon Group and Yulon Motor have opted for readability and have lost a couple of letters. (The second syllable would be long or lung in all major romanizations).

As many conglomerates in Taiwan are owned by the Hoklo, it is not uncommon to find companies that romanized their names in Hokkien. The Shin Kong Group, for example, is faithful to its Hokkien pronunciation (Chinese: 新光; Pe̍h-ōe-jī: Sin-kong) but not Mandarin.

Like those on street signs, romanization on store signs and commercial products' labels are not yet systematized.

== Other contexts ==
Postal addresses are romanized officially in both Hanyu and Tongyong Pinyin. Prior to 2000, addresses were usually written in Wade–Giles or MPS II. Given the correct 6-digit postal code, the postal workers are usually able to deliver mail in any romanization as well.

Most universities in Taiwan have names in Wade–Giles, such as Cheng Kung, Chung Hsing, Feng Chia and Chiao Tung. A few with pre-Taiwanese existence were created using postal romanization, i.e., Tsing Hua, Soochow, and Chengchi (actually simplified, since it would be -chih in Postal). Few universities have names in other local languages, such as Tamkang and Takming (both in Hoklo).

Since most elementary, middle, and senior high schools are under the jurisdiction of the local government, they follow whatever romanization the particular county or city uses at the time. For instance, during the first decade of the 21st century, the school signs outside of Taipei were usually in Tongyong Pinyin.

== See also ==
- Romanization of Chinese, a general discussion across regions
- Daoism–Taoism romanization issue, case study of the academic contention in romanizing Chinese
- Wade–Giles · Punctuation section, example of deviations from set standards in Taiwanese romanizations

== Works cited ==
- Campbell, William (1903). "Explanatory Notes". Formosa Under the Dutch: Described from Contemporary Records, with Explanatory Notes and A Bibliography of the Island. London: Kegan Paul. ISBN 9789576380839. LCCN 04007338.
- Chiung, Wi-vun Taiffalo (2001). "Romanization and Language Planning in Taiwan*" (PDF). The Linguistic Association of Korea Journal. 9 (1): 15–43.
- Davidson, James Wheeler (1903). The Island of Formosa, Past and Present. London: Macmillan. OL 6931635M.
- Klöter, Henning (2005). Written Taiwanese. Wiesbaden: Harrassowitz. ISBN 9783447050937.
- Lin, Peiyin (2015). "Language, Culture, and Identity: Romanization in Taiwan and Its Implications" (PDF). Taiwan Journal of East Asian Studies. 12 (2): 191–233. doi:10.6163/tjeas.2015.12(2)191.
