= Sinkang Manuscripts =

Series of Chinese leases, mortgages, and other commerce contracts

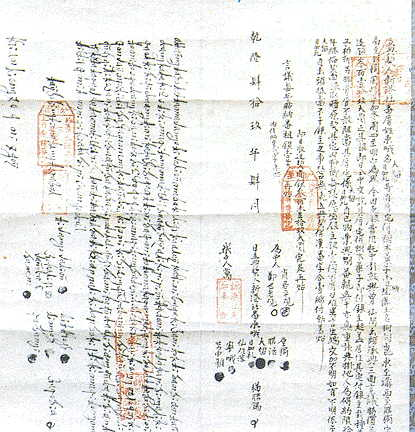
A contract written in both Chinese and the Sinckan language, 1784

The Sinkang Manuscripts (Chinese: 新港文書; pinyin: Xīngǎng wénshū; Wade–Giles: Hsin-kang wen-shu; Pe̍h-ōe-jī: Sin-káng bûn-su; also spelled Sinkang or Sinkan) are a series of leases, mortgages, and other commerce contracts written in the Sinckan (Siraya), Taivoan, and Makatao languages. Among Han Chinese, they are commonly referred to as the "barbarian contracts" (Chinese: 番仔契; pinyin: Fānzǐqì; Pe̍h-ōe-jī: hoan-á-khè). Some are written only in a Latin-based script, considered the first script to be developed in Taiwan itself, while others were bilingual with adjacent Han writing. Currently there are approximately 140 extant documents written in Sinckan; they are important in the study of Siraya and Taivoan culture, and Taiwanese history in general, although there are only a few scholars who can understand them.

== History and background ==
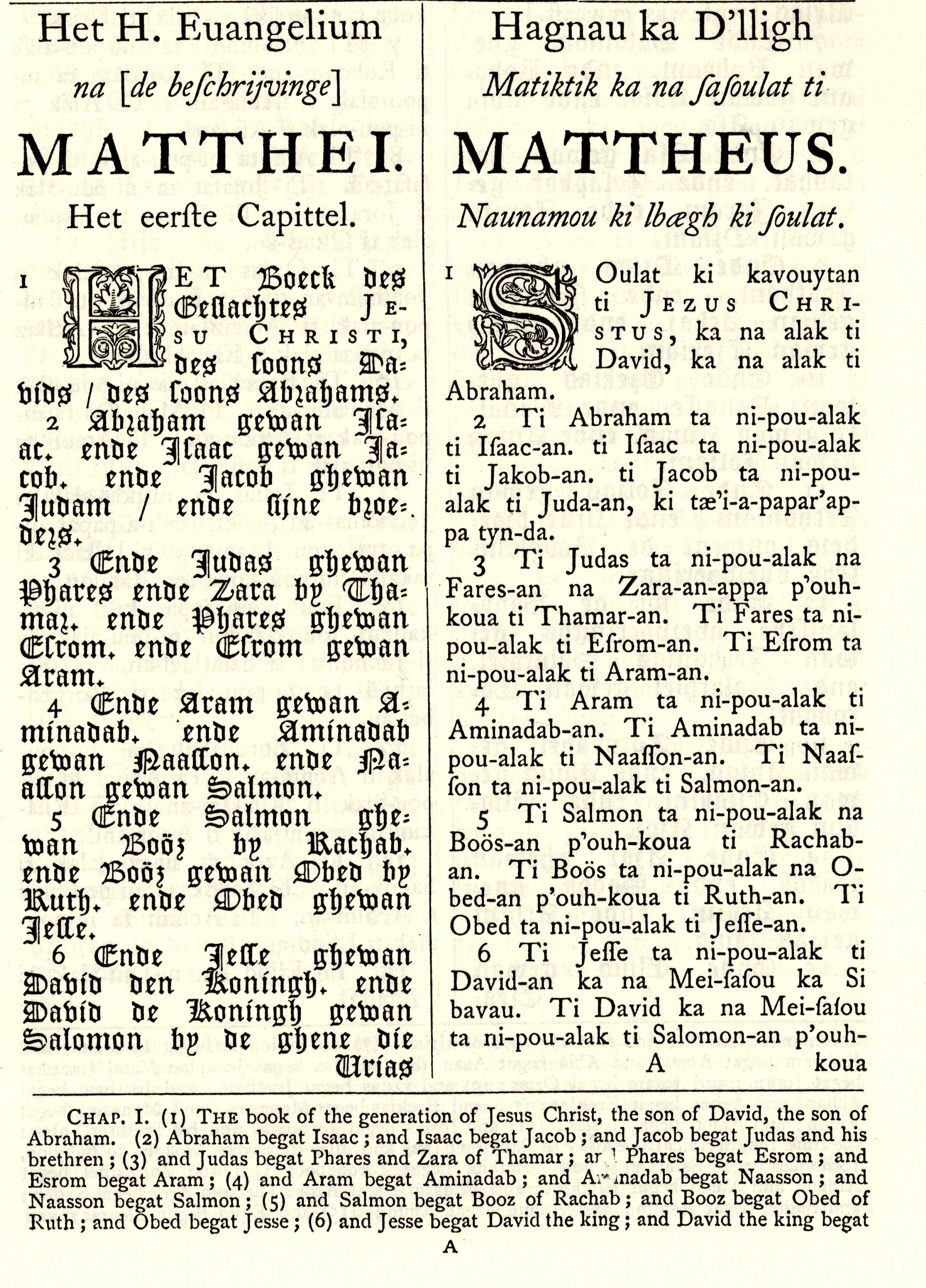
Gospel of St. Matthew in Dutch, Sinckan, Taivoan, and English. Original Dutch and Sinckan above is from 1661 by Daniel Gravius; English in small type was added in 1888 by Scottish missionary William Campbell.

The Sinckan language was spoken by the Siraya people that lived in what is now Tainan. During the time when Taiwan was under the administration of the Dutch East India Company (Dutch Formosa 1624–1662), Dutch missionaries learned Sinckan to facilitate both missionary work and government affairs. They also created a Latin-based script and compiled a dictionary of the language, teaching the natives how to write their own language.

In 1625, Maarten Sonck, the Dutch governor of Taiwan, requested that the Netherlands send two to three missionaries to Taiwan for the purpose of converting the natives. However, the first group to arrive were visiting missionaries who did not have the authority to perform baptism rites. It was not until June 1627 that the first real minister, Rev. Georgius Candidius, arrived, upon which missionary work in Taiwan began in earnest. The first area to be targeted, the Sinckan settlement (modern-day Sinshih), had many converts by 1630.

In 1636, the Dutch started a school for the Sinckan that not only featured religious instruction, but also provided schooling in Western literature. Because the Dutch advocated that missionary work be conducted in the native language, the school was taught in the Sinckan language. The missionary Robertus Junius recorded in his 1643 education report that the Sinckan school had enrolled 80 students, of which 24 were learning to write and 8 to 10 had solid penmanship, while in neighboring Baccaluan (modern-day Anding) school there were 90 students, of which 8 knew how to write.

Aside from proselytizing, the missionaries also compiled dictionaries and books of religious doctrine; they translated the Gospel of Matthew into Sinckan and also compiled a vocabulary of Favorlang, another aboriginal language. These would become important sources for later research. The most important Sinckan documents were the contracts between the Sinckan and the Han settlers, commonly known as the "barbarian contracts" by Han Chinese.

Although the Dutch only governed Taiwan for 38 years, they greatly influenced the development of indigenous culture. To take the Sinckan Manuscripts as an example, the latest extant documents in the Sinckan script date back to 1813 (more than 150 years after the Dutch left Taiwan in 1662). This is evidence to show that "the arts of reading and writing introduced by the Dutch were handed down from generation to generation by the people themselves."

The script used in these papers, Sinkang romanization, is considered the first domestically developed and first Latin script to be used in Taiwan. However, the manuscripts were not "discovered" by scholars until the nineteenth century.

Shortly after the founding of Taihoku Imperial University in 1928, one of the scholars in the linguistics department, Naoyoshi Ogawa (小川尚義), gathered together a number of old texts in Tainan. In 1931, Naojirō Murakami (村上直次郎) edited and published them under the title The Sinckan Manuscripts. The compilation contained 109 contracts, of which 87 were from the Sinckan settlement; 21 of those were bilingual in Han characters and Sinckan.

Joseph Beal Steere, an anthropologist and a professor at the University of Michigan, had stored 15 manuscripts at the university's Museum of Anthropology, which were found again and archived by 1999.

The "Deeds of the Qing Dynasty Sinkang Society Fan Fu Wang Lanmo and Others" (清代新港社番婦王覽莫等立典契) was an assemblage of Sinkang manuscripts, collected by the Kaohsiung Museum of History. They were designated as important antiquities by the Cultural Construction Committee of the Executive Yuan of the Republic of China (now the Ministry of Culture) in 2008.

== Bibliography ==
- Campbell, William (1903). "Explanatory Notes". Formosa under the Dutch: described from contemporary records, with explanatory notes and a bibliography of the island. London: Kegan Paul. ISBN 978-957-638-083-9. LCCN 04007338.
- Campbell, William; Gravius, Daniel (1888). The Gospel of St. Matthew in Formosan (Sinkang dialect) with corresponding versions in Dutch and English (in Siraya, Dutch, and English). London: Trubner. OCLC 844610148.
- Davidson, James W. (1903). The Island of Formosa, Past and Present : history, people, resources, and commercial prospects : tea, camphor, sugar, gold, coal, sulphur, economical plants, and other productions. London and New York: Macmillan. OCLC 1887893. OL 6931635M.
- Chiung, Wi-vun Taiffalo (2005). 語言, 認同與去殖民 [Language, Identity and Decolonization] (in Chinese (Taiwan), Taiwanese Hokkien, and English). National Cheng Kung University. ISBN 978-957-8845-85-5.
- Lai, Sufen Sophia (2008-05-22). "Chinese in Taiwan". In Rosenhouse, Judith; Kowner, Rotem (eds.). Globally Speaking: Motives for Adopting English Vocabulary in Other Languages. Multilingual Matters. pp. 227–250. ISBN 978-1-78309-153-9.
- Li, Paul Jen-kuei (December 2002). "新發現十五件新港文書的初步解讀" [Preliminary Interpretations of the 15 Recently Uncovered Sinkang Manuscripts]. Taiwan Historical Research (in Chinese and English). 9 (2). Academia Sinica: 1–68.
