= Li Renji =

Taiwanese elder and priest (1919–2001)

Li Renji (1919-February 8, 2001) was an aunt of Jibei in Dongshan District, Tainan, Taiwan.

Li Renji was a representative of the previous generation of aunts, serving as a local elder and priest at the Altar of Ali-zu. She serves as a bridge between humans and gods in the beliefs of the Pingpu ethnic group. From the documentary, it is learned that she is not a dignified clergyman in Christianity, nor a revered monk in Buddhism. Aunt Li Renji's language and hobbies are approachable, such as when the people do not listen during festivals, Aunt Li will loudly shout out the Three Character Scriptures, or she always keeps smoking due to uncontrollable addiction.

== Early life ==
In 1919, Li Renji was born in the Jibeishao tribe.

In 1936, when Li Renji was eighteen, she was selected by "Ali-zu" as his subordinate, meaning Alimu will appear at her window wearing white clothes or in her dreams. Li Renji's parents initially opposed Li Renji's role as the concubine. She also resisted and did not understand the rituals of the ceremony. However, she suddenly understood once she went to the grand palace to worship Ali Mu.

Beginning in 1937, Ali Mu appeared theophany for more than two years; during this period, Li Renji only relied on drinking water to maintain normal body function.

In 1940, Li Renji married Luo Yiji; soon after, the tribe's aunt died, and Li Renji began to take over her work. From then on, Li Renji had to "Poe divination" to ask Alimu for permission before leaving home. New moon and fifteenth day of each month, he cleaned the Kong-kài, changed the water and green for Alimu's pots and jars, and then offered the Areca catechu and performed the "three-way ceremony". On weekdays, Li Renji would also stay at his residence to perform a surprise ceremony for the believers or use a "thank you basket" to send a sacrificial vase (the incarnation of Alimu) to various places to "do things" for the believers to solve their complicated diseases.

In 1959, Li Renji became a full-time aunt after giving birth to her eighth child. Li Renji married Luo Yiji and had three sons and five daughters.

== Alimu's punishment ==
In the early days, the aunt had to go to the Kong-kài's house to change the green (replace the Zelan on the sacrificial pot) on the first and fifteenth day of each month. Once, when the tribe went on a collective trip to the north, Li Renji asked others to clean it up. As a result, he felt unwell in Taipei and was not getting better even after being sent to the hospital. The tribe members quickly took him back to Jibei, and Li Renji was fine as soon as he got on the expressway on the way back. Subsequently, Auntie went to Kaohsiung to deal with the situation at the client's home. After Alimu came to the spirit, she did not start the ceremony directly. Auntie yelled: "I love playing so much", and slapped herself for several minutes. It was Alimu who punished and scolded Li Renji. Assistant Li Zhulong quickly apologized and begged Ali's mother, and Li Renji, who was in a spiritual state, stopped slapping himself in the mouth.

== Later life and death ==
Old age, Li Renji continued to host important festivals in Jibei, such as the Night Festival and the Roaring Sea Festival (Howling Sea Festival). At 16:00 on February 8, 2001, Li Renji died due to myocardial infarctions.

Legend has it that Li Renji could only live to be seventy-eight years old, but Ali-zu needed her to continue working, so she extended her life by five years. Li Renji had just passed the age of eighty-three. He suddenly collapsed while walking in the courtyard of his residence. This was consistent with what he had said during his lifetime that he would live until eighty-three. Therefore, the tribe members believed that he had completed his mission and was recalled by Ali-zu. As for the succession, Regarding the human issue, Li Renji said: "It is not up to me to decide who will be my aunt in the future. If Ali's mother wants to find someone, she has to inform heaven and earth to investigate the person's behaviour."

== In popular culture ==
Mu Zhi·Long Yao, "Ji Bei Shuo and Ping Pu Grandma" (2000)
