= Taivoan =

Taivoan or Taivuan may refer to:

- the Taivoan people
- the Taivoan language
