= 馬卡道 =

馬卡道 may refer to the following Chinese character in Taiwan:

- Makadao light rail station (馬卡道站), a light rail station of Circular light rail
- Makatao people, an indigenous people in Taiwan
