= Language policy in Taiwan during martial law =

During the martial law period in Taiwan, a Mandarin monolingual policy was implemented in Taiwan by the Kuomintang (Nationalist Party of China). The policy was formulated as a political goal to unite the island. However, the demotion of prior local languages into "dialects" across cultural and educational landscapes resulted in a pushback of the policy and eventually rescinded as Taiwan democratized.

== Background ==
Prior to the martial law, Taiwan was ruled as a Japanese colony from 1895 to 1945. During the rule, the Japanese colonizers imposed a policy of Japanization, including a monolingual policy. The policy was initially nonmandatory, but quickly escalated towards the end of World War II in order to turn Taiwan into a military base. However, the ban of native languages in the Japanese monolingual policy lasted for only a few years within the war period. Most of the native population had not been significantly affected and were still bilingual.

Among the native population during the Japanese occupation, the native Taiwanese population consisted of indigenous people, the Hoklo, and the Hakka.

- Austronesian Taiwanese have lived in Taiwan for nearly 5000 years. Across the 14 recognized tribes, they speak about 12 languages across three major language groups — Atayalic in the north, Tsouic in the central area, and Paiwan in the southeast.
- The Hoklo Taiwanese (aka Minnan) arrived in Taiwan from the Southern Fujian around the 17th Century and are considered the first immigrants of Taiwan. The ethnic language used by the Hoklo is Hokkien. The version spoken in Taiwan is more widely called Taigi or Taioan-oe. Overtime, Hoklo began to be classified as part of the "local population" and became the most spoken language after over 200 years of coexistence with the Austronesian languages.
- The Hakka Taiwanese immigrated to Taiwan during the 17th Century after the Hoklo. The name "Hakka" means guest in Chinese, which is a reference to the continuing migration over history that led to the formation of Hakka. There are two main Hakka forms spoken in Taiwan, which are the Sixian and Hoiliuk. Because the two groups of Hakka settled in different areas of Taiwan, they did not mix as much in their languages compared to the Hoklo.

After Japan's defeat in World War II, Taiwan was surrendered to the Chinese government, specifically the KMT-administered regime. However, four years later, the KMT lost the civil war to the Chinese Communist Party (CCP) and fled to Taiwan for refuge. A large number of Chinese immigrants who spoke Mandarin became the administrators and policymakers of the island. However, most of the Taiwanese who resided in Taiwan prior to the KMT-rule do not understand standard Mandarin due to the "Japanization" during the Japanese colonial rule. A language difference was apparent between the political elites and the mass public. Furthermore, with the lack of historical experiences, tensions were very high between the native Taiwanese people and the Mandarin-speaking people.

== National Language Policy ==
The KMT's goal of the monolingual policy was for de-Japanization and national unity. For the KMT, any previous local elites were excluded from power because of the KMT's distrust of "Japanized" elites. Especially after fifty years of Japanese colonization and the experience of war, the native Taiwanese, especially the younger generation, had gained more Japanese cultural characteristics. However, the KMT and mainlanders had experienced war against the Japanese, making them hostile to any Japanese influences. Under the policy, Japanese, local, and indigenous languages were deemed illegal in the public sector. Mandarin was instead promoted as the new, national language. Mandarin promotion groups were created to teach the indigenous people as they were considered "primitive." Language workshops, educational reforms, and the standardization of traditional Chinese characters were created to support the monolingual policy. In schools, students were fined, hit, or forced to wear a placard if caught speaking a "local dialect". When television was introduced, any airing using native language was strictly prohibited or framed as a language to ridicule.

Any other languages other than Mandarin were demoted as "dialects" and socially labeled as unpatriotic to the greater public. Although the different dialects may not be as visible as the Minnan, Hakkas, and the Mainlanders were ethnically Han Chinese, the language, self-identity, and interpretations of history has created invisible ethnic cleavages. Mainlanders were initially discriminated against by the native Taiwanese in fear of the political elites taking over business ownership and were reluctant to hire Mainlanders. Such discrimination was primarily perpetuated by requiring job applicants to speak proficient Minnan. The linguistic separation became more divided when Mainlanders were less willing to learn the local languages due to residential segregation and a lack of practical opportunities to use the language. By speaking Mandarin, the KMT government was attempting to unite Taiwan linguistically with the rest of China. The policy was a plan to encourage and promote mutual understandings between the Mainlanders and the local Taiwanese population. Moreover, the KMT had a greater ambition to display patriotism through standardizing Mandarin as a means to prove that the Republic of China is more superior and united than the newly established People's Republic of China.

== Erosion of the language policy ==
The demarcation of prior languages as inferior dialects heavily stirred anti-KMT sentiments among the local population. By wielding military power, political domination, and cultural hegemony, the KMT helped solidify the indigenous, Hokkien, and Minnan native identity, which led to anti-Mainlander ethnic nationalism. Without any formal course or opportunity to speak local languages, many speakers of the local languages began to degenerate across the younger generations. However, because income inequality forced many of the Native populations to work in labor without much job mobility, many Minnan and Hokkien speakers were still able to communicate in their mother tongue. Pockets began to develop among the Hakka, Minna, and indigenous groups where they would hold secret meetings to practice and teach themselves their own languages. Hence, rather than building mutual trust, the demolition of various group's mother tongues increased the tensions between the Mainlanders and the local groups. Through both political and cultural movements, the KMT then began to lift the language bans.

=== Political influence ===
After 1987, the KMT began to change the island's political landscape by transitioning away from martial law to a full democracy. As a democratic institution, politicians were compelled and incentivized to reach out to the local populations in order to gain votes. During Taiwan's first democratic presidential election, Lee Teng-hui spoke Minnan during his presidential campaign in 1996. Not only was Lee a native Taiwanese, but as the successor of the KMT he also promoted more native Taiwanese technocrats into high government positions traditionally reserved for Mainlanders. Especially with the Minnan and the Hokkien making up a strong majority of the Taiwanese population, embracing local languages became a political strategy in election campaigns to attract Native voters. Laws and regulations began to gradually lift the monolingual policy as the island began to transition towards a democracy. For example, in November 1987, three government-controlled television stations began to broadcast news in Minnan.

=== Cultural influence ===
As politicians began to use languages in campaign speeches and loosen up the language policies, the cultural view towards language began to change too. Being multilingual became a celebration of diversity and framed as resources that reflect a Taiwanese cultural identity. The shift in attitude has been referred to as a time of "Taiwanisation" as it attempts to rectify the wrongdoings of the past. Furthermore, in 1993, the Interior Ministry apologized for repressive language policy of the past and declared that it had been a mistake. A language equity law was passed to create a legal foundation of equal treatment of languages and nativist languages are transitioning into schools. Efforts in validating the Minnan, Hakka, and indigenous identity in the public sphere is still an ongoing process through education outreaches.

In Taiwan, the movement towards adopting Mandarin as the lingua franca language is still apparent. The conflict in KMT Chinese nationalism and Taiwanese nationalism remains because of the irreversibility of the assimilation policy. Presently, people have accepted the results of the national language policy as the remnant of a colonial language. Especially with Taiwan's current ambiguous national status, people are uncertain on the course of reversing the 50 years of acquired Modern Written Chinese and Han characters.
