= Taivoan language =

Formosan language

Taivoan
- Rara ka maka-Taivoan
- Pronunciation: [taivu'an]
- Native to: Taiwan
- Region: Southwestern, around present-day Tainan, Kaohsiung. Also among some migration communities along Huatung Valley.
- Ethnicity: Taivoan
- Extinct: end of 19th century
- Revival: revitalization movement
- Language family: Austronesian: East Formosan; Sirayaic; Taivoan–Makatao; Taivoan
- Writing system: Latin (Sinckan Manuscripts), Han characters (traditional)

Language codes
- ISO 639-3: tvx
- Glottolog: taiv1237
- Linguasphere: 30-FAA-bb
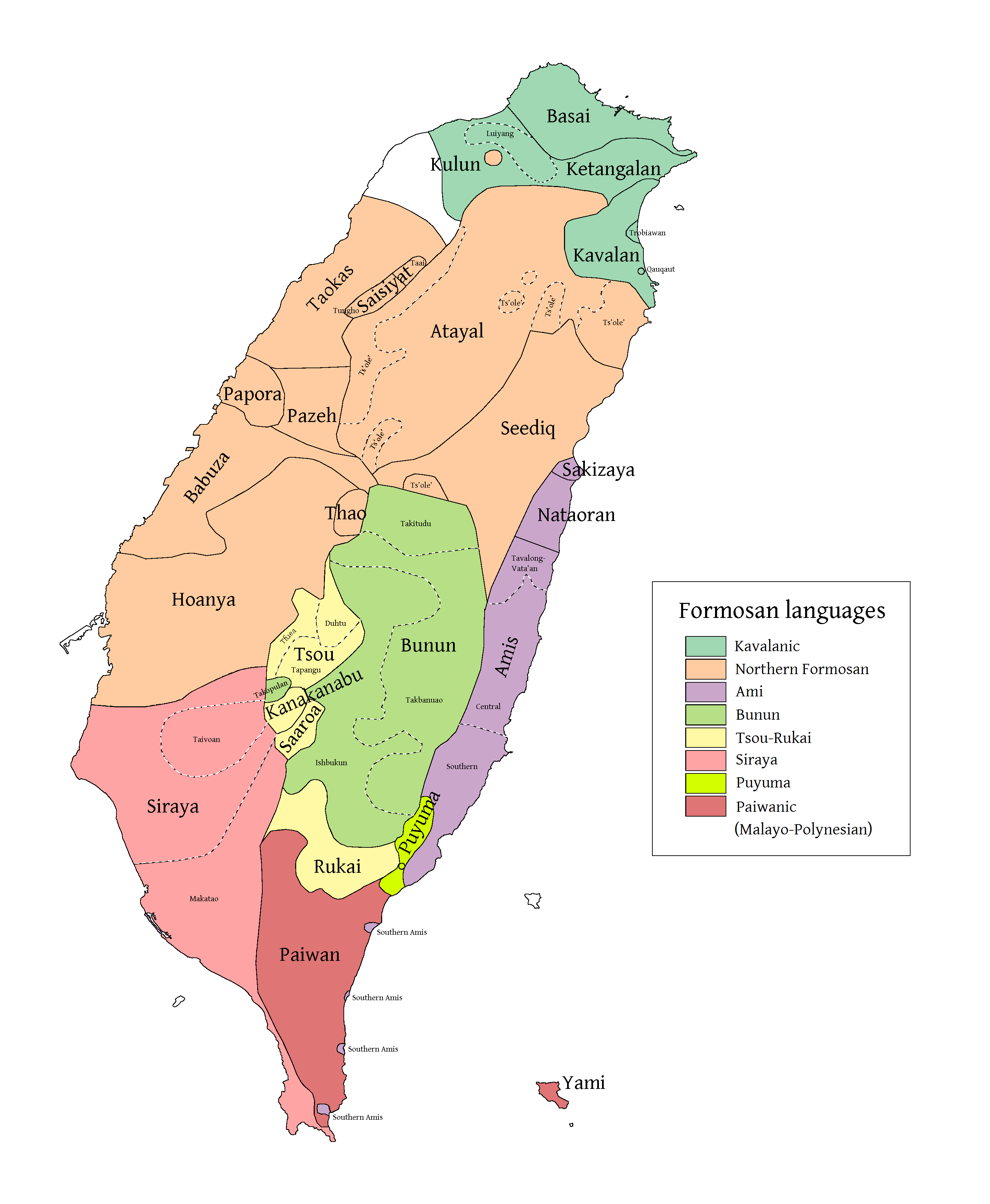
- (pink) Taivoan
- Coordinates: 23°06′N 120°27′E

Taivoan or Taivuan, is a Formosan language spoken until the end of the 19th century by the indigenous Taivoan people of Taiwan. Taivoan used to be regarded as a dialect of Siraya, but now more evidence has shown that they should be classified as separate languages. The corpora previously regarded as Siraya like the Gospel of St. Matthew and the Notes on Formulary of Christianity translated into "Siraya" by the Dutch people in the 17th century should be in Taivoan majorly.

Since the January 2019 code release, SIL International has recognized Taivoan as an independent language and assigned the code tvx.

== Classification ==
The Taivoan language used to be regarded as a dialect of Siraya. However, more evidences have shown that it belongs to an independent language spoken by the Taivoan people.

=== Documentary evidence ===
In De Dagregisters van het Kasteel Zeelandia written by the Dutch colonizers during 1629–1662, it was clearly said that when the Dutch people would like to speak to the chieftain of Cannacannavo (Kanakanavu), they needed to translate from Dutch to Sinckan (Siraya), from Sinckan to Tarroequan (possibly a Paiwan or a Rukai language), from Tarroequan to Taivoan, and from Taivoan to Cannacannavo.

"...... in Cannacannavo: Aloelavaos tot welcken de vertolckinge in Sinccans, Tarrocquans en Tevorangs geschiede, weder voor een jaer aengenomen" — De Dagregisters van het Kasteel Zeelandia, pp.6–8

According to William Campbell's Formosa Under the Dutch (1903), historical records show that various displaced indigenous groups "spoke several languages in the same place." Despite this linguistic diversity, populations including the Taivoan ("Tevorangians") were forced to mechanically memorize the Sinckan catechism by heart:

"It also often occurred that people living among the mountains were enticed by all possible means to come down and live in the valleys or plains. The people thus got mixed, and spoke several languages in the same place; one result being that, in keeping with the usual routine, those persons learnt the catechism of Mr. Junius by heart; but, while doing so, they acted just like magpies in repeating what has been said to them. And yet, people of this type received baptism; for Mr. Gravius informed us that he had met several Tevorangians who had been baptized under those unusual conditions. "— Formosa Under the Dutch, p.241

=== Linguistic evidence ===
A comparison of numerals of Siraya, Taivoan (Tevorangh dialect), and Makatao (Kanapo dialect) with Proto-Austronesian language show the difference among the three Austronesian languages in southwestern Taiwan in the early 20th century:

	PAn	Proto-Siraya	Siraya			Mattauw	Taivoan			Makatao	
	PAn	Proto-Siraya	UM (Note: Based on the Siraya vocabulary found in the Utrecht Manuscript written in the 17th century.)	Gospel (Note: Based on the Siraya vocabulary found in the Gospel of St. Matthew written in the 17th century.)	Kongana (Note: Attested in Siraya's Kongana community in the early 20th century.)	Mattauw	Tevorangh (Note: Attested among Tevorangh-Taivoan communities, including Siaolin, Alikuan, and Kahsianpoo, in the early 20th century.)	Siaurie (Note: Attested mainly in Suannsamna.)	Eastern (Note: Attested mainly in Dazhuang.)	Kanapo (Note: Attested in Makatao's Kanapo community in the early 20th century.)	Bankim
1	*asa	*saat	sa-sat	saat	sasaat	isa	cahaʼ	saʼa	cacaʼa	na-saad	saat
2	*duSa	*ðusa	sa-soa	ruha	duha	rusa	ruha	zua	raruha	ra-ruha	laluha
3	*telu	*turu	tu-turo	turo	turu	tao	toho	too	tatoo	ra-ruma	taturu
4	*Sepat	*səpat	pa-xpat	xpat	tapat	usipat	pahaʼ	sipat, gasipat	tapat	ra-sipat	hapat
5	*lima	*rǐma	ri-rima	rima	tu-rima	hima	hima	rima, urima	tarima	ra-lima	lalima
6	*enem	*nəm	ni-nam	nnum	tu-num	lomu	lom	rumu, urumu	tanum	ra-hurum	anum
7	*pitu	*pitu	pi-pito	pito	pitu	pitu	kitoʼ	pitoo, upitoo	tyausen	ra-pito	papitu
8	--- *walu	*kuixpa ---	kuxipat ---	kuixpa ---	pipa ---	vao ---	kipaʼ ---	--- waru, uwaru	rapako	--- ra-haru	tuda
9	--- *Siwa	*ma-tuda ---	matuda ---	matuda ---	kuda ---	siva ---	matuha ---	--- hsiya	ravasen	--- ra-siwa	---
10	---	*-ki tian	keteang	kitian	keteng	masu	kaipien	---	kaiten	ra-kaitian	saatitin

In 2009, Li (2009) further proved the relationship among the three languages, based on the latest linguistic observations below:

	PAn	Siraya	Taivoan	Makatao
Sound change (1)	*l	r	Ø~h	r
Sound change (2)	*N	l	l	n
Sound change (3)	*D, *d	s	r, d	r, d
Sound change (4)	*k *S	-k- -g-	Ø Ø	-k- ----
Morphological change (suffices for future tense)		-ali	-ah	-ani

Some examples include:

	PAn	Siraya	Taivoan	Makatao	
Sound change (1)	*telu	turu	toho	toru	three
Sound change (1)	*lima	rima	hima	rima	five, hand
Sound change (1)	*zalan	darang	laʼan	raran	road
Sound change (1)	*Caŋila	tangira	tangiya	tangira	ear
Sound change (1)	*bulaN	vural	buan	buran	moon
Sound change (1)	*luCuŋ	rutong	utung	roton	monkey
Sound change (1)		ruvog	uvok, huvok	ruvok	cooked rice
Sound change (1)		karotkot	kau	akuwan	river
Sound change (1)		mirung	miʼunʼun	mirun	to sit
Sound change (1)		meisisang	maiyan	mairang	big
Sound change (1)		mururau	moʼowao, mowaowao	-----	to sing
Sound change (2)	*ma-puNi	mapuli	mapuri	mapuni	white
Sound change (2)		tawil	tawin	tawin	year
Sound change (2)		maliko	maniku	maneku	sleep, lie down
Sound change (2)		maling	manung	bimalong	dream
Sound change (2)	*qaNiCu	litu	anito	ngitu	ghost
Sound change (2)		paila	paila	paina	buy
Sound change (2)		ko	kuri, kuli	koni	I
Sound change (3)	*Daya	saya	daya	raya	east
Sound change (3)	*DaNum	salom	rarum	ralum	water
Sound change (3)	*lahud	raus	raur	ragut, alut	west
Sound change (3)		sapal	rapan, hyapan	tikat	leg
Sound change (3)		pusux	purux	-----	country
Sound change (3)		sa	ra, da	ra, da	and
Sound change (3)		kising	kilin	kilin	spoon
Sound change (3)		hiso	hiro	-----	if
Sound change (4)	*kaka	kaka	aka	aka	elder siblings
Sound change (4)		ligig	liʼih	niʼi	sand
Sound change (4)		matagi-vohak	mataʼi-vohak	-----	to regret
Sound change (4)		akusey	kasay	asey	not have
Sound change (4)		Tarokay	Taroay	Tarawey	(personal name)

Based on the discovery, Li attempted two classification trees:

1. Tree based on the number of phonological innovations

- Sirayaic
  - Taivoan
  - Siraya–Makatao
    - Siraya
    - Makatao

2. Tree based on the relative chronology of sound changes

- Sirayaic
  - Siraya
  - Taivoan–Makatao
    - Taivoan
    - Makatao

Li (2009) considers the second tree (the one containing the Taivoan–Makatao group) to be the somewhat more likely one.

=== Criticism against Candidius' famous assertion ===
Taivoan was considered by some scholars as a dialectal subgroup of the Siraya ever since George Candidius included "Tefurang" in the eight Siraya villages which he claimed all had "the same manners, customs and religion, and speak the same language." However, American linguist Raleigh Ferrell reexaminates the Dutch materials and says "it appear that the Tevorangians were a distinct ethnolinguistic group, differing markedly in both language and culture from the Siraya." Ferrell mentions that, given that Candidius asserted that he was well familiar with the eight supposed Siraya villages including Tevorang, it's extremely doubtful that he ever actually visited the latter: "it is almost certain, in any case, that he had not visited Tevorang when he wrote his famous account in 1628. The first Dutch visit to Tevorang appears to have been in January 1636 [...]"

Lee (2015) regards that, when Siraya was a lingua franca among at least eight indigenous communities in southwestern Taiwan plain, Taivoan people from Tevorangh, who has been proved to have their own language in "De Dagregisters van het Kasteel Zeelandia", might still need the translation service from Wanli, a neighbor community that shared common hunting field and also a militarily alliance with Tevorangh.

Li noted in his "The Lingue Franche in Taiwan" that, Siraya exerted its influence over neighbouring languages in the southwestern plains in Taiwan, including Taivoan to the east and Makatao to the South in the 17th century, and became lingua franca in the whole area.

== Phonology ==
The following is the phonology of the language:

=== Vowels ===
	Front	Central	Back
Close	i ⟨i, y⟩		u ⟨u⟩
Mid	e ⟨e⟩	ə ⟨e⟩	
Open	a ⟨a⟩		o ⟨o⟩

=== Consonants ===
		Bilabial	Dental	Alveolar	Palatal	Velar	Glottal
Nasal		m ⟨m⟩	n ⟨n⟩			ŋ ⟨ng⟩	
Plosive	voiceless	p ⟨p⟩		t ⟨t⟩		k ⟨k⟩	ʔ ⟨ʼ⟩
Plosive	voiced	b ⟨b⟩		d ⟨d⟩		ɡ ⟨g⟩	
Fricative	voiceless	f ⟨f⟩	s ⟨s⟩			x ⟨x⟩	h ⟨h⟩
Fricative	voiced	v ⟨v⟩	z ⟨z⟩				
Affricate	unaspirated			t͡s ⟨c⟩			
Affricate	aspirated			t͡sʰ ⟨ts⟩			
Liquid	rhotic			r ⟨r⟩			
Liquid	lateral			l ⟨l⟩			
Approximant		w ⟨w⟩			j ⟨y⟩		

It is likely that there were no /g/, /ts/, and /tsʰ/ in the 17th–19th century Taivoan, although Adelaar claims c preceding i or y be sibilant or affricate and so could be /ts/ or /ʃ/. However, the three sounds appeared after the 20th century, especially in Tevorangh dialect in Siaolin, Alikuan, and Dazhuang, and also in some words in Vogavon dialect in Lakku, for example:

- /ɡ/: agang /aˈɡaŋ/ (crab), ahagang /ahaˈɡaŋ/ or agagaʼ /aɡaˈɡaʔ/ (red), gupi /ɡuˈpi/ (Jasminum nervosum Lour.), Anag /aˈnaɡ/ (the Taivoan Highest Ancestral Spirit), kogitanta agisen /koɡitanˈta aɡiˈsən/ (the Taivoan ceremonial tool to worship the Highest Ancestral Spirits), magun /maˈɡun/ (cold), and agicin /aɡit͡sin/ or agisen /aɡisən/ (bamboo fishing trap).
- /t͡s/: icikang /it͡siˈkaŋ/ (fish), vawciw /vawˈt͡siw/ (Hibiscus taiwanensis Hu), cawla /t͡sawˈla/ (Lysimachia capillipes Hemsl.), ciwla /t͡siwˈla/ (Clausena excavata Burm. f.), and agicin /aɡit͡sin/ (bamboo fishing trap). The sound also clearly appears in a recording of the typical Taivoan ceremonial song "Kalawahe" sung by Taivoan in Lakku that belongs to Vogavon dialect.

The digraph ts recorded in the early 20th century may represent /t͡sʰ/ or /t͡s/:

- /t͡sʰ/ or /t͡s/: matsa (door, gate), tabutsuk (spear), tsakitsak (arrow), matsihaha (to laugh), tsukun (elbow), atsipi (a sole of the foot), tsau (dog). Only one word is attested in Vogavon dialect in Lakku: katsui (pants, trousers).

Some scholars in Formosan languages suggest it is not likely that /t͡sʰ/ and /t͡s/ appear in a Formosan language simultaneously, and therefore ts may well represent /t͡s/ as c does, not /t͡sʰ/.

=== Stress ===
It is hard to tell the actual stressing system of Taivoan in the 17th–19th century, as it has been a dormant language for nearly a hundred years. However, since nearly all the existing Taivoan words but the numerals pronounced by the elders fall on the final syllable, there has been a tendency to stress on the final syllable in modern Taivoan for language revitalization and education, compared to modern Siraya that the penultimate syllable is stressed.

== Grammar ==
=== Pronouns ===
The Taivoan personal pronouns are listed below with all the words without asterisk being attested in corpora in the 20th century :

Type of Pronoun	Independent	Nominative	Genitive	Oblique
1s	iau	kuri	-ku	iyaw-an
2s	imhu	ko	-ho	imhu-an
3s	*teni	*ta teni	-tin	*tini-an
1p.i	*imita	kita	*-(m)ita	*imita-n
1p.e	*imian	*kame	*-(m)ian	*imian-an
2p	imomi	kamo, kama	*-(m)omi	imomi-an
3p	*naini	*ta naini	-nin	*naini-an

== Numerals ==
Taivoan has a decimal numeral system as following:

Taivoan Numerals
1	tsahaʼ	11	saka
2	ruha	12	bazun
3	toho	13	kuzun
4	pahaʼ	14	langlang
5	hima	15	linta
6	lom	16	takuba
7	kitoʼ	17	kasin
8	kipaʼ	18	kumsim
9	matuha	19	tabatak
10	kaipien	20	kaitian
Examples of higher numerals
30	tu-tuhu kaipien		
60	lo-lom kaipien		
99	matuha kaipien ab ki matuha		
100	kaʼatuxan		
4,000	pahaʼ katununan		
5,000	hima katununan		

== Examples ==
=== Words and phrases ===
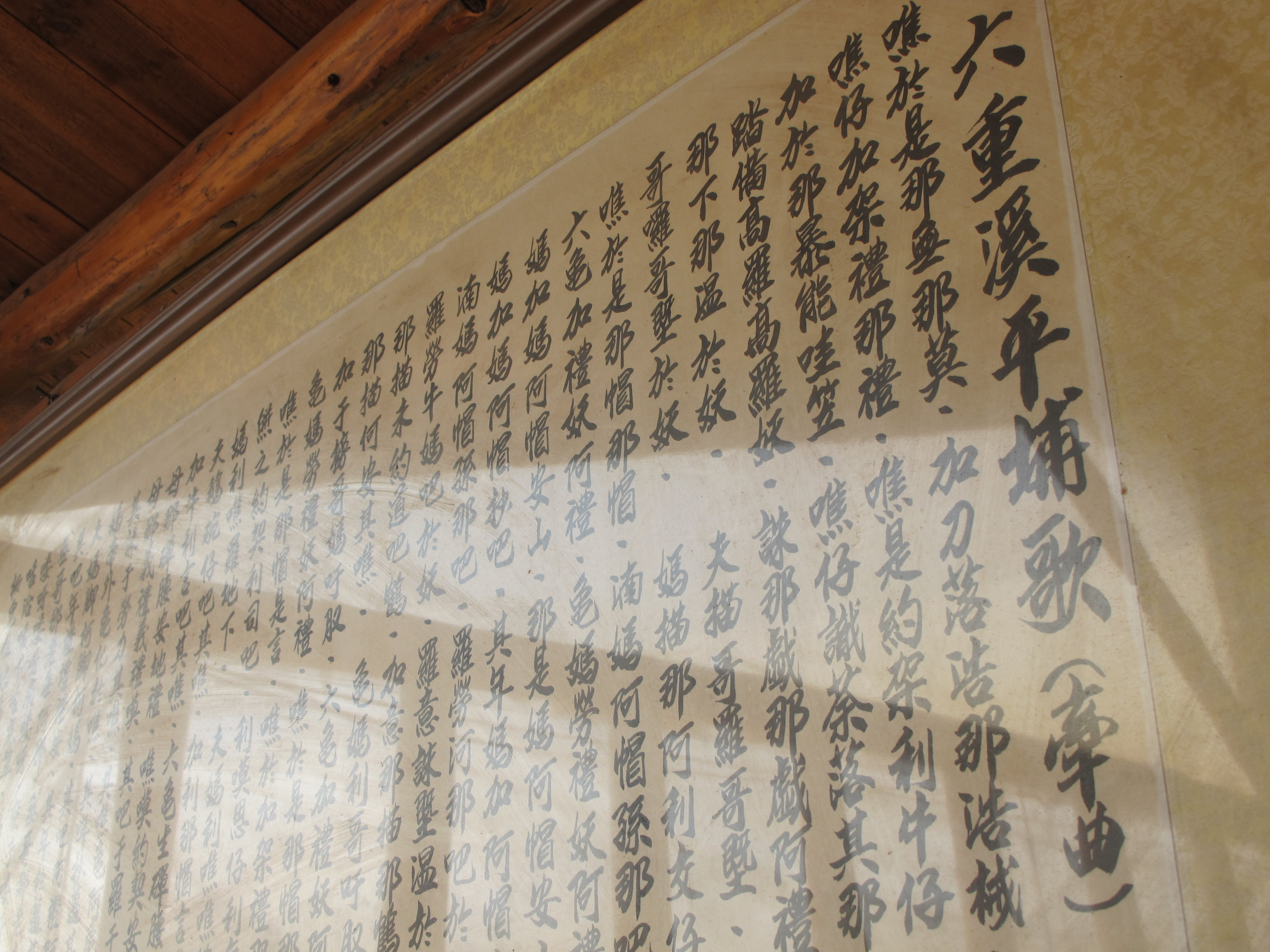
Taivoan ritual song spelled in Chinese characters in Liuchongxi, Tainan.

Some Taivoan people in remote communities like Siaolin, Alikuan, Laolong, Fangliao, and Dazhuang, especially the elders, still use some Taivoan words nowadays, such as miunun "welcome" (originally "please be seated"), mahanru (in Siaolin, Alikuan), makahanru (in Laolong) "thank you", "goodbye" (originally "beautiful"), tapakua "wait a moment".

=== Songs ===
Many Taivoan songs have been recorded and some ceremonial songs like "Kalawahe" and "Taboro" are still sung during every Night Ceremony annually. Some examples are:

==== Kalawahe (or "the Song out of the Shrine") ====
Wa-he. Manie, he mahanru e, he kalawahe, wa-he.
Talaloma e, he talaloma e, he kalawahe, wa-he.
Tamaku e, he tamaku e, he kalawahe, wa-he.
Saviki e, he saviki e, he kalawahe, wa-he.
Rarom he, he rarom he, he kalawahe, wa-he.

==== Panga (or "the Song of Offerings") ====
Ho i he, rarom mahanru ho i he, rarom taipanga ho i he.
Ho i he, hahu mahanru ho i he, hahu taipanga ho i he.
Ho i he, hana mahanru ho i he, hana taipanga ho i he.
Ho i he, saviki mahanru ho i he, saviki taipanga ho i he.
Ho i he, iruku mahanru ho i he, tuku taipanga ho i he.

== See also ==
- Taivoan people
- Sinckan Manuscripts
