= Ali-zu =

Ali-zu (Chinese: 阿立祖; Pe̍h-ōe-jī: a-li̍p-chó͘: Siraya: alid, aritt) is an assimilated Siraya deity that is worshiped by former plains people in southern Taiwan. This god of fertility has been incorporated into the Han pantheon in some places of Taiwan.
