= Siraya people =

Siraya 西拉雅族
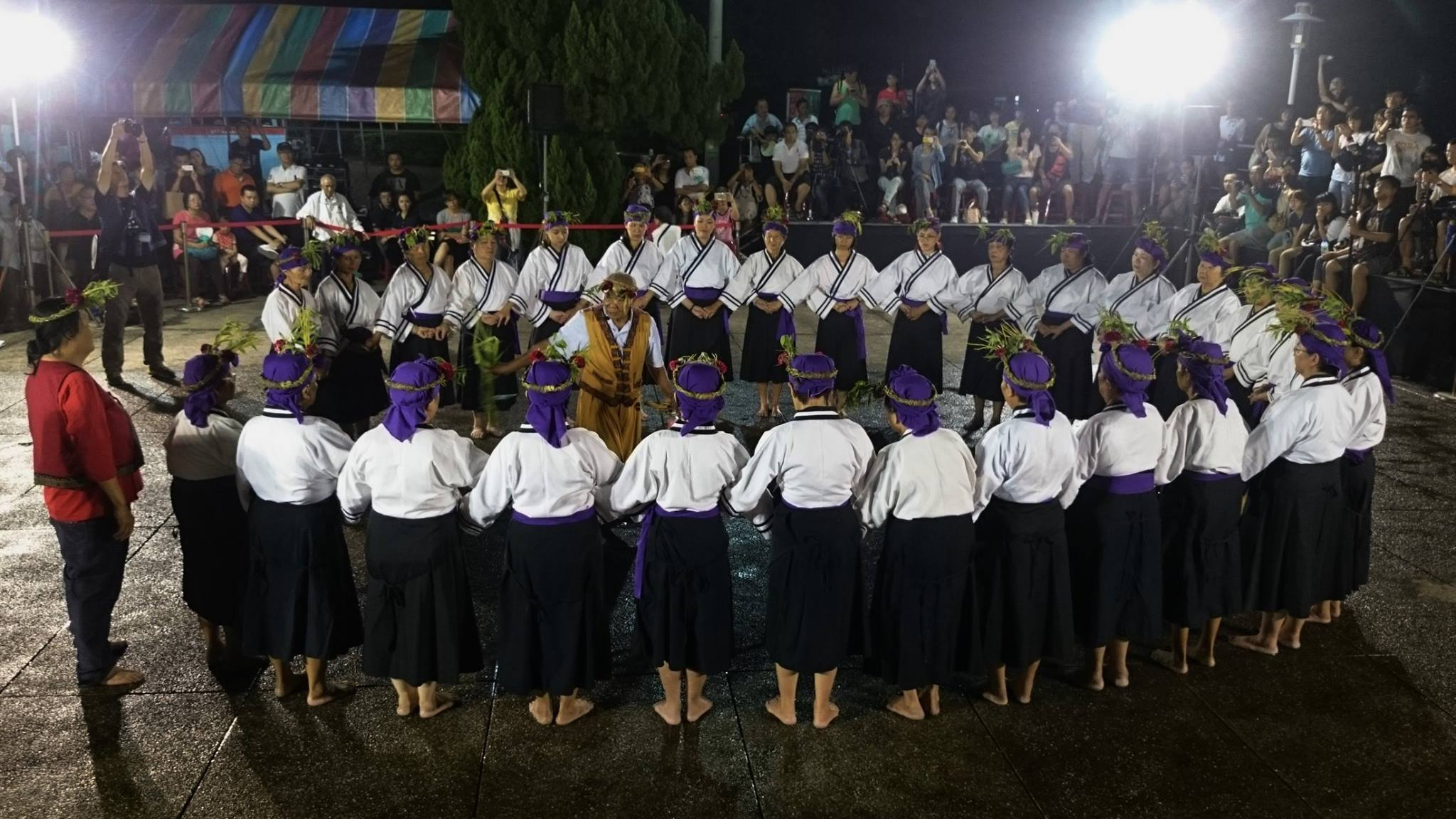
- Night Festival of the Siraya people

Regions with significant populations
- Tainan City and Taitung county (Taiwan)

Languages
- Siraya (formerly), Taiwanese, Mandarin

Religion
- Animism, Buddhism, Christianity, Taoism

Related ethnic groups
- Other Taiwanese Aborigines (Especially Taivoans and Makatao); Hoklo Taiwanese

The Siraya people (Chinese: 西拉雅族; pinyin: Xīlāyǎ Zú) are a Taiwanese indigenous ethnic group. The Siraya settled flat coastal plains in the southwest part of the island of Taiwan and corresponding sections of the east coast; the area is identified today with Tainan and Taitung County. At least four communities comprise the group: Mattauw, Soelangh, Baccloangh, and Sinckan. The first four communities correspond to the modern-day districts of Madou, Jiali, Shanhua, and Sinshih, respectively.

The Siraya are Plains Indigenous peoples, meaning occupants of flat coastal regions rather than mountain areas. Like other indigenous peoples of Taiwan, they are Austronesian peoples. The name "Taiwan" (historically spelt Tayoan, Tayouan or Tayowan, Chinese: 臺員) originated from the Siraya language. The Austronesian languages to which Sirayan belongs includes some of the most widely-spoken languages in Southeast Asia, including Indonesian, Javanese, Tagalog (or standardized as Filipino), and Malay.

Taivoan and Makatao used to be considered Sirayan communities but are now classified as independent peoples based on the latest linguistic discoveries, cultural features, and self-identification.

== Modern history ==
After the port in the Siraya area of Taiwan was annexed in 1683 by Qing Dynasty China, a process of gradual acculturation led to the Siraya language falling out of use. In the 1730s, Siraya children began were assimilated by education and the use of Chinese surnames. The last recorded regular use of the Siraya language was in 1908, after Taiwan was under Japanese rule. The mother tongue of most Siraya families became Taiwanese, a variety of Hokkien, with Japanese and Mandarin Chinese learned in schools as the government-mandated lingua franca.

The Siraya maintained many aspects of their culture despite this. A number of families in the Tso-chen, Kou-pei and Chiou-chen-lin of Sinhua Township in particular still identify themselves as Siraya. The family name Wan (萬), often encountered in the region, is a Chinese transliteration of Talavan, a common Siraya surname. A Siraya Culture Association (台南縣平埔族西拉雅文化協會) was established in 1999. In 2002 the reconstructed Siraya language (see below) began to be taught in schools and used in new literature. In 2005 the Tainan County (now part of Tainan City) government established a Siraya Aboriginal Affairs Committee (台南縣西拉雅原住民族事務委員會) and subsidised a glossary, released in 2008, containing entries for over 4,000 Sirayan words.

Efforts have been under way by the Siraya and related plains aboriginal peoples to gain official recognition from Taiwan's national government. In 2010 the Siraya enlisted the aid of the United Nations. Siraya and Taiwan government representatives have noted a flaw in the language of the law: the Chinese term employed for indigenous peoples literally means "mountain people." A literal reading of the law excludes coastal groups from recognition automatically. Government officials have proposed updating the nomenclature of the legal definition to ensure accuracy and inclusion of all indigenous groups. Siraya gained official recognition on 30 July 2026.

== Culture ==
Traditionally the Siraya lived in villages, which were in constant conflict with one another. Women handled agriculture and religion, while men handled hunting, warfare and decision-making. Married couples did not live together, with the wife living with her parents and the husband living in the men's quarters; if they wanted to see one another, the husband would have to visit in secret. The Siraya were unusual in that most women did not have children until their mid-thirties and if a woman became pregnant before this, an abortion would usually be performed by the village shaman, with most women having multiple abortions during their lifetime. This was because the Siraya held a belief that childbirth and child rearing had an adverse effect on success in warfare, thus childbirth was postponed until the husband retired from being a warrior (generally around age forty), with his wife being a few years younger than him and still having a few years of child-bearing left.

== Language ==
According to the Taiwan Journal, Taiwan's Academia Sinica historians and linguistics announced, on 14 February 2006, that their team of researchers have deciphered up to 80% of the 187 so-called Sinckan Manuscripts (or Sinkang Manuscripts), a set of documents from 17th and 18th centuries written in the language spoken by the Siraya people using a system of romanization introduced by the Dutch in the 17th century. In order to convert the Siraya to Christianity, Dutch missionaries studied the Sirayan language, devised a romanized script in which to record it, taught the Siraya people how to use it, and began translating the New Testament into the Sirayan language. Copies of the Dutch missionaries' translation of the Book of Matthew into Sirayan have survived, and several of the manuscripts are bilingual, with side-by-side Sirayan and Chinese versions of the contents.

== See also ==
- Ali-zu, Sinicized Siraya deity
- Daniel Gravius (1616–1681), Siraya language scholar
- Siraya-class offshore patrol vessel
- Taiwanese art
- Taiwanese indigenous peoples
