= Siraya language =

Extinct Austronesian language of Taiwan

Siraya
- Siraiya
- Native to: Taiwan
- Region: Southwestern, around present-day Tainan
- Extinct: end of 19th century; revitalization movement
- Revival: 2020s
- Language family: Austronesian: East Formosan; Sirayaic; Siraya
- Writing system: Latin (modern Siraya alphabet); Latin (Sinkang Manuscripts)

Language codes
- ISO 639-3: fos
- Glottolog: sira1267 Sirayaic nucl1578 Siraya
- ELP: Siraya
- Linguasphere: 30-FAA-b
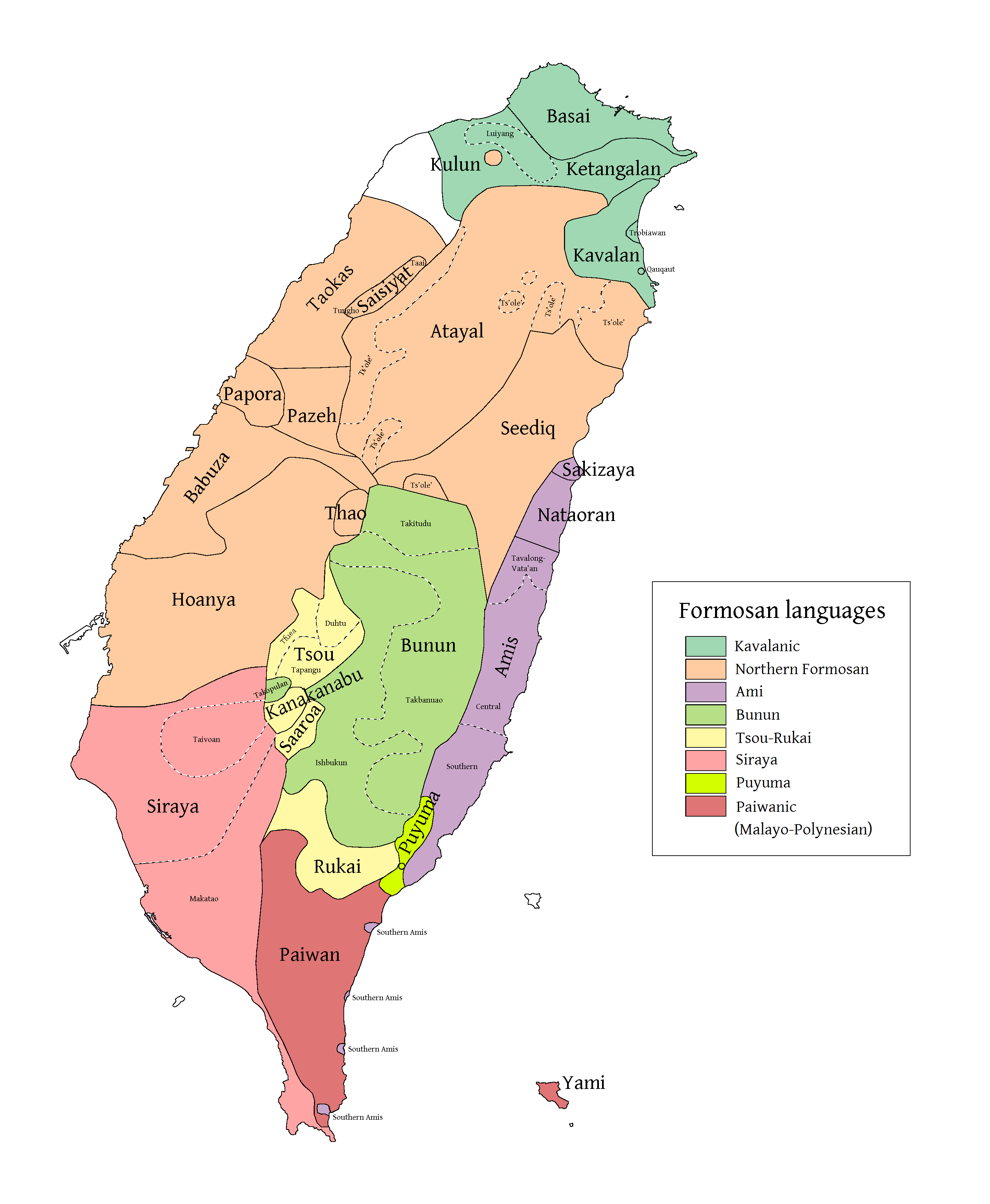
- (pink) Siraya
- Coordinates: 22°58′N 120°18′E

Siraya is a Formosan language spoken until the end of the 19th century by the indigenous Siraya people of Taiwan, derived from Proto-Siraya. Some scholars believe Taivoan and Makatao are two dialects of Siraya, but now more evidence shows that they should be classified as separate languages.

Several Siraya communities have been involved in a Sirayan cultural and language revitalization movement for more than a decade. Through linguistic research and language teaching, Siraya people are learning their ancestors' language, that has been dormant for a century. Today a group of Siraya children in Sinhua District of Tainan particularly in Kou-pei and Chiou Chen Lin area are able to speak and sing in the Siraya language.

== Dialects ==
The Siraya language was previously thought to include three dialects:

- Siraya proper — spoken in the coastal area of Tainan Plain.
- Taivoan — spoken mostly in the inland of Tainan Plain to the north (just west of Southern Tsouic territories).
- Makatao — spoken in Kaohsiung and Pingtung Prefectures to the south (just west of Paiwan territories).

However, more and more evidences have shown that Siraya, Taivoan, and Makatao are three different languages, rather than three dialects, forming the Sirayaic languages.

=== Documentary evidence ===
In "De Dagregisters van het Kasteel Zeelandia" written by the Dutch colonizers during 1629–1662, it was clearly said that when the Dutch people would like to speak to the chieftain of Cannacannavo (Kanakanavu), they needed to translate from Dutch to Sinckan (Siraya), from Sinckan to Tarroequan (possibly a Paiwan or Rukai language), from Tarroequan to Taivoan, and from Taivoan to Cannacannavo.

"...... in Cannacannavo: Aloelavaos tot welcken de vertolckinge in Sinccans, Tarrocquans en Tevorangs geschiede, weder voor een jaer aengenomen" — "De Dagregisters van het Kasteel Zeelandia", pp.6–8

=== Linguistic evidence ===
A comparison of numerals of Siraya, Taivoan (Tevorangh dialect), and Makatao (Kanapo dialect) with Proto-Austronesian language show the difference among the three Austronesian languages in southwestern Taiwan in the early 20th century:

| | PAn | Siraya (UM) (Note: Based on the Siraya vocabulary found in the Utrecht Manuscript written in the 17th century.) | Siraya (Gospel) (Note: Based on the Siraya vocabulary found in the Gospel of St. Matthew written in the 17th century.) | Siraya (Kongana) (Note: Attested in Siraya's Kongana community in the early 20th century.) | Taivoan (Tevorangh) (Note: Attested among Tevorangh-Taivoan communities, including Siaolin, Alikuan, and Kahsianpoo, in the early 20th century.) | Makatao (Kanapo) (Note: Attested in Makatao's Kanapo community in the early 20th century.) |
|---|---|---|---|---|---|---|
| 1 | *asa | sa-sat | saat | sasaat | tsaha | na-saad |
| 2 | *duSa | sa-soa | ruha | duha | ruha | ra-ruha |
| 3 | *telu | tu-turo | turu | turu | tuhu | ra-ruma |
| 4 | *Sepat | pa-xpat | xpat | tapat | pahaʔ | ra-sipat |
| 5 | *lima | ri-rima | rima | tu-rima | hima | ra-lima |
| 6 | *enem | ni-nam | nom | tu-num | lom | ra-hurum |
| 7 | *pitu | pi-pito | pitu | pitu | kito | ra-pito |
| 8 | *walu | kuxipat | kuixpa | pipa | kipa | ra-haru |
| 9 | *Siwa | matuda | matuda | kuda | matuha | ra-siwa |
| 10 | *puluq | keteang | kitian | keteng | kaipien | ra-kaitian |

In 2009, Li (2009) further proved the relationship among the three languages, based on the latest linguistic observations below:

Major differences among the Sirayaic languages
| | Siraya | Taivoan | Makatao | PA |
|---|---|---|---|---|
| Sound change (1) | r | Ø~h | r | < *l |
| Sound change (2) | l | l | n | < *N |
| Sound change (3) | s | r, d | r, d | < *D, *d |
| Sound change (4) | -k- -g- | Ø Ø | -k- ---- | < *k < *S |
| Morphological change (suffices for future tense) | -ali | -ah | -ani | |

Based on the discovery, Li attempted two classification trees:

1. Tree based on the number of phonological innovations

- Sirayaic
  - Taivoan
  - Siraya–Makatao
    - Siraya
    - Makatao

2. Tree based on the relative chronology of sound changes

- Sirayaic
  - Siraya
  - Taivoan–Makatao
    - Taivoan
    - Makatau

Li (2009) considers the second tree (the one containing the Taivoan–Makatao group) to be the somewhat more likely one.

Lee (2015) regards that, when Siraya was a lingua franca among at least eight indigenous communities in southwestern Taiwan plain, Taivoan people from Tevorangh, who has been proved to have their own language in "De Dagregisters van het Kasteel Zeelandia", might still need the translation service from Wanli, a neighbor community that shared common hunting field and also a militarily alliance with Tevorangh.

== Sources ==
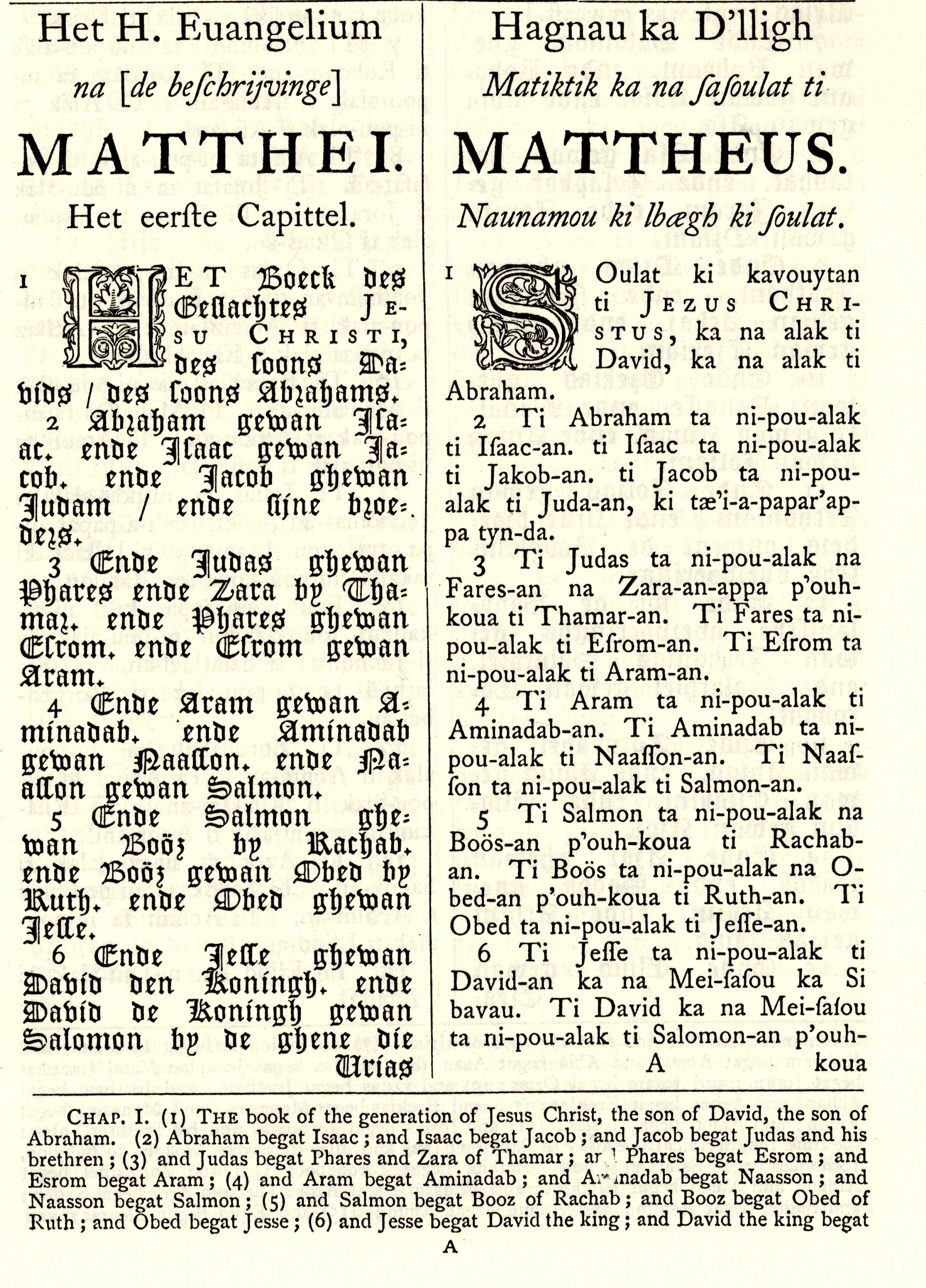
Gospel of St. Matthew in Dutch, Sinckan, and English. Original Dutch and Sinckan above is from 1661 by Daniel Gravius; English in small type was added in 1888 by Scottish missionary William Campbell.

The Siraya language entered the historical record in the early 17th century when traders from the Dutch East India Company, expelled from mainland China and Chinese waters, set up a stronghold on Taiwan at Fort Zeelandia, which was in the Siraya-speaking area. During the period of Dutch rule in Taiwan, Calvinist missionaries used Siraya and Babuza (also known as Favorlang) as contact languages. A translation of the Gospel of St. Matthew into Siraya (174 pages of Siraya and Dutch text, published by Daniel Gravius in 1661) and a catechism in Siraya (288 pages of Siraya and Dutch text, published in 1662) were published, and have been subsequently republished.

The Dutch colony was driven out in 1661 by Ming loyalist refugees from China, and Taiwan was subsequently incorporated into the Qing Empire. During the period of Qing Dynasty rule, use of Siraya receded, but some Siraya language materials survive in the form of Siraya land contracts with Chinese translations, known as the Sinckan Manuscripts. The last records were lists of words made in the early 19th century.

The Tainan Pe-po Siraya Culture Association published a modern-day Siraya glossary in 2008, authored by Edgar Macapili.

A paper published in 2021 reports on a translation of the Gospel of St. John into Siraya by Gravius in 1661. The discovery of this second Siraya text in the Royal Danish Library has greatly enriched modern scholarly understanding of this language.

== Phonology ==
The phonological system of Siraya is speculated by Adelaar (1997) to have the following phonemes.

Consonants (18–20 total)

b d nḡ (Note: The exact phonemic value of "nḡ," as it appears in Siraya language documents, is unknown.)
p t k
m n ng
l, r
v z
c
[f] s x h
w y

Vowels (7 total)

- a, ä, i (ĭ), e, ə, u (ŭ), o

Diphthongs (6 total)

- ay, ey, uy, äw, aw, ow

Palatalization also occurs in many words.

== Grammar ==
Siraya auxiliaries constitute an open class and are placed at the head of the verb phrase (Adelaar 1997).

=== Pronouns ===
The Siraya personal pronouns below are from Adelaar (1997).

Siraya Personal Pronouns
| | | | Free | Actor or Possessive | Topic | Oblique |
|---|---|---|---|---|---|---|
| 1st person | singular | | ĭau | -(m)au | -koh | ĭau-an |
| 1st person | plural | excl. | ĭmi-an | -(m)ian, -(m)iän | -kame | mian-än (mian-an) |
| 1st person | plural | incl. | ĭmĭtta | -(m)ĭtta, -(m)eta | -kĭtta | ĭmittä-n |
| 2nd person | singular | | ĭmhu | -(m)uhu, -(m)oho | -kow | ĭmhu-an |
| 2nd person | plural | | ĭmumi | -(m)umi | (-)kamu | ĭmumi-än (ĭmumi-an) |
| 3rd person | singular | | teni | tĭn | teni | tĭni-än (tĭni-an) |
| 3rd person | plural | | ta neini | nein | neini | neini-än (neini-an) |

=== Function words ===
The list of function words below is sourced from Adelaar (1997).

Demonstratives

- atta, k(a)-atta 'this, these'
- anna, k(a)-anna 'that, those'

Interrogatives

- mang 'what?'
- ti mang 'who?'
- tu mang 'where'
- mama mang, mama ki mang, mameymang 'how?'
- kaumang 'why?'

Negation markers

- assi (also "aoussi") 'no(t)'
- ĭnnaʼ don't'
- nĭnno 'nothing'
- mi-kakua.. . assi ("myhkaqua ... assi") 'never'
- ĭnnang ("ynnang") 'refuse to, not want to; don't'

Other words

- ti – personal article
- ta – topic marker
- tu – locative marker
- ki – default relation marker
- tu ämäx ki – "before"
- tu lam ki – "together with"
- ka – coordinating conjunction (links verbal clauses)

=== Verbs ===
The following list of Siraya verb affixes is from Adelaar (1997).

Affixes

- ni-: past tense
- ma-, m-, -m-: actor focus / orientation
- pa-: undergoer focus / orientation
- mey- ~ pey-: actor- and undergoer-oriented verbs (used with verbs describing a high degree of physical involvement)
- mu- ~ (p)u-: actor- and undergoer-oriented verbs (used with verbs describing a movement toward something)
- ma-: stative intransitive verbs; words with no apparent word-class affiliations (precategorials)
- paka-: causative
- pa-: transitive (often with causative result)
- ka-: expresses feeling, emotion, sensation (undergoer-oriented verbs and deverbal nouns only)
- -ən, -an: undergoer focus / orientation
- -a, -ey, -aw: irrealis
- -(l)ato: possibly a perfective marker

See also Proto-Austronesian language for a list of Proto-Austronesian verbal affixes.

Classifiers

Like Bunun and many other Formosan languages, Siraya has a rich set of verbal classifier prefixes.

- mattäy- / pattäy-: "talking, saying"
- smaki-: "throwing, casting"
- sau-: "swearing, making an oath"
- mu-, pu-: movement into a certain direction
- mey- / pey-: high degree of physical involvement
- sa-: movement through a narrow place
- taw-: downward movement, a movement within a confined space

== Numerals ==
Siraya has a base ten numeral system with the following forms:

Siraya Numerals
| | Cardinal | Ordinal |
|---|---|---|
| 1 | saat, sa-saat | nawnamu |
| 2 | ruha, ru-ruha | ka-ra-ruha |
| 3 | turu, tu-turu | ka-ta-turu |
| 4 | xpat, pa-xpat | ka-axpat |
| 5 | rima, ri-rima | ka-ri-rima |
| 6 | nom, nə-nəm | ka-annəm |
| 7 | pĭttu, pĭ-pĭttu | ka-pa-pĭttu |
| 8 | kuixpa | ka-kuixpa |
| 9 | matuda | ka-matuda, ka-ma-matuda |
| 10 | saat kĭttiän | ka-sasaat kĭttiän |
| | Examples of higher numerals | |
| 12 | saat kĭttiän äb ki ruha | |
| 14 | saat kĭttiän äb ki pat | |
| 30 | turu kĭttiän | |
| 60 | nənnəm kĭttiän | |
| 99 | matuda kĭttiän äb ki matuda | |
| 100 | saat ka-ätux-an | |
| 4,000 | xpat ka-tunnun-an | |
| 5,000 | lima ka-tunnun-an | |

== Examples ==
The Lord's Prayer

Raman-jan ka ito-tounnoun kow ki vullu-vullum;
Pakou-titik-auh ta nanang-oho,
Pa-irou-au ta pei-sasou-an- oho,
Paamt-au ta kamoei-en-hou, mama tou tounnoun ki vullum, kʼma-hynna tou Naei
Phʼei -kame waeʼi kʼatta ki paoul-ian ka mamsing.
Atta-ral-a ki kaeu-itting-en-hou ymiaen-an, mama ka attaral-kame ta ymiaen ki kaeu-itting-ʼniaen
Ka inei-kame dmyllough tou repung-an, ra haoumi-ei-kame ki littou.
Ka aʼmouhou ta pei-sasou-an, ta pei-lpoug-han, ta keirang-en ki kidi tou yhkaquan myd-darynnough,
Amen

== See also ==
- Daniel Gravius – Siraya language scholar
- Sinckan Manuscripts
- Taivoan language
