= Makatao people =

Indigenous people of Taiwan

Makatao, Tao
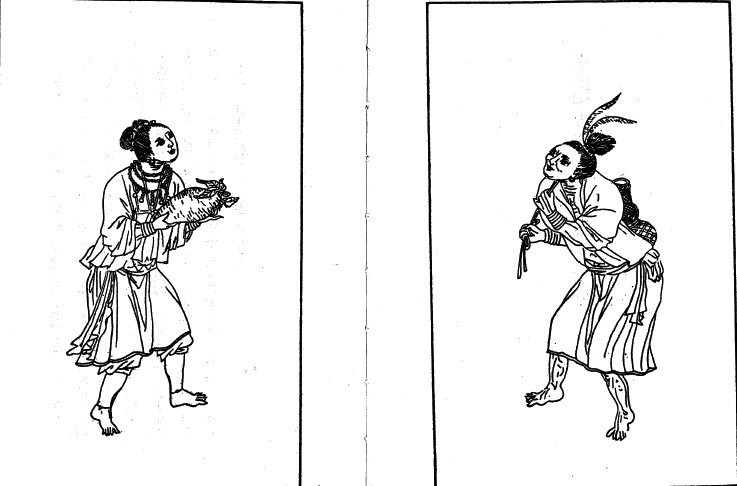
- Makatao man and woman in Chinese painting.

Total population
- More than 20,000

Regions with significant populations
- Pingtung, Taitung in Taiwan

Languages
- Makatao, Paiwan (historical and native); Mandarin, Taiwanese (dominant)

Religion
- Animism, Taoism, Buddhism, Christianity

Related ethnic groups
- Siraya, Taivoan and other Taiwanese Aborigines

The Makatao people (Makatao: Makatau; Paiwan: Ljacalisian), also written Makatau or Makattau, are an indigenous people native to Taiwan. The Makatao originally settled around lowland Kaohsiung in Southern Taiwan, later largely migrating to Pingtung and even further to Taitung in the early 19th century due to the influx of Chinese immigrants.

The indigenous people allegedly historically called themselves Tau or Makatao according to Japanese anthropologist, Inō Kanori, around the early 20th century, but other researchers considered them to be part of the Siraya or their language as part of Sirayaic from Tainan to Kaohsiung to Pingtung County. Presently, the Makatao people living across the lowland plains of Pingtung County do not know or no longer know anymore the original meaning of this name, "Makatao", and no one recalls any ancestor calling themselves "Makatao", but nevertheless this formal respectful collective name for the community is accepted within the community, but normally, Makatao villagers of the Pingtung plain refer to themselves in Taiwanese Hokkien Chinese: 山脚人; Pe̍h-ōe-jī: soaⁿ-kha-lâng; lit. 'people living at the foot of the mountain' or in Taiwanese Mandarin Chinese: 平埔族; pinyin: Píngpǔzú; lit. 'plains tribe'.

In November 2024, a representative of the Makatao people submitted a formal request to the Council of Indigenous Peoples for official recognition.

== See also ==
- Jiaruipu Temple, also called Kanapo Temple
- Makatao language
- Taiwanese Indigenous Peoples
- Plains indigenous peoples
