= Daniel Gravius =

Dutch missionary (1616–1681)

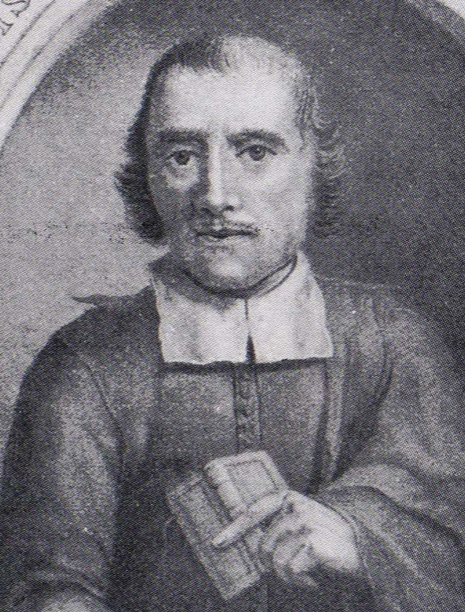
- Born: 1616; Dordrecht, Dutch Republic
- Died: 1681 (aged 64–65); Middelburg, Dutch Republic
- Other names: Daniel van de Graaff; Daniel van de Graef; Daniel Grauw
- Years active: 1647–1651
- Employer: The Dutch East India Company
- Spouses: Maria Poots; Maria Hubregtsz

Daniel Gravius (1616–1681) was a Dutch missionary to Formosa. He was a gifted linguist, who translated portions of the Bible and other Christian texts into the Siraya language. After falling out with Governor of Formosa Nicolas Verburg, he was accused of libel and censured. Later he was completely exonerated and returned to his native Netherlands with his reputation intact.

== Mission to Formosa ==
Gravius is first mentioned in historical records as a preacher in Aardenburg. After two years in Batavia undergoing training and waiting to be assigned a missionary post (where he married his first wife Maria Poots), Gravius went to Formosa in 1647 and was stationed in the village of Soulang. He was credited with introducing the concept of raising draft livestock for ploughing to the aborigines. Gravius translated Christian works into the Siraya language, including a formulary, portions of the Bible and various other tracts, which he accompanied with examples to render the meaning clear to the native Formosans. His linguistic work has been used by later scholars to shed light onto the cultural practices of the Siraya; for example, he noted that the Siraya had no words for gambling, servants or slavery. The Siraya language almost disappeared, but is reconstructed with the works of Gravius and reintroduced among the thirty thousand remaining Siraya.

In the village where Gravius was stationed, he was not only responsible for the religious life of the village, but he was also the senior judicial officer in residence. This dual role was a source of many complaints from the clergy, but the Council of Formosa (Dutch Formosa's ruling body) had ignored these complaints. In 1651 Gravius wrote to Governor Nicolas Verburg complaining about his judicial superior, super-factor Dirck Snoucq, and alleging him to be "a person of shameful and odious character." Unfortunately for Gravius, Verburg took the side of Snoucq, declaring that "this cable of infamous slander had been formed of many strands of abuses and misdeeds of so scandalous and unchristian a nature that they cannot even here be mentioned in detail."

Governor Verburg then circumvented the normal procedure for trying a libel case by declining to have it heard by the Council of Formosa, based on the supposition that Frederick Coyett, a member of that council, would rule in favor of Gravius. He fined Gravius 1,000 guilders (a considerable sum) and then "launched a vitriolic campaign against [Gravius] and against clerical power generally." The authorities in the colony descended into squabbling factions and a commissioner was sent from Batavia to sort out the mess. This commissioner, Willem Verstegen, found fault on both sides and recommended that clergymen be removed from judicial duties to avoid further conflict. Gravius went to Batavia in 1651 to appeal to Governor-General of the Dutch East Indies Carel Reyniersz and his follower Joan Maetsuycker against the verdict handed down by Verburg. (In the same year the Council of the Indies were also dealing with Cornelis van der Lijn and François Caron, who were sent back to Holland, being accused of unfair trade.)

Gravius remained in Batavia for three years, arguing his case, until he was found blameless and the money taken from him in fines was returned. He returned to the Netherlands as a preacher, where he married again in Veere and eventually died in 1681 in Middelburg.

== Published works ==
- Het heylige Euangelium Matthei en Johannis. Ofte Hagnau ka d'llig matiktik ka na sasoulat ti Mattheus ti Johannes appa [The Gospel of St. Matthew in Formosan Sinkang Dialect and Dutch]. (in Austronesian and Dutch). Amsterdam: Michiel Hartogh. 1661. OCLC 69326189.
  - Campbell, William; Gravius, Daniel (1888). The Gospel of St. Matthew in Formosan (Sinkang dialect) with corresponding versions in Dutch and English. (in Austronesian, Dutch, and English). London: Trubner. OCLC 844610148.
- Patar ki tna-'msing-an ki Christang ofte. 't Formulier des Christendoms [Formulary of Christianity in the Siraya language of Formosa]. Amsterdam: Michiel Hartogh. 1661. OCLC 846467128.

== See also ==
- Jacobus Vertrecht (Jacobus Vertrecht)
- Latinisierung von Personennamen
