= Sirayaic languages =

One of the sub-branches of the Formosan languages

Sirayaic
- Geographic distribution: Southern Taiwan
- Linguistic classification: Austronesian: East Formosan; Sirayaic
- Subdivisions: Siraya; Taivoan–Makatao

Language codes
- Glottolog: sira1267
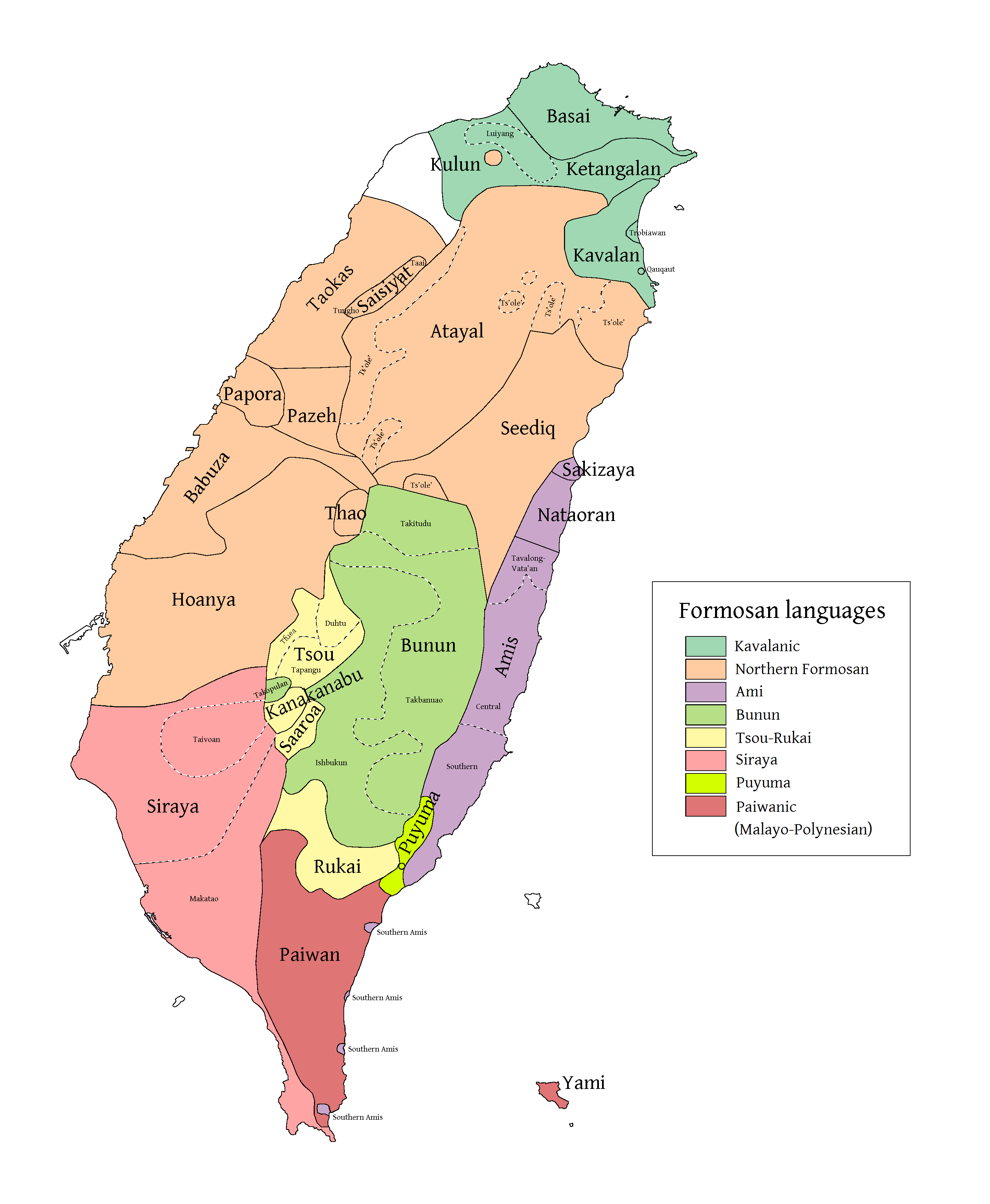
- (pink) Sirayaic

The Sirayaic languages are one of the sub-branches of the Formosan branch, under the Austronesian languages family. Both Blust (1999) and Li (2010) considers Proto-Siraya belongs to East Formosan languages, along with Kavalanic and Amis languages.

The Proto-Siraya language is the reconstructed ancestor of the Sirayaic branch. Proto-Siraya includes at least three languages: Siraya, Taivoan, and Makatao. Li claimed Proto-Siraya might have split from the other East Formosan languages around 3,500 years ago, and began to develop into modern Siraya, Taivoan, and Makatao 3,000 years ago.

== Classification ==
Raleigh Farrell (1971) believes there were at least five indigenous peoples in the southwestern plain of Taiwan at that time:

- Sirayaic
  - Siraya
  - Tevorang-Taivuan
  - Takaraian (now classified as Makatao)
  - Pangsoia-Dolatok (now classified as Makatao)
  - Longkiau (now classified as Makatao)

Based on the latest corpora, Li (2010) attempted two classification trees for Sirayaic languages:

Tree based on the number of phonological innovations	Tree based on the relative chronology of sound changes
Sirayaic; Taivoan; Siraya–Makatao; Siraya; Makatao	Sirayaic; Siraya; Taivoan–Makatao; Taivoan; Makatao

== Reconstruction ==
Adelaar published his reconstruction of Proto-Siraya phonology in 2014:

Proto-Siraya Consonants (Adelaar, 2014)
	Labial	Alveolar	Palatal	Velar	Glottal
Unvoiced stop	p	t		k	
Voiced stop	b	d			
Nasal	m	n		ŋ	
Unvoiced spirants		s			h
Voiced spirants	v	ð		ɣ	
Lateral		r, ł			
Semivowels	w		y		

Proto-Siraya Vowels (Adelaar, 2014)
Height	Front	Central	Back
Close	i		u
Mid		ə	
Open		a	

=== Sound changes ===
Based on the comparison of the available corpora, Adelaar (2014) proposed a summary of sound correspondences between Proto-Austronesian and Proto-Siraya, comapared with Siraya or Taivoan in the 17th century, accompanied with the other three East Formosan languages, Basay, Kavalan, and Amis, proposed by Li (2004):

Proto-Austronesian	Proto-Siraya	Siraya (UM)	Siraya or Taivoan (Gospel)	Basay	Kavalan	Amis
*p	*p	p	p	p	p	p
*t, *C	*t	t	t	t	t	t
*c	--					
*k	*k	k	k	k, h /_a	k, q	k
*q	Ø			Ø	Ø	Q
*b	*b	b/v	b/v	b	b	f
*d	*ð	s/d, -s-, -s	d/r, -r-, -r/d			
*-D	--			r, l	z	d
*z	*d	d	d	r, l	z	d
*j	*n	n	n	n	n	n
*g	--					
*m	*m	m	m	m	m	m
*n	*n	n	n	n	n	n
*ñ	?*n	n	n	n	n	d
*ŋ	*ŋ	ŋ	ŋ	ŋ	ŋ	ŋ
*h	Ø			Ø	Ø	h, ?
*S	*s	Ø, -s-	Ø, -h-	s	s	s
*s	*s	s/h-, -s/h/x-, -x	s/h-, -s/h/x-, -Ø	c	s	c
*R	*x	x	h/Ø-, -h/Ø-, -x	r, l	r, l, R	l
*l	*r	r	r	c	r, l, R	l
*r	--					
*N	*ł	l	l	n	n	d
*w	*w, *u	w	w	w	w	v
*y	*y	y	y	y	y	y
*a	*a	a	a	a	a, i / *q	a
*ə	*ə	Ø	Ø			
*i	*i	i, -i/e	i, -i/e	i	i	i
*u	*u	u	u/aw-, -u-, -u/aw	u	u	u

=== Comparison chart ===
Below is a chart comparing list of numbers of 1–10 in Sirayaic languages, including different dialects of Siraya, Taivoan, and Makatao language, spoken from Tainan to Pingtung in southwestern Taiwan, and from Hualien to Taitung in eastern Taiwan:

Austronesian List of Numbers 1-10		Dialects	Autonym	1	2	3	4	5	6	7	8	9	10
Proto-Austronesian				*əsa *isa	*duSa	*təlu	*Səpat	*lima	*ənəm	*pitu	*walu	*Siwa	*(sa-)puluq
Proto-Siraya				*saat	*ðusa	*turu	*səpat	*rǐma	*nəm	*pitu	*kuixpa	*ma-tuda	*saat ki tian
17th century	Siraya	Utrecht (Note: Attested in the Utrecht Manuscripts written in the 17th century.)	--	saat	sa-soa	tu-turo	pa-xpat	ri-rima	ni-nam	pi-pito	kuxipat	matuda	keteang
17th century	Siraya (arguably)	Gospel (Note: Attested in the Gospel of St. Matthew in the 17th century, which Li (2010) regards as Taivoan language along with Moatao dialect, rather than Siraya.)	--	saat	ruha	turu	xpat	rima	nom	pitu	kuixpa	matuda	kitian
20th century	Siraya	Kongana (Note: Attested and recorded in Kongana (崗仔林), a Siraya community in nowadays Zuojhen, Tainan.)	Siraiya	sasaat	duha	turu	tapat	tu-rima	tu-num	pitu	pipa	kuda	keteng
20th century	Siraya (arguably)	Moatao (Note: Investigated and recorded by Ino. Kanori in Moatao (麻豆), a Siraya community located in nowadays Madou, Tainan.)	Siraiya	isa	rusa	tao	usipat	hima	lomu	pitu	vao	siva	masu
20th century	Taivoan	Suannsamna (Note: Investigated by Ino, Kanori in Suannsamna (山杉林), a Sia-urie-Taivoan community located in nowadays Shanlin, Kaohsiung.)	--	sa'a	zua	to'o	sipat gaspa	urima	urumu	upitu	uwaru	hsiya	--
20th century	Taivoan	Siaolin (Note: Including vocabulary attested in Siaolin (小林) and Alikuan (阿里關), as the Taivoan people emigrated from Alikuan to Siaolin only in the late 19th century and have had very close relationship with each other. Both of the communities belong to Tevorangh-Taivoan.)	Taibowan	tsaha saka	ruha luha	tohu	paha' limta	hima	lom lanlan	kito	kipa	matuha matsuha	kaipien kaitian
20th century	Taivoan	Dazhuang (Note: Attested in Dazhuang (大庄), a community in Hualien, founded by mainly Taivoan people immigrated from Siaolin and Laulong, and also by some Makatao people and very few Siraya people in the 19th century.)	Taivoan Taiburan	tsatsa'a	raruha	tato'o	tapat	tarima	tanum	tyausen	rapako	ravasen	kaiten
20th century	Makatao	Laopi (Note: Investigated in Marun or Laopi (老埤) in the early 20th century, a Makatao community located in nowadays Neipu, Pingtung.)	Makatao	saka	bailung	kutung	lumta	rima	langalan	kimseng	kalasin	kabaitya	kaiten
20th century	Makatao	Kanapo (Note: Investigated and recorded in Kanapo (加蚋埔) in the early 20th century, a Makatao community located in nowadays Gaoshu, Pingtung.)	--	na-saad	ra-ruha	ra-ruma	ra-sipat	ra-lima	ra-hurum	ra-pito	ra-haru	ra-siwa	ra-kaitian
20th century	Makatao	Bankim (Note: Investigated in Bankim (萬金), a Makatao community located in nowadays Wanluan, Pingtung, in the late 19th century by Steere.)	--	saat	laluha	taturu	hapat	lalima	anum	papitu	--	tuda	saatitin
