= George Candidius =

Georgius Candidius (1597 – 30 April 1647) was a Dutch Reformed Church missionary to Dutch Formosa from 1627 to 1637. He was the first missionary to be stationed on the island.

== Name ==
Candidius's Latinate first name is sometimes Germanified to Georg or Anglicized to George. He sinified it as 干治士, whose modern pinyin romanization is Gān Zhìshì.

== Biography ==
Candidius was born in 1597 at Kirchardt in the Palatinate. He studied at Leiden in the Dutch Republic from 1621 to 1623, when he was persuaded by Sebastiaen Dankaerts to minister overseas. Before arriving in Formosa in 1627 Candidius worked in Ternate, Moluccas. Having arrived in Taiwan he refused to live in the Dutch castle Zeelandia and settled in the native village of Sinckan (modern-day Sinshih) instead.

In 1632 he married Saartje Specx, daughter of Governor-General Jacques Specx. Specx had previously evoked a scandal in Batavia and Holland when she was discovered having sex with a young soldier in the private quarters of Specx's predecessor, Jan Pieterszoon Coen, who was known for his harsh discipline. Narrowly escaping a death sentence, she was flogged and her lover beheaded.

After a year in residence in the region of Tayouan (present-day Tainan), Candidius commented regarding his missionary duties that:

"I have used great diligence to learn their language, and from the outset to instruct them in the Christian faith; and I have succeeded so far that a fortnight before Christmas of the year 1628 there were a hundred and twenty-eight persons who knew the prayers and were able to answer in the most satisfactory manner with regard to the principal articles of our Christian faith; but for certain reasons none of these have been baptized."

Candidius returned to the Netherlands in 1639 and went to Batavia (Jakarta) in the Dutch East Indies (Indonesia) in 1643. There, he served as rector of the Latin school until his death on 30 April 1647.

Sun-Moon Lake in central Taiwan was named Lake Candidius in his honour and is referred to thus in older English writings, although this name was not adopted by the local inhabitants and later fell into disuse.

== Published works ==
- Georgius Candidus. Discours ende Cort verhaal, van't Eylant Formosa, ondersocht ende beschreven, door den Eerwaardingen (A Short Account of the Island of Formosa in the Indies) (in Dutch).
- Candidius, Georgius, Ides, Evert Ysbrandszoon, Roe, Thomas. An Entertaining account of all the countries of the known world : describing the different religions, habits, tempers, customs, traffick, and manufactures, of their inhabitants.
