= William Campbell (missionary) =

The Reverend William Campbell
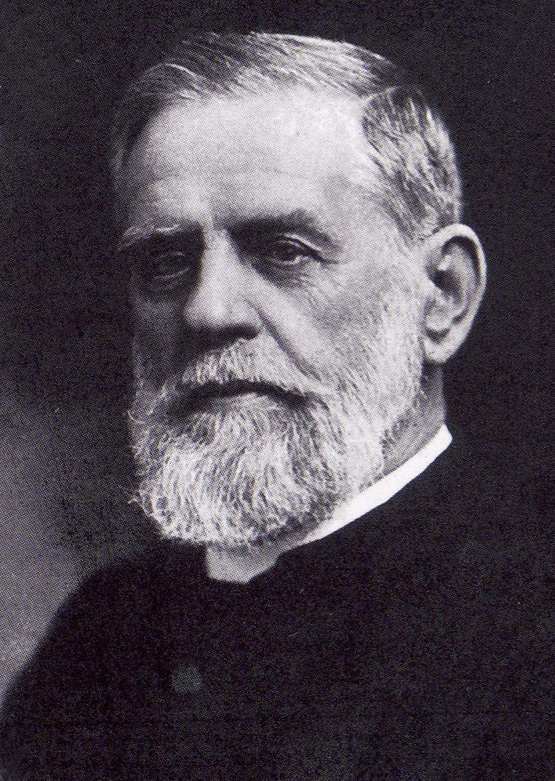
- An engraving of Campbell as depicted in his book Sketches from Formosa
- Born: 1841; Glasgow, Scotland
- Died: 9 September 1921 (aged 79–80); Bournemouth, Dorset (buried in Wimborne Road Cemetery, Bournemouth)
- Education: Free Church College, Glasgow University of Glasgow
- Title: LL.D.

Signature
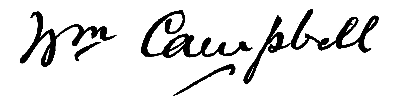

William Campbell (Chinese: 甘為霖; Pe̍h-ōe-jī: Kam Ûi-lîm) (1841–1921) was a Scottish Presbyterian missionary to Formosa (Qing Taiwan). He wrote extensively on topics related to Taiwan and was also responsible for founding the island's first school for the blind. Interested in the early history of the island (particularly the Dutch era), his knowledge of the time was such that he was called "without doubt the greatest authority on this subject living". He was probably the first European to see Sun-Moon Lake, which he named Lake Candidius in honour of the seventeenth century Dutch missionary George Candidius.

== Mission to Taiwan ==
Campbell arrived in Qing-era Taiwan in 1871 to begin his mission in southern Taiwan, being stationed in Taiwan-fu, the capital of Taiwan Prefecture (modern-day Tainan) and serving both Han Chinese and Taiwanese aborigines in the area. He was a contemporary of Thomas Barclay, James Laidlaw Maxwell and George Leslie Mackay, who were all engaged in missionary work in Taiwan.

A strong supporter of "native ministers" (i.e. Han and aborigine clergy), Campbell wrote concerning one particular incident that

...our worthy Chinese colleague received a most hearty welcome from the brethren. He seemed to have great power in speaking to them at our forenoon service. [...] Whilst listening to him, one could not but feel the importance of having an educated native ministry in every part of China. Men like Pastor Iap are able to adapt themselves in a way the missionary can never do, and to overcome difficulties which must always hamper any mere sojourner in the country.

Campbell witnessed Taiwan's transition to Japanese rule. His mission lasted for forty-six years, until he left Taiwan for the last time in 1917 to return to his native Scotland, where he died in 1921.

== Published works ==
- Campbell, W.; Gravius, Daniel (1888). The Gospel of St. Matthew in Formosan (Sinkang Dialect) with corresponding versions in Dutch and English. London: Trübner. LCCN 2006478012. OCLC 54336915.
- —————; Sibelius, Caspar (1889). An Account of Missionary Success in Island of Formosa. London: Trübner. OCLC 8390478. OL 25396942M.
- ————— (1896). Past and Future of Formosa: With a New Map of the Island. Hong Kong: Kelly and Walsh. LCCN 05007841. OCLC 64871726: reprinted from Campbell, W. (August 1896). "The island of Formosa: Its past and future". Scottish Geographical Magazine. 12 (8): 385–399. doi:10.1080/00369229608732903.
- Psalmanazar, George; Vertrecht, Jacobus; Happart, Gilbert (1896). Campbell, W. (ed.). The articles of Christian instruction in Favorlang-Formosan, Dutch and English, from Vertrecht's manuscript of 1650, with Psalmanazar's dialogue between a Japanese and a Formosan, and Happart's Favorlang vocabulary. London: K. Paul, Trench, Trübner & co. OCLC 4658625. OL 13995018M.
- ————— (1902). Notes on a visit to the Taichu prefecture of Formosa. Helensburgh: J. Lamont. OCLC 558224246.
- ————— (1903). Formosa under the Dutch: Described from Contemporary Records. London: Kegan Paul. ISBN 9789576380839. LCCN 04007338. OCLC 2532095.
- ————— (1906). Memorandum on Printing Missionary Books in the So-called South Formosa Dialect. Tainan. OCLC 40859076.
- ————— (1910). Handbook of the English Presbyterian mission in south Formosa. Hastings: F.J. Parsons. OCLC 37352945.
- ————— (1915). Sketches from Formosa. London: Marshall Brothers. OCLC 906302793. OL 7051071M.
- ————— (1913). A Dictionary of the Amoy Vernacular spoken throughout the prefectures of Chin-chiu, Chiang-chiu and Formosa (in Minnan). Tainan: Taiwan Church Press. hdl:2027/pst.000072254844. OCLC 39684248.
  - ————— (1923) [1913]. A Dictionary of the Amoy Vernacular spoken throughout the prefectures of Chin-chiu, Chiang-chiu and Formosa (2nd ed.). Yokohama: Fukuin Print. Co. hdl:2027/mdp.39015056044533. OCLC 43655590. (with preface by Thomas Barclay)
