= Guanshan Village, Kaohsiung =

Village in Jiaxian, Kaohsiung, Taiwan

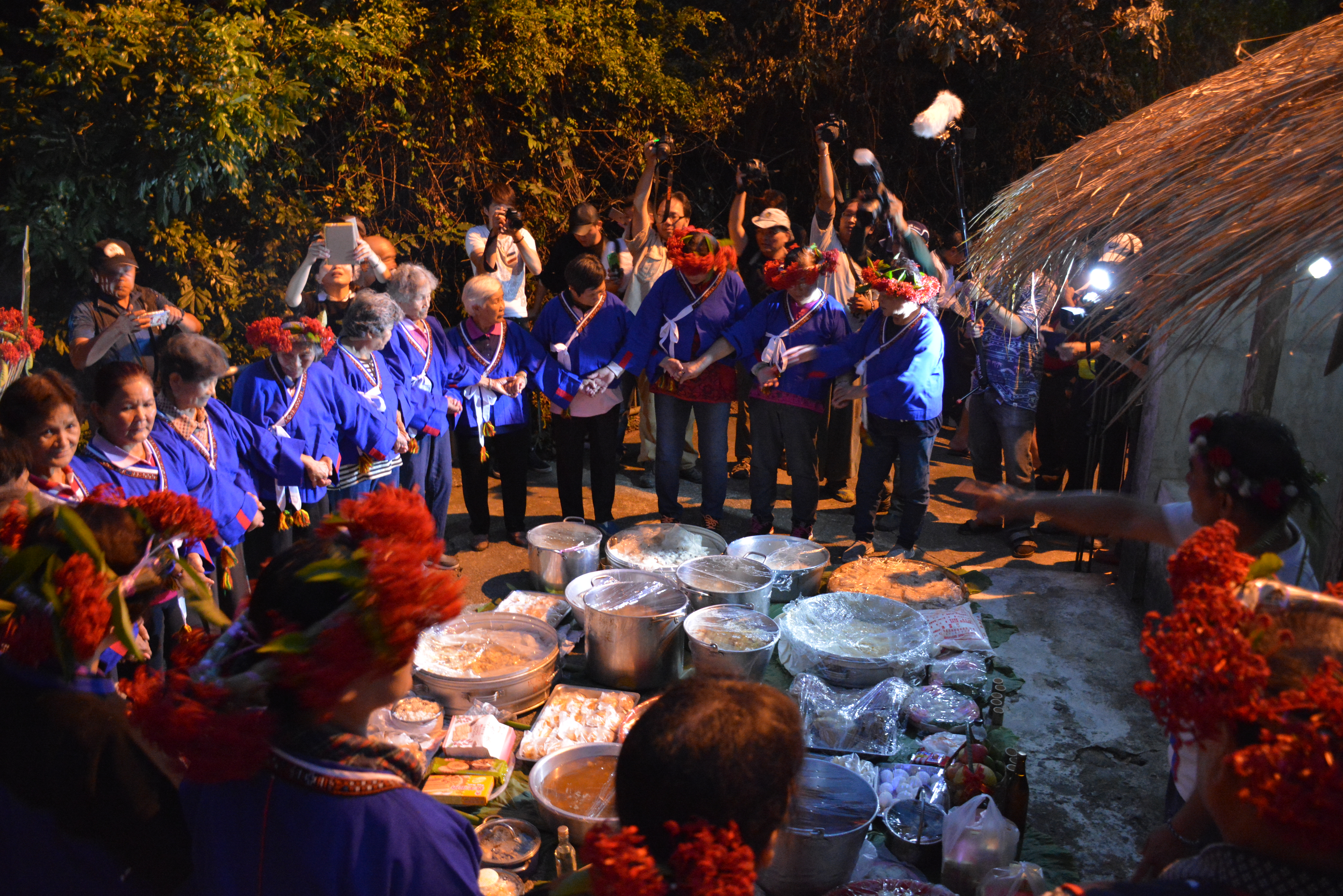
The annual Night Ceremony of Taivoan people in Alikuan.

Guanshan Village (Chinese: 關山里), also called by the locals as Alikuan (Chinese: 阿里關; Taiwanese Romanization: Ah-lí-kuan) or Aliguan, is an indigenous Taivoan community located in Jiaxian District in Kaohsiung City, Taiwan. As driven by Chinese immigrants and Siraya, Taivoan people started to emigrate from Tainan to Kaohsiung in the early 18th century, and eventually founded the community in 1744. Alikuan was also an important battle field in Tapani incident in 1915.

Taivoan people in Alikuan were forced to migrate in group to nowadays Siaolin by the Japanese government during the Japanese occupation of Taiwan, eventually founding Siaolin Village in 1905.

== See also ==
- Taivoan
