= Taivoan people =

Ethnic group indigenous to southern Taiwan

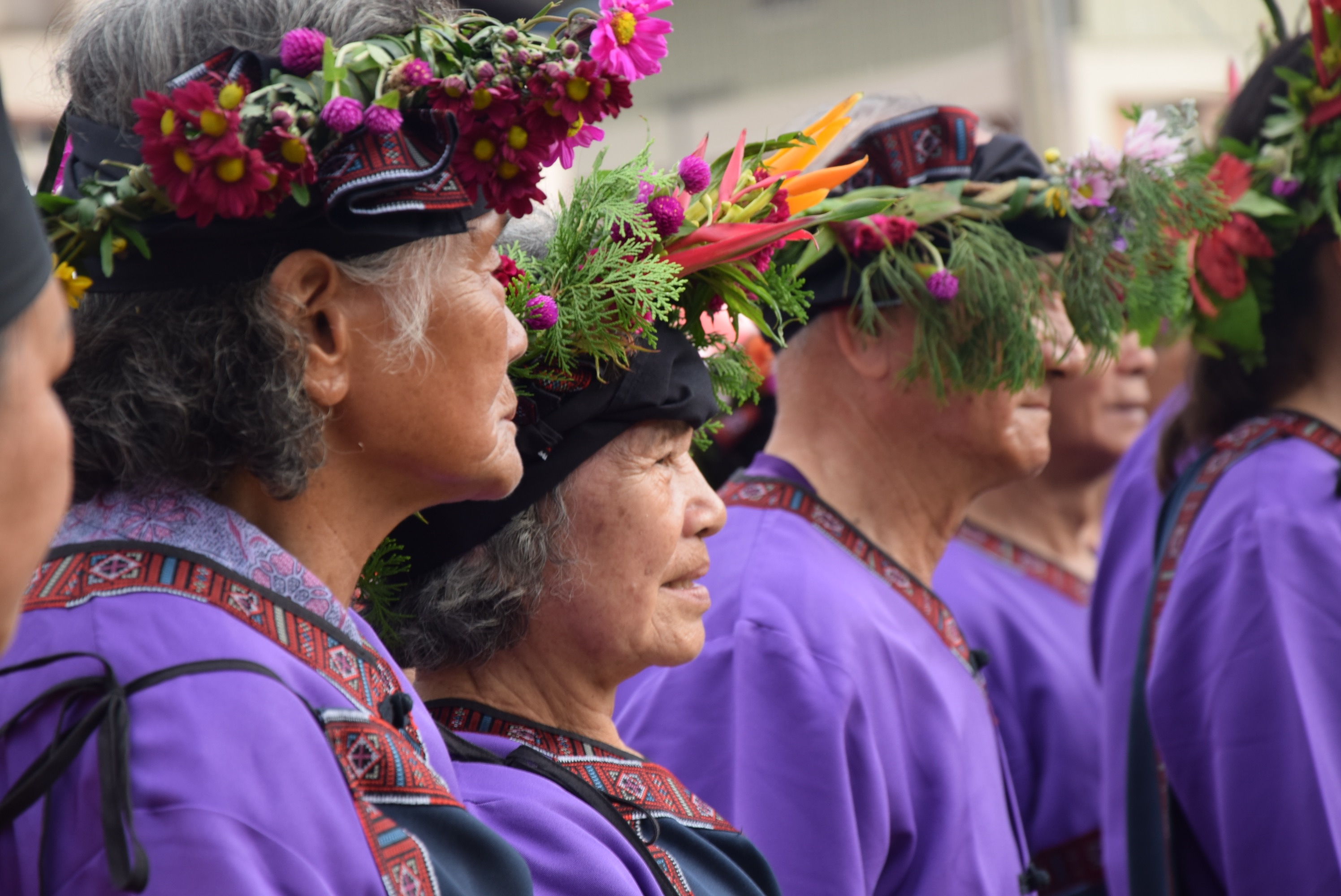
- Taivoan elders in traditional dress at the Night Ceremony in Xiaolin, Kaohsiung

Total population
- 20,000+ (est.)

Regions with significant populations
- Kaohsiung, Tainan, Taitung and Hualien

Languages
- Taivoan (historical), Taiwanese, Mandarin

Religion
- Animism, Buddhism, Christianity, Taoism

Related ethnic groups
- Other Taiwanese aborigines (Siraya, Makatao), Hoklo Taiwanese

Taivoan people
- Traditional Chinese: 大武壠族
- Simplified Chinese: 大武垅族
Transcriptions
Standard Mandarin
- Hanyu Pinyin: Dàwǔlóngzú

Alternative Chinese name
- Traditional Chinese: 大滿族
- Simplified Chinese: 大满族
Transcriptions
Standard Mandarin
- Hanyu Pinyin: Dàmǎnzú

Second alternative Chinese name
- Chinese: 四社
- Literal meaning: four tribes
Transcriptions
Standard Mandarin
- Hanyu Pinyin: Sìshè

The Taivoan (Note: ; also spelled Taivuan.) or Tevorangh (Note: ; also spelled Tevorang, Tivorang or Tivorangh.) are a Taiwanese indigenous ethnic group. The Taivoan originally settled around hill and basin areas in Tainan, especially in the Yujing Basin, which the Taivoan called Tamani, later transliterated into Japanese Tamai (玉井) and later borrowed in Chinese (Yujing). The Taivoan historically called themselves Taivoan, Taibowan, Taiburan or Shisha.

According to some scholars, there should be more than 20,000 Taivoan people nowadays, estimated based on the records during Japanese rule of Taiwan, ranked as the second largest non-status indigenous people in Taiwan, after the Makatao people.

Many scholars propose that the name of the island Taiwan actually came from the indigenous people's name, as the pronunciation of Taivoan is similar to Tayovan, the people whom the Dutch met around the coast of Anping or the bay around Anping, which later became the name Taiwan. In addition, the Taivoan established a settlement called Taiouwang, which is the only indigenous community residing there whose name resembles Taiwan.

== History ==
The Taivoan people are ethnically called "Taivoan" or "Tevorangh". While the former term comes from the self-identification of the indigenous people recorded by Japanese linguists in the early 20th century, the latter comes from one of the four main tribes or nations established by the Taivoan in the early 17th century, well-recorded by the Dutch and Chinese people in a couple of documents, in different spellings including Tevorang, Tevoran, Tefurang, Devoran, Tivorang, Tivorangh, and the like. Farrell also noted that the two terms "Tevorangh and Taivoan are probably dialectal variants of a common name (< *tayvura-n)".

In December 1628, George Candidius, the first missionary to Dutch Formosa, wrote that there were eight tribes around modern-day Tainan, including "Sinkan, Mattau, Soulang, Bakloan, Taffakan, Tifulukan, Teopan and Tefurang", among which "the most remote village is Tefurang, which lies between the mountains". In 1694, Chinese officer Kao Gong-qian (高拱亁) recorded the first Chinese record of Tevorangh in "Taiwan Prefecture Gazetteer" (臺灣府志), stating that the tribe was located to the northwest of Ma-an Mt. Both records show the tribes' location and living environment in mountainous area of Taivoan or Tevorangh, compared to the Siraya and Makatao – the two indigenous peoples with a close relationship to Taivoan – who inhabit the lowland only.

=== Mattau Incident ===
In 1629, the third governor of Dutch Formosa, Pieter Nuyts, dispatched 63 Dutch soldiers to Mattau with the excuse of "arresting Chinese pirates". The effort was impeded by the local indigenous people, as they had been resentful at the Dutch colonists who invaded and slaughtered many of their people. On the way back, the 63 Dutch soldiers were drowned by the indigenous people of Mattau, resulting in the retaliation of Pieter Nuyts and later the Mattau Incident (麻豆社事件) in 1635.

On November 23, 1635, Nuyts led 500 Dutch soldiers and 500 Siraya soldiers from Sinckan to assail Mattau, killing 26 tribal people and burning all the buildings in Mattau. On December 18, Mattau surrendered and signed the Mattau Act (麻豆條約) with the Dutch governor Hans Putmans. In this act, Mattau agreed to grant all the land inherited or controlled and all the properties owned by the people of Mattau to the Dutch. The Mattau Act has two significant meanings in the history of Taiwan:

- The Mattau Act is the first sovereignty grant act signed between Taiwanese indigenous people and a foreign sovereignty in the history.
- The sovereignty of the Formosans or the Taiwanese indigenous peoples was recognized by the Dutch government.

=== Resistance against Japanese ===
As a resistance to the long-term oppression by the Japanese government, many Taivoan people from Jiasian led the first local rebellion against Japan in July 1915, called the Jiasian Incident (甲仙埔事件). This was followed by a wider rebellion from Yuchin Basin in Tainan to Jiasian in Kaohsiung in August 1915, known as the Tapani Incident (噍吧哖事件) in which more than 1,400 local people died or were killed by the Japanese government. Twenty-two years later, the Taivoan people struggled to carry on another rebellion; since most of the indigenous people were from Xiaolin, the resistance taking place in 1937 was named the Xiaolin Incident (小林事件).

=== Classification and self-identification ===
The Taivoan people used to be classified as a subgroup of Siraya; however, Raleigh Farrell regards Taivoan as an indigenous ethnic group according to 17th century documents, and believes there were at least five indigenous peoples in the south-western plain of Taiwan at that time:

- Siraya
- Tevorang-Taivuan
- Takaraian (now classified as Makatao)
- Pangsoia-Dolatok (now classified as Makatao)
- Longkiau (now classified as Paiwan)

That Tevorang is sometimes considered to be a Siraya village is mainly based on George Candidius' inclusion "Tefurang" in the eight Siraya villages that he claimed all had "the same manners, customs and religion, and speak the same language". Ferrell mentioned that this is erroneous and that Candidious' assertion that he was well familiar with the eight supposed Siraya villages including Tevorang is extremely doubtful, as "he had not visited Tevorang when he wrote his famous account in 1628. The first Dutch visit to Tevorang appears to have been in January 1636".

Japanese anthropologist Toichi Mabuchi and many modern scholars including Shigeru Tsuchida, Li, Paul Jen-kuei, Liu, I-chang, Chien, Wen-ming, Hu, Chia-yu, Lin, Ging-cai, and Zhang, Yao-qi also regard Taivoan as an independent Taiwanese indigenous people from the aspects of linguistics and anthropology.

On October 6, 2016, Taivoan people across Kaohsiung held the first Inter-tribal Consensus Conference of Taivoan People and made a consensus statement that both "Tevorangh" (the classification recorded since the 17th century) and "Taivoan" (the classification since the 20th century) are accepted by the Taivoan people, but they refuse to be identified as "Siraya" or a subgroup of the Siraya people.

== Distribution ==
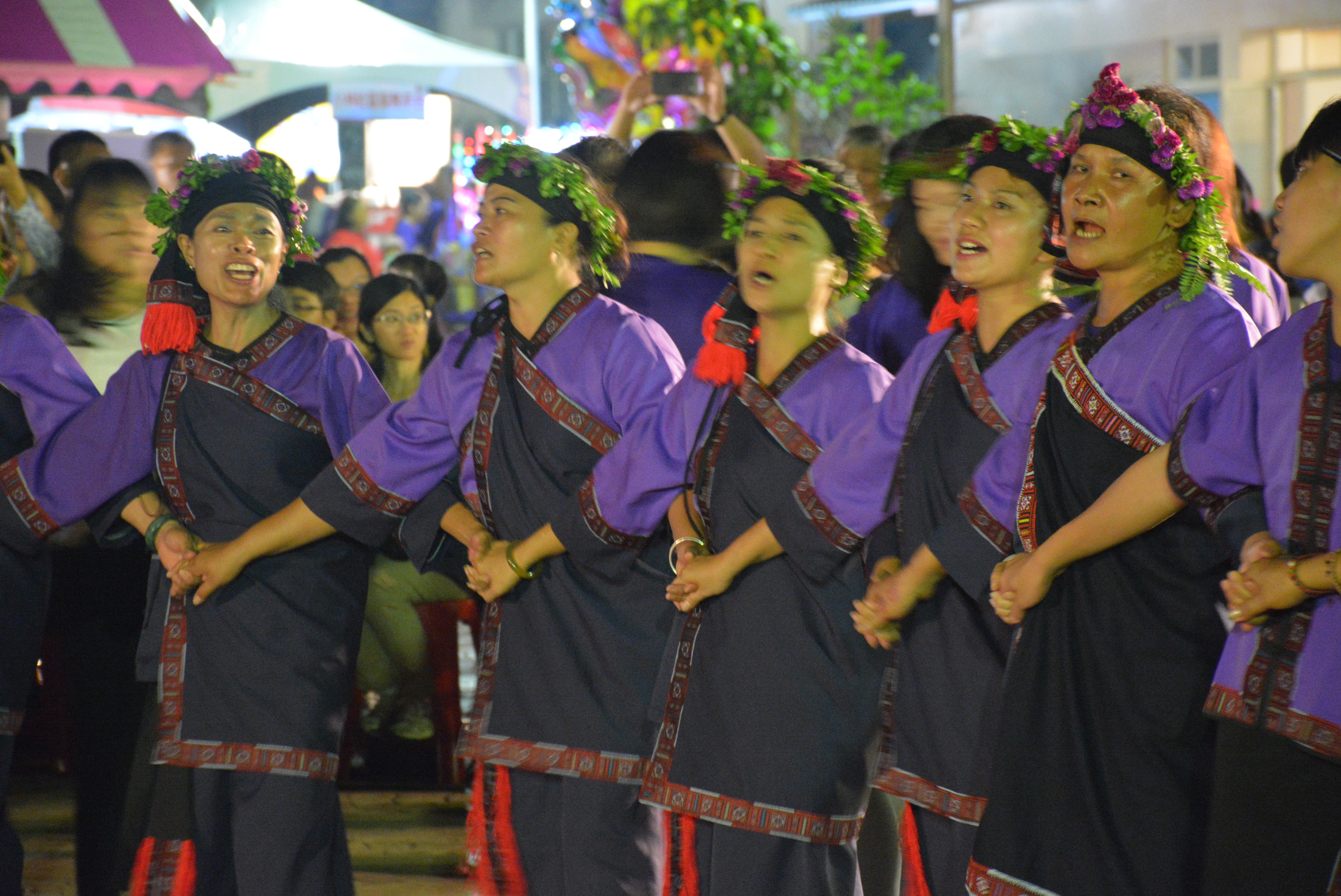
Taivoan people in traditional dress doing Unaunaw or Khan-Hì in Xiaolin in the evening of the annual Night Ceremony

According to the oral history, Taivoan people originally lived in Taivoan community in nowadays Anping, Tainan and later founded two communities Tavakangh and Teopan in Xinhua. As invaded by Siraya people, Taivoan were later forced to migrate to Zuojhen and Shanshang, establishing two communities Makang and Kogimauwang respectively. The indigenous people were later driven by Siraya again and migrated to Danei, setting up the community Nounamou (Nunamu). Siraya eventually invaded Danei and forced Taivoan to move to Yujing, where Taivoan later founded four of their most important communities, Tevorangh, Sia-urie, Vogavon, and Kapoa.

=== Historical Documents ===
According to the Dutch records in the 17th century, the Taivoan were settled in four main nations or tribes around the Yuchin Basin, and therefore they had been called Shisha (四社熟番, literally "four tribes") in the history of Taiwan.

- Tevorangh (大武壠社), also spelled as Tevorang, Tivorangh, or Tevurang. This includes:
  - Tevorangh proper
  - Taiouwang (also spelled Tajouhan or Teijnewangh)
  - Tusigit (also Sigit)
- Sia-urie (also Siyauri, Sauli, 霄里社)
- Vogavon (also Voungo Voungor, bongabong [< bo𝛈abo𝛈], 芒仔芒社)
- Kapoa (also Kapowa, 茄拔社)

Besides the four main tribes, the Taivoan had founded the following tribes or nations in their history, according to Huang Shujing (黃叔璥), a Chinese imperial emissary of Taiwan, in his “Records from the mission to Taiwan and its Strait" (臺海使槎錄) (1722):

- Tapani (噍吧哖社)
- A second tribe of Tevorangh (大武壠二社)
- Makang (木岡社)
- Maopao (茅匏社)
- Mongmingming (夢明明社)
- A sub-tribe of Tevorangh (大武壠派社), today Liuchongxi.

Citing Japanese linguist Shigeru Tsuchida, Taiwanese linguist Li, Paul Jen-kuei concluded that some areas previously considered as Siraya-speaking areas should be Taivoan-speaking areas, according to their recent research results on the Sinckan Manuscripts:

- Wanli (灣裡)
- Wankhu (灣丘)
- Kiothaotseng (橋頭莊)
- Matau (麻豆)

A small community located between Wanli and Tevorangh could be a Taivoan community, too:

- Terrijverrrijvagangh

=== Population dispersal ===
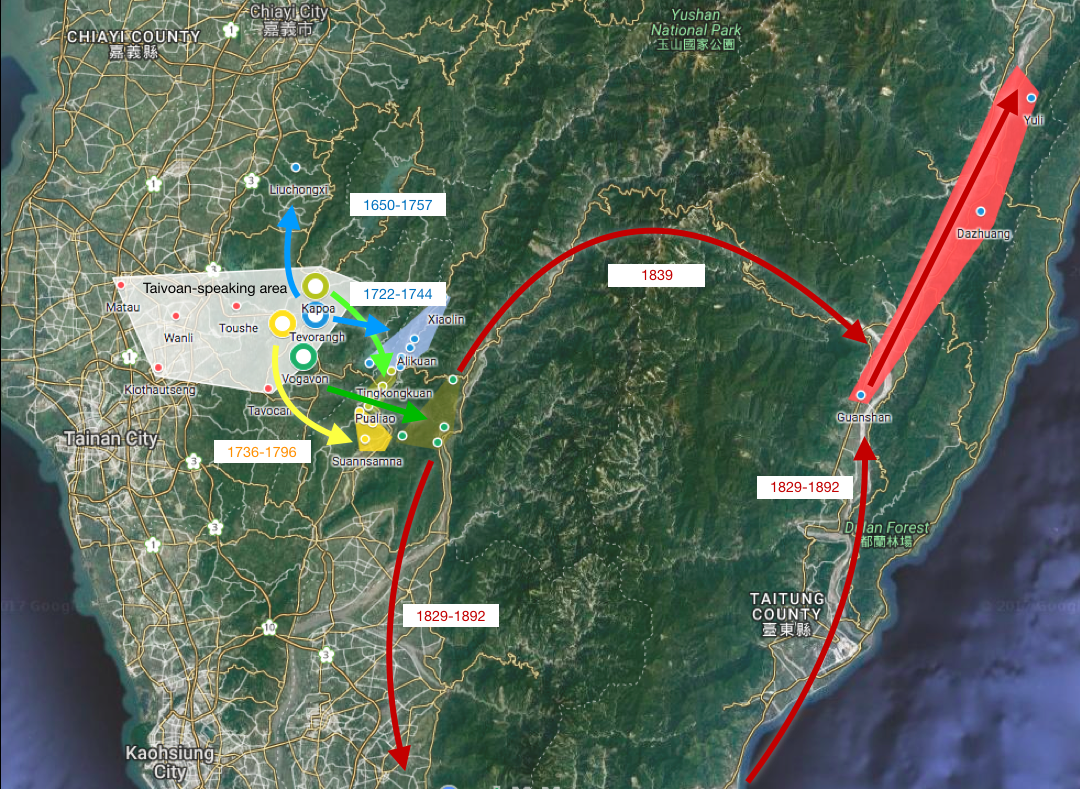
Taivoan expansion in Southern Taiwan before 20th century

After Koxinga defeated the Dutch colonists in Dutch Formosa, more Chinese immigrants flooded into Southern Taiwan, in turn driving Siraya people to inland Tainan. This resulted in the dispersal of Taivoan people from lowland to hilly areas in Tainan and Kaohsiung in the 18th century. Some Taivoan had climbed across Wu Mt. (烏山) and reached Alikuan (阿里關) between 1722 and 1744 As a result, today all the indigenous people in Yuchin Basin, the native habitat of the Taivoan, recognize themselves as ethnically "Siraya", while many Taivoan descendants still have strong Taivoan identity across new habitats founded after the 18th century, including:

==== Tainan ====
- Liuchongxi (六重溪), founded by Tevorangh-Taivoan between 1650 and 1757.
- Khetang (溪東), founded by Tevorangh-Taivoan. The local Taivoan were forced to relocate since Nanhua Dam were to be built in the 1980s.

==== Kaohsiung ====
- Alikuan (阿里關), founded by Tevorangh-Taivoan from Khetang.
- Xiaolin (小林村), founded by Tevorangh-Taivoan from Alikuan in the late 19th century.
- Pualiao (匏仔寮), mainly founded by Kapoa-Taivoan, joined by many Tevorangh-Taivoan from Xiaolin through inter-tribal marriage since the early 20th century.
- Tuakhuhenn (大丘園), founded by Kapoa-Taivoan.
- Tingkongkuan (頂公館), founded by Kapoa-Taivoan.
- Hakongkuan (下公館), founded by Kapoa-Taivoan.
- Suannsamna (山杉林), founded by Siaurie-Taivoan after 1736.
- Pangliao (枋寮), founded by Vogavon-Taivoan after 1761.
- Lakku (六龜), founded by Vogavon-Taivoan from Pangliao.
- Laulong (荖濃), founded by Vogavon-Taivoan after 1781.

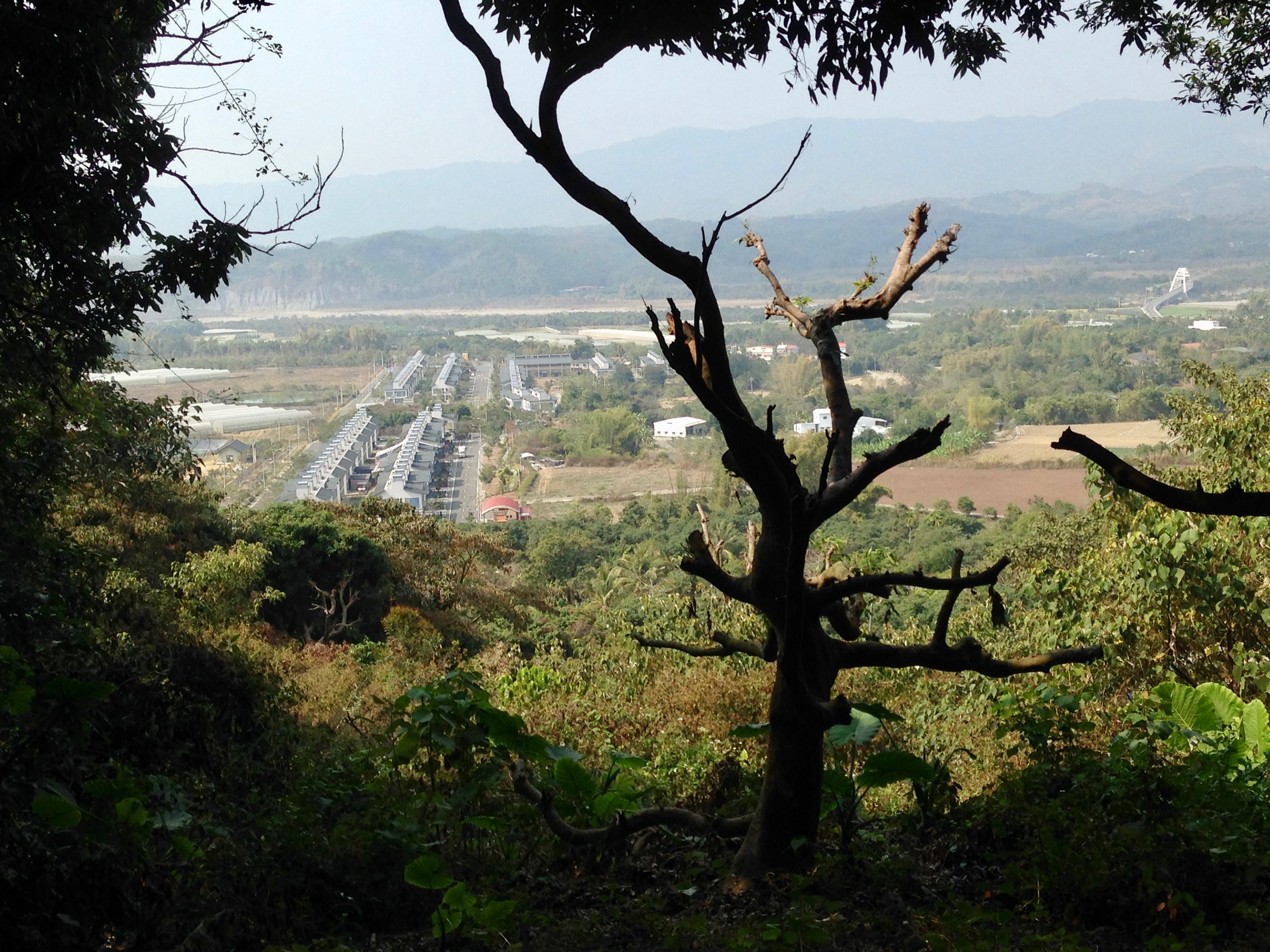
Sunlight Xiaolin, a new community of Taivoan after typhoon Morakot destroyed Xiaolin in 2009

After a fatal landslide caused by typhoon Morakot destroyed Xiaolin on August 9, 2009, the local villagers, mainly Taivoan people, were compelled to relocate to three new communities:

- Wulipu (五里埔), founded on January 15, 2011.
- Sunlight Xiaolin (日光小林), founded on December 24, 2011.
- Xiao'ai Xiaolin (小愛小林), founded on February 11, 2010.

==== Hualien ====
- Dazhuang (大庄), founded by Makatao and Taivoan people as the ethnic majority from Kaohsiung and Pingtung in the early 19th century, joined by very few Siraya people from Sinckan, Tainan, proven by the self-identification as "Taivoan", "Tau", "Makatau", or "Taiburan" by the local indigenous people in the early 20th century. Local ancestral worship marks strong Taivoan religious influence, and many locals claim they have ancestors from Xiaolin.
- Yuli (玉里)
- Guanyinshan (觀音山)
- Majialu (馬加祿)
- Wanning (萬寧)
- Luoshan (羅山)
- Mingli (明里)
- Funan (富南)

==== Taitung ====
- Chishang (新開園 / 池上)
- Guanshan (里壠 / 關山)
- Chengshan (城山)
- Ningpu (石寧埔 / 寧埔)
- Chuhu (竹湖)
- Boai (宜灣 / 沙汝灣)
- Xingang (成廣澳 / 小港)

== Culture ==
=== Language ===
==== Taivoan language ====
Taivoan that used to be spoken in inland Tainan in Southwestern Taiwan has a close linguistic relationship to Siraya and Makatao

The concept that Taivoan spoke the Siraya language has been rejected by many linguists, based on documentary and linguistic evidence. Since the January 2019 code release, SIL International has recognized Taivoan as an independent language and assigned the code tvx.

===== Documentary evidence =====
"De Dagregisters van het Kasteel Zeelandia" by the Dutch in the 17th century showed that, to communicate with the chieftain of Cannacannavo (Kanakanavu), the local official language Sinccan (Siraya) had to be translated to Tarrocquan (regarded as a dialect of Rukai or Paiwan), and Tevorang (Taivoan):

"...... in Cannacannavo: Aloelavaos tot welcken de vertolckinge in Sinccans, Tarrocquans en Tevorangs geschiede, weder voor een jaer aengenomen"

— "De Dagregisters van het Kasteel Zeelandia", pp.6–8

===== Linguistic evidence =====
Taiwanese linguist Paul Jen-kuei Li and Japanese linguist Shigeru Tsuchida compared the corpora of the Gospel of St. Matthew in "Siraya", the Sinckan Manuscripts, and other corpora recorded by Japanese scholars in the early 20th century, and found some significant sound and morphological changes among Siraya, Taivoan, and Makatao, by which they think the Gospel of St. Matthew written by the Dutch people in the 17th century in Taiwan, having long been regarded as in the Siraya language, had actually been written in the Taivoan language:

	Siraya	Taivoan	Makatao	PAn
Sound change (1)	r	Ø~h	r	< *l
Sound change (2)	l	l	n	< *N
Sound change (3)	s	r, d	r, d	< *D, *d
Sound change (4)	-k- -g-	Ø Ø	-k- ----	< *k < *S
Morphological change (suffices for future tense)	-ali	-ah	-ani	

==== Banana colloquial speech ====
The Taivoan people from Xiaolin, Alikuan, Pualiao in Kaohsiung, and Liuchongxi in Tainan have developed a mixed language called Banana colloquial speech (Chinese: 香蕉白話), in which the speakers input certain vowels and consonants in their mother tongues, whether Taiwanese or Taivoan, and generate a totally different speech. It is said the speech was developed during the rebellion of the Taivoan against Japanese colonial government during the early 20th century so that the Japanese could not understand what the Taivoan were saying.

Some examples of Banana colloquial speech still spoken among very few Taivoan people in Xiaolin and Pualiao:

Translation	Native language	Original phrase	Banana colloquial speech
Welcome! (lit. Sit down please!)	Taivoan	Miunun	Misiunsununsun
Thank you, goodbye (lit. beautiful)	Taivoan	Makahanru	Masakasahansanrusu
I	Taiwanese	guá	guasua
you	Taiwanese	lí	lisi
s/he	Taiwanese	i	isi
the Shrine	Taiwanese	kon-kài	konsonkaisai
hand	Taiwanese	tshiú	tshiusiu

==== "Local Lingua Franca" in Lakku ====
In Aug 1970, Japanese linguist Shigeru Tsuchida was told by one of his consultants that there was a Taivoan language in Lakkuli, such as:

"ancua ikasu akia tavoLaa gwaa no miaa"
(Translation: Why don't you know my name?)

"ikuu ka ku boo pakciu cima vo tavLaa"
(Translation: I haven't seen you for a long time, so I don't know who you are.)

According to the scarce corpora Tsuchida obtained, he doubted the language is apparently a mixture of Kanakanabu, Taiwanese, Mantauran-Rukai, Bunun, Japanese, and some unknown elements.

=== Religion ===
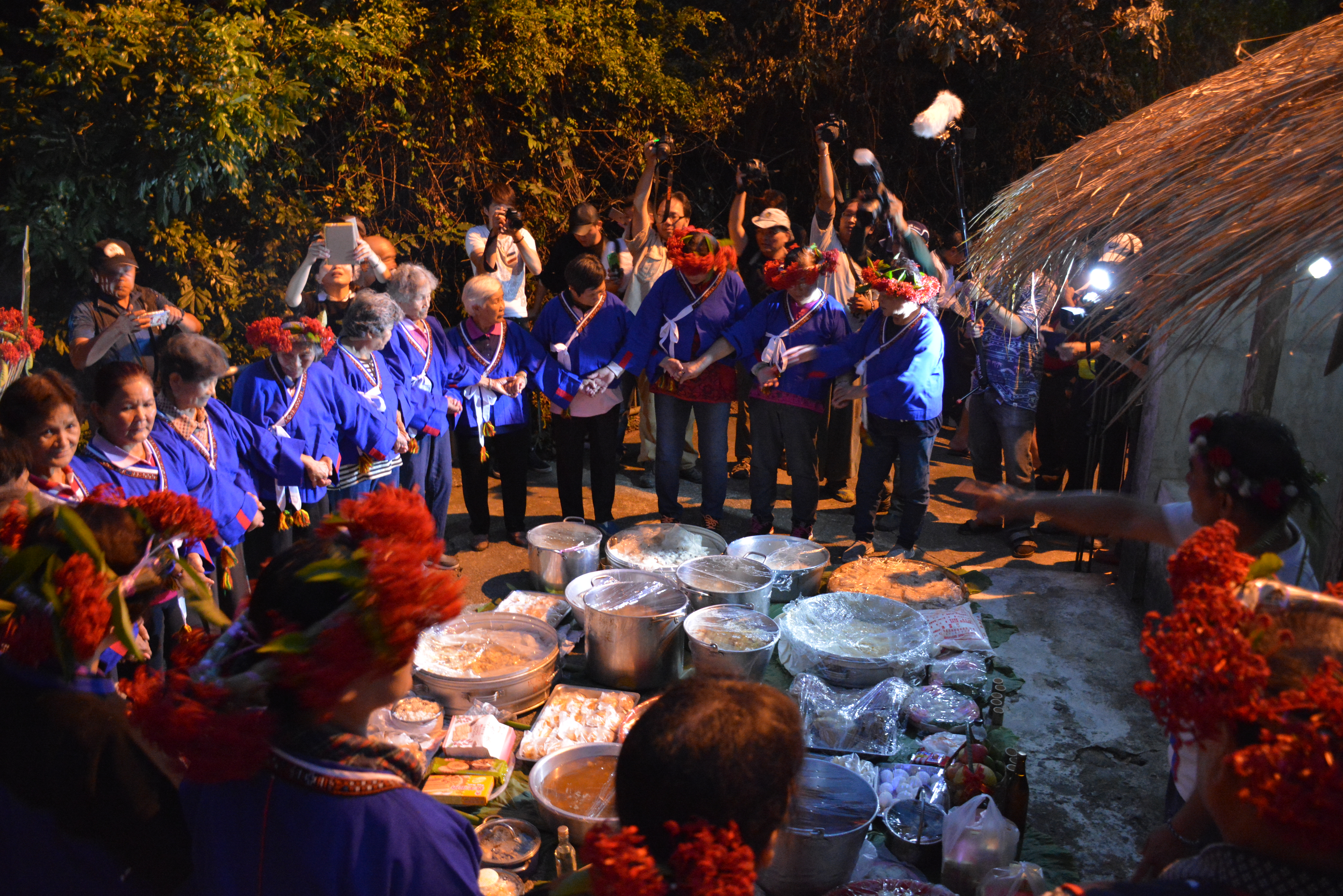
Taivoan Night Ceremony in Alikuan

Modern-day Taivoan people simultaneously practice traditional animism and Taoism influenced by Chinese immigrants, while only very few Taivoans practice Buddhism and Christianity. As a result, none of modern Taivoan communities, including Xiaolin, Alikuan, Pualiao, and Tuakhuhenn, has founded any church, compared to 83.94% of Taiwanese Highland indigenous people who have been converted into Christianity; only one of the 700-plus communities of the Taiwanese Highland indigenous people lacks a church.

In Taivoan animism, the most important religious concept is Hiang or Xiang (transliterated as 向 in Taiwanese), which cannot be translated literally but conveys the idea of sorcery, taboo, and magic. Any important religious articles related to Taivoan animism could be titled "Hiang", e.g. the wine and water blessed by the Highest Ancestral Spirits are called Hiang-tsiú (向酒, literally "Hiang-wine"; Taivoan: mimaw rarom) and Hiang-tsuí (向水, literally "Hiang-water"; Taivoan: mimaw palinlin), the bamboo erected in front of the Shrine for the Highest Ancestral Spirits to land onto the world is called Hiang-tik (向竹, literally "Hiang-bamboo"; Taivoan: malubiw), and the religious instrument made out of fishing trap to worship to the Highest Ancestral Spirits is called Hiang-Kô (向笱, literally "Hiang-fishing-trap"; Taivoan: agicin or kikiz).

The Taivoan Night Ceremony is held on the full-moon of the ninth lunar month every year. The six months following the Night Ceremony are called Khui-Hiang (開向, literally "lift the taboo"), when the indigenous people can practice hunting, wedding, and singing several religious songs, until the six-month Kìm-Hiang (禁向, literally, "taboo undertaken") takes place on the full-moon of the third lunar month the next year, when all the hunting and wedding practices are prohibited, and several religious songs should not be sung, until the next Khui-Hiang comes again.

=== Ceremonies and festivals ===
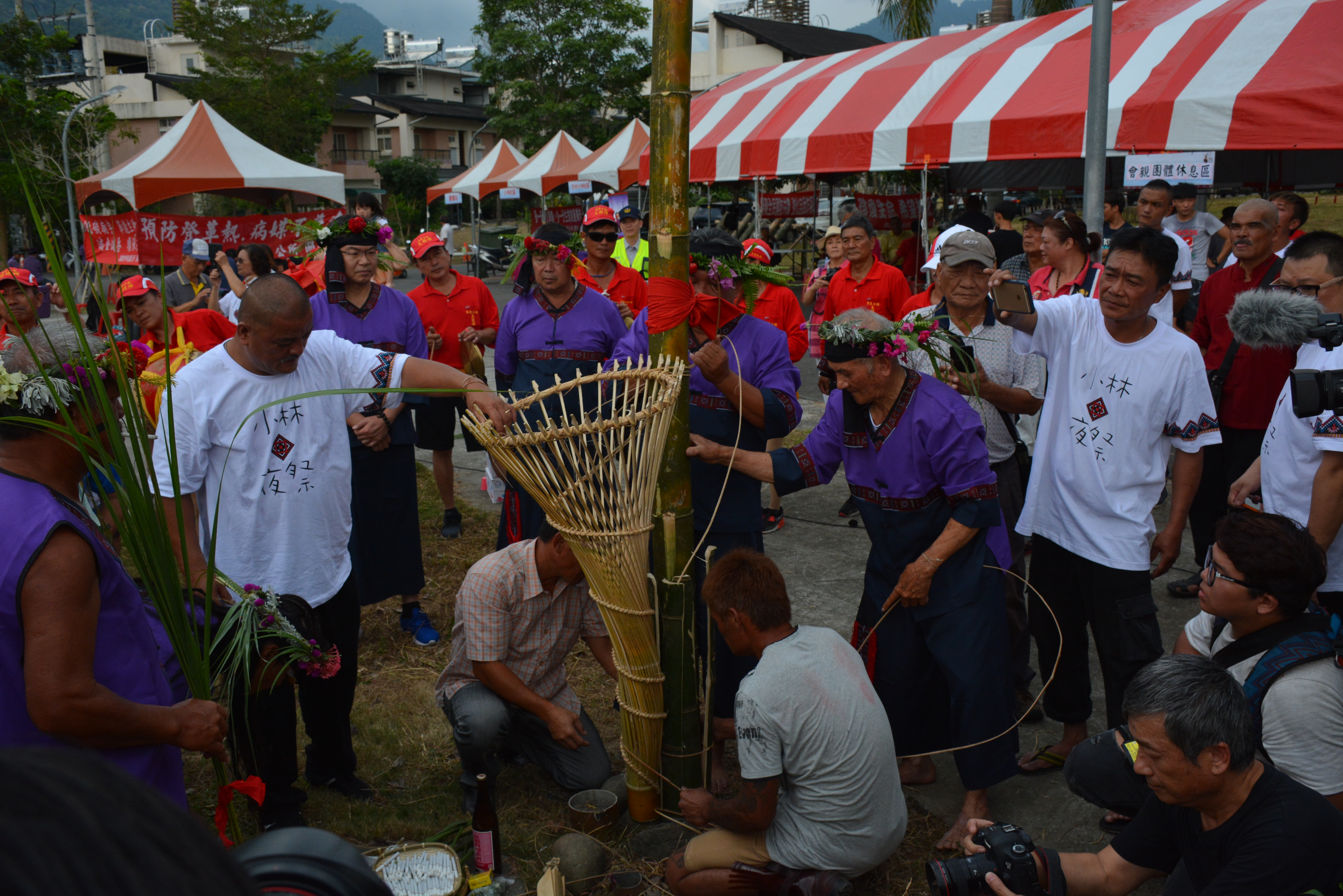
Malubiw-erection on the Night Ceremony in Xiaolin

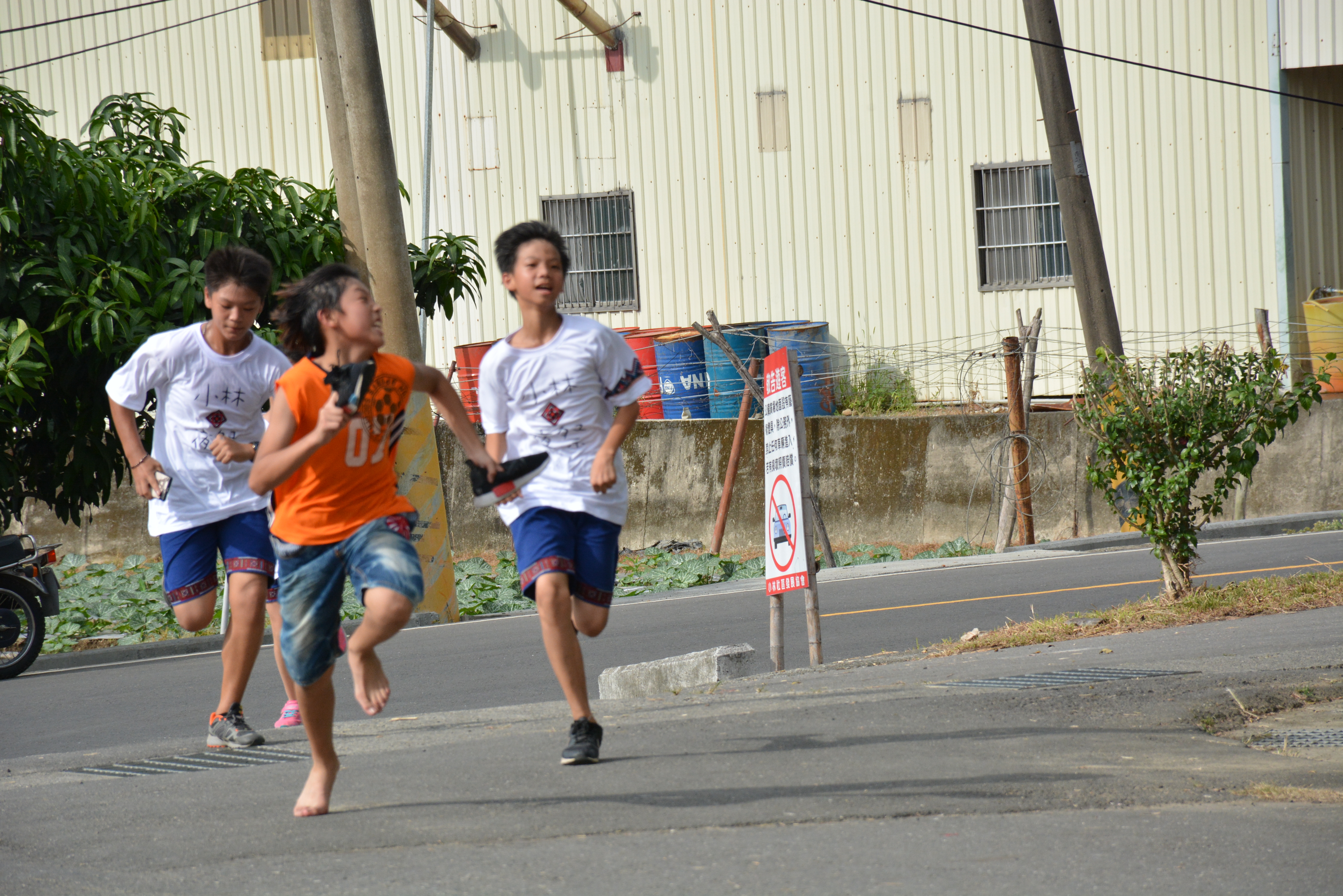
Taivoan boys practicing Patahim (footrace) in Xiaolin at the Night Ceremony

==== Night Ceremony ====
Many religious ceremonies used to be practiced by the Taivoan people, including Paka-taramay in Laulong, Too' pulaw, Samaok, and Kìm-Hiang in Alikuan and Xiaolin, but only the Night Ceremony along with Khui-Hiang are still in practice among Taivoan communities nowadays on the full-moon of the ninth lunar month every year.

The Night Ceremony (Chinese: 夜祭) is not only the day to lift the taboo (Khui-Hiang) but also the most important day for all the Taivoan people to worship their Highest Ancestral Spirits. The Highest Ancestral Spirits used to be called Anag in Taivoan but are now commonly called Thài-Tsóo (太祖, literally "the Grandmothers"; Taivoan: Anag) or Huan-Thài-Tsóo (番太祖, literally "the Indigenous Grandmothers") in Taiwanese. Also, some Taivoan elders refer to the Highest Ancestral Spirits as Kuba-Tsóo, literally "the Grandmothers in Kuba", as Kuba is the Taivoan word for the Shrine.

Many rituals or religious activities are or used to be practiced on the day of the Night Ceremony, including:

- Patahim (also Patahin or Tataheng): A running race which used to be practiced by the Taivoan young men to show their manhood and also as the men's training. Now Patahim is open to the indigenous people of all genders and ages.
- Too' pulaw: A religious practice in which the Taivoan people exchanged bottle gourds after Patahim. No longer practiced.
- Samaok: A religious practice in which the Taivoan boys and girls chased each other after Patahim. No longer practiced.
- Malubiw-erection: A thorny bamboo (Bambusa stenostachya Hackel) called Malubiw is erected in front of the Shrine as the ladder for the Highest Ancestral Spirits to land onto the earth.
- Unaunaw (also 牽戲 or Khan-Hì in Taiwanese): A religious practice in which all the Taivoans, holding hands, sing and dance to religious songs in a large circle in front of the Shrine in the evening, commonly regarded as the highlight of the Night Ceremony.

The Taivoan communities that still practice the Night Ceremonies are:

Kaohisung

- Xiaolin
- Alikuan
- Laulong

Hualien

- Dazhuang

Tainan

- Liuchongxi

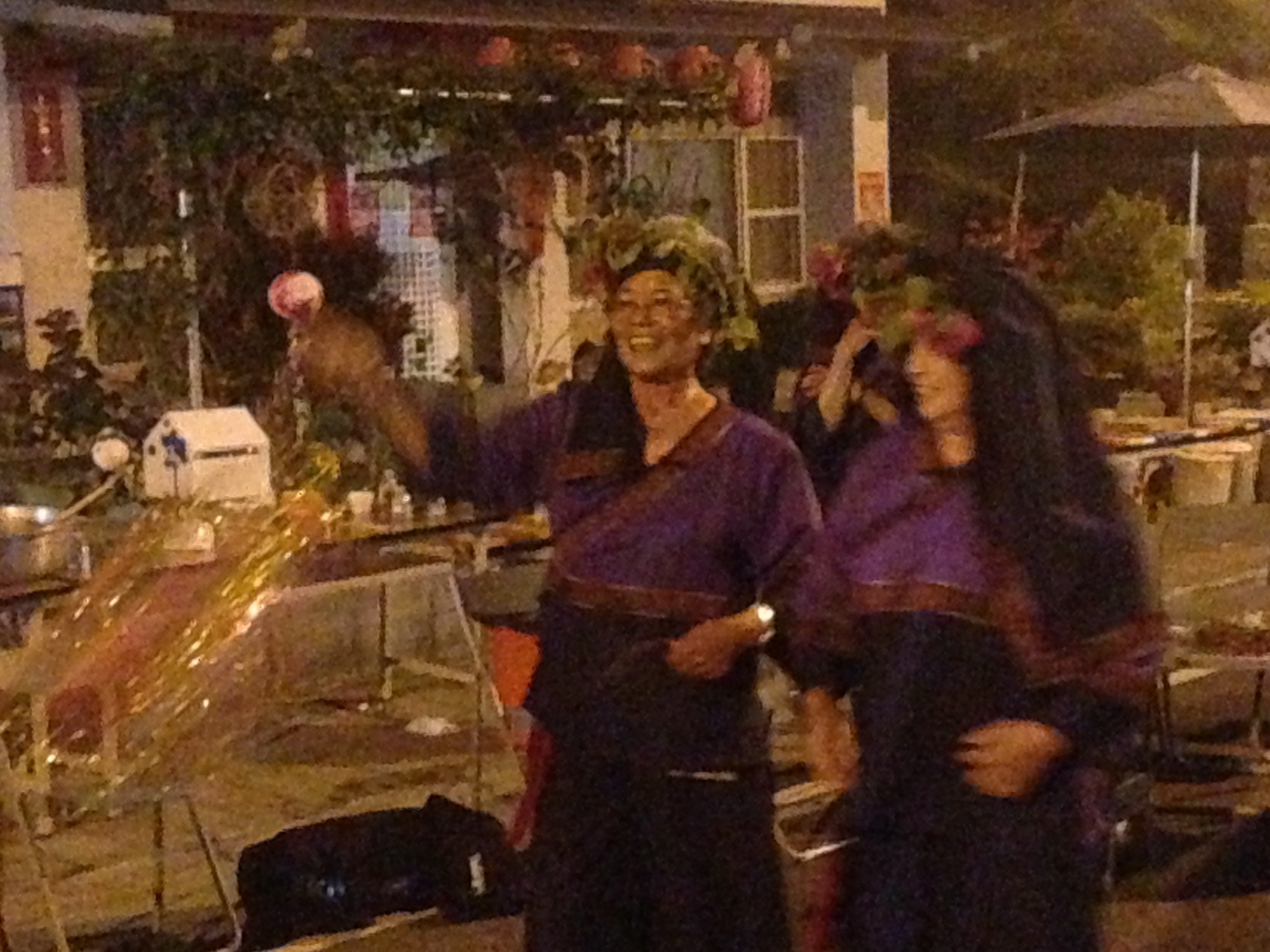
A Taivoan woman playing basket, a traditional activity among Taivoan women on festivals, in Sunlight Xiaolin on the Women's Night

==== Women's Night ====
While many Taiwanese indigenous peoples are regarded as matrilineal societies, only Taivoan in Xiaolin and Pinuyumayan people hold a specific traditional ceremony or holiday for the women. Many regard the two cheerful festivals for women only as legacies of the matrilineal practices of Taivoan and Pinuyumayan.

Decades ago, the Women's Night (Chinese: 查某暝) used to start from 8:00 pm or 9:00 pm on the full-moon of the first lunar month in Xiaolin, when all the local Taivoan women dressed beautifully, played games, and sang and danced in the streets. That evening, the Taivoan women could play games with the men or ask for money or cigarettes from a man, and the man could not refuse or get angry.

During Japanese rule, the women's night was considered a direct challenge to the patriarchy of the wider society by the Japanese government, and therefore the festival was dissuaded and prohibited by the Japanese police officers and teachers from 1940, according to the elders. Not until 2014 did the Taivoan people begin to revive the festival in Sunlight Xiaolin.

==== Taivoan Cultural Festival ====
The Taivoan Cultural Festival (Chinese: 大武壠歌舞文化節) has been held by the Taivoan residents in Sunlight Xiaolin in spring annually since 2015, both in the hopes of reviving and promoting the culture of Taivoan, especially traditional Taivoan music, and to strengthen self-recognition among Taivoan people in the Kaohsiung area.

=== Arts and crafts ===
==== Bamboo basket ====
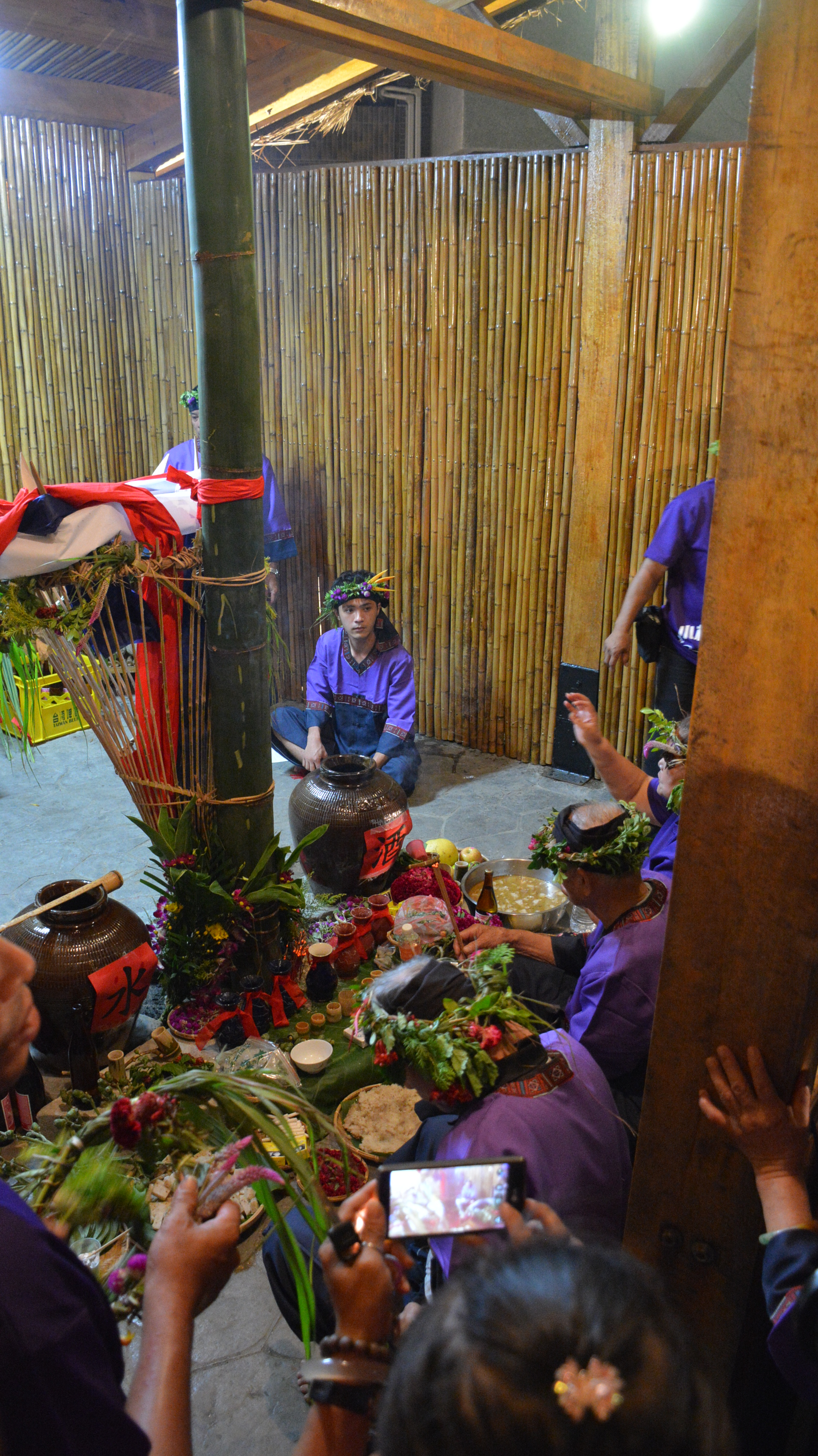
Taivoan men worshiping the ancestral spirits inside the Shrine at the Night Ceremony. A bamboo basket fastened to the central axial column can be seen.

A notable handicraft of Taivoan is bamboo basket (Taivoan: agicin or kikiz); it is used not only for fishing but also for religious purpose in Taivoan culture. As fishing trap is not uncommon among different Taiwanese indigenous peoples, Taivoan people are the only ones who sanctify bamboo fishing basket and grant it an important role at all levels of religious activity.

Every Taivoan Shrine (Taivoan: Kuba, Kuva, or Kuwa) has a kogitanta agisen (Chinese: 向神座; lit. 'Seat of Hiang Deities') in the middle of the Shrine, which is a combination of an agicin and the central axial column (Taivoan: Kayu, literally "tree, wood") of the Shrine. Taivoan people consider kogitanta agisen to be the place where the Highest Ancestral Spirits rest and the most sacred space inside the Shrine. As a common bamboo basket can be made of any kind of bamboo, a kogitanta agisen must be made of thorny bamboo (Bambusa stenostachya Hackel), implying its sanctity.

==== Embroidery ====
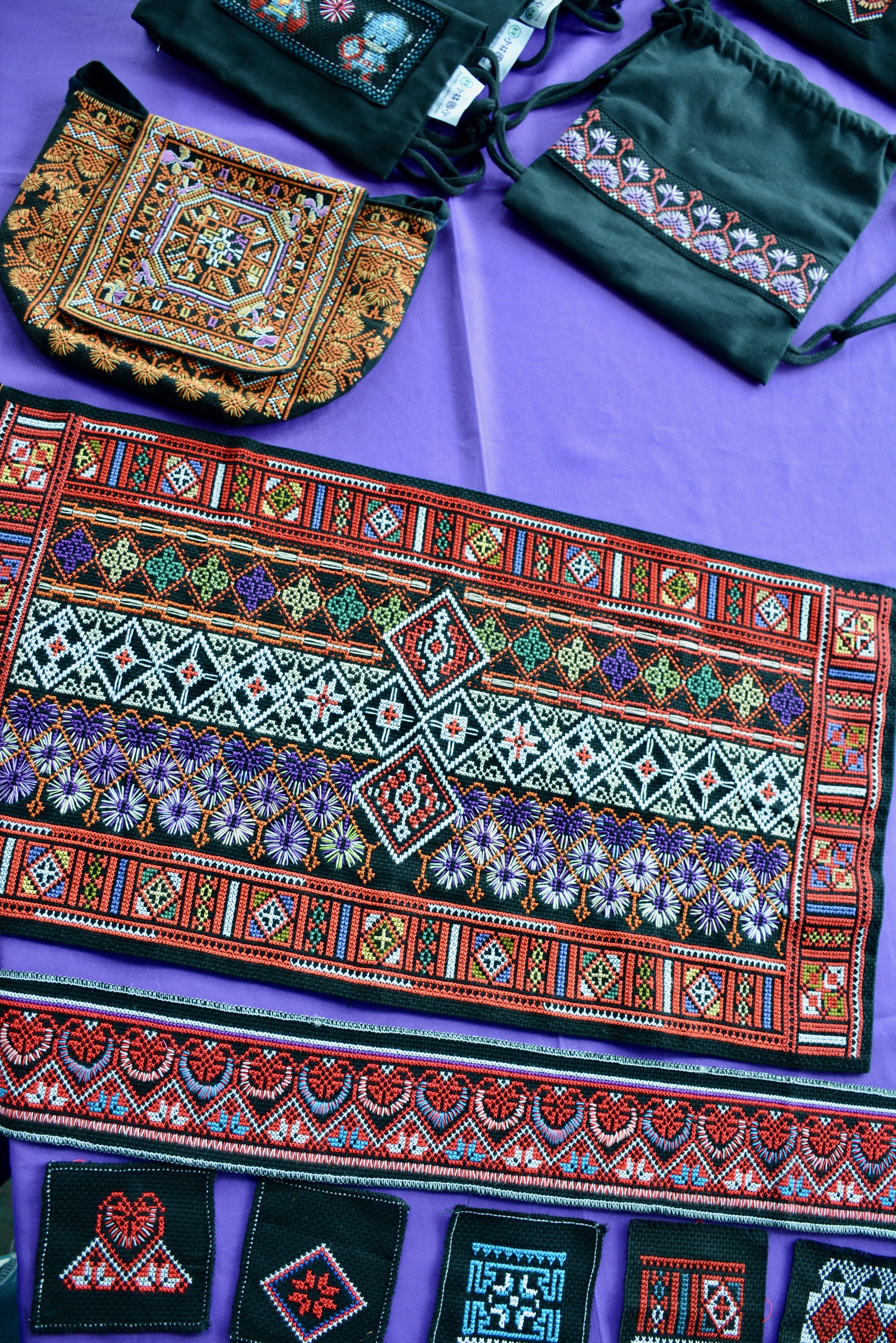
Taivoan embroideries displayed in a local exhibition in Xiaolin at the Night Ceremony

Embroidery is one of the most notable handicrafts of Taivoan people, unique by its variety of decorative patterns and colours, and making a significant cultural identification different from indigenous peoples nearby, e.g. Cou, Bunun, Rukai, and Siraya.

Some common patterns found in Taivoan embroideries are:

- Square or diamond shapes
- Thistle flowers (Taivoan: ayxaw)
- Extended diamond shapes
- Straight lines and mountain shapes
- Abstract geometric shapes
- Geometric flowers and leaves
- Geometric human faces and figures
- Insects, birds, and snakes
- Human-in-boat shapes
- Other geometric shapes like swastikas

The thistle flowers in Taivoan embroidery are the most unique, not seen in any other Taiwanese indigenous arts. Some local Taivoan people believe the thistle flower patterns stand for Cirsium lineare (Thunb.) Sch. Bip native to Jiasian, Kaohsiung, and some say they are globe amaranths (Gomphrena globosa L).

=== Music ===
Taivoan people own some of the most abundant folk music among all the Taiwanese Plain indigenous peoples, ranging from hymns for the Highest Ancestral Spirits that can only be sung in front of the Shrine or during Khui-Hiang, to antiphonal work songs mocking Chinese immigrants. Many of these have been recorded and even taught in local elementary schools in Taivoan communities.

==== Taboro ====
Taboro, or the so-called "the Song in the Shrine" among the Taivoan people, is a ceremonial song that can be sung only in the Shrine at the Night Ceremony; singing on any other occasion is strictly prohibited.

==== Kalawahe ====
Kalawahe, or the so-called "Out-of-the-Shrine Song" among the Taivoan people, is a ceremonial song that is normally sung when the indigenous people are walking out of the Shrine after worshiping to the Highest Ancestral Spirits at the Night Ceremony.

Some of the lyrics are:

Wa-he. Manie, he mahanru e, he kalawahe, wa-he.
Talaloma e, he talaloma e, he kalawahe, wa-he.
Tamaku e, he tamaku e, he kalawahe, wa-he.
Saviki e, he saviki e, he kalawahe, wa-he.
Rarom he, he rarom he, he kalawahe, wa-he.

As Taivoan language hasn't been in use for nearly a century, many ceremonial songs like "Kalawahe" can hardly be fully understood, but people could still try to catch a rough idea from some of the lyrics and the occasion of the song that it's about worship of the Highest Ancestral Spirits, e.g. tamaku "cigarette", saviki "betel nut", and rarom "water" that appear in the song are all the necessary offerings to the Highest Ancestral Spirits.

==== Lawkhema ====
Lawkhema is a cheerful Taivoan work song among men and women while working in mountains. While most of the lyrics are in Taivoan, the word "Lawkhema" (literally "Old Hen", implying a stingy person in Hakka Chinese) that appears in the song repeatedly is a Hakka Chinese term that the singers sing to mock Hakka people, showing the negative stereotype believed by many Taivoan people that the immigrants are mean and stingy.

=== Writings ===
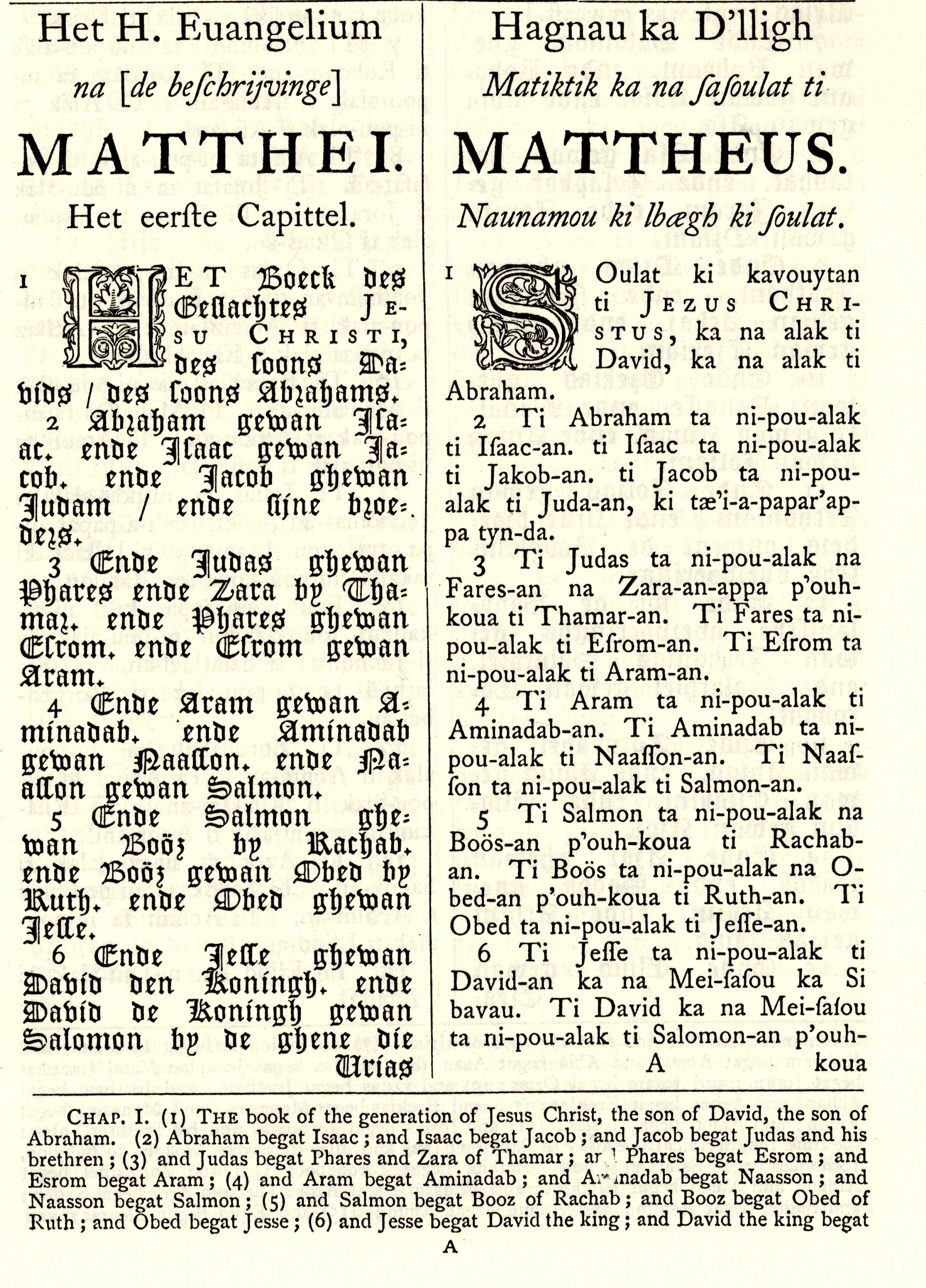
Gospel of St. Matthew in Dutch, Sinckan, Taivoan, and English. Original Dutch and Sinckan above is from 1661 by Daniel Gravius; English in small type was added in 1888 by Scottish missionary William Campbell.

==== Gospel of St. Matthew ====
The earliest written works in Taivoan language are "Hagnau ka d'llig matiktik, ka na Sasoulat ti Mattheus, ti Johannes appa.", titled "Het Heylige Euangelium Matthei En Joannis / oft: Overgeset Inde Formosansche Tale, Voor De Inwoonders Van Soulang, Mattau, Sinckan, Bacloan, Tavokan, En Tevorang" in Dutch, the Gospel of St. Matthew translated into Taivoan and Siraya in 1661. Although the writing is credited to Dutch missionary Daniel Gravius, recent linguistic research results have shown that it "was not the product of one person only: this is clear from the text itself, and [...] that there was a committee deciding over the final edition", as different languages, i.e. Taivoan and Siraya, are found in it.

An example of the Gospel of St. Matthew in Taivoan:

Tou kidi k'anna ni-matta-naunamou ta ti Jesus matta-sasou, mattœ'i-k'ma-hynna, Si-lala, pa-salikough-â ki vanna-oumi ki ryh, ka ni-mou-touk ta pei-sasou-an ki tounnoun ki vullu-vullum.
(Translation: From that time Jesus began to preach and to say, "Repent, for the kingdom of heaven is near".)

==== Sinckan Manuscripts ====
Many leases, mortgages, and other commerce contracts written in Siraya, Taivoan, and Makatao have been found among the communities in Southern Taiwan in the past one century, written in the Roman script taught by the Dutch missionaries. As most of the manuscripts are in the language of Sinckan or Siraya, they are called the Sinckan Manuscripts (新港文書) in combination.

An example of the Sinckan Manuscripts written in Taivoan:

lip san kih lang tausiah tamoring san to lagalaij san 5 o koh hiro to panah san 5 ki koh. komma ta na-ga-girah ti tanbingan. ki banitok 204 nio hon gin. komma ta solat kata, na inni imdaij.
(Translation: The contractor Tamoring from Tausiah has 5 units of farmland located in Lagalaij and 5 units of farmland located in Panah to be traded with Tan Bingan for 24 taels of indigenous silver. Thus written the contract, agreed by all the Inni's.)

=== Folklore ===
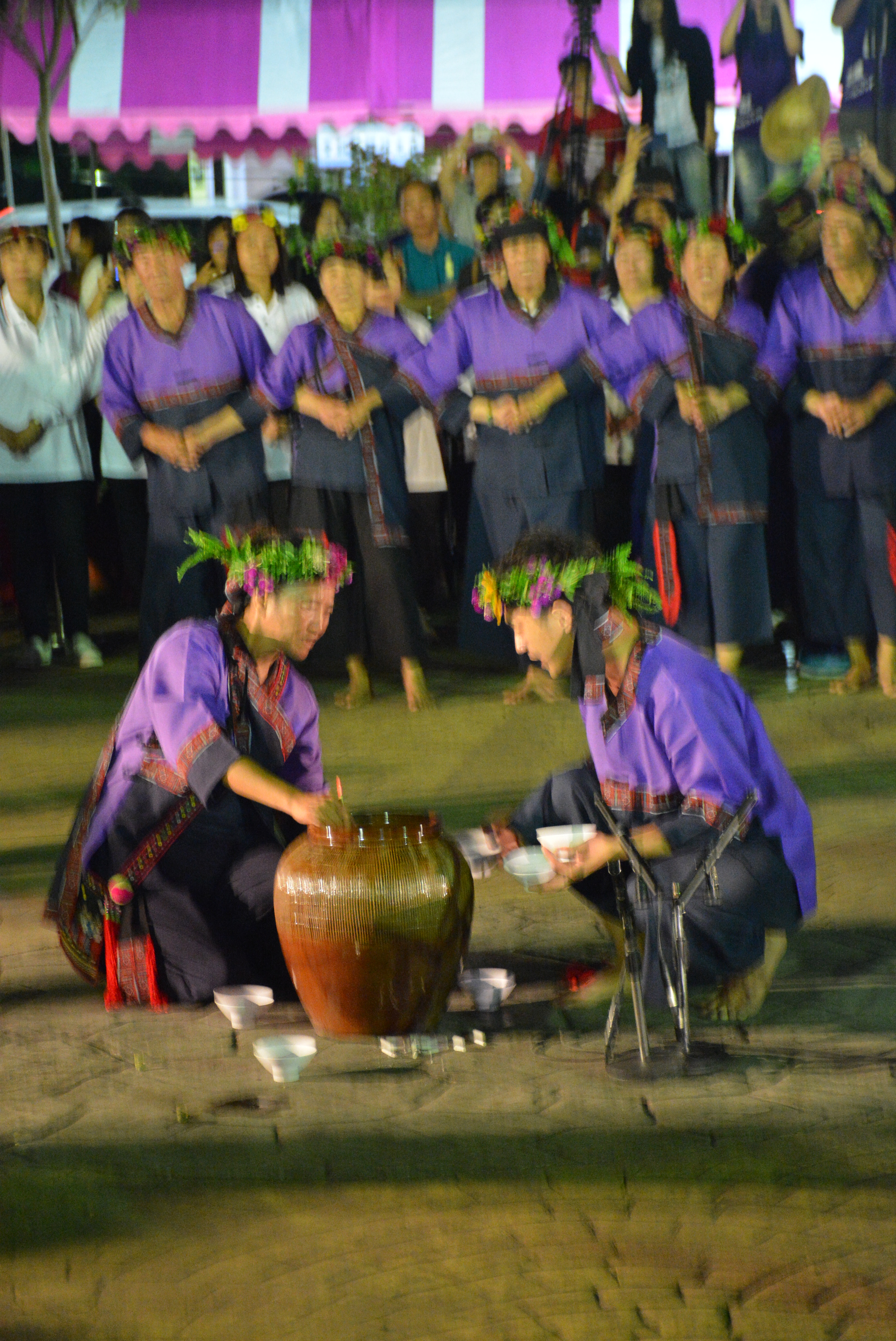
Taivoan people drinking Hiang-water after dancing at the Night Ceremony of Xiaolin

Not much folklore has been retained by modern-day Taivoan communities. Two examples of folklore that are still well-known even to the younger Taivoan generations are:

==== Soldiers of Hiang-Water ====
Taivoan people believe in the supernatural power of mimaw-pilinlin or Hiang-water, the water blessed by the Highest Ancestral Spirits. In Xiaolin, it is said when the local Taivoans in rebellion were escaping from the pursuit of Japanese army, the Hiang-water spilled out by them transformed into hundreds of soldiers, helping them defeat the Japanese.

==== Ancestral Spirit That Escaped ====
Taivoan people in Pualiao believe the forms of the local Highest Ancestral Spirits were seven pearls that flew back to the village only during the Night Ceremony. Decades ago, when a Taoist deity from Pingtung came by Pualiao and was trying to subdue the Highest Ancestral Spirits, the youngest of the seven spirits transformed into a pearl and escaped successfully. The local Taivoans believe the youngest spirit is still hiding on a certain tree in Pualiao.

== Nomenclature ==
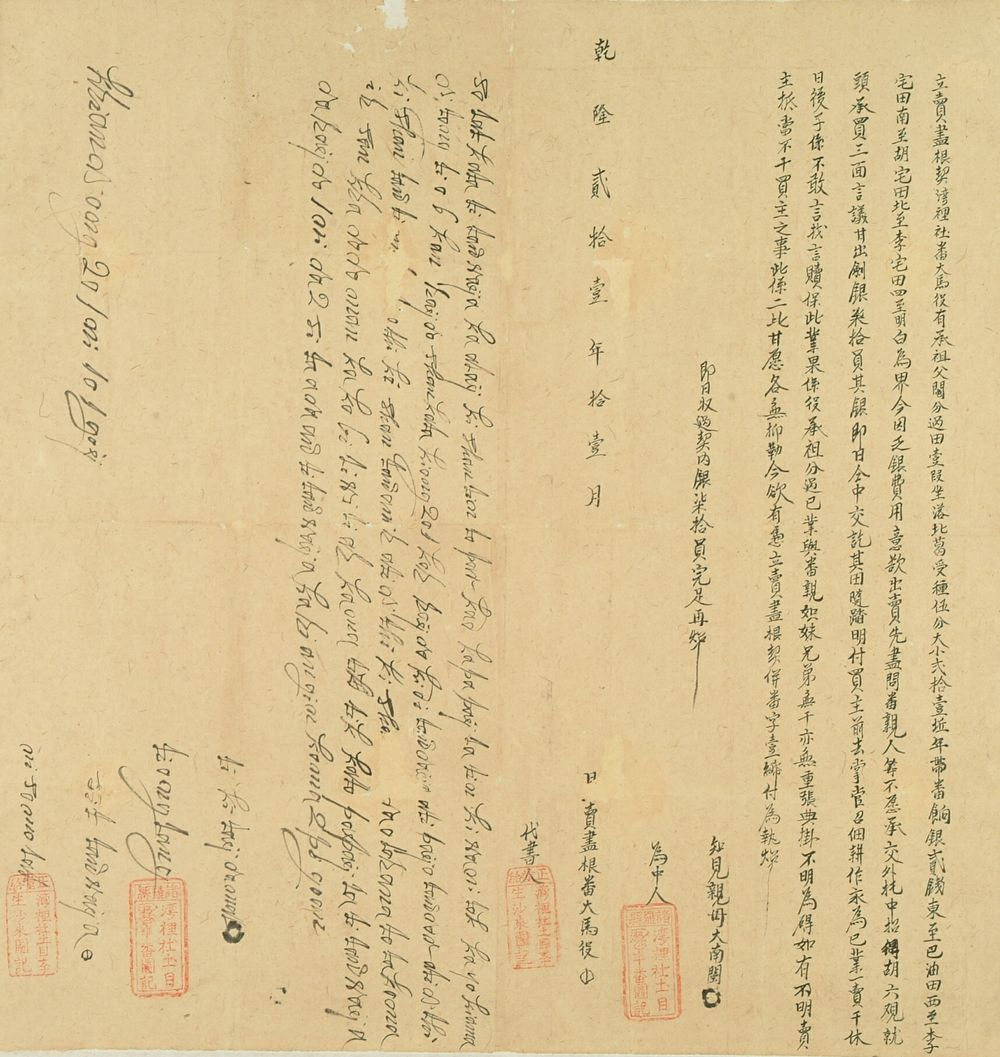
A Sinckan Manuscript dated in 1756 found in Wanli, written bilingually in Taivoan and Chinese. The Chinese name of the Taivoan contractor Tauvaija was stamped at the end of the contract.

Many Taivoan names and surnames are found in the Sinckan Manuscripts, mainly from the manuscripts found in the communities of Matau, Wanli, and Tevorangh.

=== Surnames ===
==== Tevorangh ====
- Savoos
- Zipang

==== Baccrouangh ====
- Kourey
- Sariang

==== Toukapta ====
- Lariti
- Lohraong
- Mourahay
- Palaong
- Pali / Pani
- Piah
- Roual
- Salo / Saro
- Sautok
- Tava
- Tapinahi
- Tavila / Tvilah / Tvila
- Vangol
- Vil
- Vila / Vilah
- Zahat

Terrijverrrijvagangh

- Covol

=== Names ===
==== Tevorangh ====
- Cicia
- Daa
- Dapare
- Dapou
- Davolich
- Doclingh / Doelingh
- Durax
- Lavore / Lapor / Loevor
- Sangarau / Sangarou / Sangarony / Souguarouw
- Tamalavoos
- Tamoring
- Taulangh / Taulang / Touliangh
- Tavare
- Tehangh / Tohongh
- Toefingit / Toelingit
- Tohoug
- Vaking / Vakingh

==== Tamani ====
- Dapare

==== Baccrouangh ====
- Arisau / Arissau / Arissouw / Arrouso
- Baijo
- Capule / Capoule / Capoele
- Cmang
- Dangdang
- Dauvaha
- Dava
- Dika
- Dodong
- Gafiel
- Ilas
- Karingat
- Karinget
- Kasian / Kasiang
- Ladang (f.)
- Lapoij
- Ngatlat
- Ngiti / Tongili (f.)
- Oki
- Olaeij / Olaij (f.)
- Patol
- Saaij
- Sapoule
- Saraeij
- Saraij (m.)
- Sovaijo
- Taavang
- Tackarey
- Tackavier / Tasapier
- Tadiho
- Taeijvari
- Taijpalak
- Taijramal
- Taijrap
- Taimining
- Takalaij / Tackarey
- Takalang (m.)
- Takatang
- Takiong
- Takomasong
- Takuka
- Tanguel
- Taovang
- Tapaijlu
- Tarihi / Tarihe
- Tarilah
- Tarilas
- Taroaeij / Taroaij
- Tauvaija
- Tavangolt
- Tavarau
- Tavatok
- Tavinoij
- Tavoris
- Tongili (f.)
- Tongiti / Tongili (f.)
- Vasikan
- Vatarak

==== Toukapta ====
- Alis
- Dapis
- Daros
- Dika
- Dorao
- Dorong
- Doswan
- Do(uai)
- Foncksui / Tunchuij
- Ihdang / Idangh (m.)
- Ikaraijo / Karaijo
- Ilah
- Illong / Ilong (f.)
- Inaij / Inaj
- Kalang
- Kapoli
- Kapta
- Karaijo (f.)
- Kasiang / Kasian
- Laat
- Laho / Lahuo
- Lapong
- Likong
- Lautia
- Livo
- Mare / Naile
- Maijiong
- Ovang
- Paraj
- Parasia
- Parasin
- Pingo
- Pokal
- Poule
- Porak
- Rahaij
- Raijsot
- Ravong
- Riong
- Ripon
- Salat
- Sambdau
- Sannaij
- Savang
- Sinno / Sino
- Sovalaij
- Sovariang
- Taavang
- Tadiho / Tadiko
- Tadise
- Tahovan
- Taijramal
- Tailong
- Taivari
- Takada (f.)
- Takalang / Taccaran (m.)
- Talaij / Tallaij
- Tamaai
- Tamillanah
- Taongan
- Tapanga
- Taporo
- Tarassi
- Taro
- Taroaij / Taroaeij
- Tarokaj / Tarokaij
- Tauatal (f.)
- Taukia
- Taulikong
- Taunih
- Tava
- Tavangol
- Tavi
- Tavoris / Tavouris / Tavoise
- Tidaros
- Tilaij
- Tingngaijo
- Tolo
- Tulologh / Luluch / Loeloch / Lonoch
- Vaijdau
- Vaking
- Valivilj
- Valoffmau
- Varahol
- Varasaij
- Vatarah
- Vaviri
- Verongh
- Vilah
- Vongsoey / Vonssoey / Vonsoy / Vangsoey

Terrijverrrijvagangh

- Dorap

Notes

- (m) stands for male name and (f) for female names.

=== Modern surnames ===
Due to close contact with Chinese immigrants in Southern Taiwan, Taivoan people have been influenced by Chinese culture and have adopted Chinese surnames. Certain Chinese surnames are more common than others among different Taivoan communities:

Taivoan communities	Common Surnames Adopted by the Taivoans									
Xiaolin	Pan (潘)	Liu (劉)	Wang (王)	Mao (毛)	Xu (徐)					
Alikuan	Pan	Liu	Wang			Jin (金)				
Laulong	Pan	Liu				Jin	Xiang (向)			
Tuakhuhenn	Pan	Liu	Wang							
Pualiao	Pan	Liu	Wang			Jin		Ye (葉)		
Pangliao	Pan	Liu							Yang (楊)	Jiang (江)
Suannsamna	Pan	Liu								Jiang
Lakku	Pan	Liu								
Baktsu	Pan	Liu								
Pehtsuitsuann	Pan	Liu	Wang							

Pan (潘) is the most dominant Chinese surname, adopted by almost all the Taiwanese Plain indigenous people, as the character means "indigenous people (番) living by the water (氵)". It is the counterpart of Kao (高) for the Taiwanese Highland indigenous people, which means "high (高)".

As almost all of the Taiwanese Plain indigenous peoples speak Taiwanese in daily life, it is almost impossible to tell which ethnic group they are from simply by the languages spoken. Sometimes the surnames give a clue for an outsider; for example, one can guess a member from the Bang family in Xiaolin should have Siraya ancestry instead of Taivoan, as Bang (邦) is a dominant Chinese surname in many Siraya communities, where the surnames like Pan and Liu that are common among Taivoan communities can hardly be found.

== Gallery ==
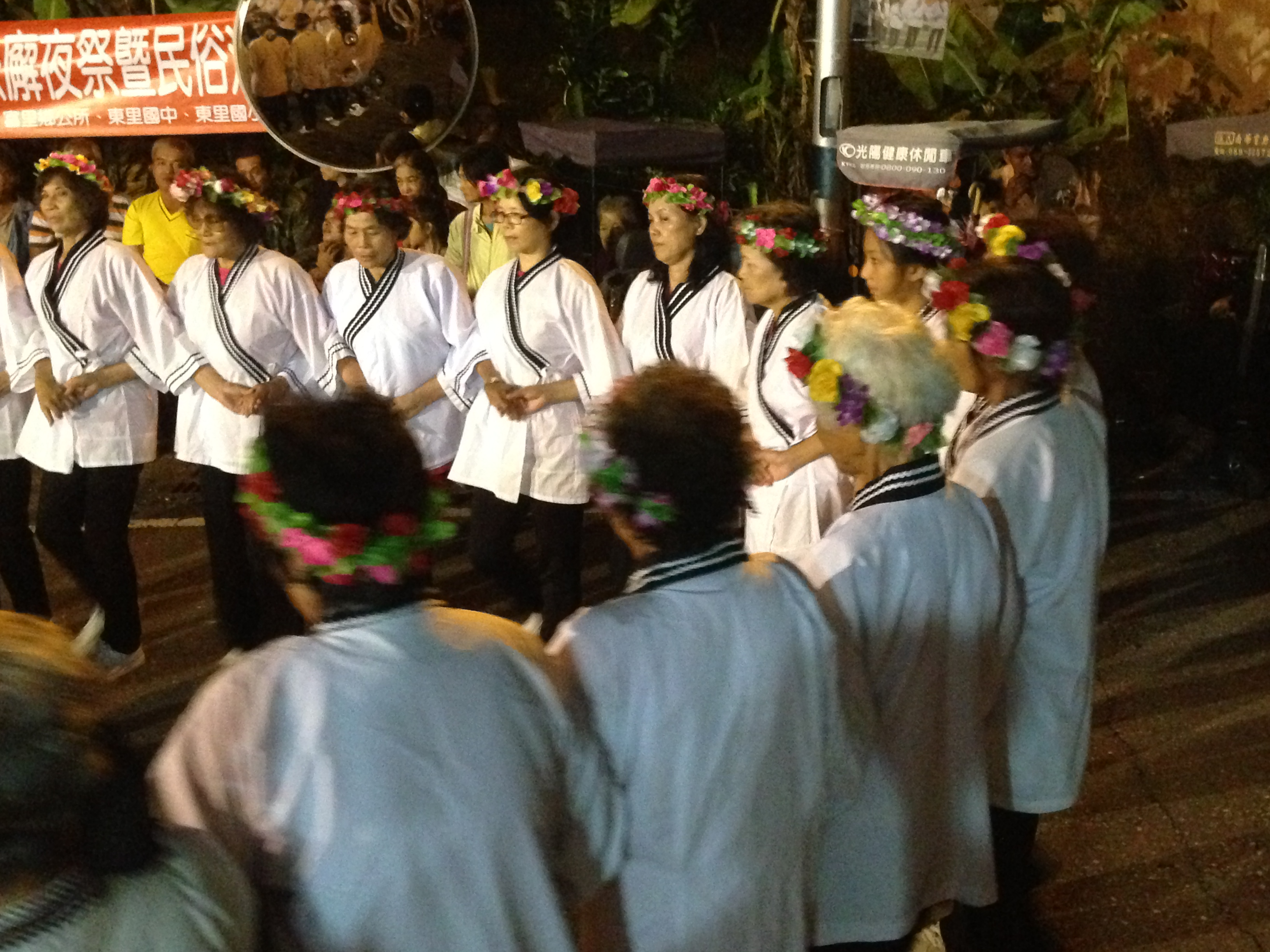
The Night Ceremony of Taivoan in Dazhuang, Hualien

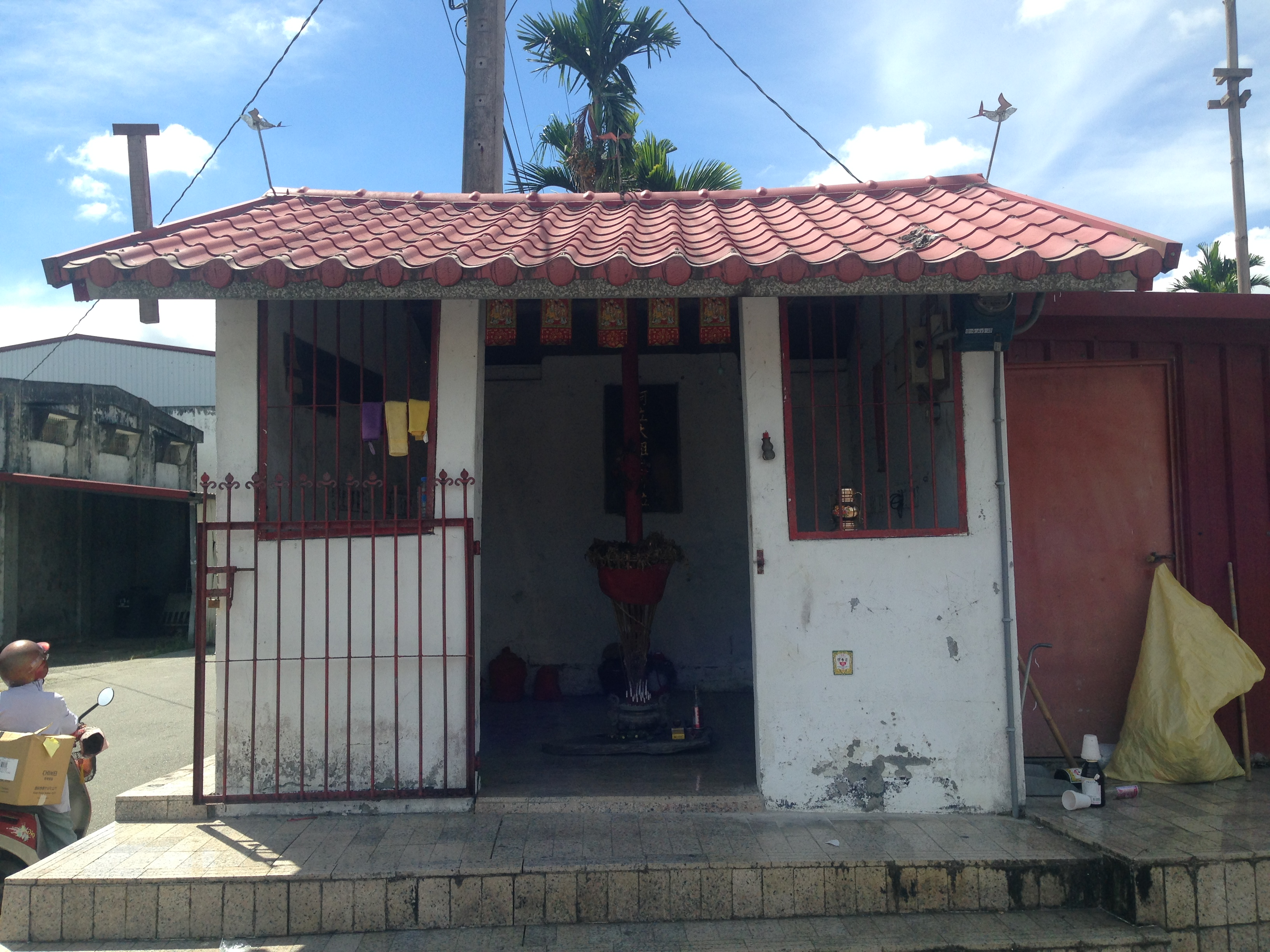
The Shrine of Taivoan in Dazhuang, Hualien

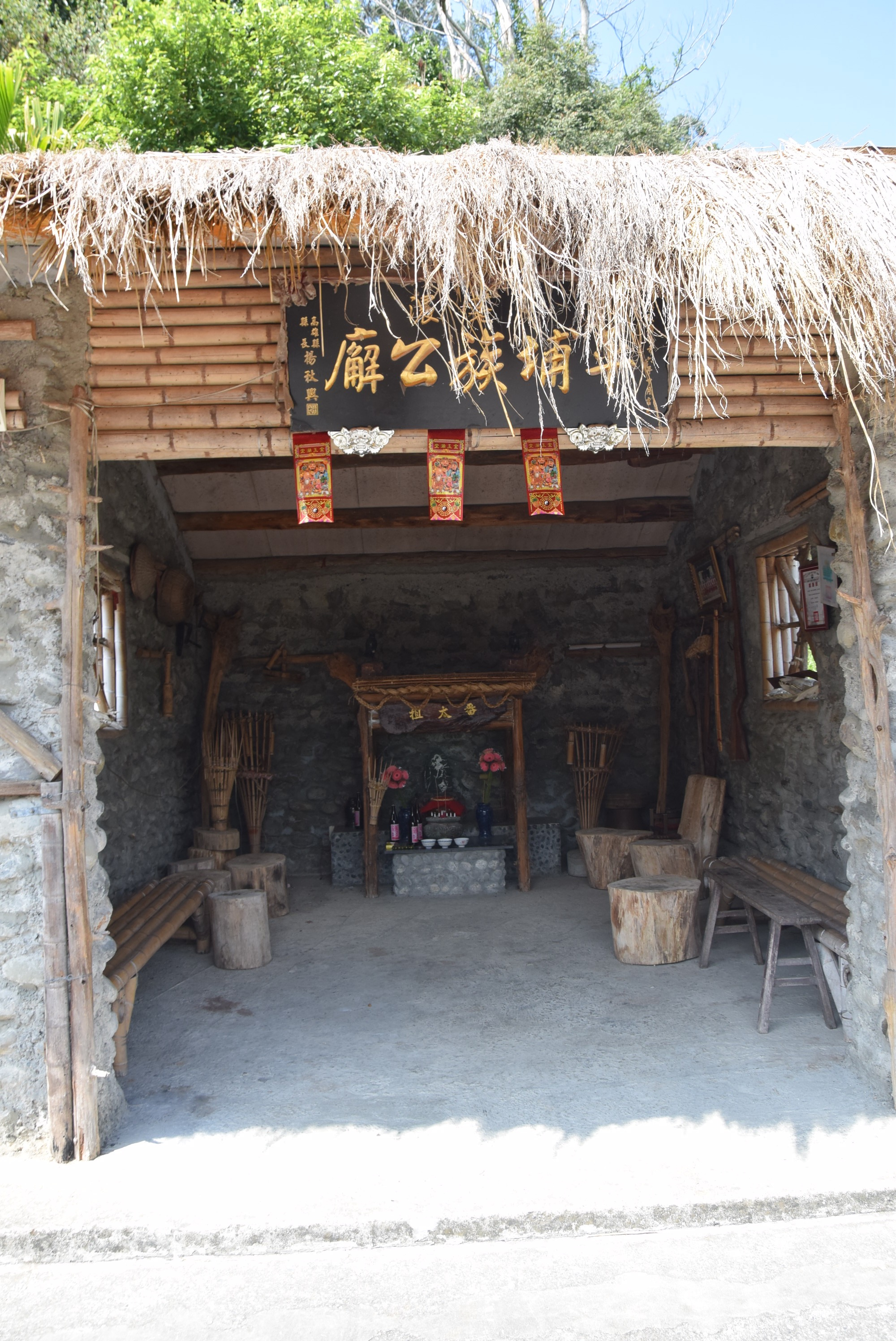
The Shrine of Taivoan in Laonong, Kaohsiung

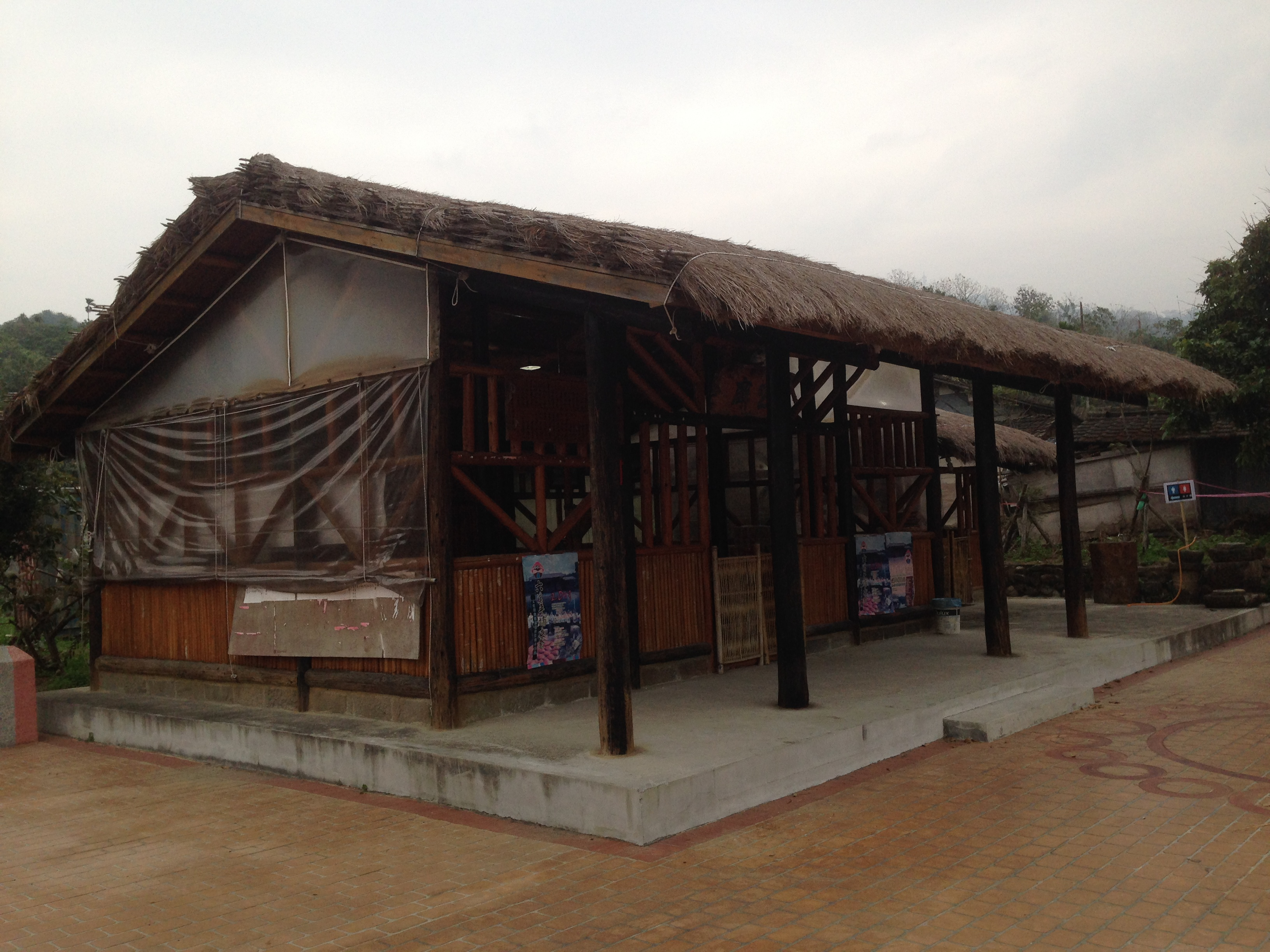
The Shrine of Taivoan in Liuchongxi, Tainan

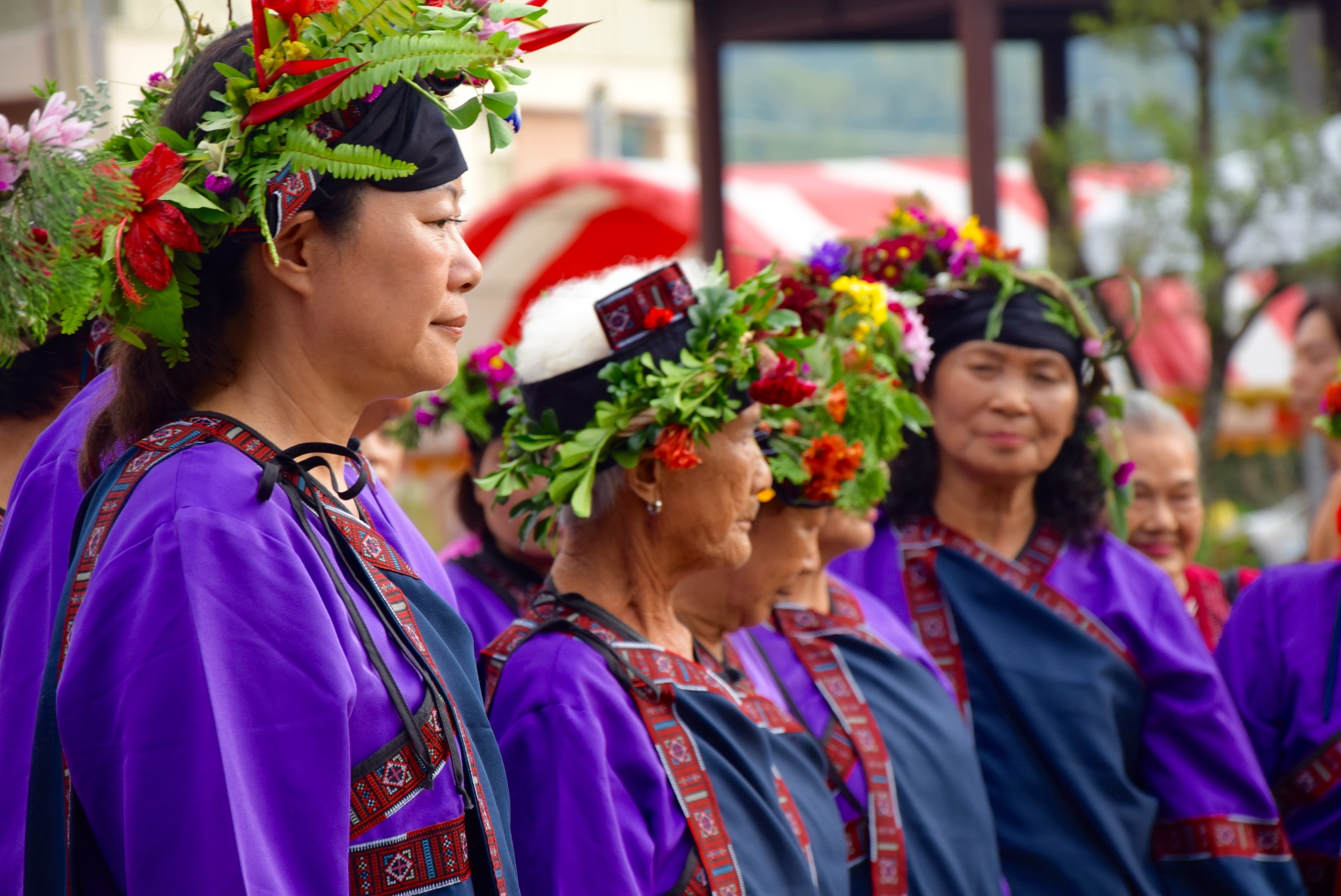
Taivoan people in traditional dress at the Night Ceremony in Xiaolin

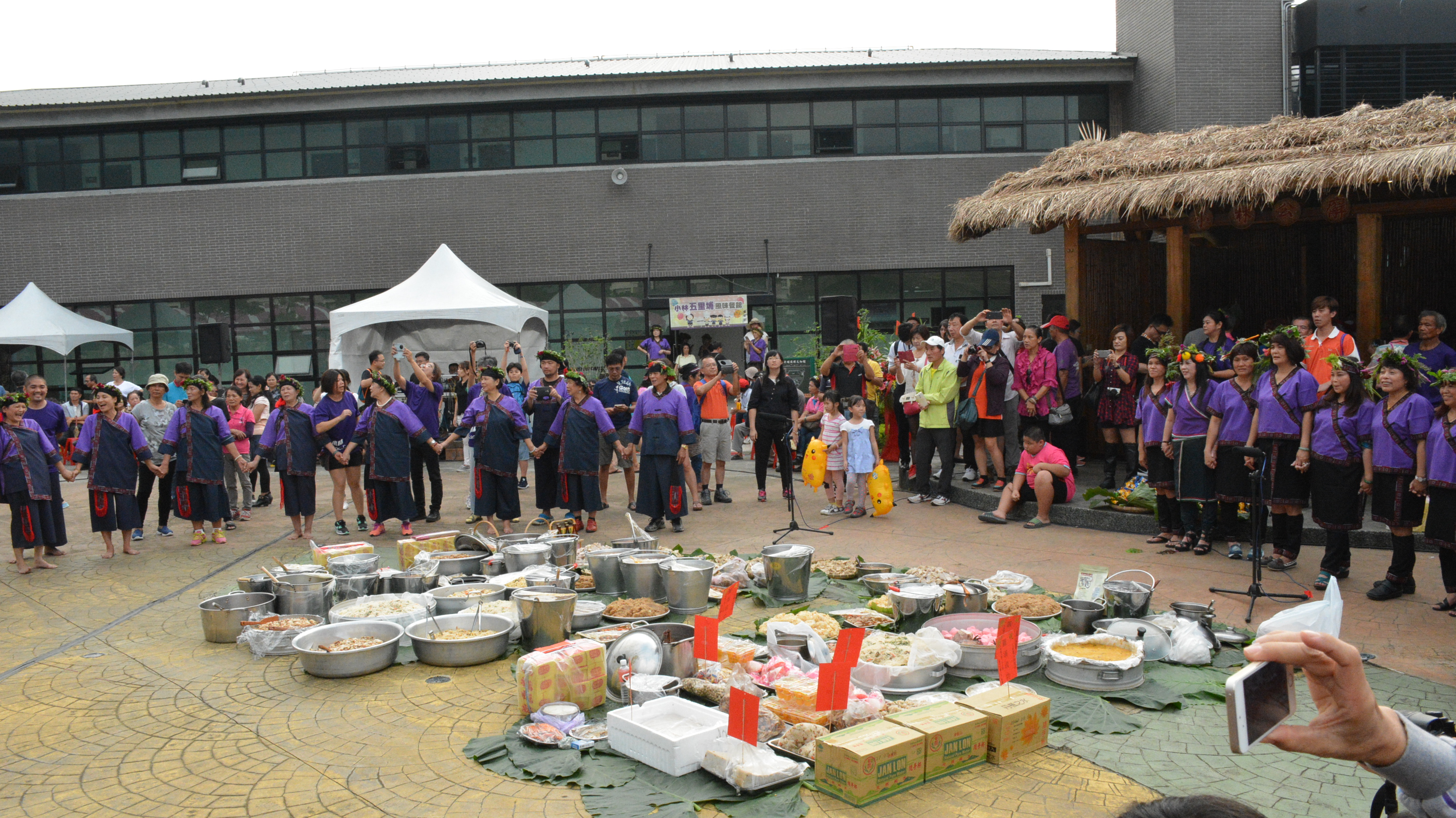
Taivoan people in Xiaolin offer to the ancestral spirits at the Shrine at the Night Ceremony

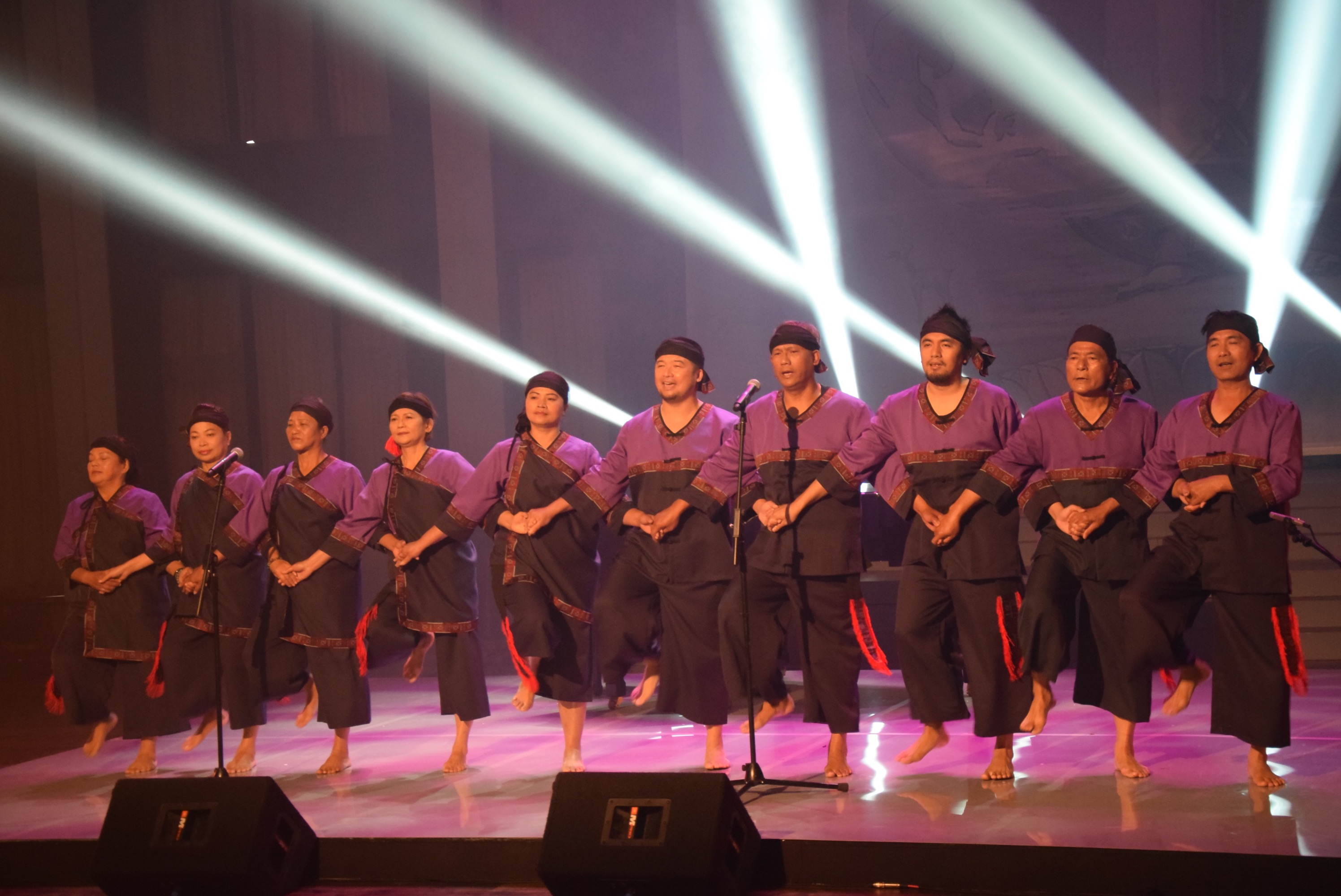
Taivoan Dance Theatre performing traditional song and dance

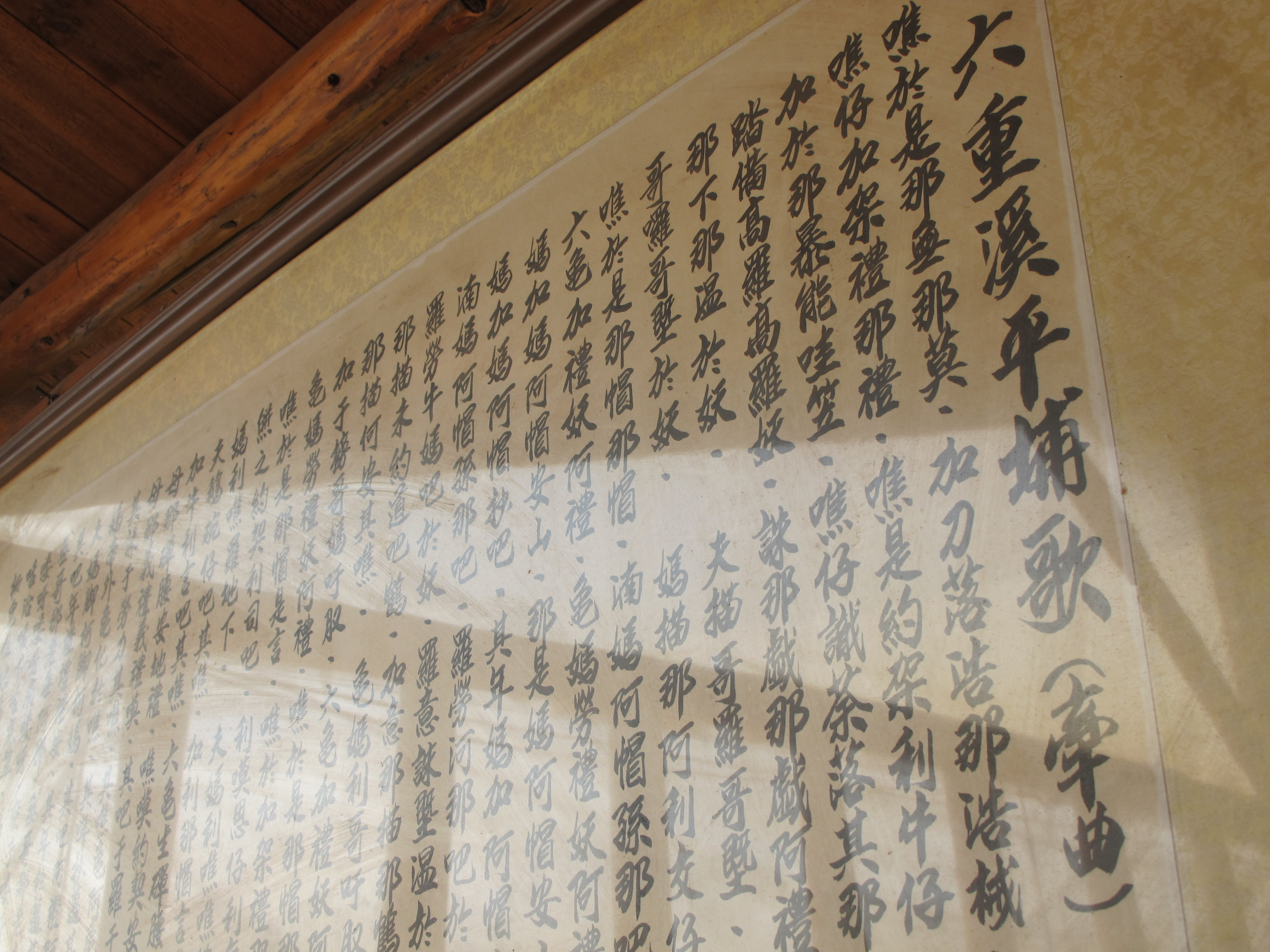
Taivoan ceremonial song transliterated in Chinese characters in the Shrine of Liuchongxi, Tainan

== See also ==
- Taivoan language
- Taiwanese indigenous peoples
- Taiwanese Plain Indigenous Peoples
