= Dazhuang =

Dàzhuāng (大庄) could refer to the following locations in China:

- Dazhuang, Yinan County, in Yinan County, Shandong
- Dazhuang Township, Minhe County, in Minhe Hui and Tu Autonomous County, Qinghai
- Dazhuang Township, Gangu County, in Gansu

Dàzhuāng (大庄) may also refer to the following location in Taiwan:

- Dazhuang, Hualien County, Taiwan, a community of indigenous Taivoan, Makatao, and Siraya in Fuli, Hualien
