= Dazhuang, Hualien County, Taiwan =

Community in Fuli, Hualien County, Taiwan

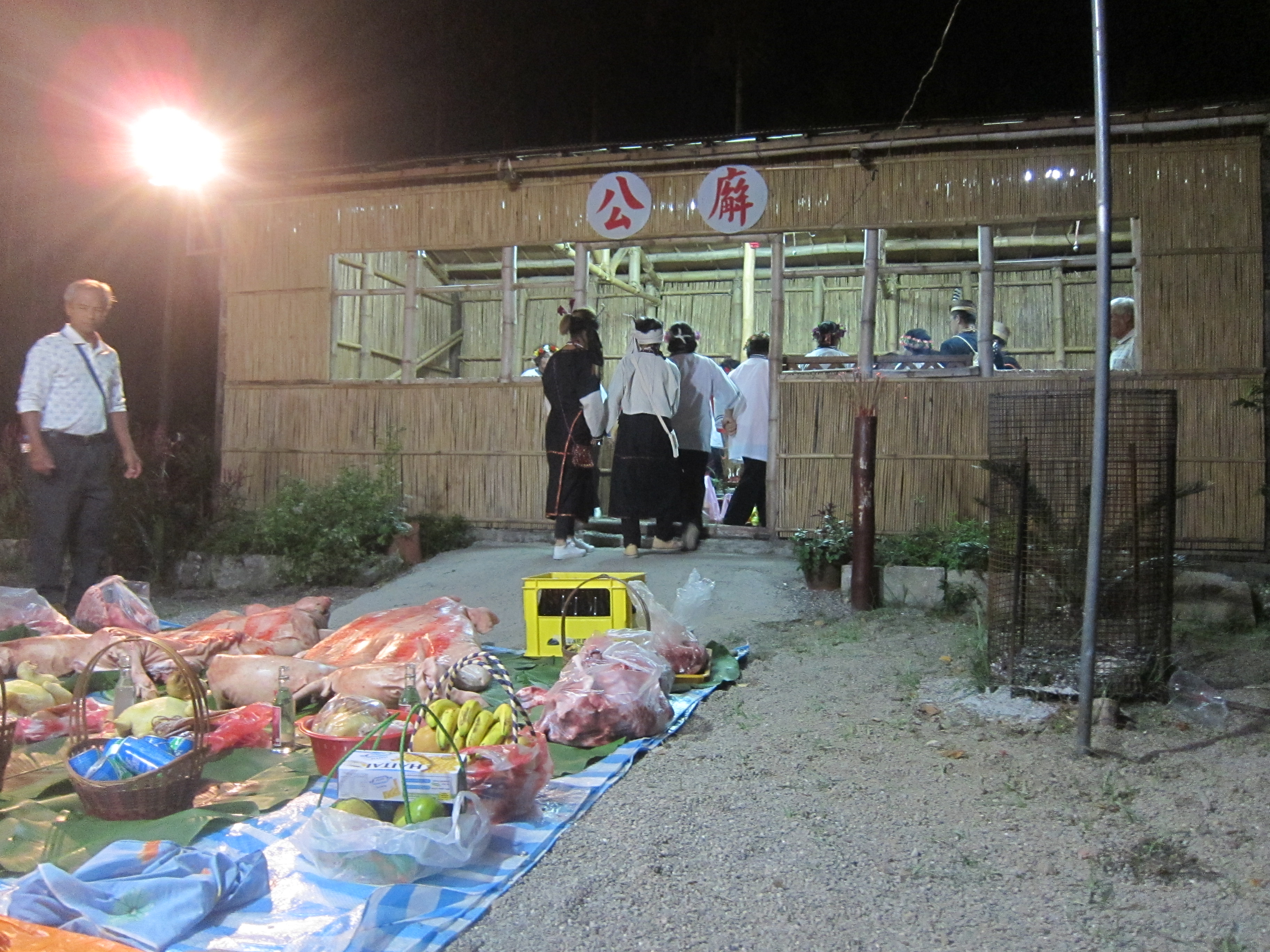
Kuba or the Men's Gathering House of indigenous Taivoan people in Dazhuang during the annual Night Ceremony.

Dazhuang (Chinese: 大庄; Taiwanese Romanization: Tuā-tsng) is a community located in Tungli Village, Fuli Township in Hualien County, Taiwan. Dazhuang used to be an old community of Amis, until 1845 when some plain indigenous people started to migrate from Southern Taiwan to here. It was the most populous community in Fuli between Qin dynasty and Japanese occupation period, and so called the name Tuā-tsng (pinyin: Dazhuang), which means "a big village" in Taiwanese.

Nowadays most residents are ethnically Taivoan or Makatao, who call themselves Taivoan, Taiburan, or Tau, Makatau, when the local culture, especially religious shamanism, is strongly featured by Taivoan. The Night Ceremony is still held on the 15th day of the 9th lunar month, just the same as the rest of Taivoan communities nationwide. Dazhuang has been the most populous community of Plain indigenous peoples in Eastern Taiwan.

== See also ==
- Taivoan
- Makatao
