= Banana colloquial speech =

Cant spoken by the Plain indigenous peoples of Taiwan

- Native to: Southern Taiwan
- Language family: Taiwanese and Taivoan-based creole: Banana colloquial speech

Language codes
- ISO 639-3: –

Banana colloquial speech (Taiwanese: Keng-chio-pe̍h-ōe or simply Keng-chio-pe̍h) or Banana colloquial dialect is a creole language or cant spoken among the Plain indigenous peoples since the Japanese-rule period to the present in hill areas of southern Taiwan, especially Kaohsiung and Tainan. It is primarily a mixture of Taiwanese, and sometime Taivoan language in Jiasian, Kaohsiung.

== History ==
Banana colloquial speech is mainly circulated among Taivoan and Siraya communities in hill areas. Most Han ethnic groups are not familiar with this cant. Some scholars speculated that the cant was invented during the early 20th century during Taiwan's Japanese occupation period by the Plains Indigenous peoples and Han ethnic groups in Tainan and Kaohsiung to resist the Japanese. In July and August 1915, as well as in 1933, a series of anti-Japanese incidents occurred in southern Taiwan, all centered around the Taivoan communities in the Tainan Yujing Basin and Jiaxian, Kaohsiung. The failure of the anti-Japanese resistance resulted in the hiding and moving of many rebels after the destruction of many families and even entire villages by the Japanese government. Consequently, the cant was invented during the resistance.

== Variation ==
=== Siaolin, Pualiao ===
The way the Banana colloquial speech is used in Kaohsiung, mixed with Taiwanese or Taivoan language, may differ slightly from other areas, but there is consistency among the Taivoan communities that the speakers can communicate with each other. Here are some examples based on the cant provided by residents of Siaolin and Pualiao, both of which are Taivoan communities:

Meaning	Banana colloquial speech	Taivoan	Taiwanese
welcome, please be seated	misi unsun unsun	miunun	
thank you, goodbye	masa kasa hansan rusu	makahanru	
I	guasua		guá
you	lisi		lí
he, she	isi		i
the Shrine	konson kaisai		kong-kài
hand	tshiusiu		tshiú

=== Goping ===
Another dialect of the Banana colloquial speech was provided by Zhu Yuanshun from Goping village, Neimen District, Kaohsiung. The formation of the cant is done by mapping one original syllable of Taiwanese Hokkien to two syllables of the cant. In this dialect, the first consonant fixed as [l] and the second vowel fixed as [i]. This conversion method is completely different from that used in the Taivoan area.

Meaning	Banana colloquial speech	Taiwanese
I	賴語（luagi）	guá
you	哩語（ligi）	lí / gí
he, she	哩依（lii）	i
hello	哩語老喜（ligi lohi）	lí hó / gí hó
thank you	捩喜捩喜（liasi liasi）	siā
many thanks	嘮弟冽是（loti liasi）	to-siā
welcome	鑾興龍銀農跟寧瑩（luanhin lingging longking limim）	huan-gîng kong-lîm
eat	冽舌（liahtish）	tsia̍h
rice	蛋編（lngping）	pn̄g
sleepy	倫勤（lunkhin）	khùn
father	老依磊比（laui lepi）	lāu-pē
mother	老依ㄌ米（laui lubi）	lāu-bú
older sister	依ㄚ累弟（ia liatsi）	a-tsí
younger brother	溜係累弟（liosi liti）	sió-tī
older brother	賴弟娘哼（luati liannhinn）	tuā-hiann
head	流提（lauthi）	thâu
eye	六味溜之（lakbi liutsi）	ba̍k-tsiu
mouth	疊刺（luitshi）	tshuì
hand	溜鼠（liutshi）	tshiú
leg	啦欺（lakhi）	kha
