= Tapani incident =

1915 uprising in Japanese Taiwan

Tapani Incident
- Part of the Taiwanese resistance to Japanese rule
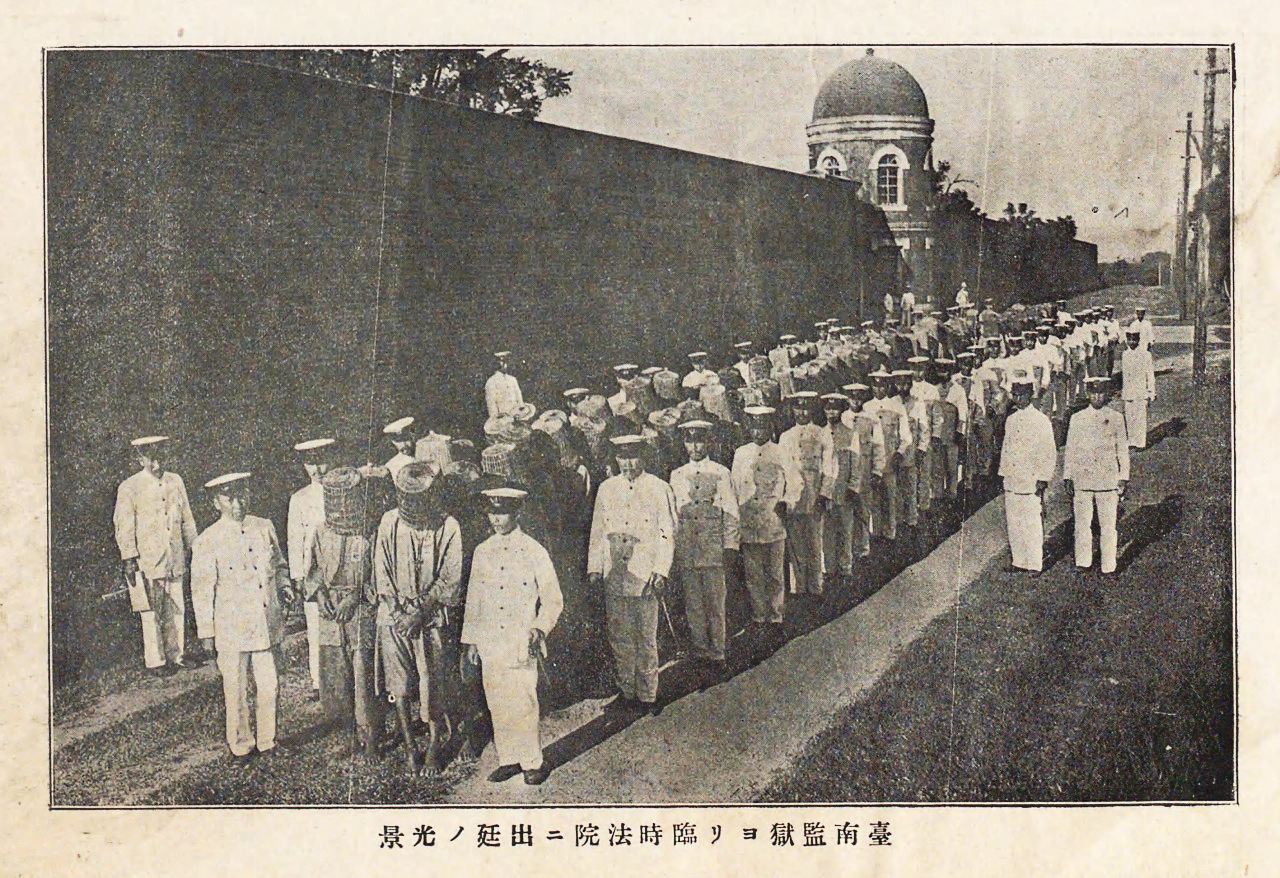
- Taiwanese captured after the Tapani Incident being taken from the Tainan jail to court
Date	6 July 1915 – 18 May 1916 (10 months, 1 week and 5 days)
Location	Tainan, Tainan District, Taiwan
Result	Japanese victory

Belligerents
Ming State of Mercy (Da Ming Cibeiguo); Han Taiwanese; Taivoan	Japan: Taiwan

Commanders and leaders
Yu Qingfang (POW) (executed); Luo Jun (POW) (executed); Jiang Ding (POW) (executed); Su Youzhi (POW) (executed)	Andō Teibi

Units involved
Volunteers	Taiwan Garrison Unit

Strength
1,413	Unknown

Casualties and losses
"Thousands"	Unknown

Tapani incident

Chinese name
- Chinese: 噍吧哖事件
Transcriptions
Standard Mandarin
- Hanyu Pinyin: Jiaòbānián Shìjìan
- Wade–Giles: Chiao^{4}-pa^{1}-nien^{2} Shih^{4}-chien^{4}
Southern Min
- Hokkien POJ: Ta-pa-nî sū-kiāⁿ

Alternative name
- Traditional Chinese: 西來庵事件
- Simplified Chinese: 西来庵事件
- Literal meaning: Xilai Temple Incident
Transcriptions
Standard Mandarin
- Hanyu Pinyin: Xīlaí'ān Shìjìan
- Wade–Giles: Hsi^{1}-lai^{2}-an^{1} Shih^{4}-chien^{4}

Alternative name
- Chinese: 玉井事件
- Literal meaning: Yujing Incident
Transcriptions
Standard Mandarin
- Hanyu Pinyin: Yùjǐng Shìjìan
- Wade–Giles: Yü^{4}-ching^{3} Shih^{4}-chien^{4}

Japanese name
- Kanji: 西来庵事件
- Hiragana: せいらいあんじけん
- Kyūjitai: 西來庵事件
Transcriptions
- Romanization: Seirai-an jiken

The Tapani incident or Tapani uprising in 1915 was one of the biggest armed uprisings by Taiwanese Han and Indigenous people, including Taivoan, against Japanese rule in Taiwan. Alternative names used to refer to the incident include the Xilai Temple Incident after the Xilai Temple in Tainan, where the revolt began, and the Yu Qingfang Incident after the leader Yu Qingfang. Multiple Japanese police stations were stormed by Indigenous and Han Chinese fighters under Jiang Ding and Yu Qingfang.

== Recruitment ==
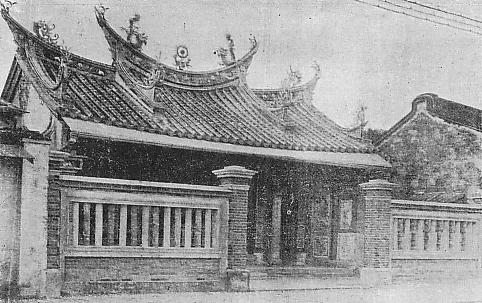
Xilai Temple, Tainan: The site where Yu Qingfang propagated his anti-Japanese movement; originally located on Ting-a-ka Street (now near No. 121, Qingnian Road)

The largest group of participants came from the local ho and kō heads (gentry) from the mountainous areas of Tainan and Akou prefectures, followed by numerous camphor industry workers of the Nantou prefecture. There were also a group of scholars and ex-officials from Tainan city. Only one recruit from the northern and central areas of Taiwan participated in fighting.The revolt recruited supporters from mainland China as well, although the overall worldviews of the revolt participants seem to be largely unaware of or unaffected by recent Chinese political events such as the Xinhai Revolution, but sought to create an imperial state with either Yu or Luo as emperor. The participants of the revolt believed that a force of "celestial troops," or troops from mainland China, would come to their aid, although they disagreed on whether these were to be from Chinese leader Yuan Shikai or from the already-defunct Qing dynasty, and also did not agree on whether the purpose was for China to take over Taiwan or to acquire state independence. During the height of the rebellion, Yu published an edict, reminiscent of ancient imperial Chinese legitimation ideology, based on the ideas of Zhonghua leadership over other nations, the Mandate of Heaven, and dynastic revolution. In the edict he declared the formation of a Da Ming Cibeiguo (Kingdom of Compassion and Great Luminosity). This rhetoric closely resembled those of triad or Heaven and Earth Society rebellions.

== Rebellion ==
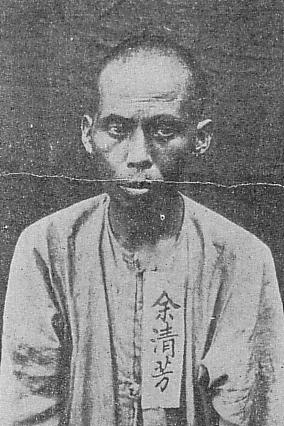
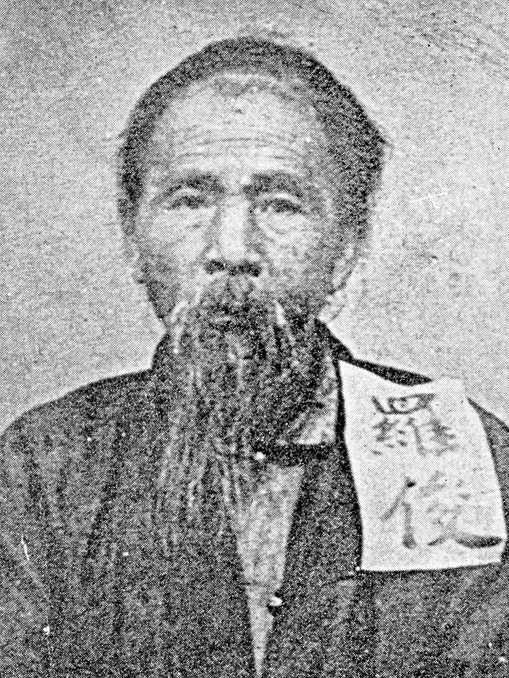
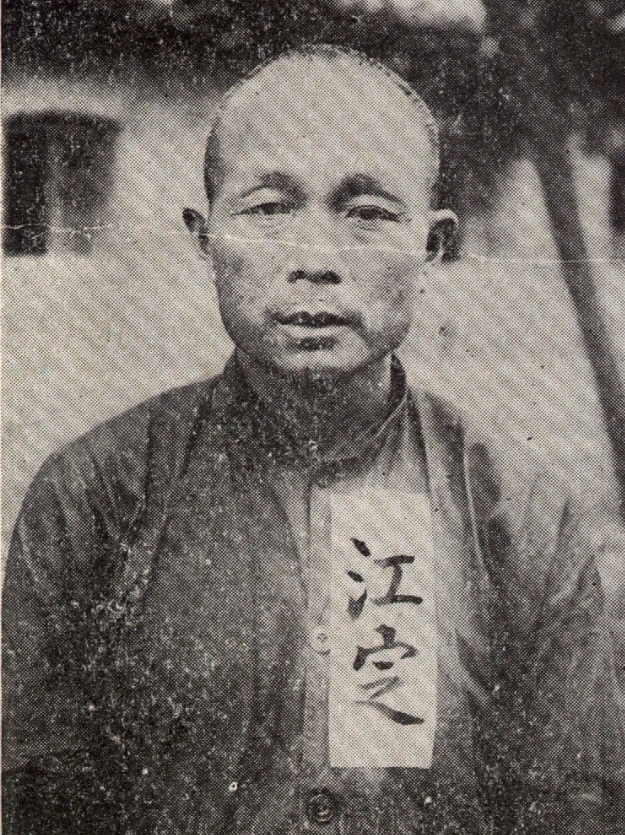
Yu Qingfang (left), Luo Jun (middle) and Jiang Ding (right)

In August, Yu Qingfang and Jiang Ding launched surprise attacks on several police stations. They first had people pretend to be postmen delivering mail. As soon as the officers opened the doors, they rushed in and massacred them. However, they encountered difficulties at the Nanzhuang Police Station. The officers were alert and refused to be tricked into opening the door. Yu Qingfang looted nearby homes, obtained kerosene and other fuels, and then burned the Nanzhuang Police Station. He then attacked and killed numerous Japanese police officers, including their families, and advanced on Damujiang (present-day Xinhua District, Tainan).

On August 22, 1915, Yu Qingfang was at Wanglai Village (present-day Nanxi District, Tainan). Locals hosted a banquet for him. However, amidst the alcoholic fervor, they tied him up and handed him over to the Japanese army.

It wasn't until April of the following year (1916) that Jiang Ding was persuaded to surrender by the Government-General of Taiwan. The government sent agents to Jiang Ding, promising him no prosecution if he surrendered. Due to a shortage of food and weapons, Jiang Ding and 272 of his men descended the mountain and surrendered to the government. On May 18, after accepting the surrender, the government dispatched a large number of police officers late at night to arrest Jiang Ding and all 272 others.

== Aftermath ==
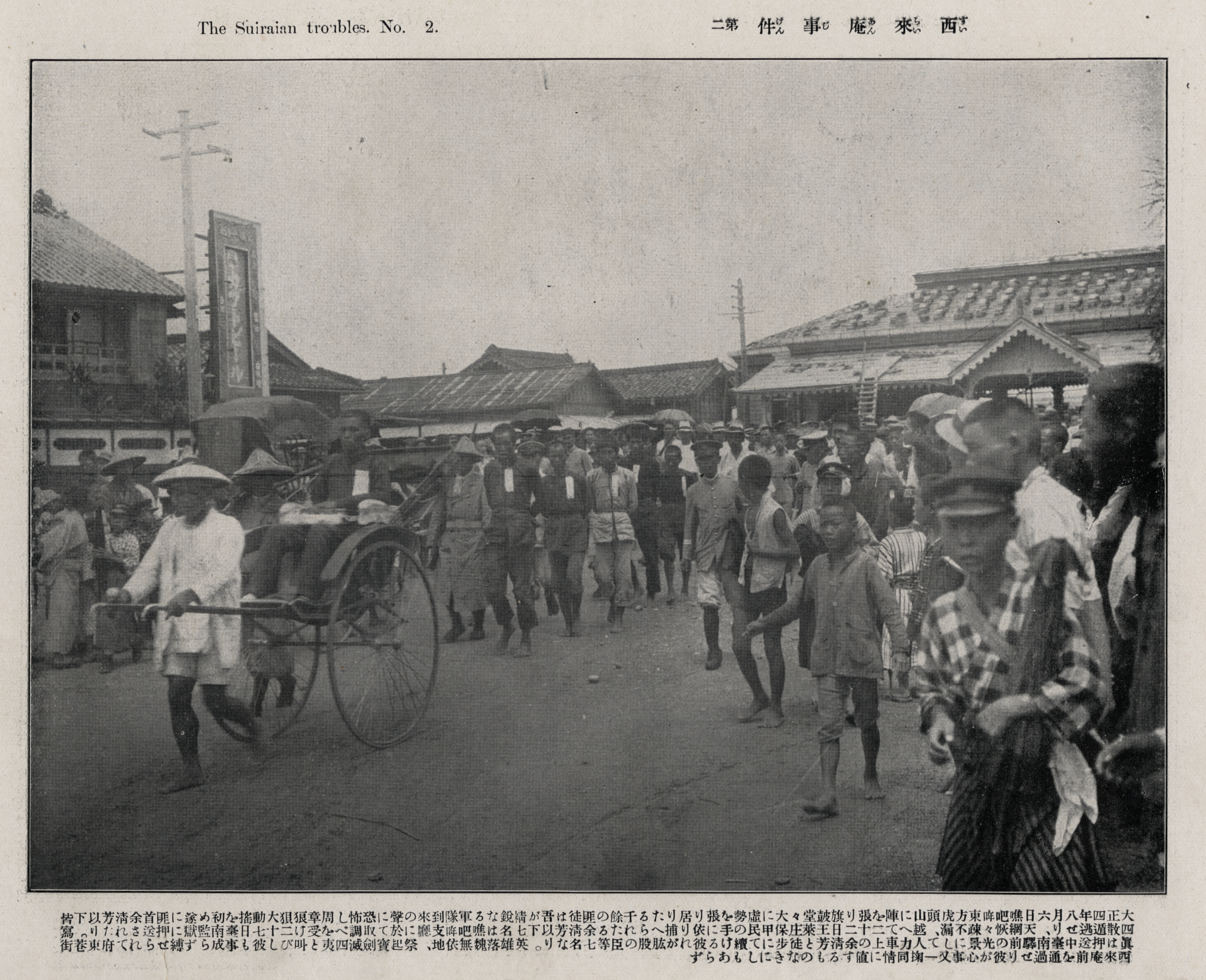
Yu Qingfang and others being escorted under guard past Tainan Station

The Japanese army's subsequent pursuit and campaign resulted in well-documented massacres of Taiwanese who had revolted. According to household registration records and research, starting on August 3rd, 16 people were killed in Nanxi Mizhi Village, and Zhuwei Village was massacred, killing men, women, and children alike, for a total of 251 people. The burning of Shazai Tianzhuang in Yujing resulted in 82 deaths. An unknown number of people were beheaded at the site next to the Wanrendui pile at Yujing Elementary School. 36 people died in Mangzai Mangzhuang, and 119 people were killed in the Neizhuangzizhuang and Mugongzhuang massacres. Dozens of anti-Japanese activists were beheaded and buried in local temples. 114 and 109 people were killed in Nanzhuang and Jingpuliao Village, respectively. 45 people were beheaded in Beiliao Village, 185 people were killed in Zhutouqi Village, and 69 people were massacred in Gangzai Linzhuang. Niupu village was destroyed, and the Sisheliao area of Jiaxianpu was the area where the rebel army was pursued and disbanded, with many remains scattered everywhere. There were killing areas in Aliguan, Xiangzikeng Pingding and other places. In addition, the four killing areas in Xinhua should be the places where more than 200 residents of Zuojhen, Nanhua and Yujing were killed.

== Legacy ==
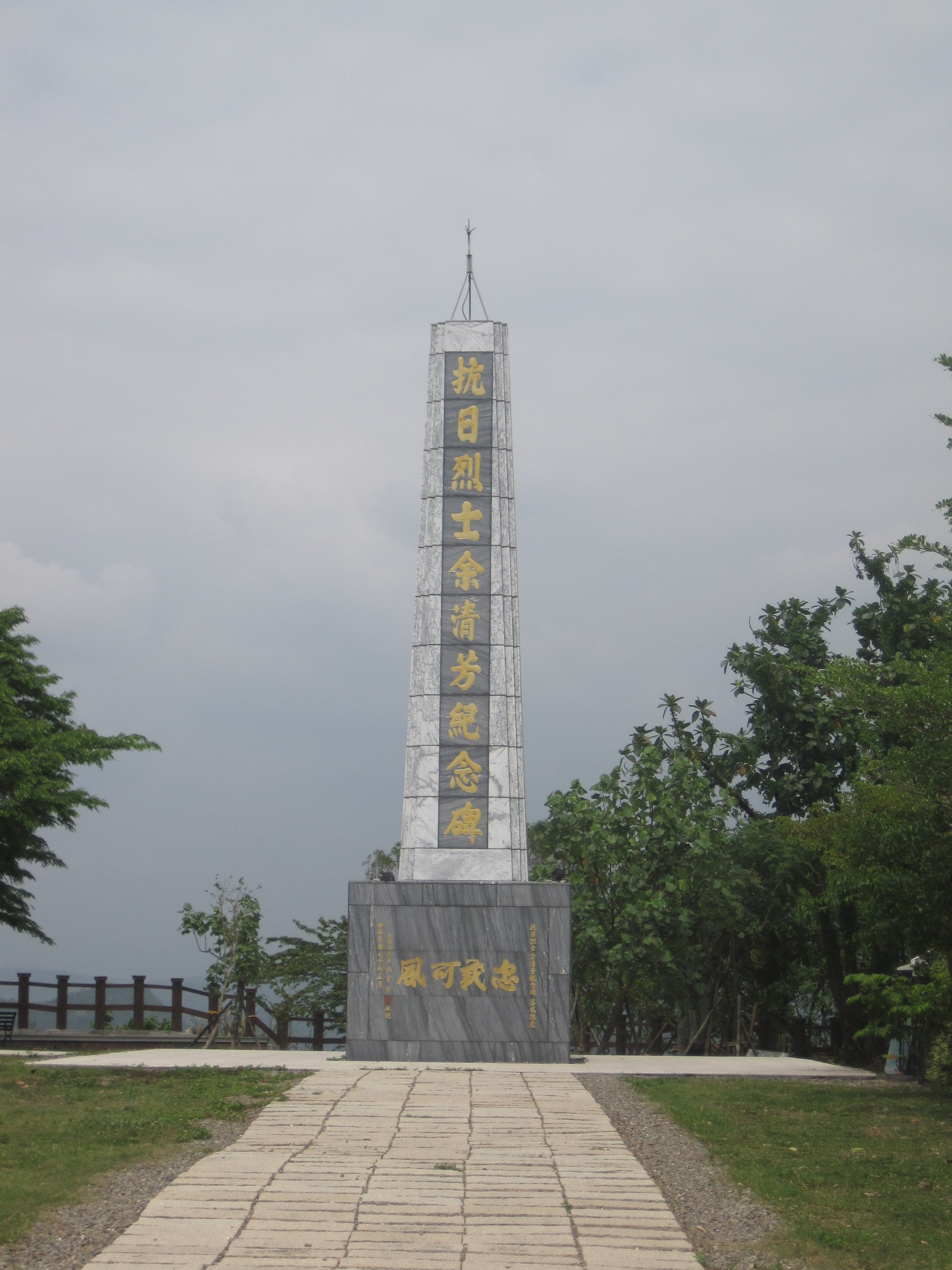
Yu Qingfang Memorial at Hutou Mountain, Yujing District, Tainan

Modern Taiwanese historiography attempts to portray the Tapani Incident as a nationalist uprising either from a Chinese (unification) or Taiwanese (independence) perspective. Japanese colonial historiography attempted to portray the incident as a large-scale instance of banditry led by criminal elements. However, the Tapani Incident differs from other uprisings in Taiwan's history because of its elements of millenarianism and folk religion, which enabled Yu Qingfang to raise a significant armed force whose members believed themselves to be invulnerable to modern weaponry.

The similarities between the rhetoric of the leaders of the Tapani uprising and the Righteous Harmony Society of the recent Boxer Rebellion in China were not lost on Japanese colonial authorities, and the colonial government subsequently paid more attention to popular religion and took steps to improve colonial administration in southern Taiwan.

The Indigenous people carried on with violent armed struggle against the Japanese while Han Chinese violent opposition stopped after Tapani.

== See also ==
- Taiwanese resistance to Japanese colonialism
