= Hung T'ieh-t'ao =

Taiwanese writer

Hung T'ieh-t'ao (Chinese: 洪鐵濤; Pe̍h-ōe-jī: Âng Thih-tô; 1892-1947) was a Taiwanese writer during the Japanese rule. Born in Tainan, he was a member of the Nan Poetry Society and the Chunying Poetry Society (春鶯社). With literary figures from Tainan, he co-founded and served as one of the editors of the 369 Newspaper (三六九小報) for the preservation of Chinese literature with literary figures from Tainan. He was also known as Kunyi (坤益) and by various names such as Ling-ti (舲笛), Chun-i (君憶), Hung-huang (洪荒), Tao-shui (刀水), Hei-chao (黑潮), Hua chan-an (花禪盦), Master of the Wild Fox Chamber (野狐禪室主), and Mr. Razor (剃刀先生).

From a young age, Hung T'ieh-t'ao studied Chinese poetry with local literati in Tainan and then participated in many classical Chinese poetry societies. Hung was particularly skilled in chanting bowl (a type of poetry recitation) and won first place in poetry contests several times. He excelled in object-descriptive poetry, but his poems lacked concern and criticism for social and national issues. He was also skilled in calligraphy, learning the style of Chinese calligrapher Yen Chenching, and left inscriptions on many temple tablets and couplets in Tainan. Hung T'ieh-t'ao's poems were published in newspapers and magazines during the Japanese rule, and were collected in Volume 55 of Complete Taiwanese Poems (全臺詩) (2018). His articles were collected in The Collected Works of Hung T'ieh-t'ao (洪鐵濤文集) (2017) and his novels in The Novels of Hung T'ieh-t'ao (洪鐵濤小說集) (2018).

In addition to poetry, Hung T'ieh-t'ao also wrote short stories and essays. His novel New Journey to the West: A Supplement (新西遊記補), which imitates the classic novel Journey to the West, is set against the backdrop of modern Taiwanese life in the 1930s and follows the adventures of the protagonist. His novels and essays contain a wealth of idioms and colloquial expressions, and the dialogues often use Taiwanese dialect, making them stories full of Taiwanese flavor.
