= Wu Tzu-yü =

Wu Tzu-yü (Chinese: 吳子瑜; Taiwanese: Ngôo Tsú-jû, July 14, 1885 – May 15, 1951), also known as Wu Tung-pi (吳東碧), courtesy name Shao-hou (少侯), and pseudonym Hsiao-lu (小魯), was a literatus and poet during the Japanese rule period. He was born in Lanhsingpao, Changhua County (now Taiping District, Taichung City).

In 1913, Wu Tzu-yü went to Peking (now Beijing) and Shanghai, China, to engage in mining businesses and interacted with political figures while there. He joined the Kuomintang (KMT) and remained in China until 1922 when he returned to Taiwan due to his father Wu Luan-chi's severe illness. His experiences in China influenced his support for the Taiwan Parliament Establishment Petition Movement and other Taiwanese nationalist activities. Even after returning to Taiwan, he continued to engage in political, economic, and cultural anti-Japanese activities in secret.

== Activities ==
In 1936, Wu invested in the construction of the Tengaiten Theater (天外天劇場) near the Taichung railway station. This was the largest privately-operated European-style theater in Taiwan at the time, and it was the second modern theater built by Taiwanese investors after the Lowutai Theater (樂舞台). It underwent several renovations over the years and was ultimately demolished in February 2021.

Wu Tzu-yü had a profound interest in sinology and was known for composing classical Chinese language and culture. In 1926, he joined classical poetry societies such as the Oak Poetry Society. He often hosted gatherings for society members in his villa and courtyard. His works are collected in Sinuous Waters Retaining the Elegance of Literary Style and Stories to Commend — Selection of Historical Materials of Poems and Writings by Wu Luan-chi, Wu Tzu-yü, and Wu Yan-sheng (曲水遺風韻事賡—吳鸞旂、吳子瑜、吳燕生詩文史料選集), edited by Shih I-lin and Yu Mei-ling.
