= Hokkien kinship =

Hokkien kinship system (simplified Chinese: 亲情; traditional Chinese: 親情; Pe̍h-ōe-jī: chhin-chiâⁿ) is the kinship system for Hokkien users.

== Overview ==
Hokkien distinguishes between formal and informal terms for kinship. Subjects are distinguished between, for example, a speaker's nephew and the nephew of the speaker's spouse, although this is affected by age, where a younger relative will often be referred to by their name, rather than a kinship term.

== Common Hokkien family and terminology ==
=== Members of the nuclear family ===
Primary Members
Relation	Term		Vocative		English equivalent
Relation	Hàn-jī	Pe̍h-ōe-jī	Hàn-jī	Pe̍h-ōe-jī	English equivalent
father	父 爸	hū pē, pa, pâ, pah	阿爸 爸爸	a-pah pah-pah	father
mother	母 媽	bú, bó mah	阿母 媽媽	a-bú, a-bó má-mah	mother
elder brother	兄	hiaⁿ	阿兄	a-hiaⁿ	brother
elder sister	姊	ché, chí	阿姊	a-ché, a-chí	sister
younger brother	弟	tī	小弟	sió-tī	brother
younger sister	妹	mōe, bē	小妹	sió-mōe, sió-bē	sister
wife	某	bó͘	家後 牽手	ke-āu khan-chhiú	wife
husband	翁	ang	翁 頭家	ang thâu-ke	husband
son	囝	kiáⁿ	後生 囝	hāu-seⁿ, hāu-siⁿ kiáⁿ	son
daughter	查某囝	cha-bó͘-kiáⁿ	查某囝	cha-bó͘-kiáⁿ	daughter
