= Poets of the Island Reciting Convention =

Poetry convention in Taiwan

The Poets of the Island Reciting Convention (Chinese: 全島詩人聯吟大會) was a significant gathering that brought together poets and poetry societies in Taiwan. This convention took place annually from 1924 to 1937 and was also referred to as the Poetry Societies of the Island (Reciting) Convention, the Han Poets of the Island Convention, the Taiwan Poetic Community Convention, and the Chi-po of the Island Reciting Convention, its name varying each year.

Due to the large number of participants from all walks of life, related media publications were often associated with the activities of poetry societies, resulting in literary socialization and the popularization of literature. The Poets of the Island Reciting Convention did not become regular until 1924, and its cessation occurred because of the aggressive promotion of Japanization (Kominka movement) in 1937.

== Influence ==
During their development from the 17th to the 19th centuries, the majority of Taiwanese poetry societies were primarily gatherings of literati for socializing and composing. In 1895, Taiwan was ceded to Japan after the First Sino-Japanese War, and poetry societies ceased to gather for some time. However, after Japan took over Taiwan in November 1895, the gatherings resumed, and Japanese officials began to participate in them.

In 1921, Governor-General Den Kenjiro hosted the Taiwan Poetry Society Chi-po Reciting Convention, thereby increasing the number of poets and poetry societies and assisting in the formal establishment of the Taiwan Poets Convention in 1924. As a result of Japanese envolvement, poetry organizations became an instrument for the Japanese colonial government in Taiwan to win over local literati in order to rapidly stabilize the locals.

With the advent of the convention, a multitude of poetry-related activities and events of varying scales arose, and trivial everyday matters such as weddings, funerals, and celebrations were performed through recitation. In addition to gentry, literati, officials, and pupils, people from various social strata joined poetry societies, leading to a proliferation of poets in Taiwan.

== See also ==
- Nan Poetry Society
- Oak Poetry Society
