= Lin Tsu-chin =

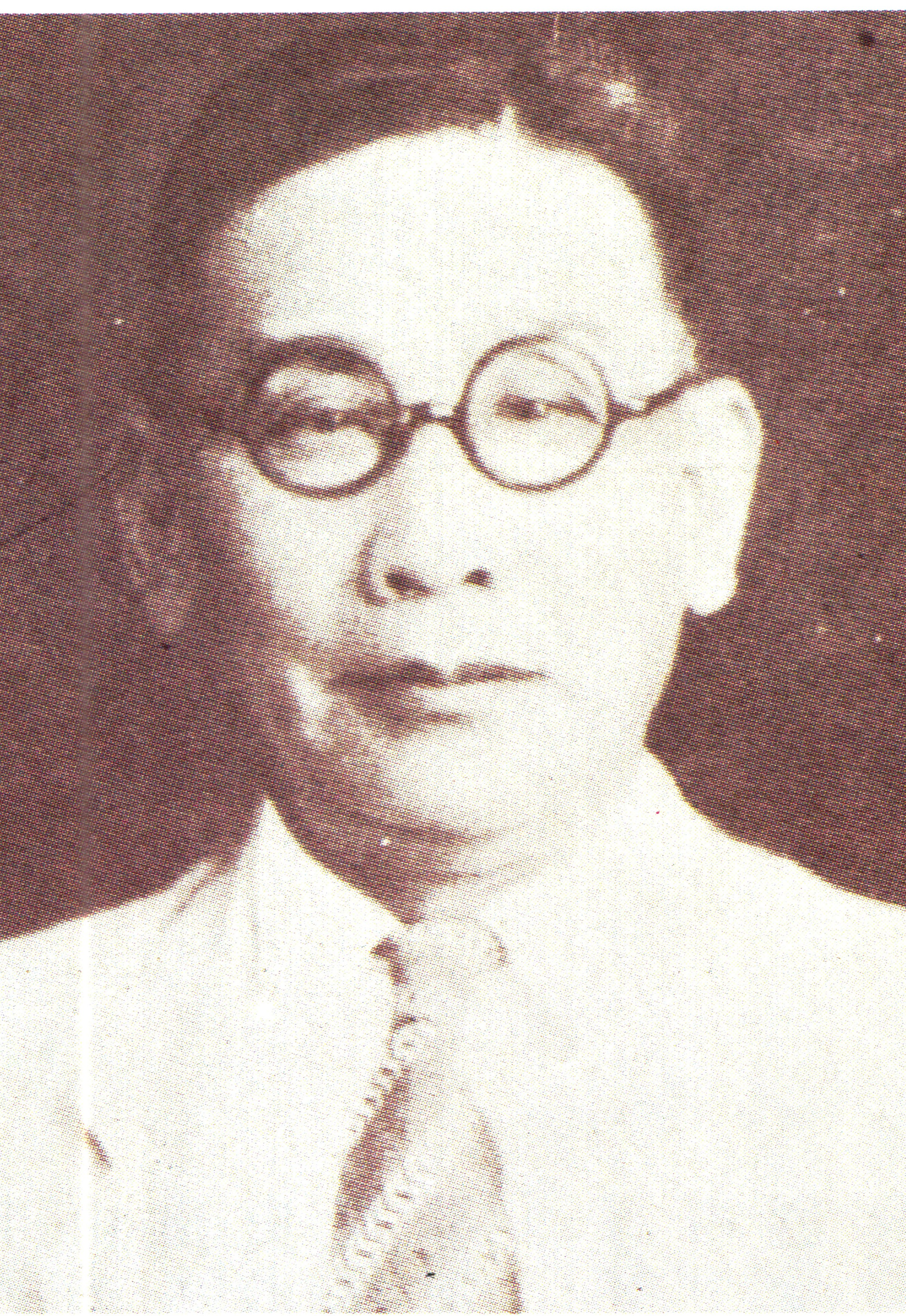
Portrait of Lin Tsu-chin.

Lin Tsu-chin (Chinese: 林子瑾; 1878-1956), courtesy name Shao-ying (少英), pseudonym Ta-chih (大智), also named Lin-ying (林鷹), Lin-pi (林疋), and Lin-ho (林壑), was a prominent figure in early 20th-century Taiwan and China. Hailing from Taichung, Taiwan, he made significant contributions in various fields such as literature, society, and business. With a profound background in Chinese studies, he played a central role in classical poetry societies like Oak Poetry Society and translated Western academic discourses due to his innovative thinking. In 1911, Lin Tsu-chin joined the classical poetry society in Taiwan, Oak Poetry Society, and later founded other classical poetry societies like Shu Society (樗社). In 1919, he co-founded the Taiwan Literary Society with colleagues from Oak Poetry Society and initiated Taiwan's first Chinese literary magazine, Taiwan Literary Arts Magazine.

Actively involved in public affairs, Lin Tsu-chin served as the chairman of the assembly and later a council member when the Taiwanese Cultural Association, a significant political organization during the Japanese rule period, was established in 1921. Additionally, he traveled to Tokyo to participate in the Taiwan Parliament Establishment Petition Movement, advocating for autonomous parliamentary operations. In the latter part of his life, he settled in Peking (now Beijing) and did not return to Taiwan, concluding his development in Taiwan. His literary works include Poetry Collection of Chin Garden.

The garden he constructed, Chin Garden (瑾園), served as a hub for activities of Oak Poetry Society and the Taiwan Literary Society, making it an important gathering place for intellectuals in Taichung. It is currently listed as a historic building in Taichung City, Taiwan.

Due to his extensive experience living in China, Lin Tsu-chin interacted with fellow Taiwanese in Peking and political figures from the early years of the Republic of China. His experiences contribute significantly to the exploration of the Chinese experiences of modern Taiwanese people, holding valuable research significance, whose poetry and literary works carry multiple layers of historical significance and personal characteristics besides their unique life journey.
