= Ying Poetry Society =

Ying Poetry Society (Chinese: 瀛社) is a traditional poetry society in Taiwan, founded in 1909. It was active in Taipei, Taiwan, known as one of the three major poetry societies during the Japanese rule with Nan Poetry Society in Tainan and Oak Poetry Society in Taichung. In 2005, it was officially registered and renamed the Taiwan Ying Poetry Society (臺灣瀛社詩學會).

Ying Poetry Society was founded in 1909 by a group of about 150 classical Chinese poets from northern Taiwan, led by reporters from the Chinese-language department of the Taiwan Daily Newspaper (臺灣日日新報), including Hsieh Ju-chuan (謝汝銓). The founding ceremony was held at the Ping Le Yu restaurant (平樂遊酒樓) in Wanhua, Taipei. After its establishment, the society organized monthly poetic gatherings, annual conferences, and collaborated with other regional poetry societies for joint poetic events, known as the chanting bowl gatherings.

In addition to Taiwanese poets, literary figures from Fuchien, China, and Japanese literati living in Taiwan also joined the society. In 1921, the Ying Poetry Society held the first island-wide poetry conference at the Chun Feng Te I Pavilion (春風得意樓) in Taipei. They held regular meetings once a month, choosing hosts according to the themes. At first, the meetings were closed for internal discussions among the members. Later, under the influence of the chanting bowl gatherings held by the Central Department (a subdivision of the society), the monthly meetings adopted both the themes and the format of the chanting bowl gatherings and opened to non-members.

Ying Poetry Society is inclusive, like a united poetry society. In addition to founding members, it also accepts other poetry societies to participate as a whole. Since 1924, poetry societies from northern Taiwan have recommended members to join the Ying Poetry Society. Some joined as whole societies, others on an individual basis. Ying Poetry Society became a joint club for poetry societies in northern Taiwan. After 1949, Chinese officials and literati began to participate in activities related to classical Taiwanese poetry.

In November 2007, the National Museum of Taiwan Literature commissioned the Graduate Institute of Taiwan Literature at National Taiwan University to organize the Ying Poetry Society Centennial Academic Symposium. In the same year, the Taipei City Archives Committee planned a Ying Poetry Society Centennial Special Exhibition.
