= Koa-á-chheh =

Taiwanese vernacular literature

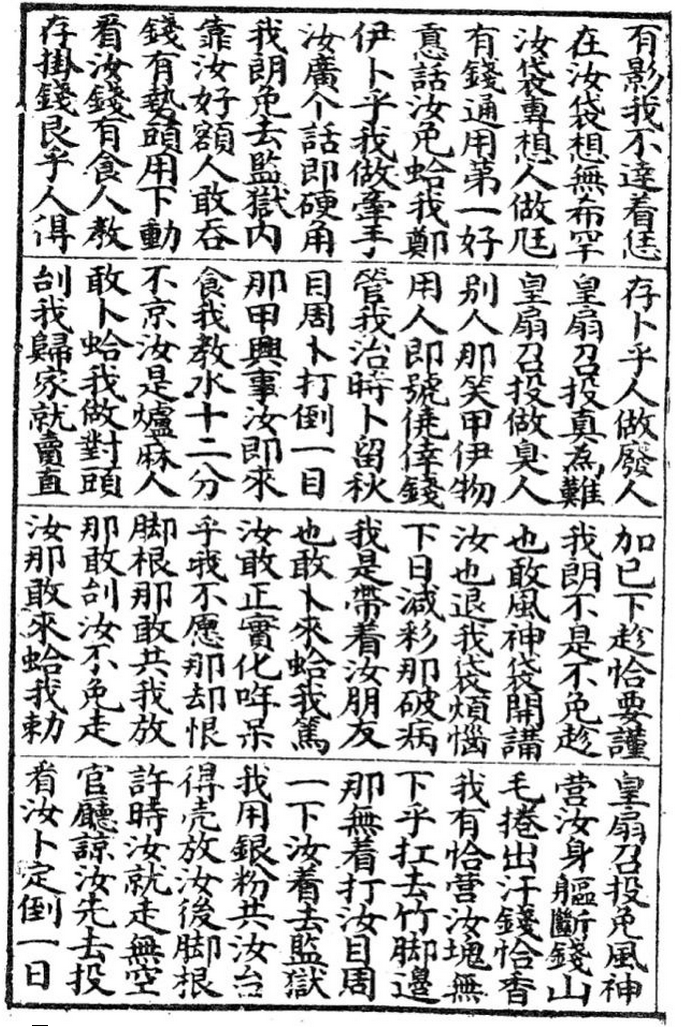
Koa-á book

Koa-á-chheh (Min Nan Chinese: 歌仔冊, lit. 'song book') is a form of vernacular literature of Hokkien language written in Chinese characters, and it is popular in the Taiwanese and Chinese societies where Hoklo people live.

== See also ==
- Broadside ballad
