= Dictionary of Frequently-Used Taiwanese Taigi =

Dictionary of Taiwanese Hokkien

- Language: Taigi including Written Hokkien (definitions in Taiwanese Mandarin) using the Taiwanese Romanization System
- Genre: Dictionary
- Publisher: Ministry of Education (Taiwan)
- Publication date: 2008 (beta); 7 July 2011 (first release)
- Publication place: Taiwan (Republic of China)
- Website: sutian.moe.edu.tw

The Dictionary of Frequently-Used Taiwanese Taigi (Chinese: 臺灣台語常用詞辭典; Tâi-lô: Tâi-uân Tâi-gí Siông-iōng-sû Sû-tián) is a dictionary of Taiwanese Hokkien (also known as Taigi, including Written Hokkien) commissioned by the Ministry of Education of Taiwan. By 2023, the dictionary included 25,000 entries, which includes 3,000 monosyllabic characters and 2,000 appendix entries, and more than 4,000 words common to Hokkien and Mandarin Chinese.

In September 2000, initial plans to commission the dictionary were put forth by the National Languages Committee of the Ministry of Education. In July 2001, the Dictionary of Frequently-Used Taiwan Minnan Editorial Committee (Chinese: 臺灣閩南語常用詞辭典編輯小組; Tâi-lô: Tâi-uân Bân-lâm-gí Siông-iōng Sû-sî-tián Phian-tsip Sió-tsoo) was established.

In October 2008, a beta version of the dictionary was released. On 7 July 2011, the first approved edition of the dictionary was released.

The dictionary is continuously updated by the Editorial Committee, and these updates are financially supported by the Ministry. On 1 June 2020, Flash was retired in favor of HTML audio for the audio samples. On 13 June 2023, a revision of the website was released, featuring enhanced web accessibility, a redesigned bilingual (Taigi and Mandarin) user interface, the addition of voice input queries, and a new domain name.

== See also ==
- Taiwanese Southern Min Recommended Characters
