= Taiwan Taigi Recommended Characters =

Set of three lists of Taiwanese Hokkien characters

- Traditional Chinese: 臺灣台語推薦用字
Transcriptions
Southern Min
- Hokkien POJ: Tâi-ôan Tâi-gí Thui-chiàn Iōng-jī
- Tâi-lô: Tâi-uân Tâi-gí Thui-tsiàn Iōng-jī

Taiwan Taigi Recommended Characters, previously Taiwanese Southern Min Recommended Characters, is a set of three lists of Taiwanese Hokkien characters, numbering 700 in total, which were published by the Taiwan Ministry of Education between 2007 and 2009 recommending which Chinese characters to use when writing Taiwanese Hokkien with Chinese characters. It is currently the only nationally supported standard character set for the Hokkien language in any variety.

== Categories of characters ==
- Root characters (本字): Characters closest in meaning and pronunciation to ancient definitions from rime dictionaries such as Fanqie, for example 山 mountain, 水 water, 天 heaven. Some Taiwanese Hokkien characters are consistent with Old Chinese, for example 箸 ("chopsticks"; 筷子 in Standard Mandarin) and 行 ("walk", 走 in Standard Mandarin).
- Semantic reading characters (訓用字): If the root character is uncertain, then use the Standard Mandarin Vernacular Chinese equivalent that is closest in pronunciation and meaning to the Taiwanese Hokkien morpheme, for example 戇 (gōng), 挖 (óo/ué).
- Phonetic borrowing characters (借音字): If the root character is uncertain and there are no close equivalent morphemes in Standard Mandarin, characters with similar sounds that have gained widespread acceptance in literature can be used, for example 嘛 (mā, "also"), 佳哉 (ka-tsài, "fortunately"), 磅空 (pōng-khang, "tunnel").
- Orthodox characters (傳統習用字): Some morphemes have root characters, however there are also a large number of semantic reading characters or phonetic borrowing characters that are more commonly used, resulting in the root characters becoming obscure and rare. In this case, the more commonly used characters should be used rather than the orthodox characters, for example 你 (lí, "you"; equivalent root character 汝), 人 (lâng, "person"; equivalent root character 儂).
- Combined sound characters (合音字): As a result of a lack of consensus among writers regarding word use, some monosyllable Taiwanese Hokkien morphemes are still written with equivalent polysyllable phrases, for example 落去 (lueh), 佗位 (tueh), 昨昏 (tsa̋ng), 啥人 (siáng). However, some common homophonous characters have become widely adopted over the bisyllabic equivalent, for example 阮 (originally 我人), 莫 (originally 毋愛), 袂 (originally 無會).

== Examples ==
Taiwanese Hokkien character	Tâi-lô reading	English translation	Standard Mandarin equivalent
伊	i	third-person pronoun	他 / 她 / 牠 / 它
予	hōo	give, passive voice marker	給、被
臆	ioh	guess	猜測
耍	sńg	merriment	玩樂
擲	tàn	throw	丟擲
毋	m̄	no, not	不
睏	khùn	sleep	睡覺
媠	suí	beautiful, handsome	美麗的、英俊的
踅	se̍h	spin, orbit	轉動、繞行
捀	phâng	serve with both hands	端(手)
囝	kiánn	son	兒子
覕	bih	hide	躲藏
甌	au	cup	杯子
刣	thâi	slaughter	宰殺
睭	tsiu	eye	眼睛
撨	tshiâu	adjustment	調整
挵	lòng	strike	撞擊
喝	huah	shout, roar	喊、吼
徛	khiā	stand	站立
仝	kâng	identical	相同的
濟	tsē / tsuē	numerous	眾多的
捒	sak	push	推
抾	khioh	pick up	撿拾
囥	khǹg	put	放置
歇	hioh / heh / hennh	rest	休息
足	tsiok	very	非常地
䆀	bái	ugly	醜陋的
泅	siû	swim	游泳
縛	pa̍k	bound	綑綁
攑	gia̍h	hold, lift, carry	拿、舉、抬
沃	ak	pour	澆(水)
蹛	tuà	reside	居住
傱	tsông	run	奔跑
賰	tshun	remainder	剩餘
倩	tshiànn	hire	聘用
搝	giú	pull	拉、扯
啉	lim	drink	飲用
遐	hia	there	那裡

== See also ==
- Dictionary of Frequently-Used Taiwan Minnan
