= Nan Poetry Society =

Taiwanese Han poetry society

The Nan Poetry Society, literally "the Poetry Society of the South", is a Han poetry society in southern Taiwan, whose main members are Tainan literati. Established in Tainan in 1906, the Nan Poetry Society heralded the emergence of poetry in Tainan and contributed to the continuation and preservation of the tradition of Han poetry. The Nan Poetry Society was founded after the Lang-yin Poetry Society, implying "the Poetry Society of Unrestrained Reciting", which was established in 1897. The Lang-yin Poetry Society ceased activities after the death and departure of some members. Accordingly, the remaining members founded Nan Poetry Society in 1906.

The Nan Poetry Society held regular meetings and small gatherings on days other than special festivals. During special festivals, it organized gatherings, chanting bowl, or "Shih-chung" competitions (time-limited poetry writing). The society also participated in poetry recitals throughout Taiwan and in local areas, interacting with the Oak Poetry Society and the Ying Poetry Society. Nan Poetry Society and the latter two societies were the so-called "Major Three Societies".

In October 1914, members of the Nan Poetry Society, along with the members of the Ying Poetry Society, Tao Poetry Society, Chu Poetry Society, and Oak Poetry Society, organized the Han Poets of the Island Convention. In February 1929, the Nan Poetry Society, Tung Lu, Chin Wen, Yu Shan, Liu Ching, and other poetry societies held the Poets of the Island Reciting Convention.

== History ==
After its establishment, Nan Poetry Society elected its first president in 1909. The society had more than 100 members at one point, and most of their works were published in newspapers and magazines during the Japanese rule, such as Tainan-Shinpō, Taiwan Daily Newspaper, Taiwan Shinbun, Shibao (Poetic Newspaper), etc., especially in Tainan-Shinpō. After 1923, due to internal disputes and the fact that the younger members of the society had organized other poetry societies, Nan Poetry Society gradually became inactive. After the outbreak of the Second Sino-Japanese War in 1939, Nan Poetry Society almost ceased its activities entirely, and it officially ended its operation in 1951 when it merged into the Yanping Poetry Society with other poetry societies in Tainan.
