= Taiwanese Hokkien =

Variety of Hokkien spoken in Taiwan

- Taiwanese
- 臺語; Tâi-gí / Tâi-gír / Tâi-gú
- Native to: Taiwan
- Ethnicity: Hoklo Taiwanese
- Speakers: L1: 6.9 million (2020); L2: 12 million (2020); Total: 19 million (2020)
- Language family: Sino-Tibetan: Sinitic; Chinese; Min; Coastal Min; Southern Min; Hokkien; Taiwanese Hokkien
- Early forms: Proto-Sino-Tibetan: Old Chinese (Note: Min is believed to have split from Old Chinese, rather than Middle Chinese like other varieties of Chinese.); Proto-Min
- Writing system: Chinese characters (Traditional), Latin (Tâi-lô, Pe̍h-ōe-jī), Kana, Bopomofo (Taiwanese Phonetic Symbols), Hangul

Official status
- Official language in: Republic of China (Note: National language in Taiwan; also statutory status in Taiwan as one of the languages for public transport announcements and for the naturalization test.)
- Regulated by: Ministry of Education in Taiwan

Language codes
- ISO 639-3: nan as the additional names (Taiwanese and Taigi) for the code
- Glottolog: taib1242 Taibei Hokkien
- Linguasphere: 79-AAA-jh
- IETF: nan-TW
- Proportion of residents aged 6 or older using Hokkien at home in Taiwan, Penghu, Kinmen & Matsu in 2010

Taiwanese Southern Min
- Traditional Chinese: 臺灣閩南語
- Tâi-lô: Tâi-uân Bân-lâm-gí / Bân-lâm-gír / Bân-lâm-gú
Transcriptions
Standard Mandarin
- Hanyu Pinyin: Táiwān Mǐnnányǔ
Southern Min
- Hokkien POJ: Tâi-oân Bân-lâm-gí / Bân-lâm-gír / Bân-lâm-gú
- Tâi-lô: Tâi-uân Bân-lâm-gí / Bân-lâm-gír / Bân-lâm-gú

Taiwanese speech
- Traditional Chinese: 臺灣話
- Tâi-lô: Tâi-uân-uē / Tâi-uân-uā
Transcriptions
Standard Mandarin
- Hanyu Pinyin: Táiwānhuà
- Bopomofo: ㄊㄞˊ ㄨㄢ ㄏㄨㄚˋ
- Wade–Giles: T'ai^{2}-wan^{1}-hua^{4}
- Tongyong Pinyin: Táiwanhuà
- IPA: [tʰǎɪ.wán.xwâ]
Wu
- Romanization: The-uae-ho
Yue: Cantonese
- Yale Romanization: Tòih wāan wá
- Jyutping: Toi4 waan1 waa2
- IPA: [tʰɔj˩ wan˥ wa˧˥]
Southern Min
- Hokkien POJ: Tâi-oân-ōe / Tâi-oân-ōa
- Tâi-lô: Tâi-uân-uē / Tâi-uân-uā

Taiwanese language
- Traditional Chinese: 臺語
- Tâi-lô: Tâi-gí / Tâi-gír / Tâi-gú
Transcriptions
Standard Mandarin
- Hanyu Pinyin: Táiyǔ
- Bopomofo: ㄊㄞˊ ㄩˇ
- Wade–Giles: T'ai^{2}-yü^{3}
- Tongyong Pinyin: Tái-yǔ
- IPA: [tʰǎɪ.ỳ]
Wu
- Romanization: The-nyy
Yue: Cantonese
- Yale Romanization: Tòih yúh
- Jyutping: Toi4 jyu5
- IPA: [tʰɔj˩ jy˩˧]
Southern Min
- Hokkien POJ: Tâi-gí / Tâi-gír / Tâi-gú
- Tâi-lô: Tâi-gí / Tâi-gír / Tâi-gú

Taiwanese Hokkien
- Traditional Chinese: 臺灣福建話
- Tâi-lô: Tâi-uân Hok-kiàn-uē / Hok-kiàn-uā
Transcriptions
Southern Min
- Hokkien POJ: Tâi-oân Hok-kiàn-ōe / Hok-kiàn-ōa
- Tâi-lô: Tâi-uân Hok-kiàn-uē / Hok-kiàn-uā

Taiwan Taigi
- Traditional Chinese: 臺灣台語
- Tâi-lô: Tâi-uân Tâi-gí / Tâi-uân Tâi-gú / Tâi-uân Tâi-gír
Transcriptions
Southern Min
- Hokkien POJ: Tâi-oân Tâi-gí / Tâi-oân Tâi-gú / Tâi-oân Tâi-gír
- Tâi-lô: Tâi-uân Tâi-gí / Tâi-uân Tâi-gú / Tâi-uân Tâi-gír

Taiwanese Hokkien (/ˈhɒkiɛn/ HOK-ee-en, US also /ˈhoʊkiɛn/ HOH-kee-en) or Taiwanese (Chinese: 臺灣話; Tâi-lô: Tâi-uân-ūe), also called Taigi (臺語; Tâi-gí/gú/gír), Taiwanese Taigi (臺灣台語; Tâi-uân Tâi-gí/gú/gír), Taiwanese Southern Min (臺灣閩南語; Tâi-uân Bân-lâm-gí/gú/gír), Hoklo and Holo, is a variety of the Hokkien language spoken natively by more than 70 percent of the population of Taiwan. It is spoken by a significant portion of those Taiwanese people who are descended from Hoklo immigrants of southern Fujian. It is one of the national languages of Taiwan.

Taiwanese Hokkien is generally similar to Hokkien spoken in Xiamen (Amoy), Quanzhou, and Zhangzhou, as well as dialects used in Southeast Asia, such as Singaporean Hokkien, Penang Hokkien, Philippine Hokkien, Medan Hokkien, and Southern Peninsular Malaysian Hokkien. It is mutually intelligible with the Amoy and Zhangzhou varieties at the mouth of the Jiulong River in China, and with Philippine Hokkien to the south in the Philippines, spoken altogether by about 3 million people. The mass popularity of Hokkien entertainment media from Taiwan has given prominence to the Taiwanese variety of Hokkien, especially since the 1980s.

== Classification ==
Taiwanese Hokkien is a variety of Hokkien, a Southern Min language. Like many varieties of Min Chinese, it has distinct literary and colloquial layers of vocabulary, often associated with formal and informal registers respectively. The literary layer can be traced to the late Tang dynasty, and as such is related to Middle Chinese. In contrast, the colloquial layers of Min varieties are believed to have branched from the mainstream of Chinese around the time of the Han dynasty.

Regional variations within the Taiwanese variant may be traced back to Hokkien variants spoken in Southern Fujian, specifically those from Quanzhou and Zhangzhou, and later from Amoy. Taiwanese also contains loanwords from Japanese and native Formosan languages. Recent work by scholars such as Ekki Lu, Toru Sakai, and Li Khin-hoann, based on former research by scholars such as Ong Iok-tek, has gone so far as to associate part of the basic vocabulary of the colloquial Taiwanese with the Austronesian and Tai language families; however, such claims are controversial.

The literary form of Hokkien once flourished in Fujian and was brought to Taiwan by early emigrants. Tale of the Lychee Mirror, a manuscript of a series of plays published during the Ming dynasty in 1566, is one of the earliest known works. This form of language is now largely extinct. However, literary readings of the numbers are used in certain contexts, such as reciting telephone numbers (see Literary and colloquial readings of Chinese characters).

== History and formation ==
=== Spread of Hokkien to Taiwan ===
During the Yuan dynasty, Quanzhou became a major international port for trade with the outside world. From that period onwards, many people from the Hokkien-speaking regions (southern Fujian) started to emigrate overseas due to political and economic reasons. One of the destinations for the emigrants was the island of Taiwan (formerly Formosa), starting around 1600. They brought their native Hokkien language with them.

During the late Ming dynasty, the political chaos pushed more migrants from southern Fujian and eastern Guangdong to Taiwan. The earliest immigrants involved in Taiwan's development included pirate-merchants Pedro Yan Shiqi and Zheng Zhilong. In 1621, Chinese Peter and his forces, hailing from Zhangzhou, occupied Ponkan (modern-day Beigang, Yunlin) and started to develop Tirosen (modern-day Chiayi). After the death of Peter and another pirate, Li Dan of Quanzhou, Zheng sought to dominate the Strait of Taiwan. By 1628, he had grown so powerful that the Ming court bestowed him the official title, "Patrolling Admiral".

In 1624, the number of Chinese on the island was about 25,000. During the reign of Chongzhen Emperor (1627–1644), there were frequent droughts in the Fujian region. Zheng and a Chinese official suggested sending victims to Taiwan and provide "for each person three taels of silver and for each three people one ox". Although this plan was never carried out, the Zheng family maintained an interest in Taiwan that would have dire consequences for the Dutch Empire, who ruled Taiwan as Dutch Formosa at the time.

=== Development and divergence ===
In 1624 and 1626, the Dutch and Spanish forces occupied the Tainan and Keelung areas, respectively. During the 40 years of Dutch colonial rule of Taiwan, the Dutch recruited many Chinese from the regions around Quanzhou and Zhangzhou in southern Fujian to help develop Taiwan.

In the 1661 Siege of Fort Zeelandia, Chinese general Koxinga, marshaling a military force composed of fellow hometown hoklo soldiers of Southern Fujian, expelled the Dutch and established the Kingdom of Tungning. Koxinga originated from the Quanzhou region. Chen Yonghua, who was in charge of establishing the education system of Tungning, also originated from Tong'an county of Quanzhou Prefecture. Because most of the soldiers he brought to Taiwan came from Quanzhou, the prestige variant of Hokkien on the island at the time was the Quanzhou dialect.

In 1683, Chinese admiral Shi Lang, marshaling a military force again composed of fellow hometown Hoklo soldiers of Southern Fujian, attacked Taiwan in the Battle of Penghu, ending the Tungning era and beginning Qing dynasty rule (until 1895).

In the first decades of the 18th century, the linguistic differences between the Qing imperial bureaucrats and the commoners were recorded by the Mandarin-speaking first Imperial High Commissioner to Taiwan (1722), Huang Shujing:

In this place, the language is as birdcall – totally unintelligible! For example: for the surname Liú, they say 'Lâu'; for Chén, 'Tân'; Zhuāng, 'Chng'; and Zhāng is 'Tiuⁿ'. My deputy's surname Wú becomes 'Ngô͘'. My surname Huáng does not even have a proper vowel: it is 'N̂g' here! It is difficult to make sense of this.
(郡中鴃舌鳥語，全不可曉。如：劉呼「澇」、陳呼「澹」、莊呼「曾」、張呼「丟」。余與吳待御兩姓，吳呼作「襖」，黃則無音，厄影切，更為難省。)

— Records from the mission to Taiwan and its Strait, Volume II: "On the area around Fort Provintia, Tainan" (臺海使槎錄 卷二 赤嵌筆談)

The tone of Huang's message foretold the uneasy relationships between different language communities and colonial establishments over the next few centuries.

During the 200 years of Qing dynasty rule, thousands of immigrants from Fujian arrived yearly; the population was over one million in the middle of the 18th century. Civil unrest and armed conflicts were frequent. In addition to resistance against governments (both Chinese and later Japanese), battles between ethnic groups were also significant: the belligerents usually grouped around the language they used. History has recorded battles between Hakka speakers and Hokkien speakers, between these and the aborigines, and even between those who spoke different variants of Hokkien.

In the early 20th century, the Hoklo Taiwanese could be categorized as originating from modern-day Xiamen, Quanzhou, Zhangzhou, and Zhangpu. People from the former two areas (Quanzhou-speaking) were dominant in the north of the island and along the west coast, whereas people from the latter two areas (Zhangzhou-speaking) were dominant in the south and perhaps the central plains as well.

Although there were conflicts between Quanzhou and Zhangzhou speakers in Taiwan historically, their gradual intermingling led to the mixture of the two accents. Apart from Lukang city and Yilan County, which have preserved their original Quanzhou and Zhangzhou accents, respectively, almost every region of Taiwan now speaks a mixture of Quanzhou and Zhangzhou Hokkien. A similar phenomenon occurred in Xiamen (Amoy) after 1842, when the mixture of Quanzhou and Zhangzhou Hokkien displaced the Quanzhou dialect to yield the modern Amoy dialect.

During the Imperial Japanese rule of Taiwan, Taiwan began to hold Amoy Hokkien as its standard pronunciation; the Japanese called this mixture Taiwanese (臺灣語, Taiwango).

Due to the influx of Japanese loanwords before 1945 and the political separation after 1949, Amoy Hokkien and Taiwanese Hokkien began to diverge slightly.

=== Modern times ===
Proportion of languages used at home by residents aged 6 or over in Taiwan in 2010, sorted by birth year. The chart shows the tendency that speech communities of Taiwanese local languages are shifting to speak Mandarin.

Later, in the 20th century, the conceptualization of Taiwanese was more controversial than most variations of Chinese because, at one time, it marked a clear division between the mainlanders who arrived in 1949 and the pre-existing majority native Taiwanese. Although the political and linguistic divisions between the two groups have blurred considerably, the political issues surrounding the Taiwanese have been more controversial and sensitive than for other varieties of Chinese.

After the First Sino-Japanese War, due to military defeat to the Japanese, the Qing dynasty ceded Taiwan to Japan, causing contact with the Hokkien-speaking regions of mainland China to stop. During Japanese rule, Japanese became an official language in Taiwan, and Taiwanese began to absorb a large number of Japanese loanwords into its language. Examples of such loanwords (some which had in turn been borrowed from English) include piān-só͘ from benjo (便所; "toilet"), phêng from tsubo (坪; "pyeong", an areal measurement) (see also Taiwanese units of measurement), ga-suh from gasu (瓦斯; "gas"), o͘-tó͘-bái from ōtobai (オートバイ; "autobicycle", motorcycle). All of these caused the Taiwanese to deviate from Hokkien used elsewhere.

During Kōminka of the late Japanese colonial period, the Japanese language appeared in every corner of Taiwan. The Second Sino-Japanese War beginning in 1937 brought stricter measures into force, and along with the outlawing of romanized Taiwanese, various publications were prohibited and Confucian-style private schools which taught Classical Chinese with literary Southern Min pronunciation – was closed down in 1939. Taiwanese thus was reduced to a common daily language. In 1937 the colonial government introduced a concept called "National Language Family" (国語の家), which meant that families that proved that they adopted Japanese as their daily language enjoyed benefits such as greater access to education.

After the handover of Taiwan to the Republic of China in 1945, there was a brief cultural exchange with mainland China followed by further oppression. The Chinese Civil War resulted in another political separation when the Kuomintang (Chinese Nationalist Party) government retreated to Taiwan following their defeat by the communists in 1949. The influx of two million soldiers and civilians caused the population of Taiwan to increase from 6 million to 8 million. As part of its language policy under martial law, the government subsequently promoted Mandarin while suppressing, but short of banning, the use of written Taiwanese Hokkien (e.g. Pe̍h-ōe-jī, a phonetic rendering of spoken Hokkien using the Latin alphabet) as part of its general policy of political repression. In 1964 the use of spoken Taiwanese Hokkien or Hakka in schools or in official settings was forbidden; violations of the prohibition in schools often resulted in physical punishments, fines, or humiliation.

Only after the lifting of martial law in 1987 and the mother tongue movement in the 1990s did Taiwan finally see a true revival in Taiwanese Hokkien. Today, there are a large number of Taiwanese Hokkien scholars dedicated to researching the language. Despite this, however, according to census data, the number of people speaking Taiwanese continued to drop. Taiwanese remains the de facto language of temple ceremonies as part of Taiwanese Folk Beliefs.

The history of the Taiwanese variety of Hokkien and its interaction with Mandarin is complex and, at times, controversial, even regarding its name. The language has no official name in Taiwan. Some dislike the name "Taiwanese" as they feel that it belittles other languages spoken on the island such as Mandarin, Hakka, and the indigenous languages. Others prefer the names Southern Min, Minnan or Hokkien as this views Taiwanese as a form of the Chinese variety spoken in Fujian province in mainland China. Others dislike those names for precisely the same reason. In the American Community Survey run by the United States Census Bureau, Taiwanese was referred to as "Formosan" from 2012 to 2015 and as "Min Nan Chinese" since 2016.

== Phonology ==
Phonologically, Hokkien is a tonal language with extensive tone sandhi rules. Syllables consist maximally of an initial consonant, a vowel, a final consonant, and a tone.

=== Consonants ===
Initials
		Bilabial	Alveolar	Alveolo -palatal	Velar	Glottal
Nasal		[m] m ㄇ	[n] n ㄋ		[ŋ] ng ㄫ	
Stop	voiced	[b] b ㆠ	[d]~[l]~[ɾ] (Note: Allophonically pronounced in some variations spoken in Taiwan.) ㄌ		[ɡ] g ㆣ	
Stop	tenuis	[p] p ㄅ	[t] t ㄉ		[k] k ㄍ	
Stop	aspirated	[pʰ] ph ㄆ	[tʰ] th ㄊ		[kʰ] kh ㄎ	
Affricate	voiced		[dz]~[l] (Note: Many speakers replace [dz] with [l].) j ㆡ	[dʑ]~[l] (Note: Many speakers replace [dʑ] with [l].) j(i) ㆢ		
Affricate	tenuis		[ts] ch, ts ㄗ	[tɕ] ch(i), ts(i) ㄐ		
Affricate	aspirated		[tsʰ] chh, tsh ㄘ	[tɕʰ] chh(i), tsh(i) ㄑ		
Fricative			[s] s ㄙ	[ɕ] si ㄒ		[h] h ㄏ
Liquid			[l]~[ɾ] (Note: Allophonically pronounced in some variations spoken in Taiwan.) ㄌ			

Finals
	Bilabial	Alveolar	Velar	Glottal
Nasal	[m] -m	[n] -n	[ŋ] -ng	[◌̃] -ⁿ, -nn
Plosive	[p̚] -p ㆴ	[t̚] -t ㆵ	[k̚] -k ㆻ	[ʔ] -h ㆷ

Unlike many other varieties of Chinese such as Mandarin, Cantonese, Hakka, etc., there are no native labiodental phonemes (i.e. [f], [v], [ʋ], etc.).

1. Coronal affricates and fricatives become alveolo-palatal before /i/, that is, /dzi/, /tsi/, /tsʰi/, and /si/ are pronounced [dʑi], [tɕi], [tɕʰi], and [ɕi].
2. The consonant /dz/ may be realized as a fricative; that is, as [z] in most environments and [ʑ] before /i/.
3. The voiced plosives (/b/ and /ɡ/) become the corresponding fricatives ([β] and [ɣ]) in some phonetic contexts. This is similar to begadkefat in Hebrew and a similar allophony of intervocalic plosive consonants and their fricatives in Spanish.

=== Vowels ===
Taiwanese has the following vowels:

	Front		Central		Back		Syllabic consonant	
	Oral	Nasal	Oral	Nasal	Oral	Nasal	Syllabic consonant	
Close	[i] i ㄧ	[ĩ] iⁿ, inn ㆪ			[u] u ㄨ	[ũ] uⁿ,unn ㆫ	[m̩] m ㆬ	[ŋ̍] ng ㆭ
Mid	[e] e ㆤ	[ẽ] eⁿ,enn ㆥ	[ɤ] ~ [o] o ㄜ, ㄛ		[ɔ] o͘, oo ㆦ	[ɔ̃] oⁿ, onn ㆧ	[m̩] m ㆬ	[ŋ̍] ng ㆭ
Open			[a] a ㄚ	[ã] aⁿ, ann ㆩ			[m̩] m ㆬ	[ŋ̍] ng ㆭ

The vowel ⟨o⟩ is akin to a schwa; in contrast, ⟨o͘ ⟩ (with dot) or ⟨oo⟩ is a more open vowel. In addition, there are several diphthongs and triphthongs (for example, ⟨iau⟩). The consonants ⟨m⟩ and ⟨ng⟩ can function as a syllabic nucleus and are therefore included here as vowels. The vowels may be either plain or nasal: ⟨a⟩ is non-nasal, and ⟨aⁿ⟩ or ⟨ann⟩ is the same vowel with concurrent nasal articulation. This is similar to French, Portuguese, Polish, and many other languages.

There are two pronunciations of vowel ⟨o⟩. In the south (e.g., Tainan and Kaohsiung) it is [ɤ]; in the north (e.g., Taipei) it is [o]. Due to the development of transportation and communication, both pronunciations are common and acceptable throughout the country.

/i/ is a diphthong [iɪ] before -k or -ng (Pe̍h-ōe-jī: ek, eng; Tâi-lô: ik, ing), and is slightly shortened and retracted before -p or -t to something more like [í̞]. Similarly, /u/ is slightly shortened and retracted before -t or -n to something more like [ʊ].

=== Tones ===
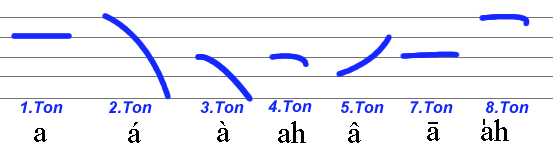
Taiwanese tones, close to Taipei values.

In the traditional analysis, there are eight "tones", numbered from 1 to 8. Strictly speaking, there are only five tonal contours. But as in other Sinitic languages, the two kinds of stopped syllables are also considered to be tones and assigned numbers 4 and 8. Words of tone 6 have merged into either tone 2 or tone 7 in most Taiwanese variants, and thus tone 6 is duplicated in the count. Here the eight tones are shown, following the traditional tone class categorization, named after the tones of Middle Chinese:

Taiwanese tones
Tone number	Name	Tâi-lô / POJ accent	Pitch in Taipei	Description	Pitch in Tainan	Description
1	Yin Level (陰平)	a	/á/ = /a˥/ (55)	High	/á/ = /a˦/ (44)	High
2 (6)	Rising (上聲)	á	/â/ = /a˥˩/ (51)	Falling	/â/ = /a˥˧/ (53)	High Falling
3	Yin Departing (陰去)	à	/à/ = /a˧˩/ to /˨˩/ (21)	Low Falling	/à/ = /a˩/ (11)	Low
4	Yin Entering (陰入)	ah	/āʔ/ = /aʔ˧˨/ (32)	Mid Stopped	/àʔ/ = /aʔ˨˩/ (21)	Low Stopped
5	Yang Level (陽平)	â	/ǎ/= /a˩˦ ~ a˨˦/ (24)	Rising	/ǎ/ = /a˨˦/ (25)	Rising
7	Yang Departing (陽去)	ā	/ā/ = /a˧/ (33)	Mid	/ā/ = /a˨/ (22)	Mid
8	Yang Entering (陽入)	a̍h	/áʔ/ = /aʔ˦/ (4)	High Stopped	/áʔ/ = /aʔ˥/ (5)	High Stopped

Eight tones of Taiwanese
Demonstration of the tones of Taiwanese: sann (衫), té (短), khò (褲), khuah (闊), lâng (人), é (矮), phīnn (鼻), ti̍t (直). Tone sandhi rules do not apply in this sentence. (This demonstration is popular but misleading in the use of é (矮) as an example for tone 6. Despite alternations in its vowel quality, this word belongs in tone 2 in all Southern Min varieties, including those distinguishing tone 6 from other tones.)

See (for one example) the modern phonological analysis in Chiung (2003), which challenges these notions.

For tones 4 and 8, a final consonant ⟨p⟩, ⟨t⟩, or ⟨k⟩ may appear. When this happens, it is impossible for the syllable to be nasal. Indeed, these are the counterpart to the nasal final consonants ⟨m⟩, ⟨n⟩, and ⟨ng⟩, respectively, in other tones. However, it is possible to have a nasal 4th or 8th tone syllable such as ⟨siahⁿ⟩ or ⟨siahnn⟩, as long as there is no final consonant other than ⟨h⟩.

In the dialect spoken near the northern coast of Taiwan, there is no distinction between tones number 8 and number 4 – both are pronounced as if they follow the tone sandhi rules of tone number 4.

Tone number 0, typically written with two consecutive hyphens (--a) or a point (·a) before the syllable with this tone, is used to mark enclitics denoting the extent of a verb action, the end of a noun phrase, etc. A frequent use of this tone is to denote a question, such as in Chia̍h-pá--bōe? or Tsia̍h-pá--būe? (lit. 'Have you eaten yet?'). This is realized by speaking the syllable with either a low-falling tone (3) or a low stop (4). The syllable prior to the ⟨--⟩ maintains its original tone.

==== Ninth tone ====
Although uncommon in written Taiwanese, there is a ninth tone which is used for three main purposes: contractions, triplicated adjectives, and loan words. The writing conventions for this tone vary, but the most common are with a breve accent (U+0306, ⟨◌̆⟩) in POJ and with a double acute accent (U+030B, ⟨◌̋⟩) in Tai-lo.

=== Tone sandhi ===
Schema of the tone sandhi rules in Taiwanese.

Taiwanese has extremely extensive tone sandhi (tone-changing) rules: in an utterance, only the last syllable pronounced is not affected by the rules. What an 'utterance' (or 'intonational phrase') is, in the context of this language, is an ongoing topic for linguistic research, but some general rules apply:

The following syllables are unaffected by tone sandhi:

- The final syllable in a sentence, noun (including single syllable nouns, but not pronouns), number, time phrase (i.e., today, tomorrow, etc.), spatial preposition (i.e., on, under), or question word (i.e., who, what, how).
- The syllable immediately preceding a neutralized tone. In POJ and TL, this is the syllable before a double hyphen, e.g., Ông--sian-siⁿ (王先生) or Ông--sian-sinn.
- Some common aspect markers: liáu (了), hó (好), oân (完) or uân, soah (煞) or suah.

==== Normal tone sandhi ====
The following rules, listed in the traditional pedagogical mnemonic order, govern the pronunciation of tone on each of the syllables affected (that is, all but those described according to the rules listed above):

- If the original tone number is 5, pronounce it as tone number 3 (Quanzhou/Taipei speech) or 7 (Zhangzhou/Tainan speech).
- If the original tone number is 7, pronounce it as tone number 3.
- If the original tone number is 3, pronounce it as tone number 2.
- If the original tone number is 2, pronounce it as tone number 1.
- If the original tone number is 1, pronounce it as tone number 7.
- If the original tone number is 8 and the final consonant is not h (that is, it is p, t, or k), pronounce it as tone number 4.
- If the original tone number is 4 and the final consonant is not h (that is, it is p, t, or k), pronounce it as tone number 8.
- If the original tone number is 8 and the final consonant is h, pronounce it as tone number 3.
- If the original tone number is 4 and the final consonant is h, pronounce it as tone number 2.

An example of the normal tone sandhi rule is:

老老 lāu-lāu: 7 + 7 → 3 + 7
拍拍 phah-phah: 4 + 4 → 2 + 4

Normal tone sandhi (IPA)
Tone number	Sandhi	Taipei	Tainan
5	tang^{5}⁻^{3} / tang^{5}⁻^{7}	[taŋ˨˦꜔꜖]	[taŋ˨˦꜕]
7	tang^{7}⁻^{3}	[taŋ˧꜔꜖]	[taŋ˨꜖]
3	tang^{3}⁻^{2}	[taŋ˧˩꜒꜖]	[taŋ˩꜒꜔]
2	tang^{2}⁻^{1}	[taŋ˥˩꜒]	[taŋ˥˧꜓]
1	tang^{1}⁻^{7}	[taŋ˥꜔]	[taŋ˦꜕]
8	tak^{8}⁻^{4}	[tak˦꜔꜕]	[tak˥꜕꜖]
8	tah^{8}⁻^{3}	[taʔ˦꜔꜖]	[taʔ˥꜖]
4	tak^{4}⁻^{8}	[tak˧˨꜓]	[tak˨˩꜒]
4	tah^{4}⁻^{2}	[taʔ˧˨꜒꜖]	[taʔ˨˩꜒꜔]

==== Double tone sandhi ====
There are a number of a single syllable words that undergo double tone sandhi, that is, they follow the tone change rule twice and are pronounced according to the second tone change. These syllables are almost always a 4th tone ending in -h, and include the words 欲 (beh), 佮 (kah), 閣 (koh), 才 (chiah/tsiah), as well as the 3rd tone verb 去 khì. As a result of following the tone change rule twice, these syllables are all pronounced as tone number 1.

Double tone sandhi (IPA)
Tone number	Sandhi	Taipei	Tainan
4	kah⁴⁻¹	[kaʔ˧˨꜒]	[kaʔ˨˩꜓]
3	khi³⁻¹	[kʰi˧˩꜒]	[kʰi˩꜓]

==== Before the -á suffix ====
Apart from the normal tone sandhi rules described above, there are two special cases where a different set of tone sandhi apply. In a noun with the noun suffix '仔' (á), the penultimate syllable is governed by the following rules:

- If the original tone number is 5, pronounce it as tone number 7.
- If the original tone number is 7, pronounce it as tone number 7.
- If the original tone number is 2 or 3, pronounce it as tone number 1.
- If the original tone number is 1, pronounce it as tone number 7.(same as normal)
- If the original tone number is 8 and final consonant is not h (that is, it is p, t, or k), pronounce it as tone number 4.(same as normal)
- If the original tone number is 4 and final consonant is not h (that is, it is p, t, or k), pronounce it as tone number 8.(same as normal)
- If the original tone number is 8 and final consonant is h, pronounce it as tone number 7.
- If the original tone number is 4 and final consonant is h, pronounce it as tone number 1. (same as double)

Tone sandhi before -á (IPA)
Tone number	Sandhi	Taipei	Tainan
5	tang⁵⁻⁷	[taŋ˨˦꜔]	[taŋ˨˦꜕]
7	tang⁷⁻⁷	[taŋ˧꜔]	[taŋ˨꜕]
3	tang³⁻¹	[taŋ˧˩꜒]	[taŋ˩꜓]
2	tang²⁻¹	[taŋ˥˩꜒]	[taŋ˥˧꜓]
1	tang¹⁻⁷	[taŋ˥꜔]	[taŋ˦꜕]
8	tak⁸⁻⁴	[tak˦꜔꜕]	[tak˥꜕꜖]
8	tah⁸⁻⁷	[taʔ˦꜔]	[taʔ˥꜕]
4	tak⁴⁻⁸	[tak˧˨꜓]	[tak˨˩꜒]
4	tah⁴⁻¹	[taʔ˧˨꜒]	[taʔ˨˩꜓]

==== In triplicated adjectives ====
Finally, in the case of a single-syllable adjective triplication (for added emphasis), the first syllable is governed by the following rules (the second syllable follows the normal tone sandhi rules above):

- If the original tone number is 5, pronounce it as tone number 5.
- If the original tone number is 7, pronounce it as tone number 1.
- If the original tone number is 3, pronounce it as tone number 2 (same as normal).
- If the original tone number is 2, pronounce it as tone number 1 (same as normal).
- If the original tone number is 1, pronounce it as tone number 5.
- If the original tone number is 8 and the final consonant is not h (that is, it is p, t, or k), pronounce it as tone number 4 (same as normal).
- If the original tone number is 4 and the final consonant is not h (that is, it is p, t, or k), pronounce it as tone number 8 (same as normal).
- If the original tone number is 8 and the final consonant is h, pronounce it as tone number 5.
- If the original tone number is 4 and the final consonant is h, pronounce it as tone number 2 (same as normal).

Triplicated tone sandhi (IPA)
Tone number	Sandhi	Taipei	Tainan
5	tang⁵⁻⁵	[taŋ˨˦꜕꜓]	[taŋ˨˦꜕꜓]
7	tang⁷⁻¹	[taŋ˧꜒]	[taŋ˨꜓]
3	tang³⁻²	[taŋ˧˩꜒꜖]	[taŋ˩꜒꜔]
2	tang²⁻¹	[taŋ˥˩꜒]	[taŋ˥˧꜓]
1	tang¹⁻⁵	[taŋ˥꜕꜓]	[taŋ˦꜕꜓]
8	tak⁸⁻⁴	[tak˦꜔꜕]	[tak˥꜕꜖]
8	tah⁸⁻⁵	[taʔ˦꜕꜓]	[taʔ˥꜕꜓]
4	tak⁴⁻⁸	[tak˧˨꜓]	[tak˨˩꜒]
4	tah⁴⁻²	[taʔ˧˨꜒꜖]	[taʔ˨˩꜒꜔]

See Tiuⁿ (2001), Chiung (2003) and the work of Robert L. Cheng (鄭良偉; Tēⁿ Liông-úi or Tēnn Liông-úi) for modern linguistic approaches to tones and tone sandhi in Taiwanese.

=== Syllabic structure ===
A syllable requires a vowel (or diphthong or triphthong) to appear in the middle. All consonants can appear at the initial position. The consonants ⟨p, t, k⟩ and ⟨m, n, ng⟩ (and some consider ⟨h⟩) may appear at the end of a syllable. Therefore, it is possible to have syllables such as ⟨ngiau⟩ ("(to) tickle") and ⟨thng⟩ ("soup").

== Lexicon ==
Modern linguistic studies (by Robert L. Cheng and Chin-An Li, for example) estimate that most (75% to 90%) Taiwanese words have cognates in other Sinitic languages. False friends do exist; for example, cháu/tsáu (走) means "to run" in Taiwanese, whereas the Mandarin cognate, zǒu, means "to walk". Moreover, cognates may have different lexical categories; for example, the morpheme phīⁿ/phīnn (鼻) means not only "nose" (a noun, as in Mandarin bí) but also "to smell" (a verb, unlike Mandarin).

Among the apparently cognate-less words are many basic words with properties that contrast with similar-meaning words of pan-Chinese derivation. Often the former group lacks a standard Han character, and the words are variously considered colloquial, intimate, vulgar, uncultured, or more concrete in meaning than the pan-Chinese synonym. Some examples: lâng (人 or 儂, person, concrete) vs. jîn (人, person, abstract); cha-bó͘/tsa-bóo (查某, woman) vs. lú-jîn (女人, woman, literary). Unlike the English Germanic/Latin contrast, however, the two groups of Taiwanese words cannot be as strongly attributed to the influences of two disparate linguistic sources.

Extensive contact with the Japanese language has left a legacy of Japanese loanwords, with 172 recorded in the Ministry of Education's Dictionary of Frequently-Used Taiwan Minnan. Although a very small percentage of the vocabulary, their usage tends to be high-frequency because of their relevance to modern society and popular culture. Examples are: o͘-tó͘-bái/oo-tóo-bái from ōtobai (オートバイ; "autobike"/motorcycle) and pháng from pan (パン; "bread", itself a loanword from Portuguese). Grammatical particles borrowed from Japanese, notably te̍k/ti̍k from teki (的) and ka from ka (か), show up in the Taiwanese of older speakers.

Whereas Mandarin attaches a syllabic suffix to the singular pronoun to make a collective form, Taiwanese pronouns are collectivized through nasalization. For example, i (he/she/it) and goá/guá (I) become in (they) and goán/guán (we), respectively. The -n thus represents a subsyllabic morpheme. Like all other varieties of Chinese, Taiwanese does not have true grammatical plurals.

Unlike English, Taiwanese has two first-person plural pronouns. This distinction is called inclusive, which includes the addressee, and exclusive, which excludes the addressee. Thus, goán/guán means we excluding you, while lán means we including you (similar to pluralis auctoris). The inclusive lán may be used to express politeness or solidarity, as in the example of a speaker asking a stranger "Where do we live?" while implicitly asking "Where do you live?".

== Syntax ==
Kin-á-ji̍t hit ê cha-bó͘ gín-á lâi góan tau khòaⁿ góa./Kin-á-ji̍t hit ê tsa-bóo gín-á lâi gúan tau khùann gúa.
An audio sample for a simple sentence, meaning "Today that little girl came to our house to see me".

The syntax of Taiwanese is similar to southern Sinitic languages such as Hakka and Yue. The subject–verb–object sequence is typical as in, for example, Mandarin, but subject–object–verb or the passive voice (with the sequence object–subject–verb) is possible with particles. Take a simple sentence for example: 'I hold you.' The words involved are: goá/guá ('I' or 'me'), phō ('to hold'), lí ('you').

- Subject–verb–object (typical sequence): The sentence in the typical sequence would be: Goá phō lí./Guá phō lí. ('I hold you.')
- Subject–kā–object–verb: Another sentence of roughly equivalent meaning is Goá kā lí phō/Guá kā lí phō., with the slight connotation of 'I take you and hold' or 'I get to you and hold'.
- Object–hō͘/hōo–subject–verb (the passive voice): Then, Lí hō͘ goá phō/Lí hōo guá phō means the same thing but in the passive voice, with the connotation of 'You allow yourself to be held by me' or 'You make yourself available for my holding'.

The word hō͘/hōo also has other uses, such as to introduce an embedded clause: Goá hō͘ lí chúi lim/Guá hōo lí tsúi lim ('I give water for you to drink': chúi/tsúi means 'water'; lim is 'to drink').

== Scripts and orthographies ==
Until the late 19th century, Taiwanese speakers wrote mostly in Classical Chinese, although songbooks using Han characters are attested from the 1820s. Among many systems of writing Taiwanese using Latin characters, the most used is called Pe̍h-ōe-jī (POJ) and was developed in the 19th century, while the Taiwanese Romanization System (Tâi-lô) has been officially promoted since 2006 by Taiwan's Ministry of Education. (For additional romanized systems, see references in "Orthography in Latin characters", below.) Nonetheless, Taiwanese speakers nowadays most commonly write in Mandarin, though many of the same characters are also used to write Taiwanese.

=== Han characters ===
In most cases, Taiwanese speakers write using the script called Han characters as in Mandarin, although there are a number of special characters which are unique to Taiwanese and which are sometimes used in informal writing. Where Han characters are used, they are not always etymological or genetic; the borrowing of similar-sounding or similar-meaning characters is a common practice. Bilingual speakers of both Mandarin and Taiwanese sometimes attempt to represent the sounds by adopting similar-sounding Mandarin Han characters. For example, the Han characters of the vulgar slang 'khoàⁿ sáⁿ-siâu' or 'khuánn sánn-siâu' (看三小, substituted for the etymologically correct 看啥潲, meaning 'What the hell are you looking at?') has very little meaning in Mandarin and may not be readily understood by a Taiwanese monolingual, as knowledge of Mandarin character readings is required to fully decipher it.

In 2007, the Ministry of Education in Taiwan published the first list of Taiwanese Southern Min Recommended Characters, a list of 300 Han characters standardized for the use of writing Taiwanese and implemented the teaching of them in schools. In 2008, the ministry published a second list of 100 characters, and in 2009 added 300 more, giving a total of 700 standardized characters used to write uniquely Taiwanese words. With increasing literacy in Taiwanese, there are currently more Taiwanese online bloggers who write Taiwanese online using these standardized Chinese characters. Han characters are also used by Taiwan's Hokkien literary circle for Hokkien poets and writers to write literature or poetry in Taiwanese.

=== Orthography in Latin characters ===
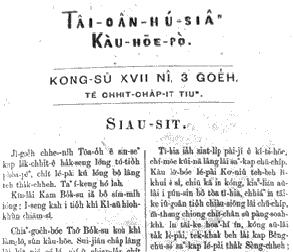
An issue of the Taiwan Church News, first published by Presbyterian missionaries in 1885. This was the first printed newspaper in Taiwan, and was written in Taiwanese, in the Latin orthography Pe̍h-ōe-jī.

There are several Latin-based orthographies, the oldest being Pe̍h-ōe-jī (POJ, meaning "vernacular writing"), developed in the 19th century. Taiwanese Romanization System (Tâi-ôan lô-má-jī, Tâi-lô) and Taiwanese Language Phonetic Alphabet (TLPA) are two later adaptations of POJ. Other 20th-century innovations include Daighi tongiong pingim (DT), Ganvsig daiuuan bhanlam ghiw tongiong pingimv (GDT), Modern Literal Taiwanese (MLT), Simplified MLT (SMLT), Phofsit Daibuun (PSDB). The last four employ tonal spelling to indicate tone without use of diacritic symbols, but letters instead.

In POJ, the traditional list of letters is

a b ch chh e g h i j k kh l m n ng o o͘ p ph s t th (ts) u

Twenty-four in all, including the obsolete ⟨ts⟩, which was used to represent the modern ⟨ch⟩ at some places. The additional necessities are the nasal symbol ⟨ⁿ⟩ (superscript ⟨n⟩; the uppercase form ⟨^{N}⟩ is sometimes used in all caps texts, such as book titles or section headings), and the tonal diacritics. POJ was developed first by Presbyterian missionaries and later by the indigenous Presbyterian Church in Taiwan; they have been active in promoting the language since the late 19th century. Recently there has been an increase in texts using a mixed orthography of Han characters and romanization, although these texts remain uncommon.

In 2006, the National Languages Committee (Ministry of Education, Republic of China) proposed its Taiwanese Romanization System (Tâi-ôan Lô-má-jī pheng-im, Tâi-Lô). This alphabet reconciles two orthographies, TLPA and POJ. The changes for the consonants involved using ⟨ts⟩ for POJ's ⟨ch⟩ (reverting to the orthography in the 19th century), and ⟨tsh⟩ for ⟨chh⟩. For the vowels, ⟨o͘⟩ could optionally be represented as ⟨oo⟩. The nasal mark ⟨ⁿ⟩ could also be represented optionally as ⟨nn⟩. The rest of the alphabet, most notably the use of diacritics to mark the tones, appeared to keep to the POJ tradition. One of the aims of this compromise was to curb any increase of 'market share' for Daighi tongiong pingim/Tongyong Pinyin. It is unclear whether the community will adopt this new agreement.

=== Orthographies in kana and in bopomofo ===
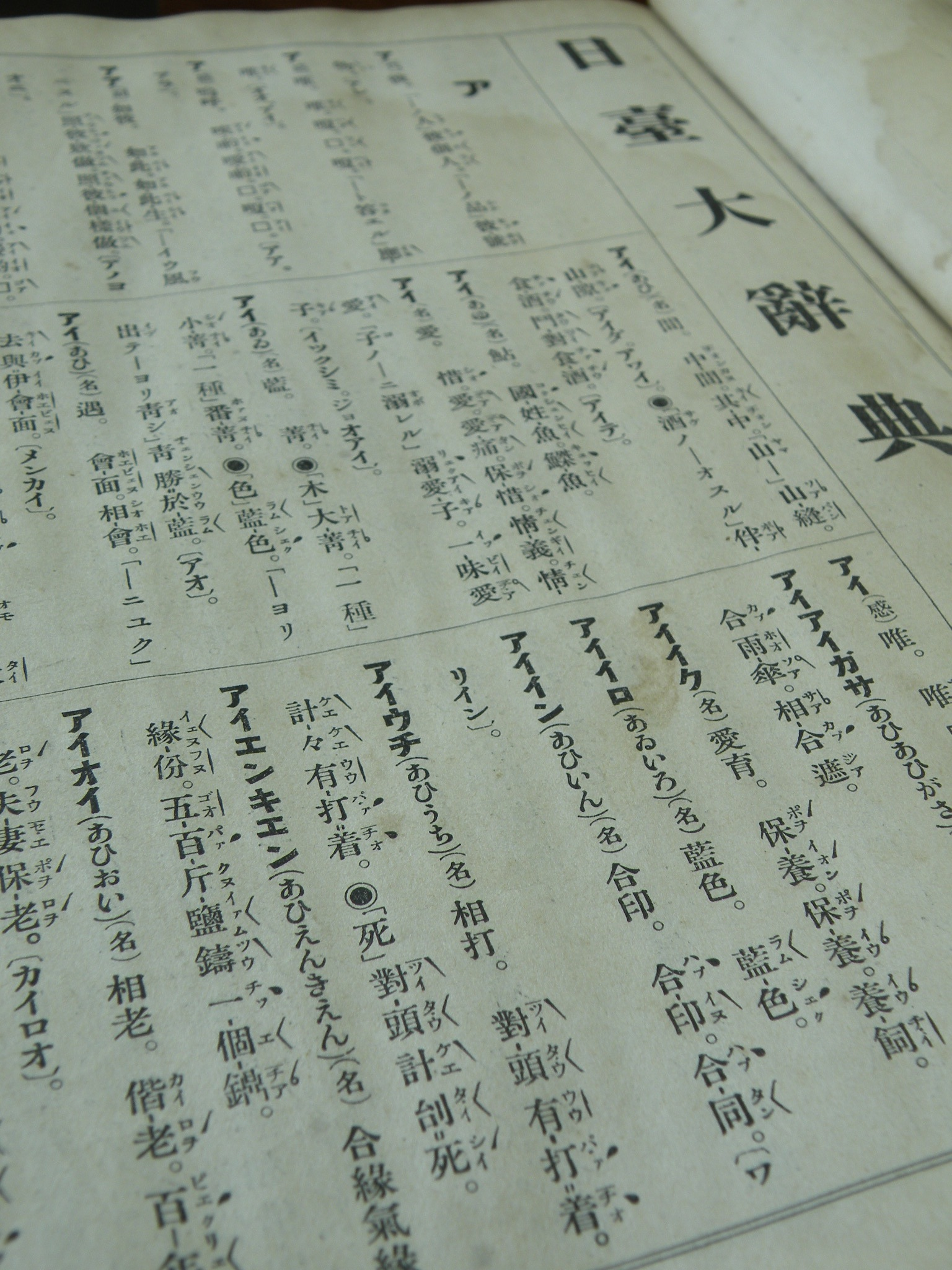
Japanese–Taiwanese Dictionary, using the orthography in kana

There was an orthography of Taiwanese based on the Japanese kana during Japanese rule. The Kuomintang government also tried to introduce an orthography in bopomofo.

=== Comparison of orthographies ===
Here the different orthographies are compared:

Vowels
IPA	Pe̍h-ōe-jī	Tâi-lô	TLPA	BP	MLT	DT	Kana	Phonetic Symbols	Hangul	Example	
IPA	Pe̍h-ōe-jī	Tâi-lô	TLPA	BP	MLT	DT	Kana	Phonetic Symbols	Hangul	Traditional	Simplified
a	a	a	a	a	a	a	アア	ㄚ	ᅡ	亞洲	亚洲
ap	ap	ap	ap	ap	ab/ap	āp/ap	アㇷ゚	ㄚㆴ	압	壓力	压力
at	at	at	at	at	ad/at	āt/at	アッ	ㄚㆵ	앋	警察	警察
ak	ak	ak	ak	ak	ag/ak	āk/ak	アㇰ	ㄚㆻ	악	沃水	沃水
aʔ	ah	ah	ah	ah	aq/ah	āh/ah	アァ	ㄚㆷ	앟	牛肉	牛肉
ã	aⁿ	ann	ann/aN	na	va	ann/aⁿ	アア	ㆩ	앗	三十	三十
ɔ	o͘	oo	oo	oo	o	o	オオ	ㆦ	ᅩ	烏色	乌色
ɔk	ok	ok	ok	ok	og/ok	ok	オㇰ	ㆦㆻ	옥	中國	中国
ɔ̃	oⁿ	onn	oonn/ooN	noo	vo	onn/oⁿ	オオ	ㆧ	옷	否	否
ə	o	o	o	o	ø	or	オ̅オ̅	ㄜ	ᅥ	澳洲	澳洲
o	o	o	o	o	ø	or	ヲヲ	ㄛ	ᅥ	澳洲	澳洲
e	e	e	e	e	e	e	エエ	ㆤ	ᅦ	下晡	下晡
ẽ	eⁿ	enn	enn/eN	ne	ve	enn/eⁿ	エエ	ㆥ	엣	青	青
i	i	i	i	i	i	i	イイ	ㄧ	ᅵ	醫學	医学
iɛn	ian	ian	ian	ian	ien	ian/en	イェヌ	ㄧㄢ	엔	鉛筆	铅笔
iəŋ	eng	ing	ing	ing	eng	ing	イェン	ㄧㄥ	영	英國	英国
iək	ek	ik	ik	ik	eg/ek	ik	イェㇰ	ㄧㆻ	역	翻譯	翻译
ĩ	iⁿ	inn	inn/iN	ni	vi	inn/iⁿ	イイ	ㆪ	잇	病院	病院
ai	ai	ai	ai	ai	ai	ai	アイ	ㄞ	ᅢ	愛情	爱情
aĩ	aiⁿ	ainn	ainn/aiN	nai	vai	ainn/aiⁿ	アイ	ㆮ	앳	載	载
au	au	au	au	au	au	au	アウ	ㆯ	알	歐洲	欧洲
am	am	am	am	am	am	am	アム	ㆰ	암	暗時	暗时
ɔm	om	om	om	om	om	om	オム	ㆱ	옴	參	参
m̩	m	m	m	m	m	m	ム	ㆬ	음	阿姆	阿姆
ɔŋ	ong	ong	ong	ong	ong	ong	オン	ㆲ	옹	王梨	王梨
ŋ̍	ng	ng	ng	ng	ng	ng	ン	ㆭ	응	黃色	黄色
u	u	u	u	u	u	u	ウウ	ㄨ	ᅮ	有無	有无
ua	oa	ua	ua	ua	oa	ua	ヲア	ㄨㄚ	ᅪ	歌曲	歌曲
ue	oe	ue	ue	ue	oe	ue	ヲエ	ㄨㆤ	ᅰ	講話	讲话
uai	oai	uai	uai	uai	oai	uai	ヲァイ	ㄨㄞ	ᅫ	奇怪	奇怪
uan	oan	uan	uan	uan	oan	uan	ヲァヌ	ㄨㄢ	왠	人員	人员
ɨ	i	ir	ir	i	i	i	ウ̅ウ̅	ㆨ	ᅵ	豬肉	猪肉
(i)ũ	(i)uⁿ	(i)unn	(i)unn/uN	n(i)u	v(i)u	(i)unn/uⁿ	ウウ	ㆫ	윳	舀水	舀水

Consonants
IPA	Pe̍h-ōe-jī	Tâi-lô	TLPA	BP	MLT	DT	Kana	Phonetic Symbols	Hangul	Example	
IPA	Pe̍h-ōe-jī	Tâi-lô	TLPA	BP	MLT	DT	Kana	Phonetic Symbols	Hangul	Traditional	Simplified
p	p	p	p	b	p	b	パア	ㄅ	ᄇ	報紙	报纸
b	b	b	b	bb	b	bh	バア	ㆠ	ᄈ	閩南	闽南
pʰ	ph	ph	ph	p	ph	p	パ̣ア	ㄆ	ᄑ	普通	普通
m	m	m	m	bbn	m	m	マア	ㄇ	ᄆ	請問	请问
t	t	t	t	d	t	d	タア	ㄉ	ᄃ	豬肉	猪肉
tʰ	th	th	th	t	th	t	タ̣ア	ㄊ	ᄐ	普通	普通
n	n	n	n	ln	n	n	ナア	ㄋ	ᄂ	過年	过年
nŋ	nng	nng	nng	lng	nng	nng	ヌン	ㄋㆭ		雞卵	鸡卵
l	l	l	l	l	l	l	ラア	ㄌ	ᄅ	樂觀	乐观
k	k	k	k	g	k	g	カア	ㄍ	ᄀ	價值	价值
ɡ	g	g	g	gg	g	gh	ガア	ㆣ	ᄁ	牛奶	牛奶
kʰ	kh	kh	kh	k	kh	k	カ̣ア	ㄎ	ᄏ	客廳	客厅
h	h	h	h	h	h	h	ハア	ㄏ	ᄒ	煩惱	烦恼
tɕi	chi	tsi	zi	zi	ci	zi	チイ	ㄐ	ᄌ	支持	支持
dʑi	ji	ji	ji	li	ji	r	ジイ	ㆢ	ᄍ	漢字	汉字
tɕʰi	chhi	tshi	ci	ci	chi	ci	チ̣イ	ㄑ	ᄎ	支持	支持
ɕi	si	si	si	si	si	si	シイ	ㄒ	ㅅ	是否	是否
ts	ch	ts	z	z	z	z	サ̅ア	ㄗ	ᄌ	報紙	报纸
dz	j	j	j	l	j	r	ザア	ㆡ	ᄍ	熱天	热天
tsʰ	chh	tsh	c	c	zh	c	サ̣̅ア	ㄘ	ᄎ	参加	参加
s	s	s	s	s	s	s	サア	ㄙ	ㅅ	司法	司法

Tones
Tone name	IPA	Pe̍h-ōe-jī	Tâi-lô	TLPA	BP	MLT	DT	Kana (normal vowels)	Kana (nasal vowels)	Phonetic Symbols	Hangul	Example	
Tone name	IPA	Pe̍h-ōe-jī	Tâi-lô	TLPA	BP	MLT	DT	Kana (normal vowels)	Kana (nasal vowels)	Phonetic Symbols	Hangul	Traditional	Simplified
Yin level (陰平 1)	a˥	a	a	a1	ā	af	a	アア	アア	ㄚ	ᄋ	公司	公司
Yin rising (陰上 2)	a˥˧	á	á	a2	ǎ	ar	à	アア	アア	ㄚˋ	ᄅ	報紙	报纸
Yin departing (陰去 3)	a˨˩	à	à	a3	à	ax	â	アア	アア	ㄚ˪	ᄂ	興趣	兴趣
Yin entering (陰入 4)	ap˩ at˩ ak˩ aʔ˩	ap at ak ah	ah	a4	āp āt āk āh	ab ad ag aq	āp āt āk āh	アㇷ゚ アッ アㇰ アァ	アㇷ゚ アッ アㇰ アァ	ㄚㆴ ㄚㆵ ㄚㆻ ㄚㆷ	ᄋ	血壓 警察 中國 牛肉	血压 警察 中国 牛肉
Yang level (陽平 5)	a˧˥	â	â	a5	ǎ	aa	ǎ	アア	アア	ㄚˊ	ᄉ	人員	人员
Yang rising (陽上 6)		ǎ	ǎ	a6		aar						老爸	老爸
Yang departing (陽去 7)	a˧	ā	ā	a7	â	a	ā	アア	アア	ㄚ˫	ᄀ	草地	草地
Yang entering (陽入 8)	ap˥ at˥ ak˥ aʔ˥	a̍p a̍t a̍k a̍h	a̍h	a8	áp át ák áh	ap at ak ah	ap at ak ah	アㇷ゚ アッ アㇰ アァ	アㇷ゚ アッ アㇰ アァ	ㄚㆴ˙ ㄚㆵ˙ ㄚㆻ˙ ㄚㆷ˙	ᄇ	配合 法律 文學 歇熱	配合 法律 文学 歇热
High rising (9)	a˥˥	ă	a̋	a9			á				ㅋ	昨昏	昨昏
Neutral (0)	a˨	--a	--ah	a0		~a	å					入去	入去

- Note: The bopomofo extended characters in the zhuyin row require a UTF-8 font capable of displaying Unicode values 31A0–31B7 (ex. Code2000 true type font).

=== Computing ===
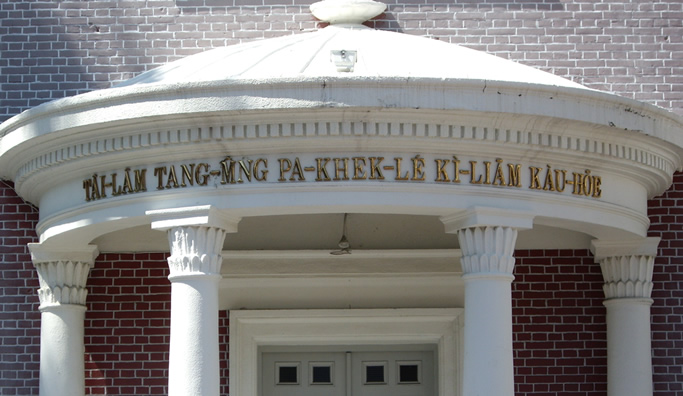
Pe̍h-ōe-jī inscription at a church in Tâi-lâm commemorating Thomas Barclay.

Many keyboard layouts and input methods for entering either Latin or Han characters in Taiwanese are available. Some of them are free of charge, and some are commercial.

The Min Nan dialect group is registered per RFC 3066 as zh-min-nan. Taiwanese Min Nan can be represented as 'zh-min-nan-TW'.

When writing Taiwanese in Han characters, some writers create 'new' characters when they consider it is impossible to use directly or borrow existing ones; this corresponds to similar practices in character usage in Cantonese, Vietnamese chữ nôm, Korean hanja and Japanese kanji. These are usually not encoded in Unicode (or the corresponding ISO/IEC 10646: Universal Character Set), thus creating problems in computer processing.

All Latin characters required by Pe̍h-ōe-jī can be represented using Unicode (or the corresponding ISO/IEC 10646: Universal character set), using precomposed or combining (diacritics) characters.

Prior to June 2004, the vowel [ɔ] akin to but more open than ⟨o⟩, written with a 'dot above right', was not encoded. The usual workaround was to use the (stand-alone; spacing) character 'middle dot' (U+00B7, ⟨·⟩) or, less commonly, the combining character 'dot above' (U+0307). As these are far from ideal, since 1997, proposals have been submitted to the ISO/IEC working group in charge of ISO/IEC 10646 – namely, ISO/IEC JTC1/SC2/WG2 – to encode a new combining character 'dot above right'. This is now officially assigned to U+0358 (see documents N1593, N2507, N2628, N2699, and N2770). Font support has followed: for example, in Charis SIL.

== Sociolinguistics ==
=== Regional variations ===
Distribution of Taiwanese: Quanzhou dialect predominant Zhangzhou dialect predominant Both Quanzhou and Zhangzhou dialects

The prestige variant of Taiwanese Hokkien is the southern speech found in Tainan and Kaohsiung. Other major variants are the northern speech, the central speech (near Taichung and the port town of Lukang), and the northern (northeastern) coastal speech (dominant in Yilan).

The distinguishing feature of the coastal speech is the use of the vowel ⟨uiⁿ⟩ or ⟨uinn⟩ in place of ⟨ng⟩. The northern speech is distinguished by the absence of the 8th tone, and some vowel exchanges (for example, ⟨i⟩ and ⟨u⟩, ⟨e⟩ and ⟨oe⟩ or ⟨ue⟩). The central speech has an additional vowel [ɨ] or [ø] between ⟨i⟩ and ⟨u⟩, which may be represented as ⟨ö⟩. There are also a number of other pronunciation and lexical differences between the Taiwanese variants; the online Ministry of Education dictionary specifies these to a resolution of eight regions on Taiwan proper, in addition to Kinmen and Penghu.

Concerning the fifth (rising) tone in normal sandhi patterns, the Quanzhou/Coastal/Northern dialects change to the seventh (mid-level) tone, whereas the Zhangzhou/"Mixed"/Southern dialects change to the third (low falling) tone.

Certain new north–south distinctions have appeared in recent decades. The fourth and eighth tones tend to be reversed in the north and south.

==== Quanzhou–Zhangzhou inclinations ====
Hokkien immigrants to Taiwan originated from Quanzhou prefecture (44.8%) and Zhangzhou prefecture (35.2%). The original phonology from these regions was spread around Taiwan during the immigration process. With the advanced development of transportation and greater mobility of the Taiwanese population, Taiwanese speech has steered itself towards a mixture of Quanzhou and Zhangzhou speech, known as Chiang–Chôan-lām/Tsiang–Tsûan-lām (漳泉濫, in Mandarin Zhāng–Quán làn). Due to different proportions of the mixture, some regions are inclined more towards the Quanzhou accent, while others are inclined more towards the Zhangzhou accent.

In general, the Quanzhou accent is more common along the coastal region and is known as the hái-kháu accent; the Zhangzhou accent is more common within the mountainous region of Taiwan and is known as the lāi-po͘/lāi-poo accent. The regional variation within Taiwanese may be attributed to variations in the mixture of Quanzhou and Zhangzhou accents and/or lexicons. It ranges from Lukang accent (based on Quanzhou accent) on one end to the northern coastal Yilan accent (based on Zhangzhou accent) on another end. Tainan, Kaohsiung, and Taitung accents, on the other hand, are closest to the prestige accent.

Variations in Taiwanese Hokkien accents

Quanzhou accent
Lukang
Penghu, Taixi, Dajia—Budai coastal region (hái-kháu)
Taipei, Hsinchu (very similar to Tong'an accent)
Chiayi—Kaohsiung surrounding

area, Taitung (similar to Amoy accent)

Taichung, Changhua—Yunlin inland area, North Taoyuan (lāi-po͘/lāi-poo)
Yilan
Zhangzhou accent

==== Recent terminological distinctions ====
Recent research has found a need for new terminology of Taiwanese dialects, mainly because the Quanzhou and Zhangzhou dialects in Taiwan developed independently from those in Fujian. Thus, some scholars (i.e., Klöter, following 董忠司) have divided Taiwanese into five subdialects, based on geographic region:

1. hái-kháu (海口腔): west coast, based on what was formerly referred to as Quanzhou dialect (represented by the Lukang accent)
2. phian-hái (偏海腔): coastal (represented by the Nanliao (南寮) accent)
3. lāi-po͘/lāi-poo (內埔腔): western inner plain, mountain regions, based on the Zhangzhou dialect (represented by the Yilan accent)
4. phian-lāi (偏內腔): interior (represented by the Taibao accent)
5. thong-hêng/thong-hîng (通行腔): common accents (represented by the Taipei (spec. Datong) accent in the north and the Tainan accent in the south)

Both phian-hái and phian-lāi are intermediate dialects between hái-kháu and lāi-po͘/lāi-poo, these also known as thong-hêng/thong-hîng (通行腔) or "不泉不漳". In some ways this mixed dialect is similar to the Amoy dialect, which itself is a blend of Quanzhou and Zhangzhou speech. The common dialect refers to that which can be heard on radio, television, official announcements, etc.

=== Fluency ===
A great majority of people in Taiwan can speak both Mandarin and Hokkien, but the degree of fluency varies widely. There are, however, small but significant numbers of people in Taiwan, mainly but not exclusively Hakka and Mainlanders, who cannot speak Taiwanese fluently. A shrinking percentage of the population, mainly people born before the 1950s, cannot speak Mandarin at all or learned to speak Mandarin later in life, though some of these speak Japanese fluently. Urban, working-class Hakkas, as well as younger, southern-Taiwan Mainlanders, tend to have better, even native-like fluency. Approximately half of the Hakka in Taiwan do speak Taiwanese. There are many families of mixed Hakka, Hoklo, and Aboriginal bloodlines. There is, however, a large percentage of people in Taiwan, regardless of their background, whose ability to understand and read written Taiwanese is greater than their ability to speak it. This is the case with some singers who can sing Taiwanese songs with native-like proficiency but can neither speak nor understand the language.

Which variant is used depends strongly on the context, and in general, people will use Mandarin in more formal situations and Taiwanese in more informal situations. Taiwanese tends to get used more in rural areas, while Mandarin is used more in urban settings. Older people tend to use Taiwanese, while younger people tend to use Mandarin. In the broadcast media where Mandarin is used in many genres, soap opera, variety shows, and even some news programs can also be found in Taiwanese.

=== Special literary and art forms ===
Chhit-jī-á/Tshit-jī-á (literally, "that which has seven syllables") is a poetic meter where each verse has 7 syllables.

There is a special form of musical/dramatic performance koa-á-hì/kua-á-hì: the Taiwanese opera; the subject matter is usually a historical event. A similar form pò͘-tē-hì/pòo-tē-hì (glove puppetry) is also unique and has been elaborated in the past two decades into impressive televised spectacles.

See Taiwanese cuisine for names of several local dishes.

=== Bible translations ===
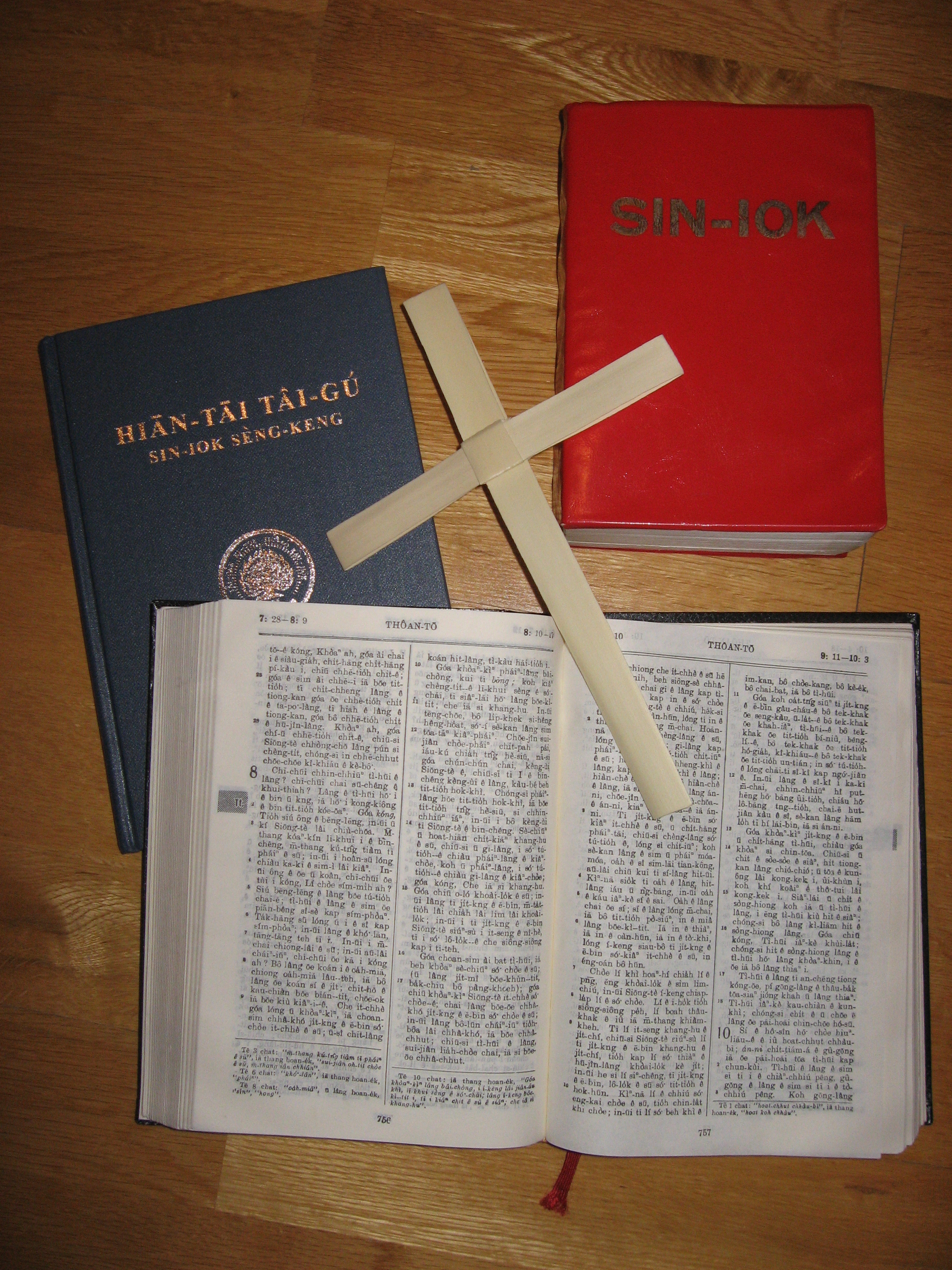
A collection of translations of the Bible in Taiwanese. Top left, Today's Taiwanese version; top right, the Red-Cover Bible; bottom, Barclay's translation.

As with many other languages, the translations of the Bible in Taiwan marked milestones in the standardization attempts of the language and its orthography.

The first translation of the Bible in Amoy or Taiwanese in the Pe̍h-ōe-jī orthography was by the first missionary to Taiwan, James Laidlaw Maxwell, with the New Testament Lán ê Kiù-chú Iâ-so͘ Ki-tok ê Sin-iok published in 1873 and the Old Testament Kū-iok ê Sèng Keng in 1884.

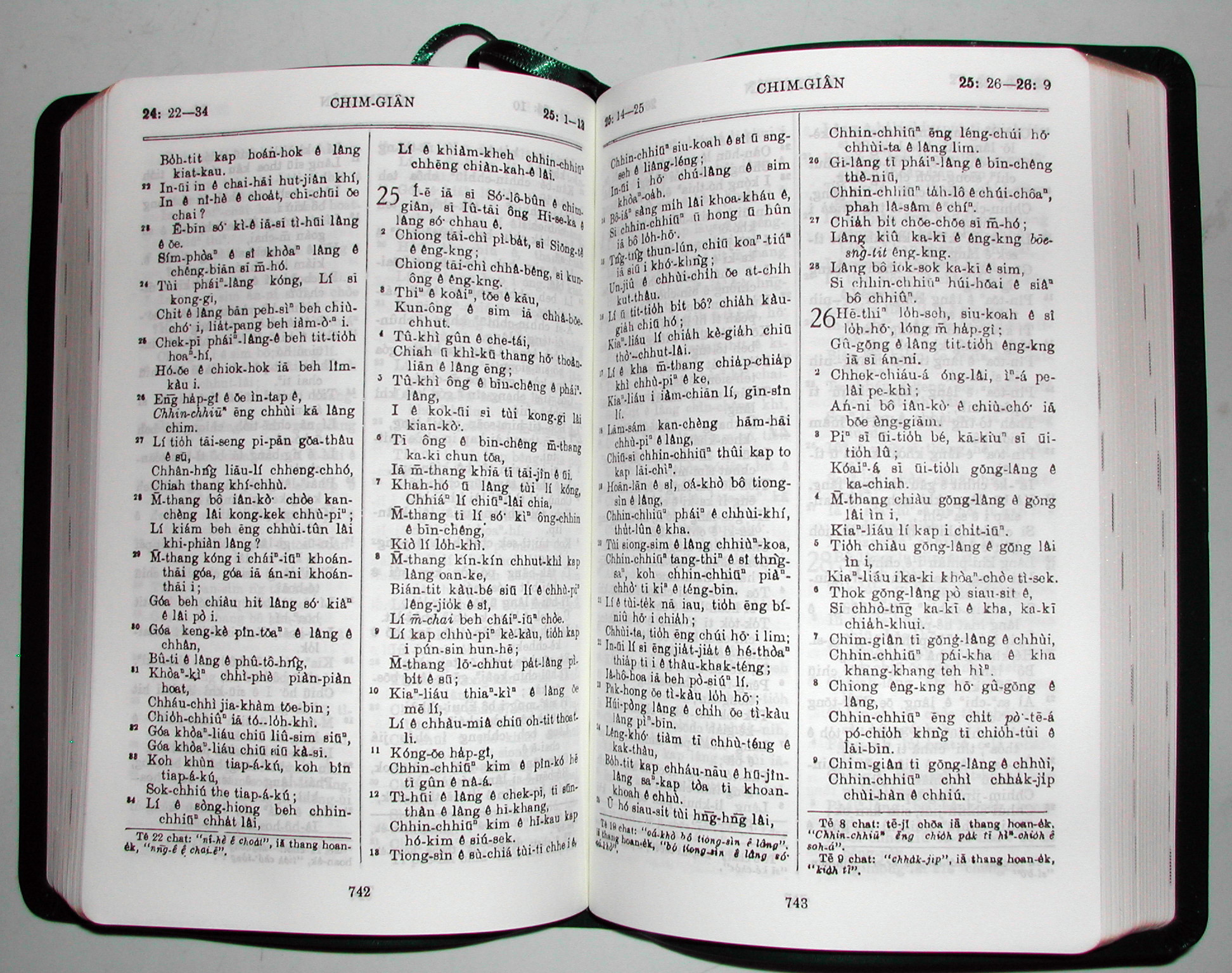
A copy of Barclay's Amoy translation, opened to the Proverbs.

The next translation of the Bible in Taiwanese or Amoy was by the missionary to Taiwan, Thomas Barclay, carried out in Fujian and Taiwan. A New Testament translation was completed and published in 1916. The resulting work containing the Old and the New Testaments, in the Pe̍h-ōe-jī orthography, was completed in 1930 and published in 1933 as the Amoy Romanized Bible (Pe̍h-ōe-jī: Sin-kū-iok ê Sèng-keng; Tâi-lô: Sin-kū-iok ê Sìng-kìng). 2000 copies of the Amoy Romanized Bible were confiscated by the Taiwan Garrison from the Bible Society of Taiwan in 1975. This edition was later transliterated into Han characters and published as Sèng-keng Tâi-gí Hàn-jī Pún (聖經台語漢字本) in 1996.

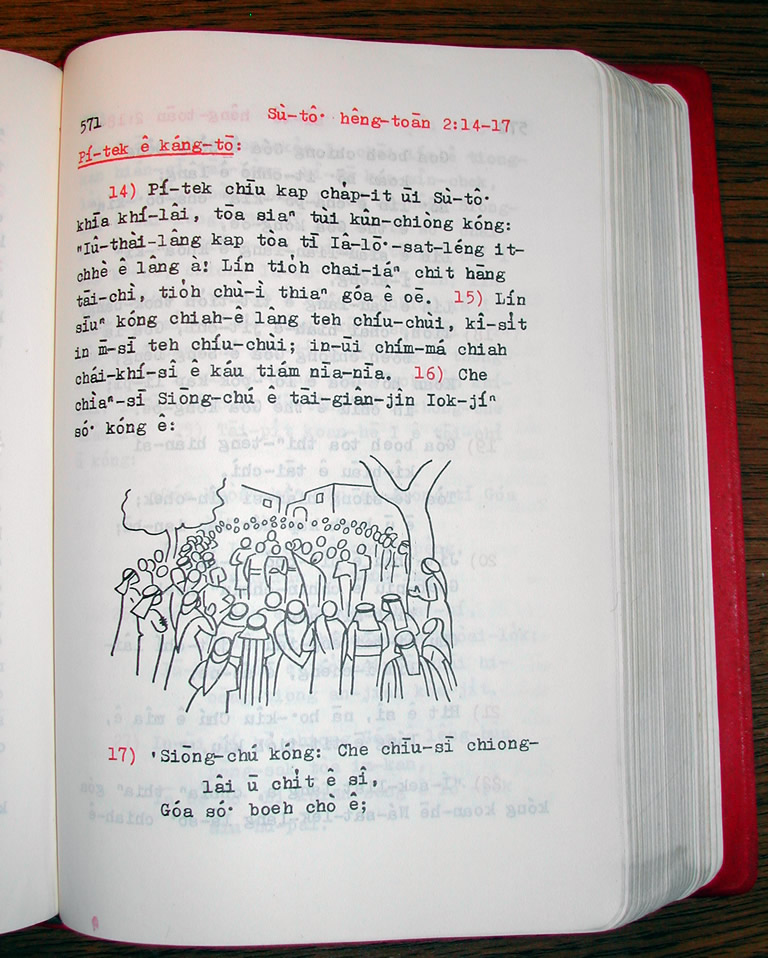
A page from the Red-Cover Bible

The Ko–Tân (Kerygma) Colloquial Taiwanese Version of the New Testament (Sin-iok) in Pe̍h-ōe-jī, also known as the Red Cover Bible (Âng-phoê Sèng-keng; Âng-phuê Sìng-king), was published in 1973 as an ecumenical effort between the Protestant Presbyterian Church in Taiwan and the Roman Catholic mission Maryknoll. This translation used a more modern vocabulary (somewhat influenced by Mandarin), and reflected the central Taiwan dialect, as the Maryknoll mission was based near Tâi-tiong. It was soon confiscated by the Kuomintang government (which objected to the use of Latin orthography) in 1975.

A translation using the principle of functional equivalence, "Today's Taiwanese Romanized Version" (現代台語譯本; Hiān-tāi Tâi-gú E̍k-pún; Hiān-tāi Tâi-gú I̍k-pún), containing only the New Testament, again in Pe̍h-ōe-jī, was published in 2008 as a collaboration between the Presbyterian Church in Taiwan and the Bible Society in Taiwan; a parallel-text version with both Han-character and Pe̍h-ōe-jī orthographies was published in 2013. A translation of the Old Testament following the same principle was completed and the whole Bible was published in 2021 as a parallel-text volume.

Another translation using the principle of functional equivalence, "Common Taiwanese Bible" (Choân-bîn Tâi-gí Sèng-keng; Tsuân-bîn Tâi-gí Sìng-king), with versions of Pe̍h-ōe-jī, Han characters and Ruby version (both Han characters and Pe̍h-ōe-jī) was published in 2015, available in printed and online.

Translation	John 3:16
1933 Taiwanese Bible Romanized Character Edition (Thomas Barclay)	In-ūi Siōng-tè chiong to̍k-siⁿ ê Kiáⁿ siúⁿ-sù sè-kan, hō͘ kìⁿ-nā sìn I ê lâng bōe tîm-lûn, ōe tit-tio̍h éng-oa̍h; I thiàⁿ sè-kan kàu án-ni.
1973 Ko–Tân/Kerygma “Red Cover Bible” (Âng-phoê Sèng-keng)	Siōng-chú chiah-ni̍h thiàⁿ sè-kan-lâng, só͘-í chiah chiong I ê Ko͘-kiáⁿ siúⁿ-sù in, thang hō͘ só͘ ū sìn I ê lâng m̄-bián bia̍t-bông, lâi tit-tio̍h éng-seng.
1996 Taiwanese Bible Han Character Edition	因為上帝將獨生的子賞賜世間，互見若信伊的人，𣍐沈淪，會得著永活，伊疼世間到按呢。
2013 ≈ 2021 Today’s Taiwanese Romanized Version (Hiān-tāi Tâi-gú E̍k-pún)	Siōng-tè liân I to̍k-it ê Kiáⁿ to sù hō͘ sè-kan, beh hō͘ ta̍k ê sìn I ê lâng bián bia̍t-bông, hoán-tńg tit-tio̍h éng-oán ê oa̍h-miā, I chiah-ni̍h thiàⁿ sè-kan!
2015 Common Taiwanese Bible" (Choân-bîn Tâi-gí Sèng-keng)	Siōng-tè chiah-ni̍h thiàⁿ sè-kan, sīm-chì siúⁿ-sù to̍k-seⁿ Kiáⁿ, hō͘ só͘-ū sìn I ê lâng bē tîm-lûn, hoán-tńg ē tit tio̍h éng-oán ê oa̍h-miā.

=== Politics ===
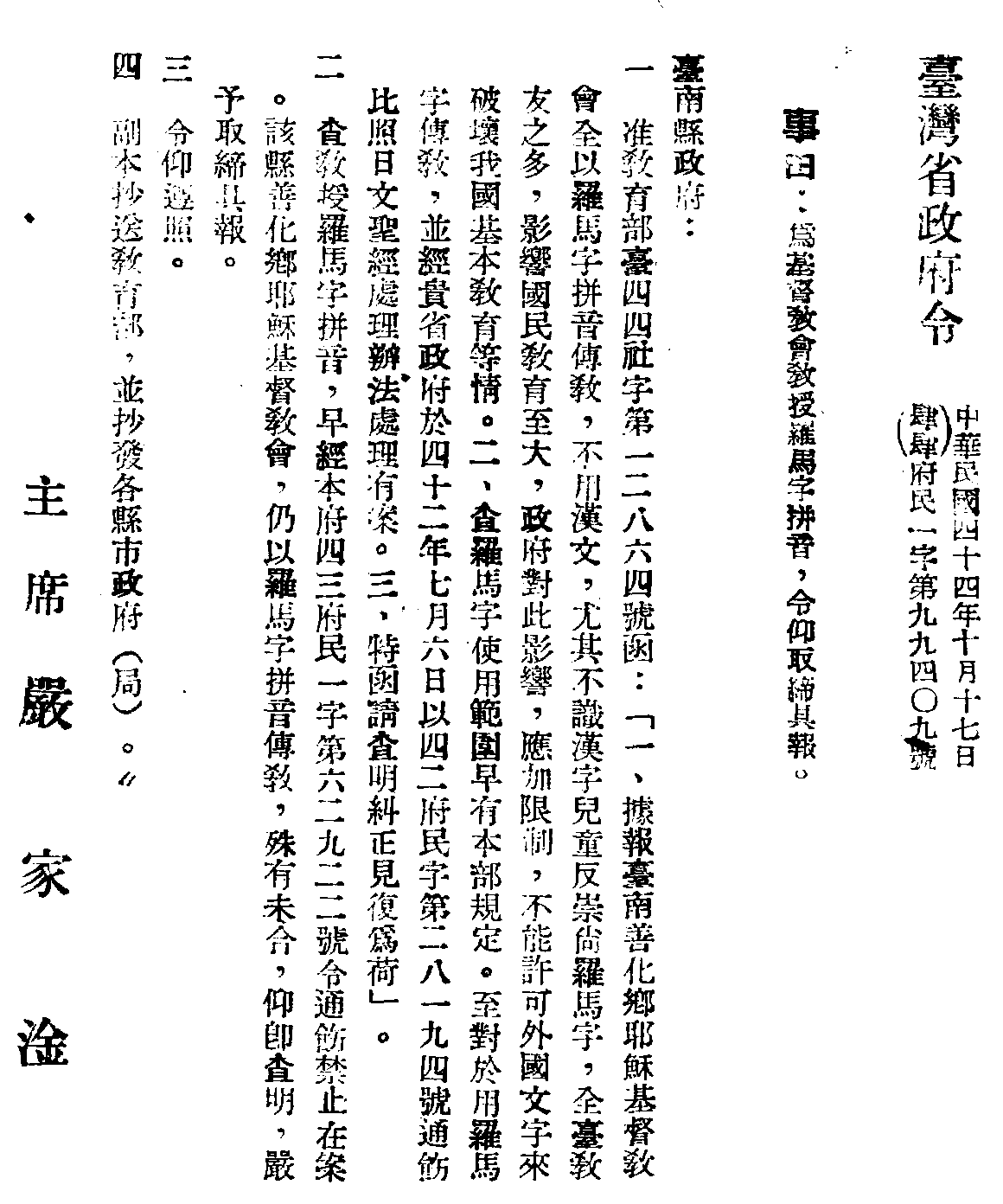
A decree (1955) banning the use of Pe̍h-ōe-jī, a Latin orthography for Taiwanese, in church.

Until the 1980s, the use of Taiwanese Hokkien, along with all varieties other than Mandarin, was discouraged by the Kuomintang through measures such as banning its use in schools and limiting the amount of Taiwanese broadcast on radio and television. These restrictions were lifted by the 1990s, and the Taiwanese became an emblem of localization. Mandarin remains the predominant language of education, but Taiwanese schools have a "mother tongue" language requirement which can be satisfied with students' choice of the mother tongue: Taiwanese, Hakka, or indigenous languages.

Although the use of Taiwanese Hokkien over Mandarin was historically part of the Taiwan independence movement, the linkage between politics and language is not as strong as it once was. Some fluency in Taiwanese Hokkien is desirable for political office in Taiwan for both independence and unificationist politicians. At the same time, even some supporters of Taiwan's independence have played down its connection with the Taiwanese in order to gain the support of the Mainlanders and Hakka people.

James Soong restricted the use of Taiwanese Hokkien and other local tongues in broadcasting while serving as Director of the Government Information Office earlier in his career, but later became one of the first politicians of Mainlander origin to use it in semi-formal occasions. Since then, politicians opposed to Taiwanese independence have used it frequently in rallies, even when they are not native speakers. Conversely, politicians who have traditionally been identified with Taiwan's independence have used Mandarin on formal occasions and semi-formal occasions such as press conferences. An example of the latter is former President Chen Shui-bian, who uses Mandarin in all official state speeches but uses mainly Taiwanese in political rallies and some informal state occasions such as New Year greetings. Former President Tsai Ing-wen was criticized by some of her supporters for not using Taiwanese in speeches. Her predecessor Ma Ying-jeou spoke in Taiwanese during his 2008 Double Ten Day speech when he was talking about the state of the economy in Taiwan.

In the early 21st century, there are few differences in language usage between the pro-unification leaning Pan-Blue Coalition and the independence leaning Pan-Green Coalition. Both tend to use Taiwanese at political rallies and sometimes in informal interviews, and both tend to use Mandarin at formal press conferences and official state functions. Both also tend to use more Mandarin in Northern Taiwan and more Taiwanese in Southern Taiwan. However, at official party gatherings (as opposed to both Mandarin-leaning state functions and Taiwanese-leaning party rallies), the DPP tends to use Taiwanese while KMT and PFP tend to use Mandarin. The Taiwan Solidarity Union, which advocates a strong line on Taiwan independence, tends to use Taiwanese even in formal press conferences. In speaking, politicians will frequently code switch. In writing, almost everyone uses vernacular Mandarin which is further from Taiwanese, and the use of semi-alphabetic writing or even colloquial Taiwanese characters is rare.

In 2002, the Taiwan Solidarity Union, a party with about 10% of the Legislative Yuan seats at the time, suggested making Taiwanese Hokkien a second official language. This proposal encountered strong opposition not only from Mainlander groups but also from Hakka and aboriginal groups who felt that it would slight their home languages, as well as others including Hoklo who objected to the proposal on logistical grounds and on the grounds that it would increase ethnic tensions. Because of these objections, support for this measure is lukewarm among moderate Taiwan independence supporters, and the proposal did not pass.

In 2003, there was a controversy when parts of the civil service examination for judges were written in characters used only in Taiwanese Hokkien. After strong objections, these questions were not used in scoring. As with the official-language controversy, objections to the use of Taiwanese came not only from Mainlander groups but also Hoklo, Hakka, and aborigines. The Control Yuan later created a rule that only allowed Standard Mandarin characters on civil service exams. According to public opinion surveys in 2008, more people supported making English a second official language than Taiwanese.

=== Mother tongue movement ===
Taiwanization developed in the 1990s into a 'mother tongue revival movement' aiming to save, preserve, and develop the local ethnic culture and language of Holo (Taiwanese), Hakka, and aborigines. The effort to save declining languages has since allowed them to revive and flourish. In 1993, Taiwan became the first country in the world to implement the teaching of Taiwanese Hokkien in schools. By 2001, Taiwanese languages such as Taiwanese Hokkien, Hakka, and indigenous languages were taught in all Taiwanese schools. Since the 2000s, elementary school students are required to take a class in their mother tongue, which can be either Taiwanese, Hakka, or aboriginal languages. In junior high this is usually an available elective. Taiwan also has its own literary circle whereby Hokkien poets and writers compose poetry and literature in Taiwanese on a regular basis.

As a result of the mother tongue movement, Taiwan has emerged as a significant cultural hub for Hokkien in the world in the 21st century. It also plans to be the major export center for Hokkien culture worldwide in the 21st century.

On December 25, 2018, the Development of National Languages Act was enacted in order to protect and support minority languages such as Taiwanese. It requires students to take classes in their mother tongue—either Taiwanese, Hakka, or aboriginal languages—from elementary school to high school. On September 1st, 2025, Beiling Elementary School in Lujhu District, Kaohsiung, officially opened as a "Taiwanese Language Experimental Elementary School". The school was the first exclusively Taiwanese-language elementary school in the country, accepting 16 students in its initial year. A Taiwanese-language radio and television station was also established.

=== Television ===
- Lady Rainicorn for Adventure Time broadcast by Cartoon Network Taiwan used Taiwanese Hokkien for Li Hanfei (李涵菲)

== Scholarship ==
Klöter's Written Taiwanese (cited below) has been described as "the most comprehensive English-language study of written Taiwanese".

== See also ==
- Languages of Taiwan
- Min Nan Wikipedia
- Speak Hokkien Campaign
- Taiwanese literature movement
- Bân-lâm-gí Gí-giân Lêng-le̍k Jīn-chèng (Taiwanese Hokkien Test) (in Min Nan Chinese)
