= Ong Iok-tek =

Ông Io̍k-tek
- 王育德
- Born: Ō Ikutoku; 30 January 1924; Tainan Prefecture, Japanese Taiwan
- Died: 9 September 1985 (aged 61); Japan
- Other name: Wang Yu-te
- Occupations: Academic, linguistic, activist
- Known for: authority on Taiwanese language

Academic background
- Education: University of Tokyo (PhD)
- Influences: Su Beng

Academic work
- Main interests: Southern Min

Ong Iok-tek (Ikutoku Ō; 王育德/王育徳; POJ: Ông Io̍k-tek; Hepburn:Ō Ikutoku: pinyin: Wáng Yùdé; Wade–Giles: Wang Yü-te; 30 January 1924–9 September 1985) was a Taiwanese scholar and early leader of the Taiwan independence movement. He is considered to be an authority on the Southern Min language family and the Taiwanese language.

He was born in Tainan Prefecture (modern-day Tainan), during Japanese rule, of a prominent family. He attended Tokyo Imperial University in 1943 but the ongoing World War II compelled him to return to Taiwan after a year. Following the war and handover of Taiwan he took a critical attitude toward the Kuomintang, one accentuated by the killing of his brother, Wang Yu-lin, a Tokyo-educated prosecutor, in the February 28 Incident. His own life threatened by the new regime, he fled to Japan in 1949 and spent the rest of his life there in addition to various other places.

He resumed his studies in May 1950, and after completing his Ph.D. in 1969 at the University of Tokyo, he later taught Taiwanese at Meiji University in 1974.

He also played a leading role in garnering support for the Taiwan independence movement within Japan. As a student he had joined Thomas Liao's Republic of Taiwan Provisional Government but became dissatisfied with it after two years. He established the Taiwan Youth Association in 1960 and published the organization's influential monthly Taiwan Seinen in Japanese (later for a time in Chinese) and Formosan Quarterly in English. The Taiwan Youth Association later changed its name to the Taiwan Youth Independence League. In the 1970s he was a leader in the campaign to secure compensation for the 200,000 Taiwanese who had served as soldiers under the Imperial Japanese military. In 1982 he served as a committee member of the Formosan Association for Public Affairs.

Ong argued that Han people were a folk, and not a nation, and that Hakka and Hoklos are smaller folks within the Han. Ong further argued that after Japan modernized Taiwan, the Taiwanese nation was established with Taiwan being pre-national as the Japanese ruled it, and that modern capitalism creates a nation. Ong argued that Taiwanese people can become a nation within the state container if Taiwan becomes an independent state. Shaojin Chai, author of Taiwanese Nationalism: Situation Dependency and Elite Games, said that Ong's view of a nation is that it is "the modern construction of state" and that his concept "responded to the modernity of nationalism". Chai added that "Ong's Taiwanese nationalism theory indicates that nationalism precedes nation, and without a state, there could be no nation." Chai added that Ong and Thomas Liao were both perceived as Mainlanders in Taiwan and Chinese people in Mainland China, and hence were viewed as oppressors of Taiwanese people and non-Taiwanese. Chai explained that Ong placed emphasis on the "political construction" while Liao placed emphasis on "primordial criteria".

In regards to reception to Ong's ideas, Chai said that Taiwanese people at the time of Ong's active period did believe they were a folk of Han people, even though they did have a strong provincial identity. Chai added that "Ong's argument was especially convincing to Holos [sic], but it is problematic when applied to indigenous peoples. Following his rationale, the different indigenous tribes also have to [sic] right to build their state to form their own nations."
