= Oak Poetry Society =

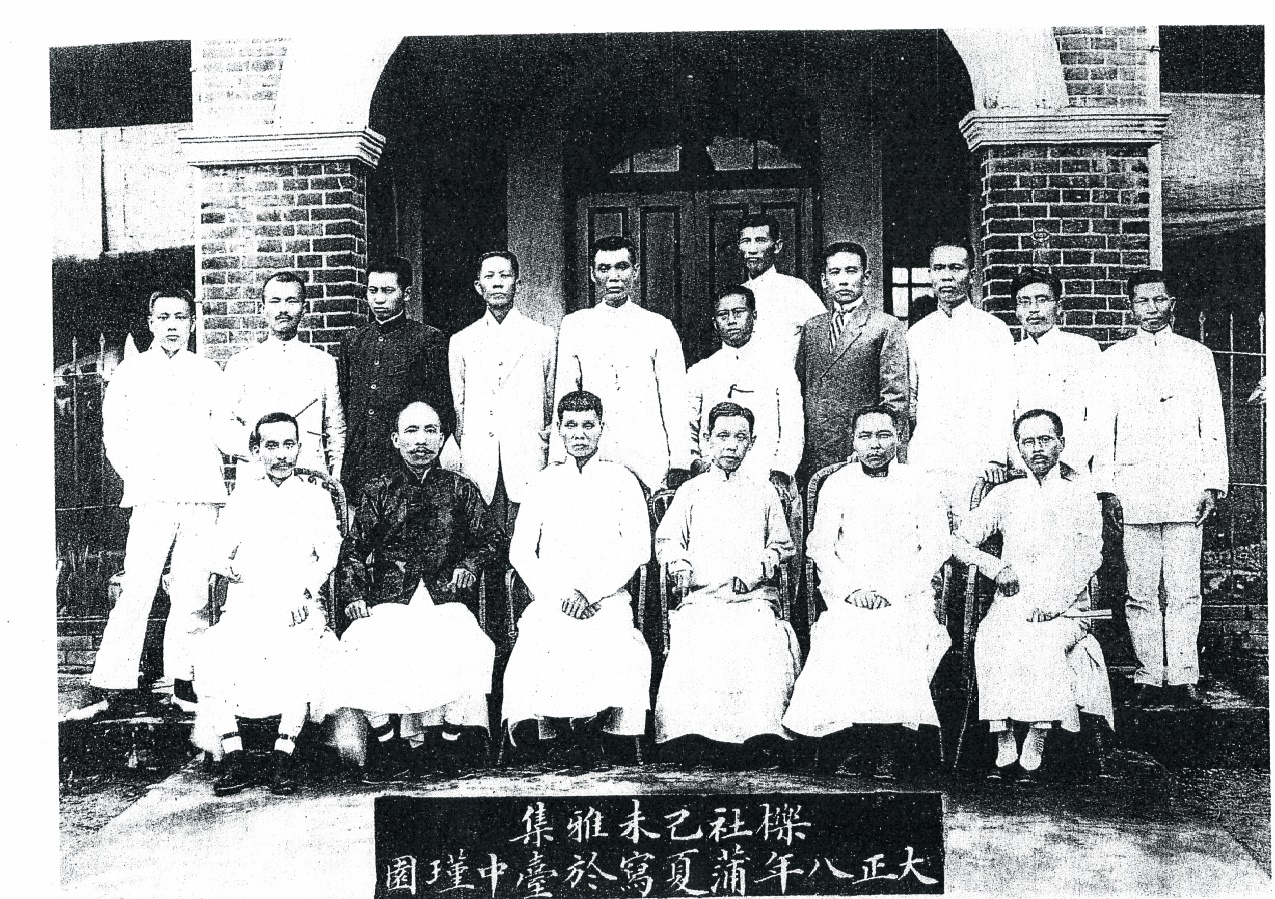
- A commemorative group photo of the Oak Poetry Society in 1919.
- Hàn-jī: 櫟社
- Pe̍h-ōe-jī: Le̍k-siā
- Tâi-lô: Li̍k-siā

The Oak Poetry Society (Chinese: 櫟社), a classical poetry society in central Taiwan, was one of the three major poetry societies during the Japanese rule of Taiwan, and actively participated in cultural movements. Its key members were also involved in social affairs, for example, joining the Taiwan Parliament Establishment Petition Movement, facilitating the establishment of the Taiwanese Cultural Association, and launching the publication of the Taiwan Youth Journal. In 1919, they founded the Taiwan Literary Arts Magazine and made significant contributions to literature and social development.

== History ==
The Oak Poetry Society was founded in 1902 by Lin Chih-hsien (林癡仙), Lin Yu-chun (林幼春), and Lai Shao-yao (賴紹堯) in Wufeng, Taichung, taking its name from the Chinese character "櫟" (oak), meaning "useless wood", in Chuang-Tzu (莊子), symbolizing "usefulness of the useless". It flourished in 1910–1930. Its activities gradually declined due to political and societal changes after World War II, which further caused the decline of the poetry society.

The Oak Poetry Society held regular gatherings throughout the year, such as spring and autumn meetings and general assemblies. In its early years, society members interacted and connected with each other regularly through various gatherings, like conventions, small meet-ups, and monthly poetry gathering (月課) to improvise poetry in various forms according to the theme of the month. However, due to difficulties with conventions in its later years, monthly poetry became irregular, and occasional small gatherings were used for interaction.

The society also published numerous publications, including the First Collection of the Oak Poetry Society and the Second Collection of the Oak Poetry Society, which featured poems by its members.

== See also ==
- Nan Poetry Society
- Wu Tzu-yü
