= Tale of the Lychee Mirror =

The Tale of the Lychee Mirror (traditional Chinese: 荔鏡記; simplified Chinese: 荔镜记; pinyin: Lì jìng jì; Pe̍h-ōe-jī: Nāi-kèng-kì, Lē-kèng-kì, Nūi-kiàⁿ-kì), also widely known as Dang San and Ngou Nio (陳三五娘, literally meaning the story of the third son of the Dang family and the fifth daughter of the Ng family), is a cornerstone of traditional Teochew opera (潮劇) and Southern Min culture. The play can be traced back to at least 1566 (Ming dynasty), and the author is unknown. It is one of the oldest surviving vernacular scripts in the Teochew Min dialect.

== History ==
The play was written in a mixture of the Southern Min dialects of Quanzhou and Chaozhou (Teochew), and is one of the earliest sources on those dialects. The oldest extant manuscripts date from 1566 and 1581.

This story is widely spread in Minnan-speaking areas, mainly the south part of Fujian, Chaoshan (Chaozhou, Jieyang and Shantou), Southeast Asia and Taiwan. Tân Saⁿ and Gǒ͘-niû (traditional Chinese: 陳三五娘; simplified Chinese: 陈三五娘; pinyin: Chén Sān Wǔniáng; Pe̍h-ōe-jī: Tân-saⁿ-Gǒ͘-niû; Teochew: Dang^{5} San^{1} Ngou^{6} Niê^{5}) is a popular Taiwanese opera adaptation based on the play.

== Story ==
Tân Saⁿ (Tan) is a scholar who is native to Quanzhou in southern Fujian province. When he sent his brother- and sister-in-law to Guangnan, he stopped in Chaozhou. During the Lantern Festival, Tan met Ngou Nie (Ngou) by chance and they fell in love with one another. Lim, a local rich man's son, also saw Ngou in the lantern show, and he was shocked by Ngou's beauty. So Lim asked for a blind date and sent a lot of bride-price to Ngou's house, because he wanted to marry Ngou. Ngou's father was greedy so he agreed to Lim's proposal. Ngou did not want to obey her father's decision but she was obligated to, so she fell into deep sorrow.

In June, Ngou went to the embroidery room (繡樓) accompanied by her maidservant, Ang. At that time, Tan returned to Chaozhou seeking Ngou. They recognized one another in the long distance and were filled with all kinds of emotions. Ngou threw her handkerchief with lychee to Tan to show her own feeling. Tan was very excited and then he came up with an idea to go to Ngou's house to see her again.

Several days later, Tan, disguised himself as a traveling mirror polisher to gain entry to the Ngou family mansion. While polishing the family's "treasure mirror" (a priceless heirloom), he deliberately broke it. So he could sell himself to Ngou's family as a servant to compensate the mirror. Ngou guessed Tan's motive so she was very happy but worried. She could not deny the marriage with Lim and stay with Tan forever.

A year later, Tan still could not know what Ngou's mind exactly. He was so disappointed that he decided to return to Quanzhou. Ang asked the reasons then she sent a letter written by Tan to Ngou. After reading his letter, Ngou was very moved and met Tan alone. They loved each other deeply and decided to stay with each other no matter how hard the difficulties were. Lim could not wait to marry Ngou, so he asked Ngou to marry him within three days. Tan and Ngou had no choice but to escape from Chaozhou to Quanzhou.

== Cultural Significance ==
It is celebrated as the first major work of vernacular literature written in Southern Min, providing invaluable data for linguists studying the history of the Teochew and Hokkien languages. The play is a classic "scholar and beauty" (才子佳人, in Teochew pronunciation: cai5zi2 gia1nang5) romance that critiques forced marriages and celebrates personal agency and cleverness. This is a cultural heritage shared by the region. Although it is a classic repertoire of Teochew Opera, it is equally important in Liyuan Opera (梨園戲) and Taiwanese opera (歌仔戲), symbolizing the shared cultural roots of the Minnan-speaking people.

In January 1921, Japanese writer Haruo Sato published his first work after his trip to Taiwan and Fujian under the title "Huang Wu Niang" (黃五娘). He later republished it in March under the title "Star". "Star" is a rewrite of the famous Minnan legend Tale of the Lychee Mirror that Sato Haruo heard during his travels in Zhangzhou.

In the Tale of the Lychee Mirror, the themes of freely pursuing love and breaking away from the constraints of arranged marriage are characteristic of Ming‑dynasty vernacular drama. Because the plot openly defies ritual propriety and challenges feudal marital norms, the play was repeatedly banned by authorities during the Ming and Qing periods. Despite official suppression, the story remained immensely popular in Minnan‑speaking regions, where it circulated widely and gave rise to the proverb: "Better to elope with Chen San than marry a pig or a dog" (嫁豬嫁狗，不如佮陳三走). This saying reflects the public’s admiration for the character of Chen San and expresses disdain for arranged marriages brokered by parents or matchmakers. It symbolizes a woman’s desire for autonomy in choosing her partner—preferring to elope with the man she truly loves rather than submit to an unwanted marriage with a wealthy stranger. In traditional Minnan usage, "pig" and "dog" represent a potential husband chosen by the parents or matchmaker. This person is someone the woman has never met, is usually older, plain-looking, and most importantly, she does not love him.
