= Taivoan Night Ceremony =

Taivoan ceremonial ritual

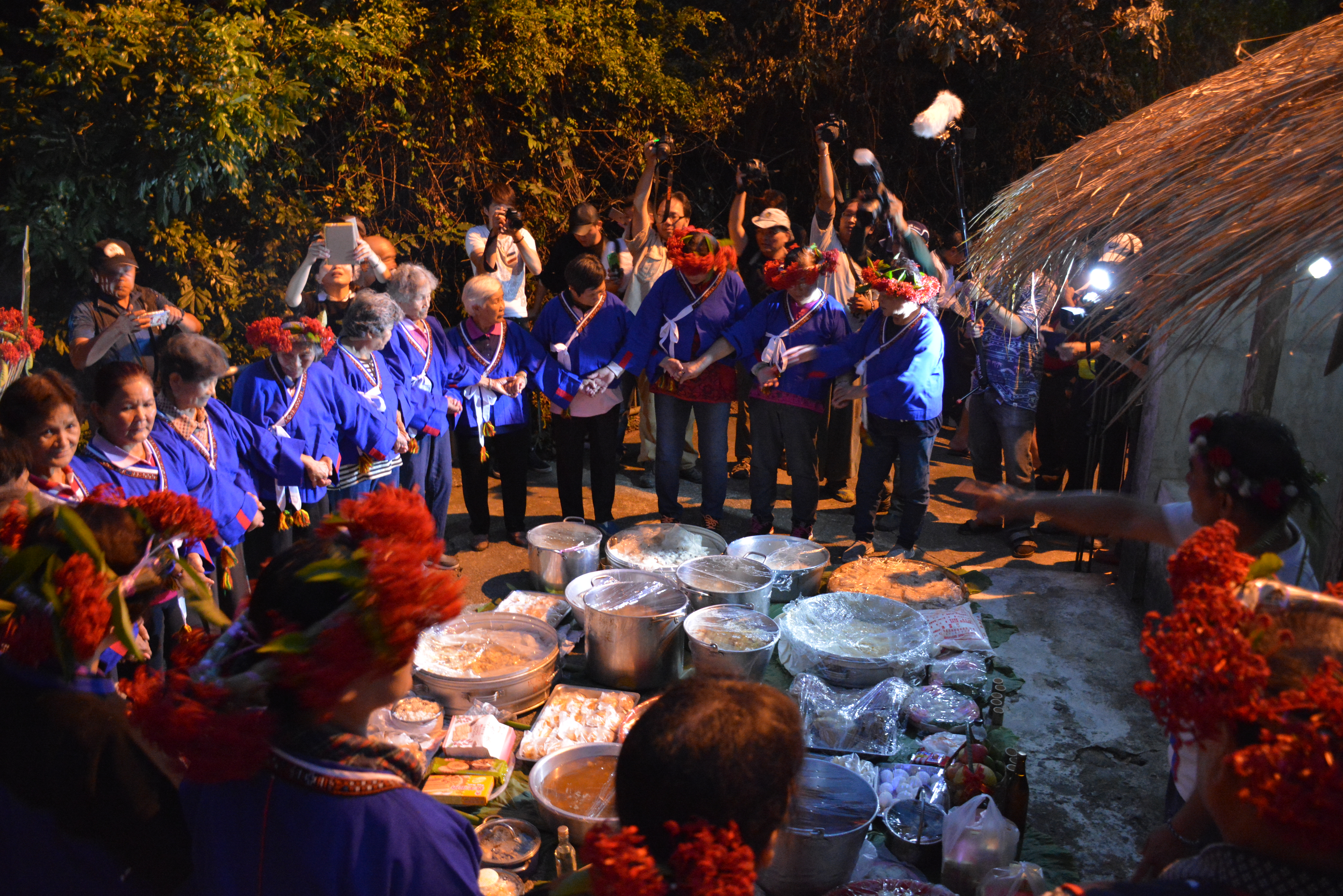
The Taivoan Night Ceremony in Alikuan.

The Taivoan Night Ceremony (Taivoan: Taai, Taa) is one of the most important annual ceremonial rituals of the Taivoan, a plain indigenous people in Taiwan. It is held on September 15th of the lunar calendar in various Taivoan communities such as Siaolin and Rauron in Kaohsiung, and Dazhuang in Hualien. Additionally, the Liuchongxi community in Tainan conducts it a day earlier on September 14th, and the Liouguei community in Kaohsiung holds the ceremony on October 6th.

The Taivoan Night Ceremony in Liuchongxi, along with four other Siraya Night Ceremonies in Tainan — Beitouyang, Kabuasua, Fuxing Palace, and Danei Toushe – are collectively known as the "Five Night Ceremonies" in the Tainan area.

== Origin ==
The Anping County Miscellaneous Records (安平縣雜記) written in the late Qing dynasty has arguably the earliest and the most complete of the Night Ceremony of the Taivoan people, related to the ritual Khui-Hiàng:

According to their customs, every year, the restriction period is set from the 15th day of the third month, Kìm-Hiàng (禁向, literally "the Period of Restriction"), to the 15th day of the ninth month, Khui-Hiàng (開向, literally "the Period of Permission"), in the lunar calendar. [...] At that time, regardless of whether it was the period of restriction or permission, it was customary to kill a person as an offering, beheading and scraping the bones for sacrifice. However, when the Qing government became aware of this practice, they issued a decree strictly forbidding it, permitting only hunting of animals and prohibiting the killing of people. Since then, only the unassimilated indigenous people continued the practice of human sacrifice, while the assimilated indigenous people solely hunted animals. Following the Period of Restriction, both men and women had to focus on farming, without engaging in hunting, dancing, or singing, and they were also not allowed to marry, although engagements were permitted. If these prohibitions were violated, the family's entire crop yield was doomed to failure. After the Period of Permission began, hunting, dancing, singing, and marrying were allowed.

According to the records, the Taivoan Night Ceremony is related to the restriction and permission of daily activities like hunting, dancing, singing, and marriage. As it's common for Taiwanese indigenous people to practice hunting in winter, the Night Ceremony could be the effort for the people to main the life philosophy of living in harmony with the universe and all beings.

== Cultural significance ==
=== The Shrine ===
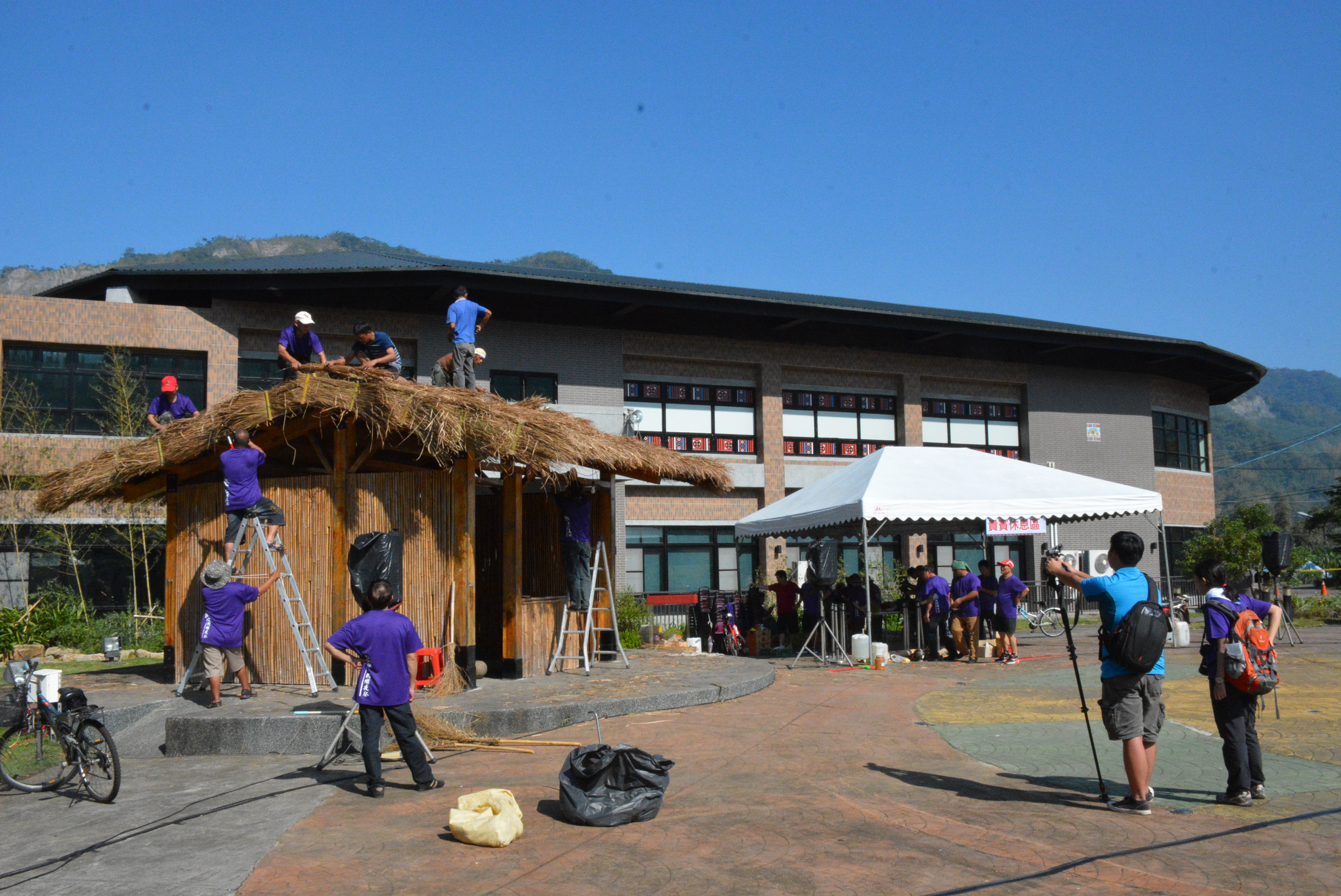
Taivoan men are renovating the roof of the Public Hall in the morning of the Night Ceremony.

The Public Hall or the Shrine (Taivoan: Kuba; Taiwanese: Kong-kài) of the Taivoan, currently used for rituals, houses Kogitanta Agisen, the seat of the spirits, representing the presence of the highest ancestral spirits of Taivoan.

=== Erecting the Ritual Bamboo ===
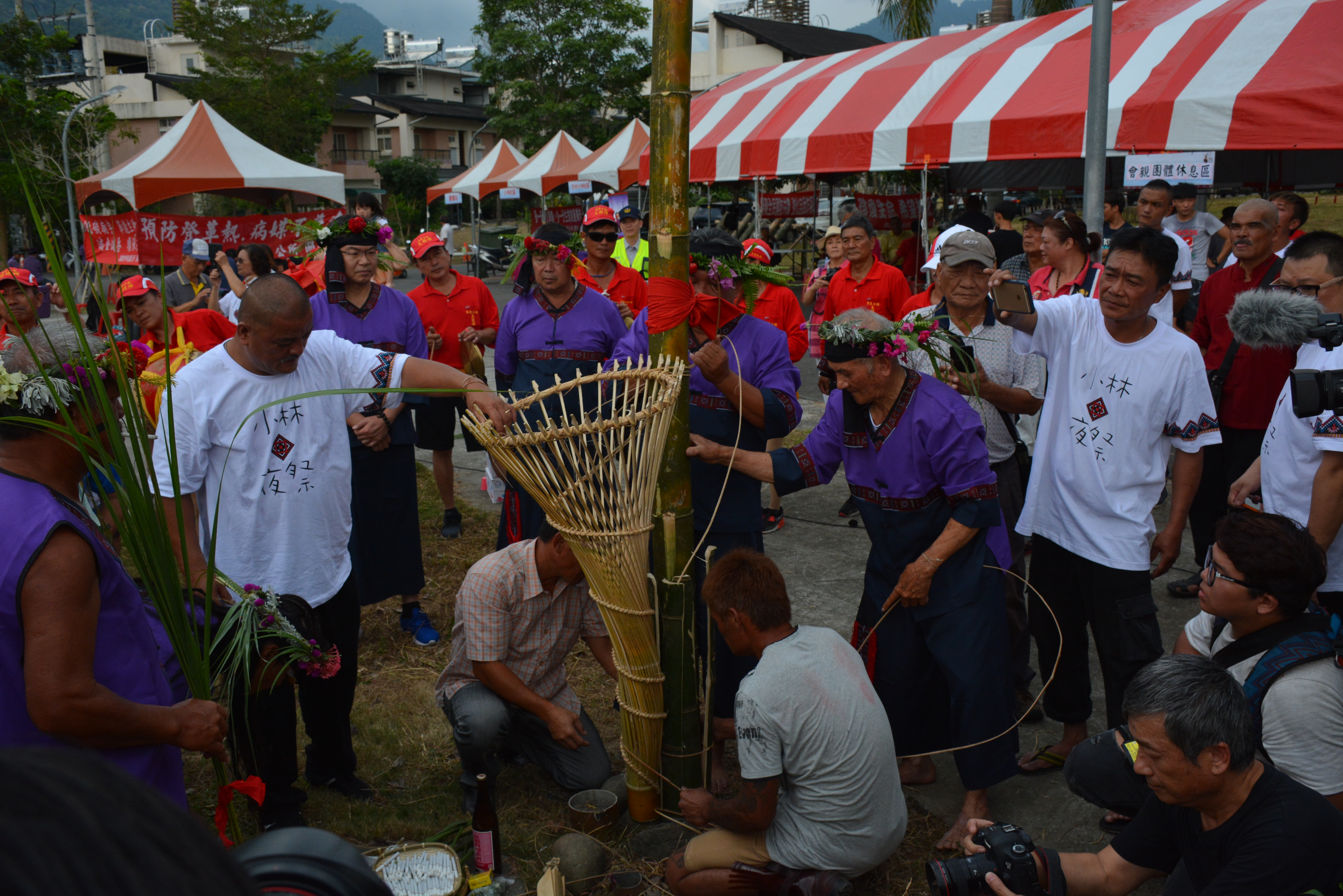
The ritual of erecting the Ritual Bamboo in Siaolin.

In Taivoan communities like Siaolin and Alikuan, the Malubiw or the erection of the Ritual Bamboo is a ritual conducted in the afternoon of the Night Ceremony. To prepare for this ritual, an elder from the family responsible for the Ritual Bamboo chooses a long thorny bamboo with its tip facing east ahead of the Night Ceremony. In the early morning of the ceremony, men from this family follow the elder to the bamboo site, cut it down, and bring it back to the ritual site. The tips of the Ritual Bamboo are left intact with thin bamboo and bamboo leaves, and a bundle of thatch is then tied to them, symbolizing the head of the enemy in the past. Seven evenly spaced bundles of thatch are also tied along the bamboo body, representing ladders for the seven Highest Ancestral Spirits to descend to the ritual site from the heaven.

In the afternoon, the indigenous people dig a hole at a designated spot and erect the Ritual Bamboo together. After the bamboo is erected, bamboo cannons are lit, marking the beginning of the ceremony.

=== Worshiping the Highest Ancestral Spirits ===
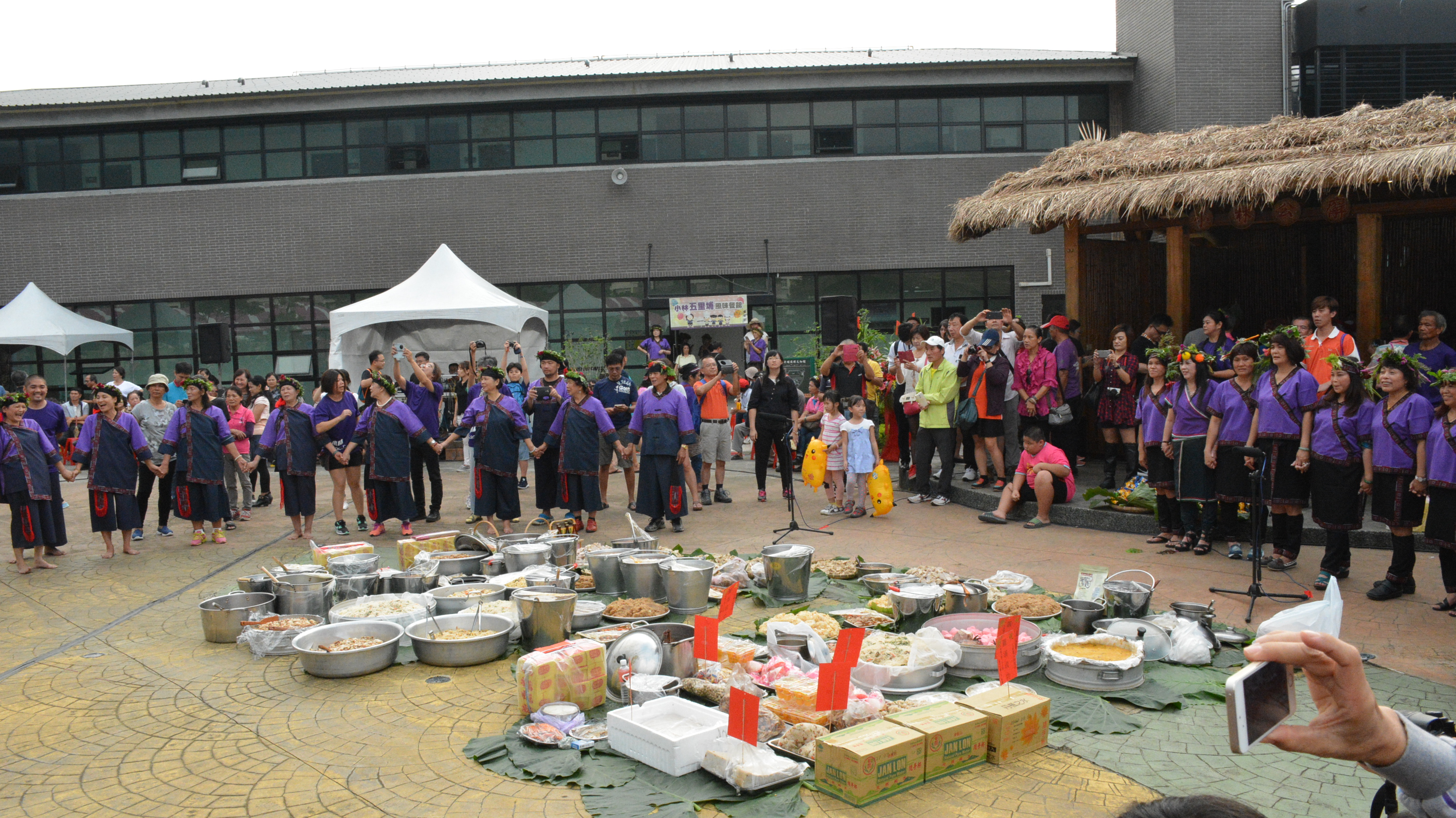
Taivoan people report the sacrificial offerings to the spirits in front of the Public Hall in Siaolin.

The Taivoan people prepare offerings such as mai (sticky rice cake), mochi, wine-cooked chicken soup, betel nuts, joss paper, wine, cigarettes, pork, etc., for sacrifice at the Public Hall.

During the sacrifice, the elders chant ancient songs, "Panga" (also known as the Song of Offerings or "O I Hei") and "Taboro", to report the sacrificial offerings to the Highest Ancestral Spirits. Some of the lyrics are as follows:

Ho i he, rarom mahanru ho i he, rarom taipanga ho i he.

Ho i he, hahu mahanru ho i he, hahu taipanga ho i he.

Ho i he, hana mahanru ho i he, hana taipanga ho i he.

Ho i he, i saviki mahanru ho i he, saviki taipanga ho i he.

Ho i he, i luku mahanru ho i he, tuku taipanga ho i he.

Ho i he, agagang mahanru ho i he, agagang taipanga ho i he.

Ho i he, i tamaku mahanru ho i he, tamaku taipanga ho i he.

Ho i he, babuy mahanru ho i he, babuy taipanga ho i he.

Ho i he, takuka mahanru ho i he, takuka taipanga ho i he.

Ho i he, mapuli mahanru ho i he, mapuli taipanga ho i he.

Ho i he, tao mahanru ho i he, tao taipanga ho i he.

== Songs ==
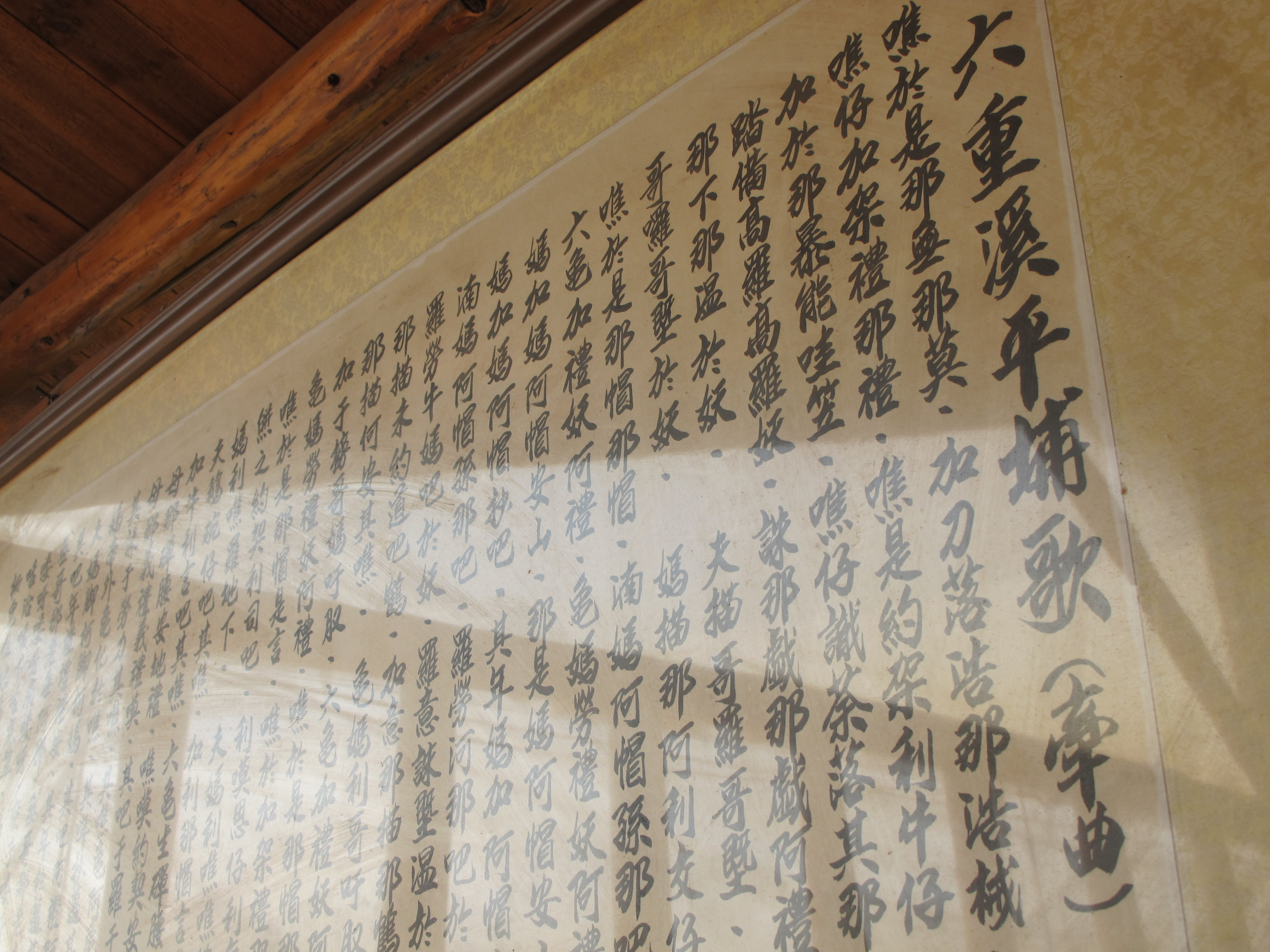
The lyrics of a Taivoan Night Ceremony's ritual song in Liuchongxi, transcribed in Chinese characters.

According to the scholar Lin Ch'ing-ts'ai (2000), the current ritual songs of the Night Ceremony of various Taivoan communities are similar to some of the Siraya communities' ritual songs. However, their origin lies in the songs of the Taivoan communities in the Yujing Basin. Over the past several hundred years, as the Taivoan people migrated, these songs spread to areas such as Liuchongxi in Tainan, the mountain regions of Kaohsiung, and the Huadong Valley, and eventually to the Siraya communities.

Based on field research by Lin Ch'ing-ts'ai and anthropologist Pan Ing-hai, around 1922, the Highest Ancestral Spirit of the Danei Toushe community in Tainan helped a resident, Yang Wang, win a lawsuit. To fulfill the vow, Yang, through his wife Mao Lai-chih (a Taivoan medium of the Kaohsiung Rauron community), visited Rauron and learned the local "Indigenous Dance", and brought it back to Toushe to teach the villagers, recording it in Mandarin phonetics, spreading the Taivoan ritual songs to Siraya communities.

In 1915, the outbreak of the Tapani Incident in Kaohsiung led some of the Rauron Taivoan people to flee to Liuchongxi, where the ritual songs were once again spread to the Liuchongxi community.

== See also ==
- Taivoan people
- Kong-kài
