= Liouguei District, Kaohsiung =

District in Kaohsiung, Taiwan

Coordinates: 22.996955°N 120.648315°E

Liouguei 六龜區 Lakuri, Liukuei, Liugui
- District
- Liouguei District
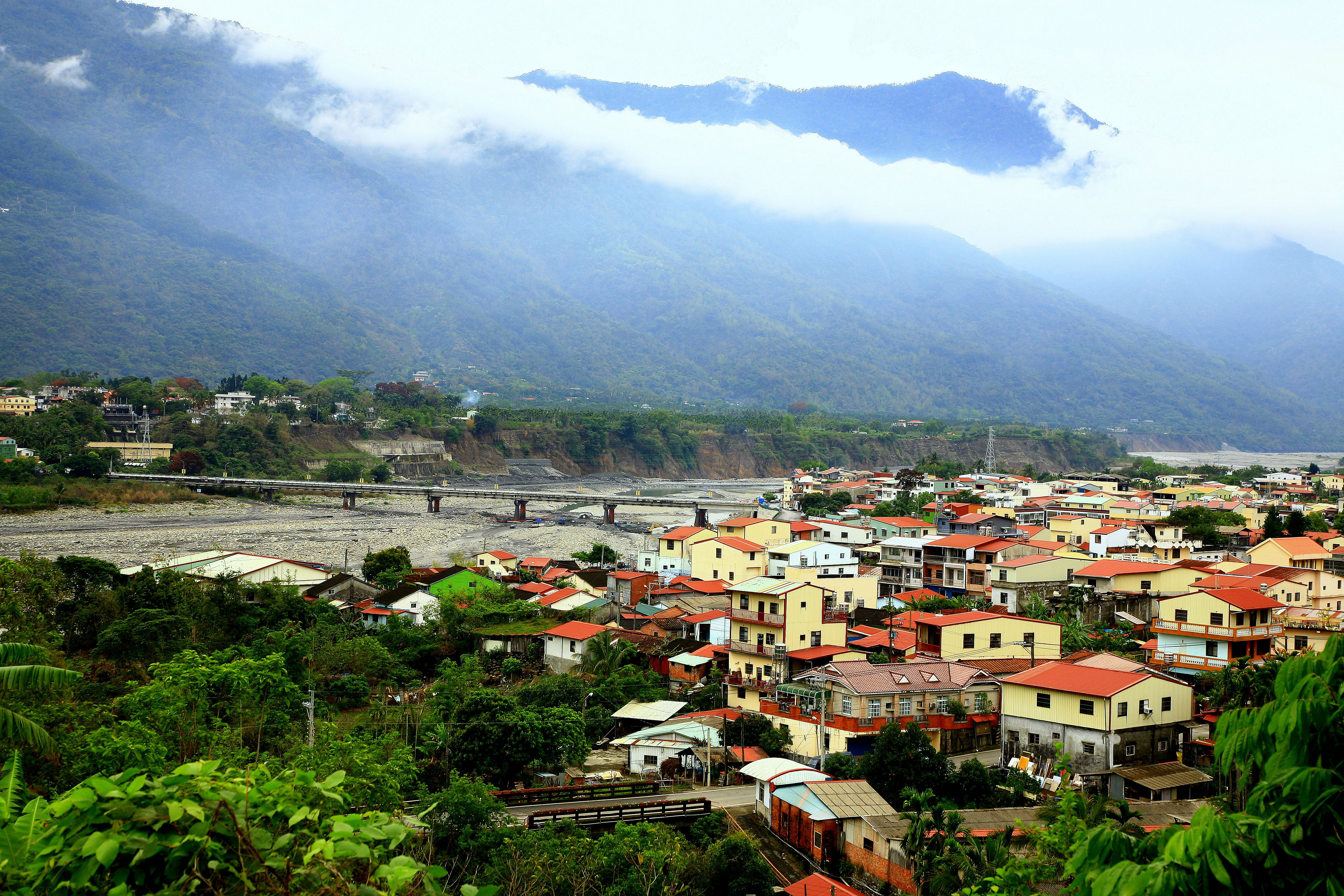

- 高雄市六龜區公所; Liouguei District Office Kaohsiung City

- Liouguei District in Kaohsiung City
- Country: Taiwan
- Region: Southern Taiwan

Population (October 2023)
  - Total: 11,722
- Website: liouguei-en.kcg.gov.tw

Liouguei District (Taivoan: Lakuri; Chinese: 六龜區; Hanyu Pinyin: Liùguī Qū; Tongyong Pinyin: Liòuguei Cyu; Wade–Giles: Liu^{4}-kuei^{1} Ch'ü^{1}) is a rural district of Kaohsiung City, Taiwan. It is the third largest district in Kaohsiung City after Tauyuan District and Namasia District. The place-name is derived from the name of a Taivoan community Lakuri or Lakkuli, which emigrated from Vogavon in Tainan, driven to Kaohsiung by the invasion of Han immigrants and Siraya in the late 17th century.

The residents of this district are mainly Hakka (about 44%) and Hoklo Taiwanese, as well as indigenous peoples and immigrants from other China provinces. The entire region has been included in the Maolin National Scenic Area. In recent years, the tourism industry has flourished.

== History ==
Due to the invasion of Han in the 17th century, Siraya that originally lived in the plains of Tainan was forced to migrate to Yuchin Basin, which in turn drove Taivoan from Vogavon to Pangliao, Kaohsiung in 1781, reaching nowadays Liouguei in 1799, founding community Lakkuli (Chinese: 六龜里社; Pe̍h-ōe-jī: La̍k-ku-lí-siā), also spelled Lakuri or La-ko-li.

In 1902, during early Japanese rule, the area was administered as "Lakkuli Village" (六龜里庄). In 1910, it was reorganized as Rokkiri Subprefecture (Japanese: 六龜里支廳), Akō Prefecture (阿緱廳). In 1920, it became Rokuki Village (六龜庄), under Heitō District (屏東郡), Takao Prefecture. In 1932, Rokuki was annexed into Kizan District (旗山郡) under Takao Prefecture.

After the handover of Taiwan from Japan to the Republic of China in 1945, Liouguei was incorporated into Kaohsiung County as a rural township. On 25 December 2010, the township became a district of Kaohsiung City.

In 1964, Baptist educator and preacher Yang Hsu and his wife Lin Feng-ying formally established the Liouguei Mountain Children's Home for orphans.

In August 2019, some residents living in high-risk areas of Liouguei District were evacuated from their homes after heavy rain and flash flooding.

== Geology ==
The district resembles the shape of long gourd with a vertical length of 36 km and a horizontal width of 5 km. The Laonong River passes from north to south through the center of the township.

== Administrative divisions ==
The district consists of Sinwei/Xinwei, Xinxing, Xinliao, Xinfa, Laonong, Liouguei, Yibao, Xinglong, Zhongxing, Baolai, Wenwu and Dajin Villages.

== Economy ==
During Japanese rule, the district was known for the production of Camphor oil. The Japanese government constructed a route and tunnels to facilitate the transportation of the product.

== Culture ==
Liouguei comprises mainly Hakka, Chinese mainlanders, plain indigenous people, and mountain indigenous people. The Hakka community is primarily located in the areas of Xinliao, Xinwei, and Xinxing near the Liouguei Tunnel, with most of them originating from the Meinong area and maintaining close connections and intermarriages with neighboring regions. The population of Chinese mainlanders mostly consists of retired soldiers and their descendants who stayed behind after the construction of the Southern Cross-Island Highway, mainly residing in the areas of Zhongxing and Wenwu. The plain indigenous group Taivoan is scattered across several villages, and the mountain indigenous people have migrated from nearby mountainous areas.

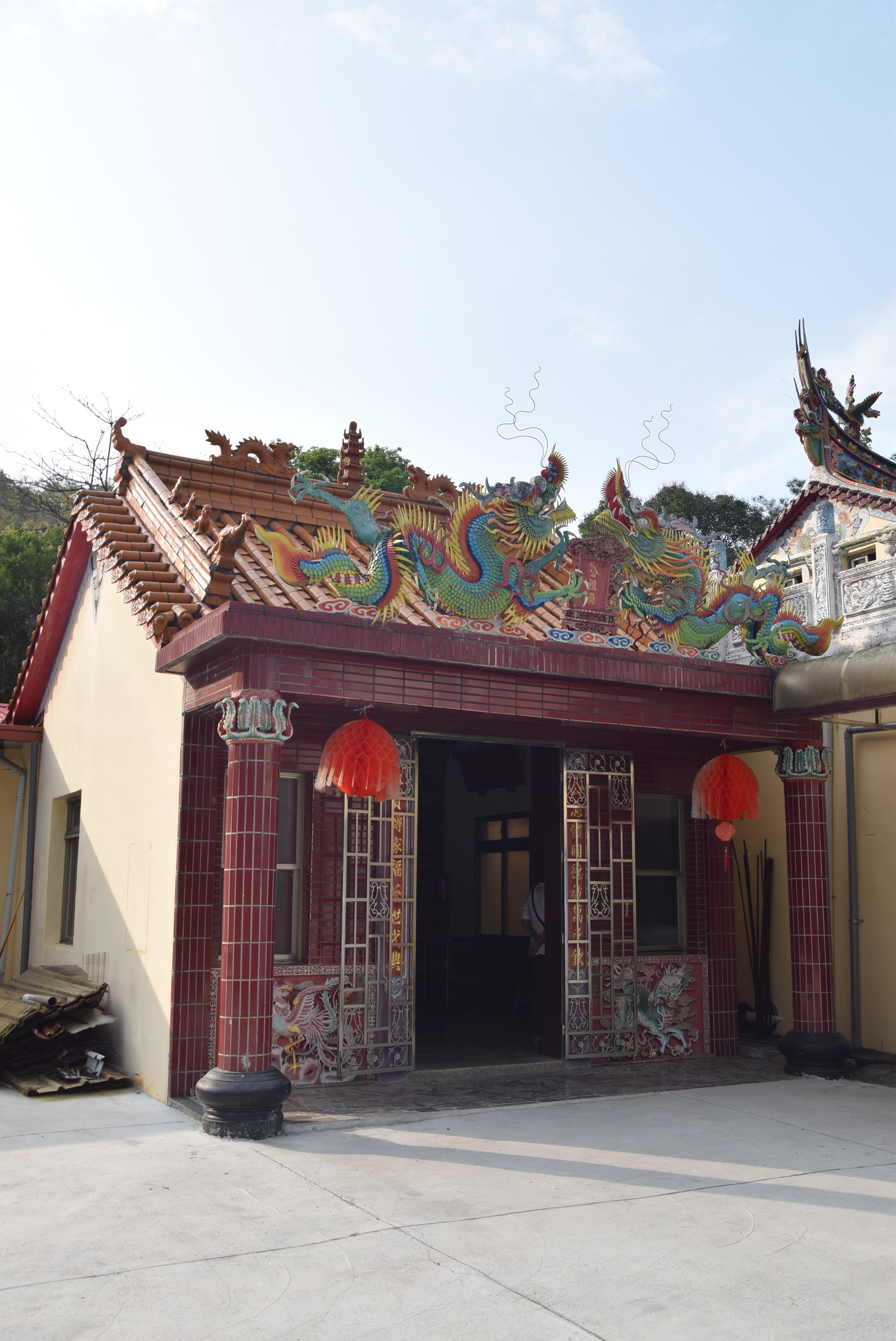
Taivoan Public Hall in Liouguei community.

=== Taivoan ===
The Night Ceremony and the Public Hall Kong-kài in Liouguei and Laonong are significant markers of the Taivoan people's culture in the district. According to local records, thousands of years ago, when the ancestors of the indigenous people encountered a typhoon during their sea voyage to Taiwan, it was the highest ancestral spirit, Hagan, who appeared and led them to land safely on the island. This was the beginning of the people's worship of the spirit in Kong-kài.

== Tourist attractions ==
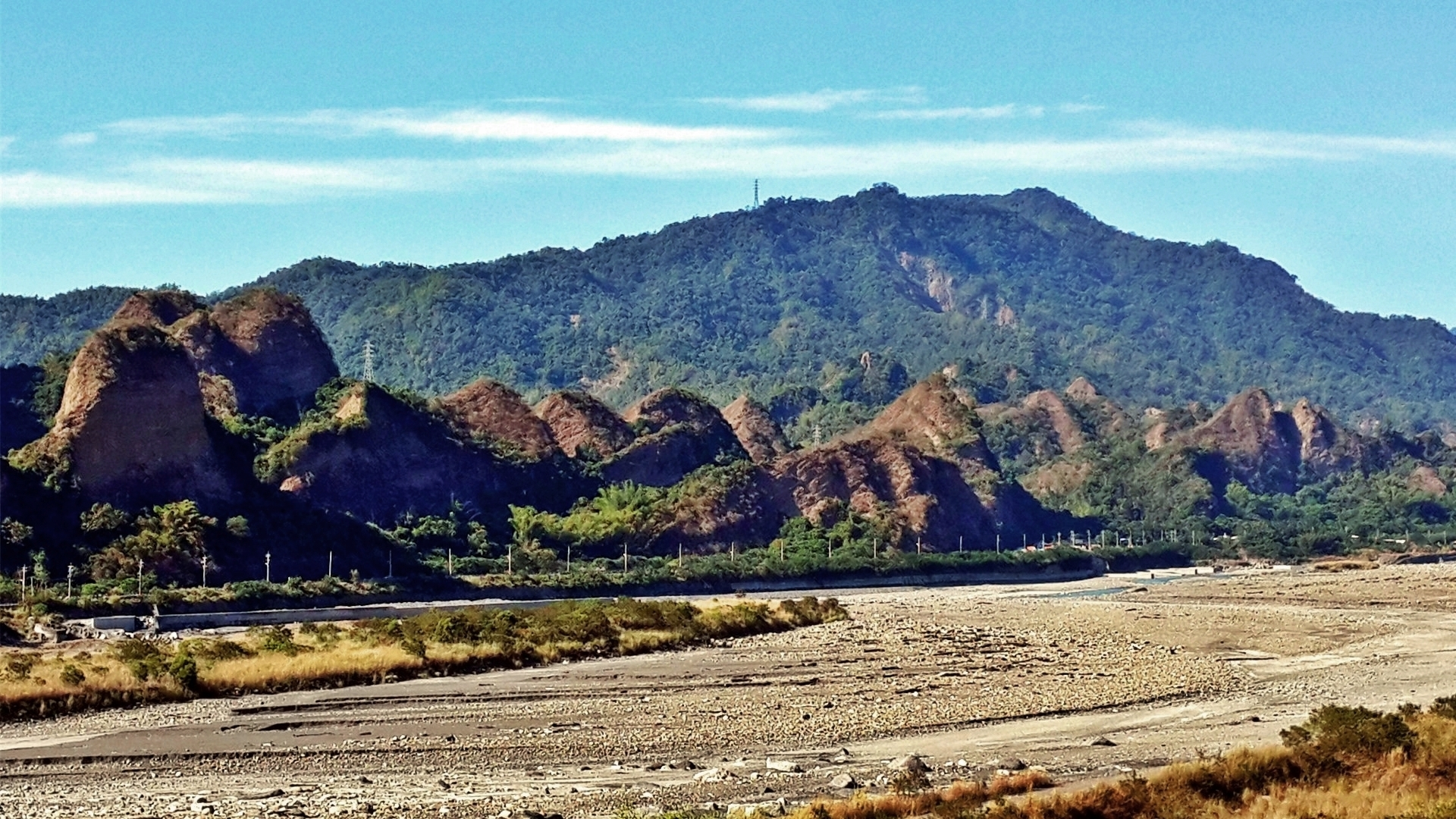
18 Arhats Mountain

- Baolai Spring Park
- Bulao Hot Spring
- Jinlongshan Cihui Temple (金龍山慈惠堂)
- Liouguei Tunnels
- Maolin National Scenic Area
- 18 Arhats Mountain
- Sinwei Forest Ecological Park
- Taivoan Night Ceremony

== Agricultural Products ==
- "Black Diamond" Wax Jambu (Syzygium samarangense)
- Jinhuang Mango
- Jinxuan Oolong Tea
- Jujube

== Transportation ==
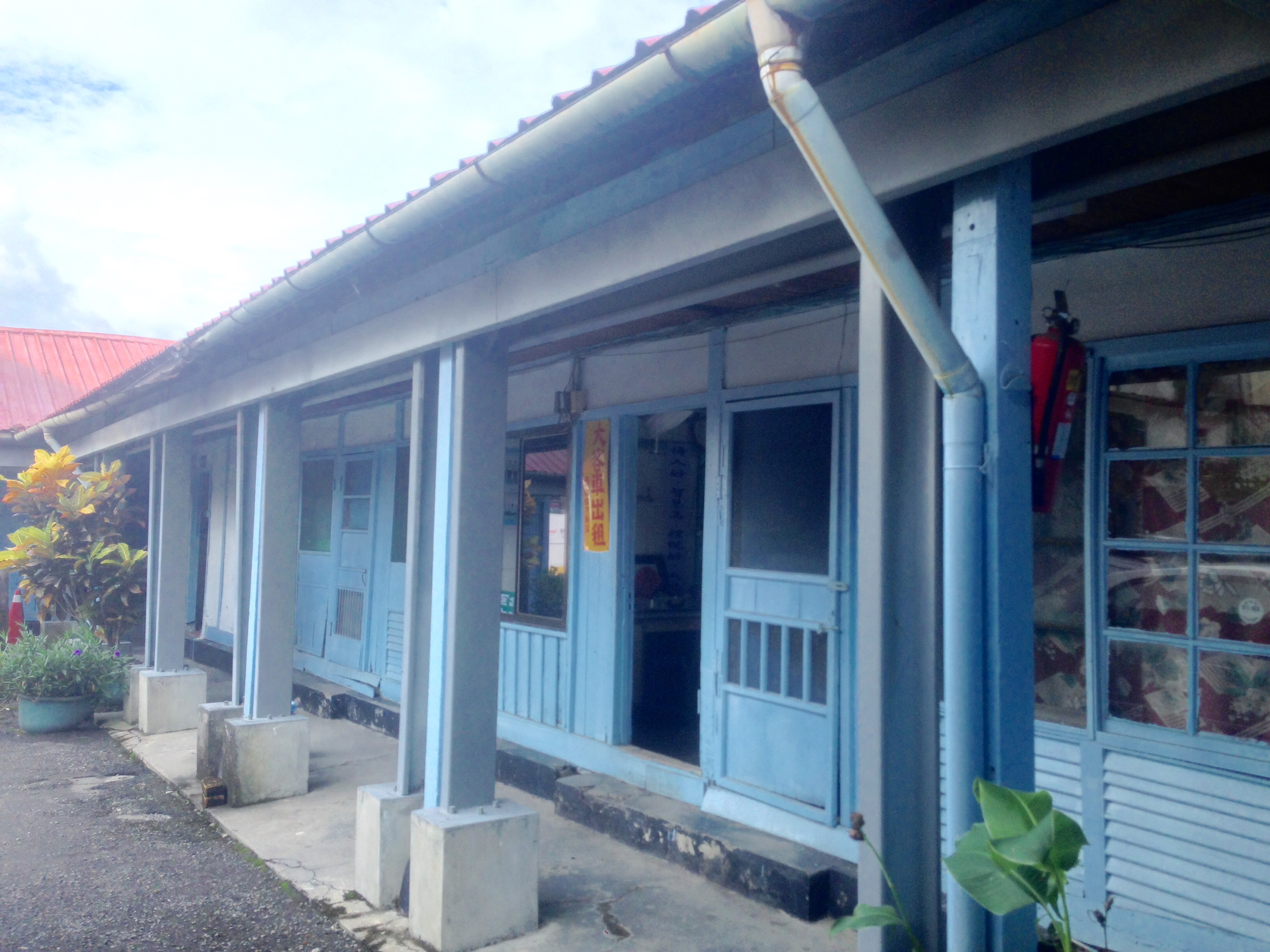
Liouguei Bus Station

- Liouguei Bus Station

== See also ==
- Kaohsiung
