= Liouguei Tunnels =

Tunnels in Liugui, Kaohsiung, Taiwan

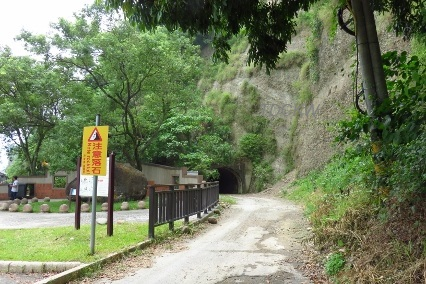
- Interactive map of Liouguei Tunnels

Overview
- Official name: 六龜隧道
- Location: Liouguei, Kaohsiung, Taiwan
- Coordinates: 22°56′39.8″N 120°38′04.5″E

Operation
- Opened: 1937
- Closed: 1992
- Reopened: September 2017

Technical
- Length: 792 m (2,598 ft)

The Liouguei Tunnels (traditional Chinese: 六龜隧道; simplified Chinese: 六龟隧道; Hanyu Pinyin: Liùguī Suìdào; Tongyong Pinyin: Liòuguei Suèidào) are six tunnels in Liouguei District, Kaohsiung, Taiwan.

== History ==
The tunnels were originally constructed during the Japanese rule of Taiwan during the road construction in 1937 to facilitate the transportation of Camphor and logs from the region. The tunnels were later abandoned in 1992 after the completion of Provincial Highway 27A. In September 2017, the Forestry Bureau reopened three tunnels to visitors.

== Ecology ==
The tunnels are currently inhabited by bats and swallows.

== Technical specifications ==
The tunnels have a total combined length of 792 meters.

== See also ==
- List of tourist attractions in Taiwan
