= Baolai Spring Park =

Hot spring in Liugui, Kaohsiung, Taiwan

- 寶來溫泉公園
- Location within Kaohsiung
- Interactive map of Baolai Spring Park
- Location: Liouguei, Kaohsiung, Taiwan
- Coordinates: 23°06′27.2″N 120°42′12.3″E
- Elevation: 550 m (1,800 ft)
- Type: hot spring
- Temperature: 52 °C (126 °F)

The Baolai Spring Park (traditional Chinese: 寶來溫泉公園; simplified Chinese: 宝来温泉公园; pinyin: Bǎolái Wēnquán Gōngyuán) is a hot spring in Baolai Village, Liouguei District, Kaohsiung, Taiwan.

== History ==
The hot spring area was developed in the early 1980s when pipes were laid to channel the spring water to Baolai Village. In August 2009, Typhoon Morakot hit the area and caused the source for the hot spring to disappear. The hot spring park was opened on 23 December 2017.

== Geology ==
The park consists of hot spring with a temperature goes up to 52°C with pH 7.2. The park covers a total area of 5.4 hectares. The area is located at an altitude of 550 meters above sea level. It is located inside a mountain forest along the Laonong River. The water originates from the Baolai Valley, around 2.5 km away from the hot springs area.

== Facilities ==
Area around the hot spring is filled with various hotels and resorts, as well as camping grounds and barbecue.

== Transportation ==
The hot spring is accessible by bus from Kaohsiung Main Station or Zuoying HSR station.

== See also ==
- Taiwanese hot springs
