= Bulao Hot Spring =

Hot spring in Liugui, Kaohsiung, Taiwan

- 不老溫泉
- Location within Kaohsiung
- Interactive map of Bulao Hot Spring
- Location: Luigui, Kaohsiung, Taiwan
- Coordinates: 23°03′59.2″N 120°41′06.2″E
- Elevation: 550 m (1,800 ft)
- Type: hot spring
- Temperature: 60 °C (140 °F)

The Bulao Hot Spring (traditional Chinese: 不老溫泉; simplified Chinese: 不老温泉; pinyin: Bùlǎo Wēnquán) is a hot spring in Xinfa Village, Luigui District, Kaohsiung, Taiwan.

== History ==
The hot spring was developed during the Japanese rule of Taiwan.

== Geology ==
The hot spring is located next to Laonong River at an altitude of 550 meters. The water has pH level of 7–7.5 with a 48–60°C temperature.

== Architecture ==
The area around the hot spring is filled with various hotels and resorts.

== Transportation ==
The hot spring is accessible by bus from Kaohsiung Main Station or Zuoying HSR station.

== See also ==
- Taiwanese hot springs
