= Liouguei Bus Station =

Bus station in Liugui, Kaohsiung, Taiwan

Liouguei Bus Station 高雄客運六龜站
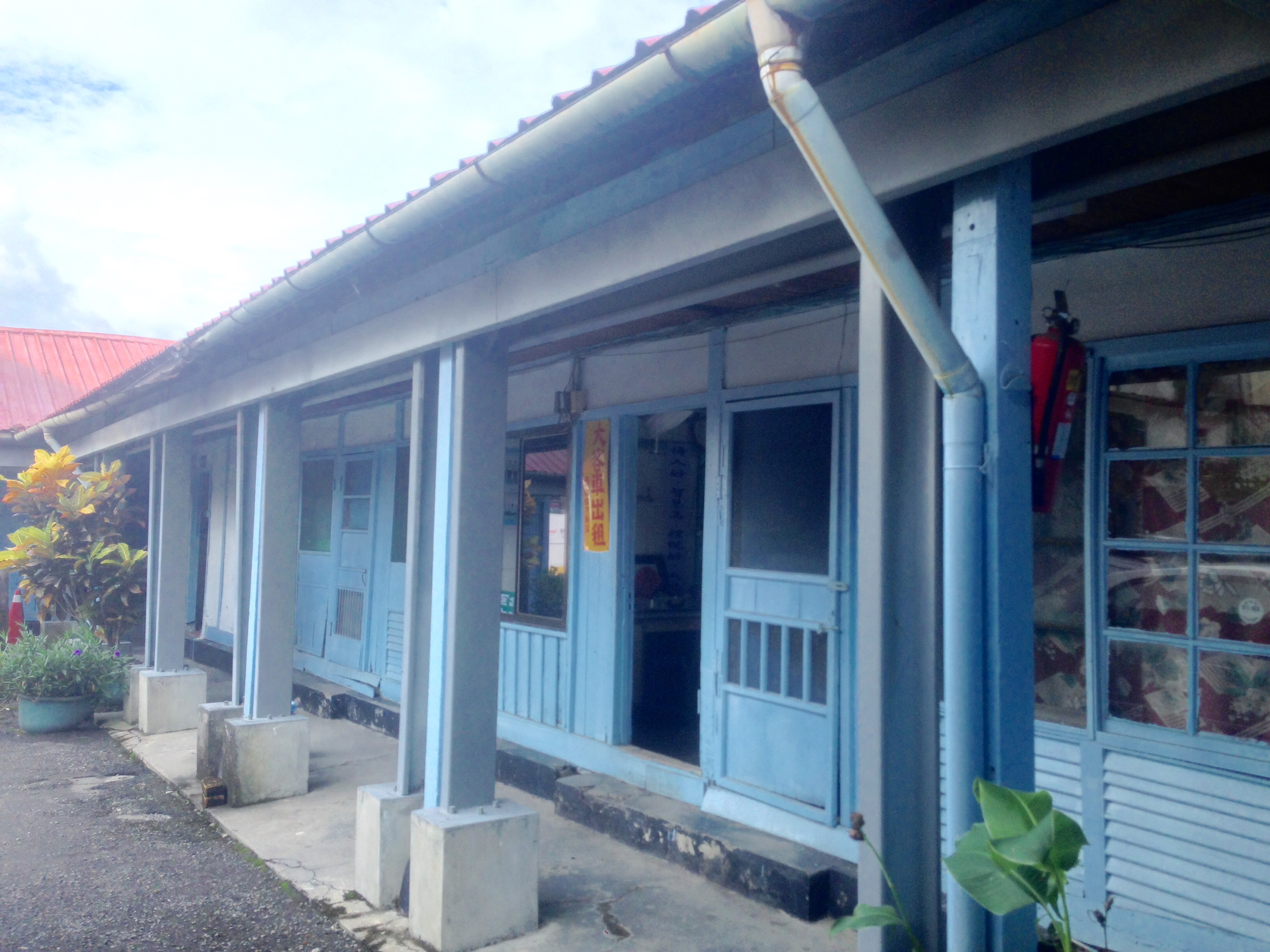

General information
- Location: Liouguei, Kaohsiung, Taiwan
- Coordinates: 22°59′52.6″N 120°38′04.5″E
- System: Bus station
Location

The Liouguei Bus Station (traditional Chinese: 高雄客運六龜站; simplified Chinese: 高雄客运六龟站; Hanyu Pinyin: Gāoxióng Kèyùn Liùguī Zhàn; Tongyong Pinyin: Gaosyóng Kèyùn Liòuguei Jhàn) is a bus station in Liouguei Borough, Liouguei District, Kaohsiung, Taiwan.

== History ==
The bus station building was originally constructed as a hotel by Heitaro Ikeda during the Japanese rule of Taiwan. In July 1934, Ikeda passed away and his daughter and her husband inherited the hotel. After the handover of Taiwan from Japan to the Republic of China in 1945, the couple were sent back to Japan. Liouguei Agricultural Credit Cooperative soon took over the hotel and leased it in 1946. In 1953, the Kaohsiung Transportation Bus Company took over the lease and purchased the hotel in 1961. They renovated the hotel and transform it into the Liouguei Bus Station. On 8 September 2003, the station was listed as historical building by Kaohsiung County Government.

== Architecture ==
The bus station was designed with Japanese architectural style.
