= Kong-kài =

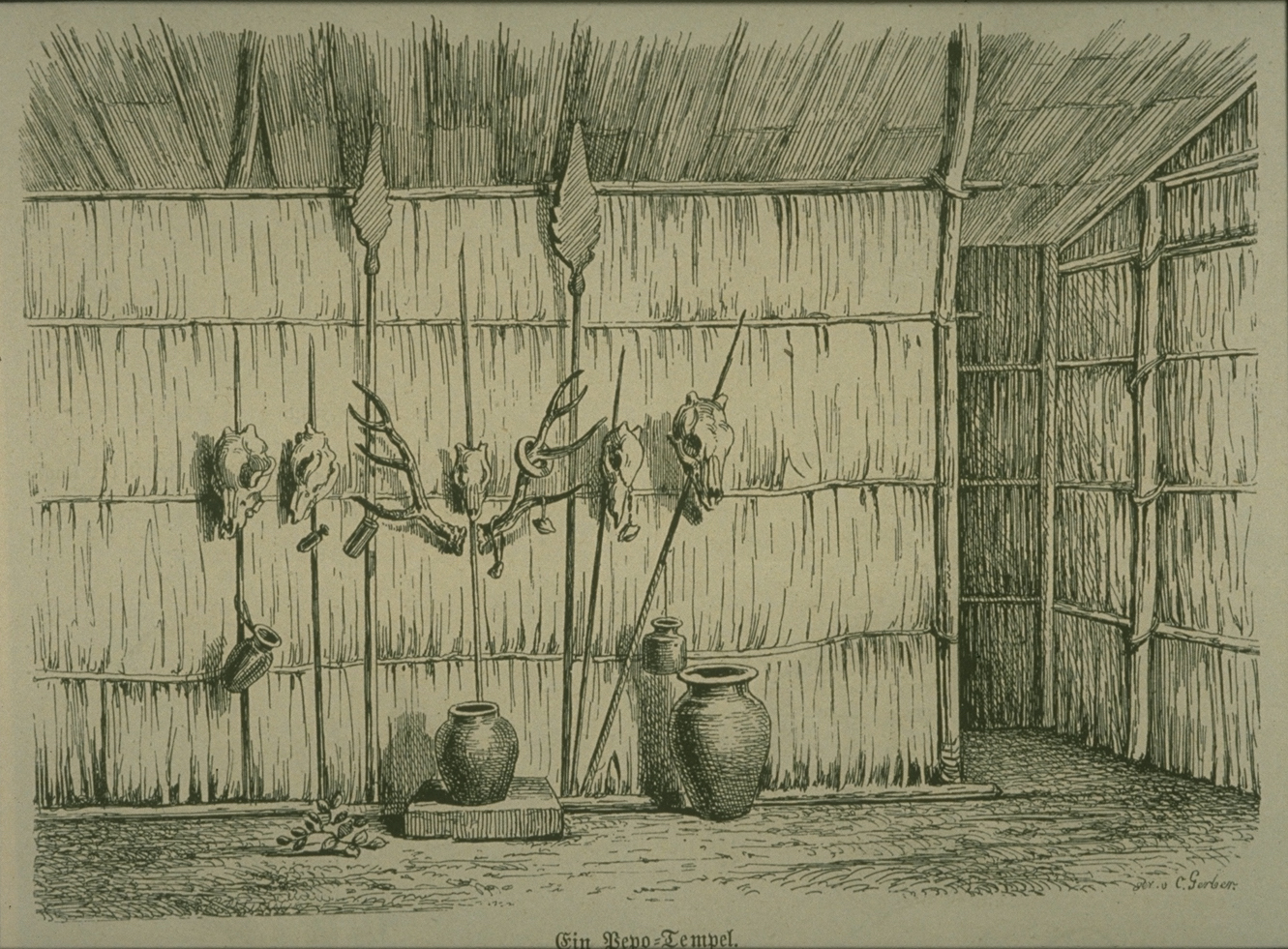
Estonian-Russian traveler Paul Ibis's depiction of the interior of a Kong-kài (1877).

A Kong-kài (Taiwanese: kong-kài; Siraya: Kuwa; Taivoan: Kuba, Kuva), literally "the Public Hall" in Taiwanese Hokkien, is a temple or shrine where indigenous peoples like the Siraya, Taivoan or Makatao hold rituals for their ancestral spirits. Historical records indicate that in the past, the Kong-kài served other functions, including a men's gathering place or a public meeting place for discussions and decision-making.

== Types ==
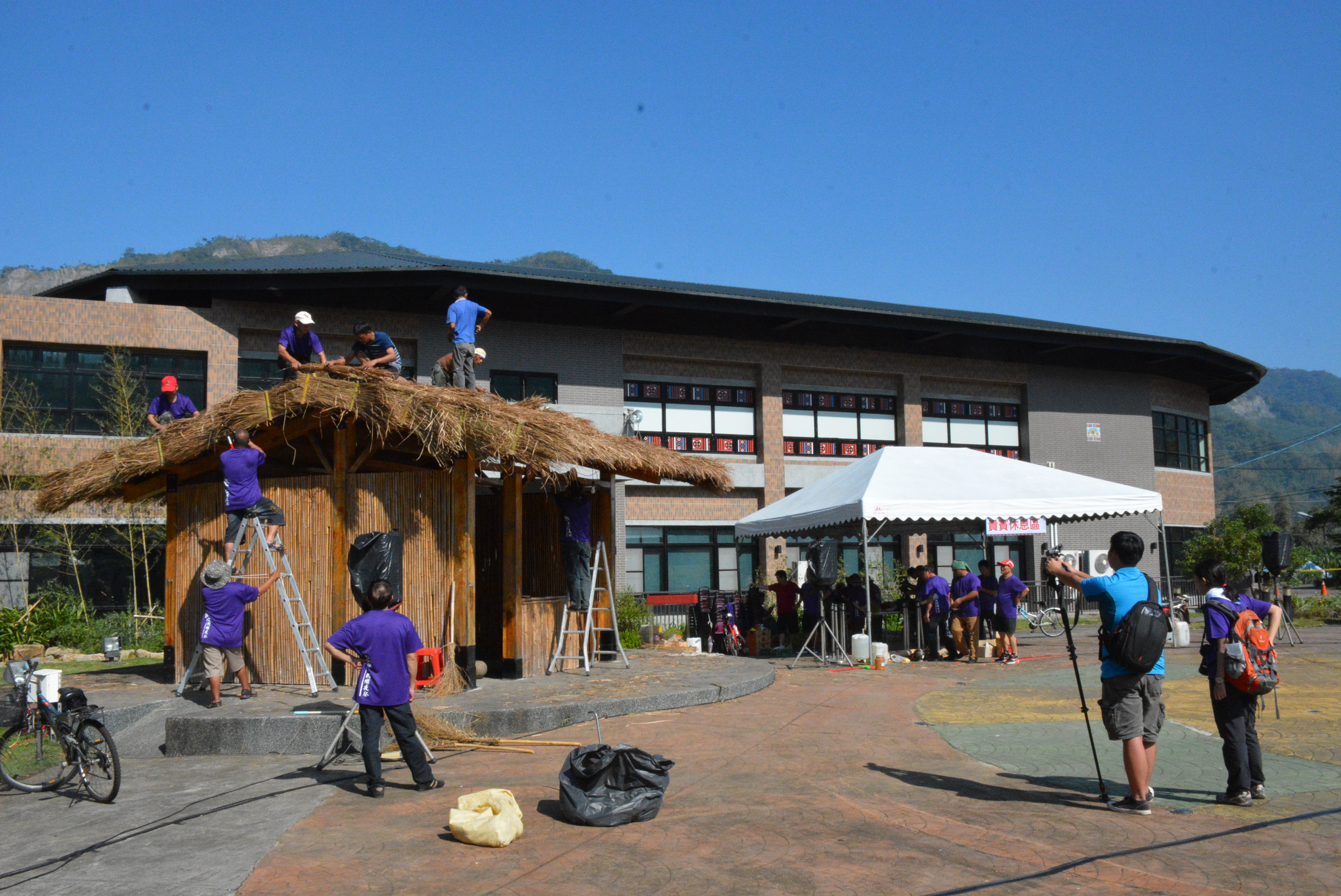
The renovation of the Kong-kài of Siaolin in the morning of the annual Taivoan Night Ceremony.

=== Taivoan ===
In the Taivoan language, the Kong-kài is generally called Kuba or any similar spelling among different communities. For example, in Siaolin, the older generation still refers to the highest ancestral spirits in the Kong-kài as Kuba-tsóo, literally "the ancestors of the Kuba". Some spellings from different Taivoan communities include:

Communities	Taivoan
Siaolin, Lakku	Kuba
Alikuan, Kasianpoo	Kuva
Pualiao, Laolong, Dazhuang	Kuma
Dazhuang	Ali-kuma

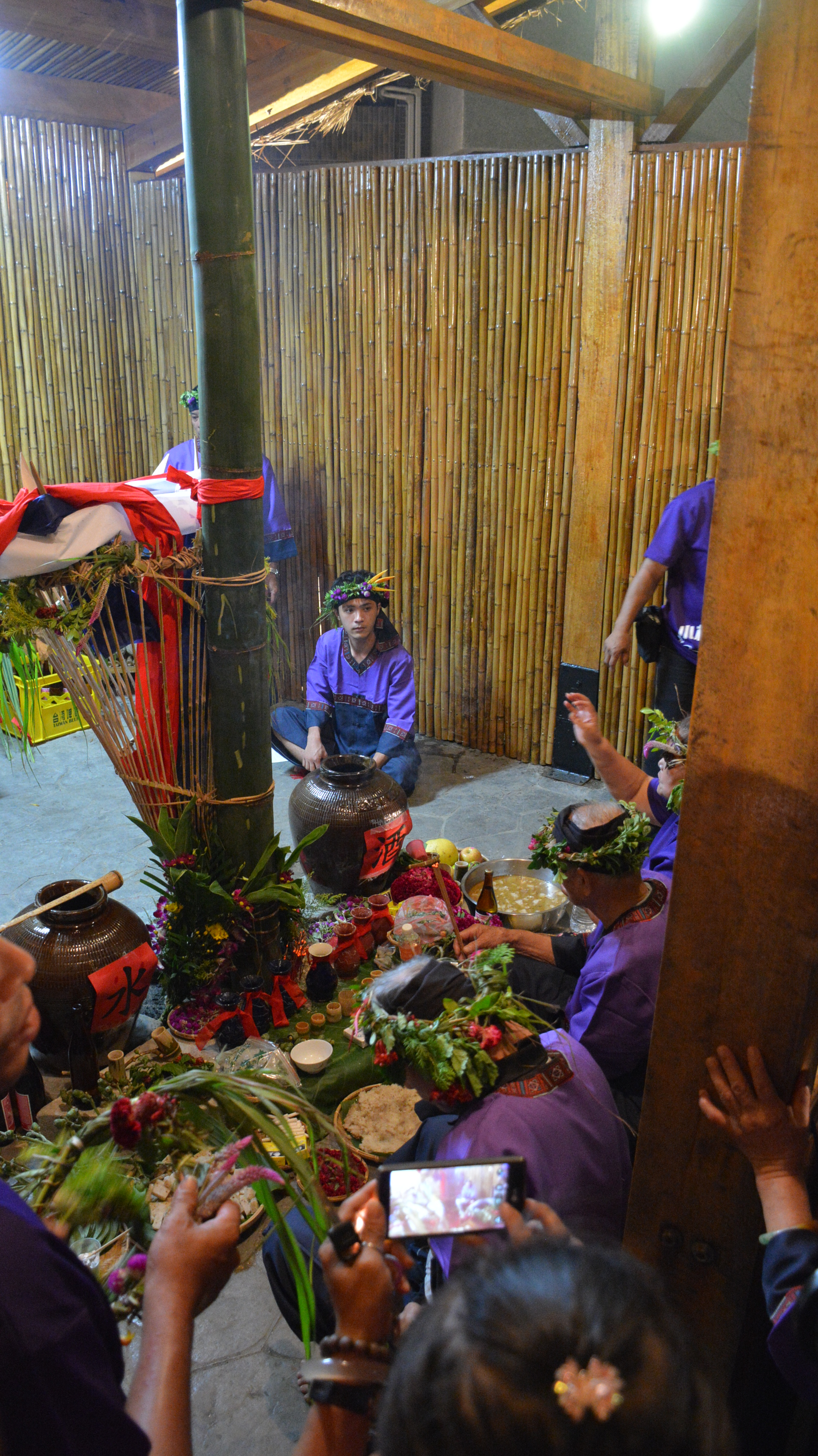
Taivoan men are sitting around the central pillar and the Sacred fishing basket in the center of the Kong-kài to welcome the highest ancestral spirits with ceremonial song in the evening of the Night Ceremony.

The Kong-kài of the Taivoan people generally faces west and east. The pre-Kuomintang government Kong-kài in Siaolin came with different parts and materials such as:

- Central pillar (Taivoan: kayu): Wood was used as the main material in the past but has now been replaced by thorny bamboo (Bambusa stenostachya Hack.).
- Sacred fishing basket (Taivoan: kegitangta' agisen): The Sacred fishing basket made of thorny bamboo along with the central pillar it is fastened to constitutes the most sacred space in the Taivoan Kong-kài, where the indigenous people believe to be where the highest ancestral spirits reside.
- Roof (Taivoan: hasa): The main material used for roofing is lalang grass (Imperata cylindrica var. major) or arrow bamboo (Sinobambusa kunishii (Hayata.) Nakai).
- Bamboo swords: Seven bamboo swords that represent the number of the seven highest ancestral spirits of the shrine, made of arrow bamboo, are inserted on both sides of the roof, forming a scattered arrangement upward.
- Roof beams: Long-shoot bamboo (Bambusa dolichoclada Hayata) has the ideal length and flexibility for the roof beams.
- Sacred bamboo (Taivoan: malubiu): It is a thorny bamboo that stands approximately five stories high in front of the eastern square of the Kong-kài. The top of the Sacred bamboo must be adorned with bamboo leaves. Seven bundles of thatch are vertically tied to the upper part of the bamboo, said to represent the "ladders" to welcome the seven highest ancestral spirits from the sky. At the end of the Sacred bamboo, another bundle of thatch is attached, resembling the human head of the leader of enemy tribes that the ancestors of the Taivoan people used to hunt down before ceremony.

The Taivoan Kong-kài may differ in the architectural layout by different communities. For example, in Laonong and Lakku, there is no central pillar in the shrine, and the Sacred bamboo basket is placed in the corner as in Laonong or under the offering table as in Lakku.

Kong-kàis in different Taivoan communities

The Kong-kài of Alikuan.

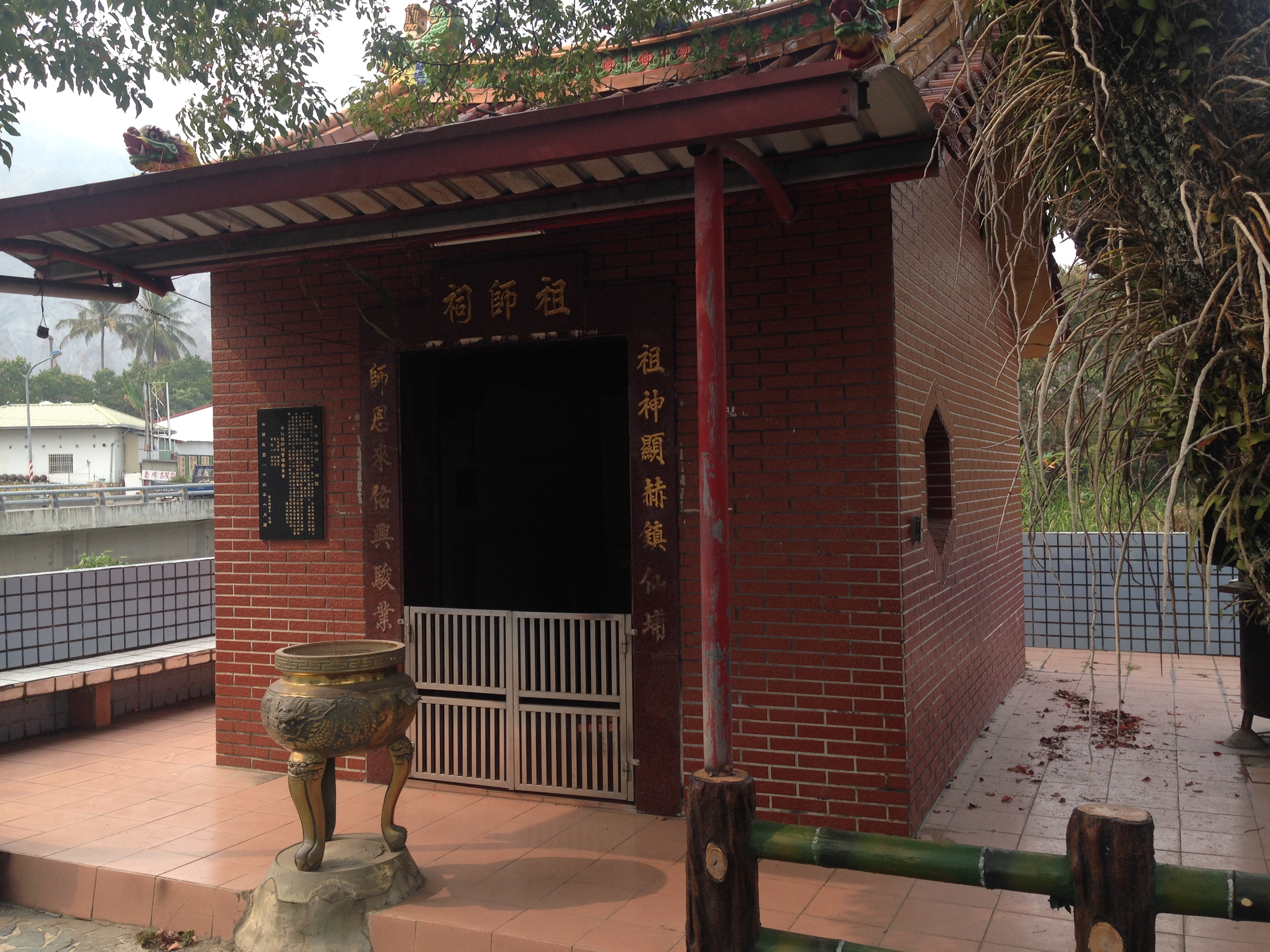
The Kong-kài of Kahsianpoo (Jiasian).

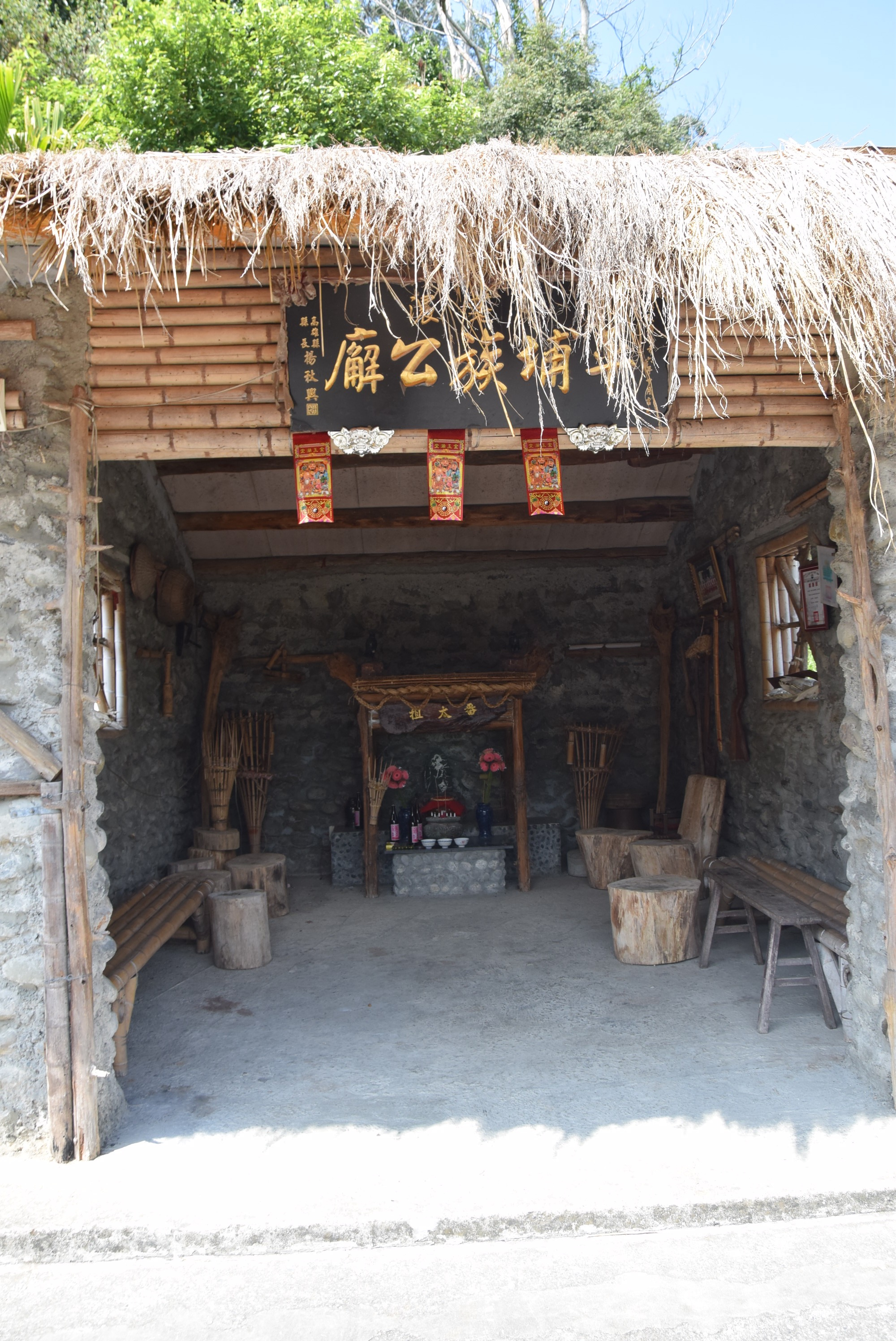
The Kong-kài of Laonong.

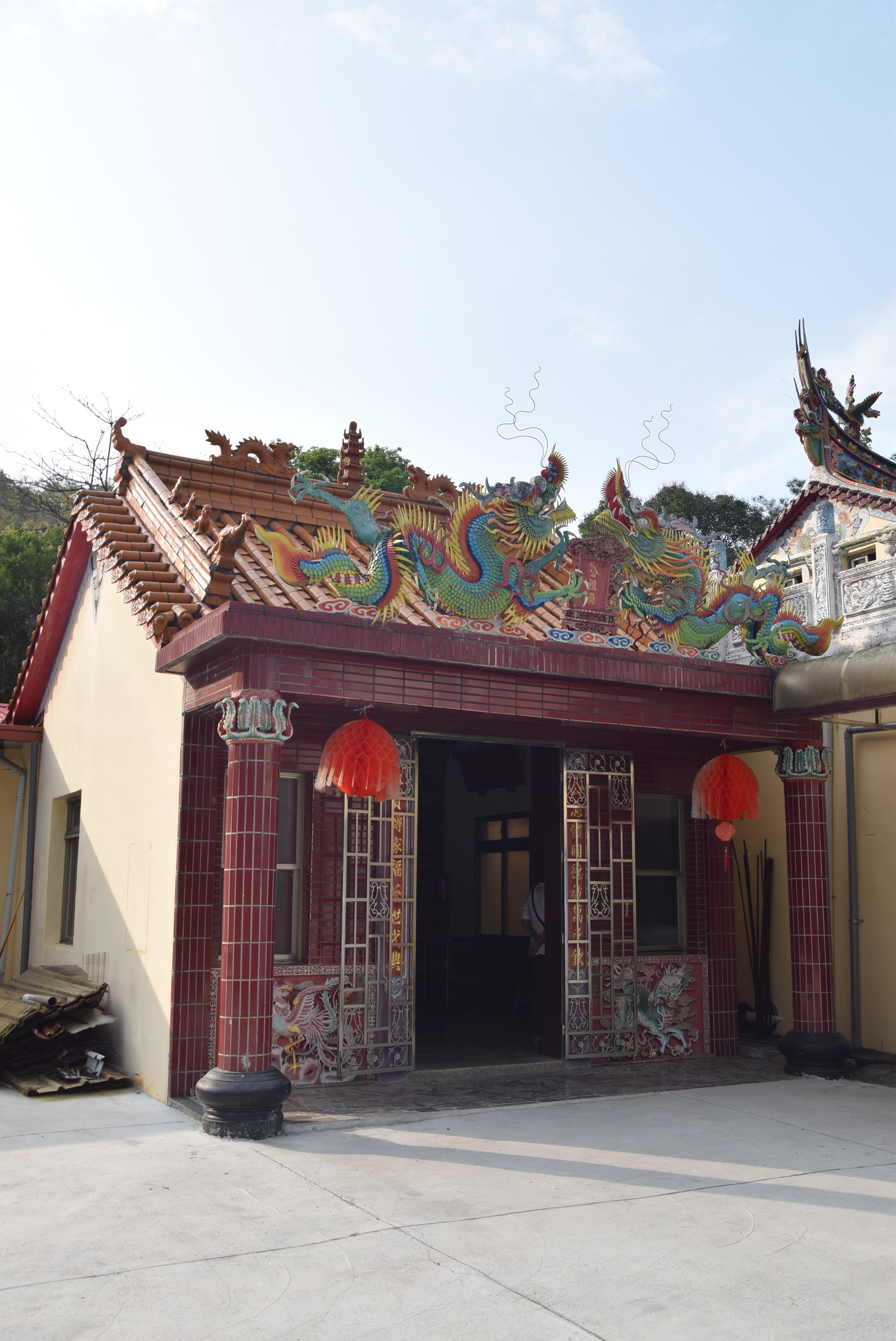
The Kong-kài of Lakku.

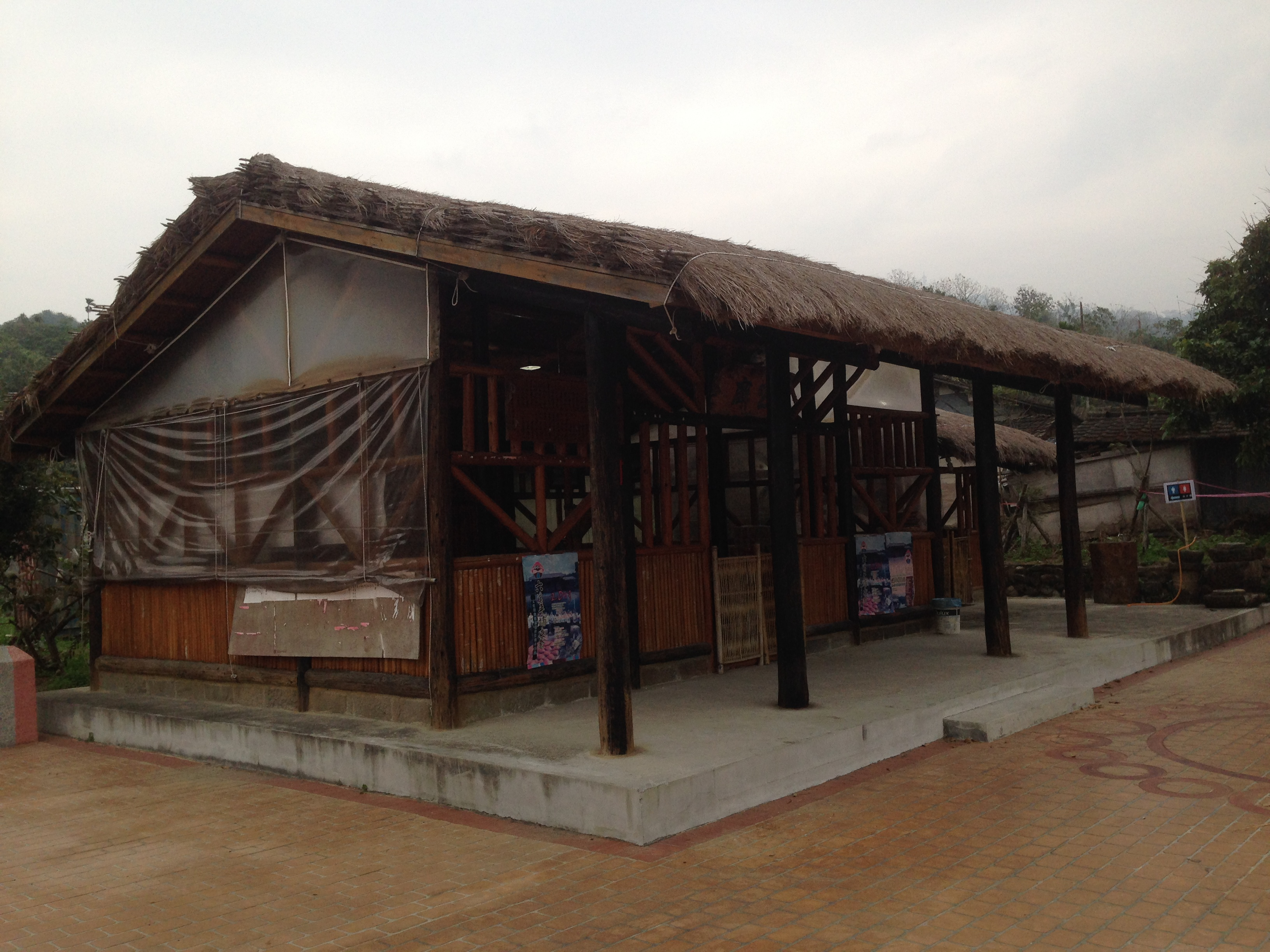
The Kong-kài of Liuchongxi.

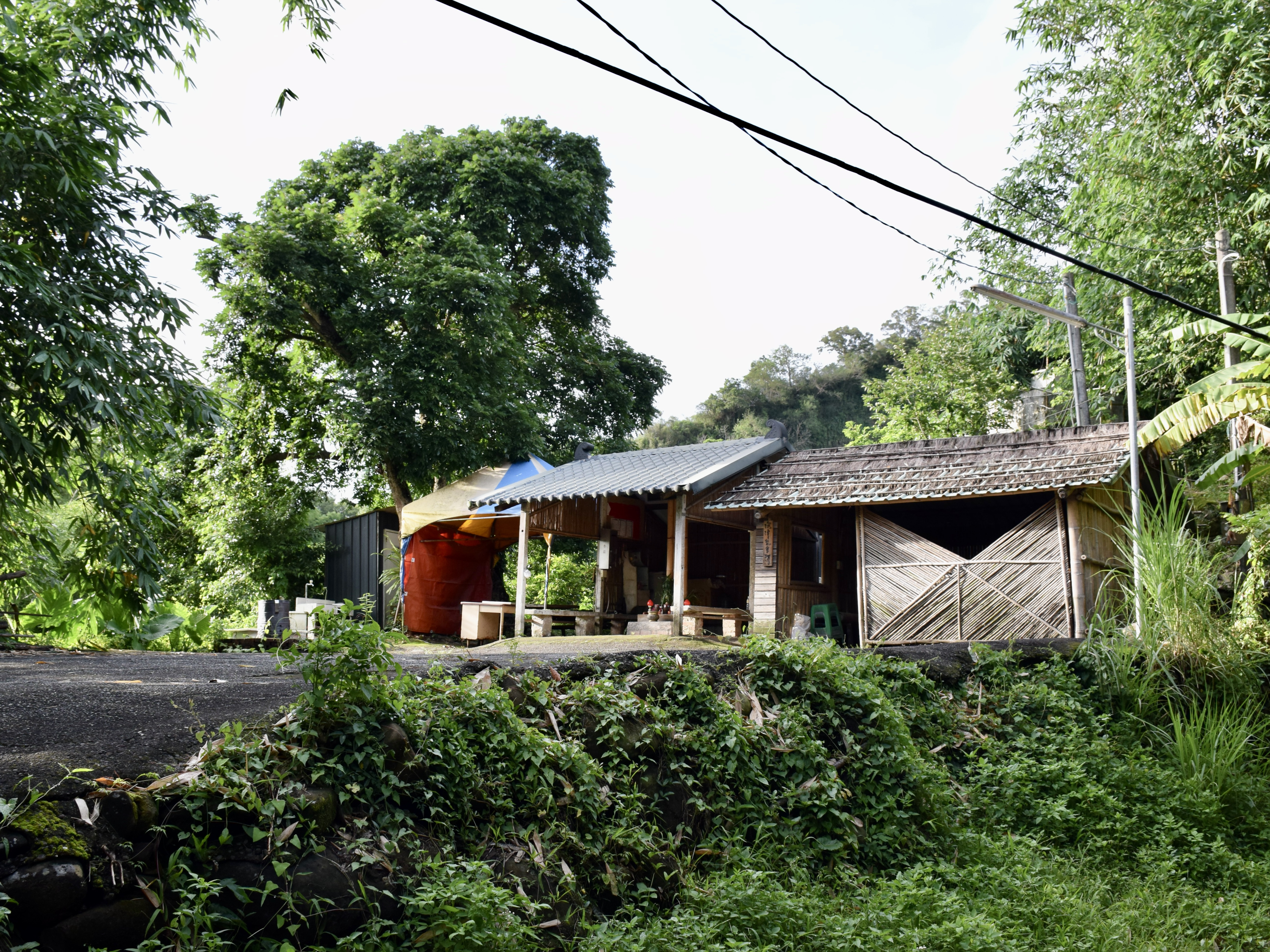
The Kong-kài (left) and the tribal gathering place (right) of Hiám-thâm.

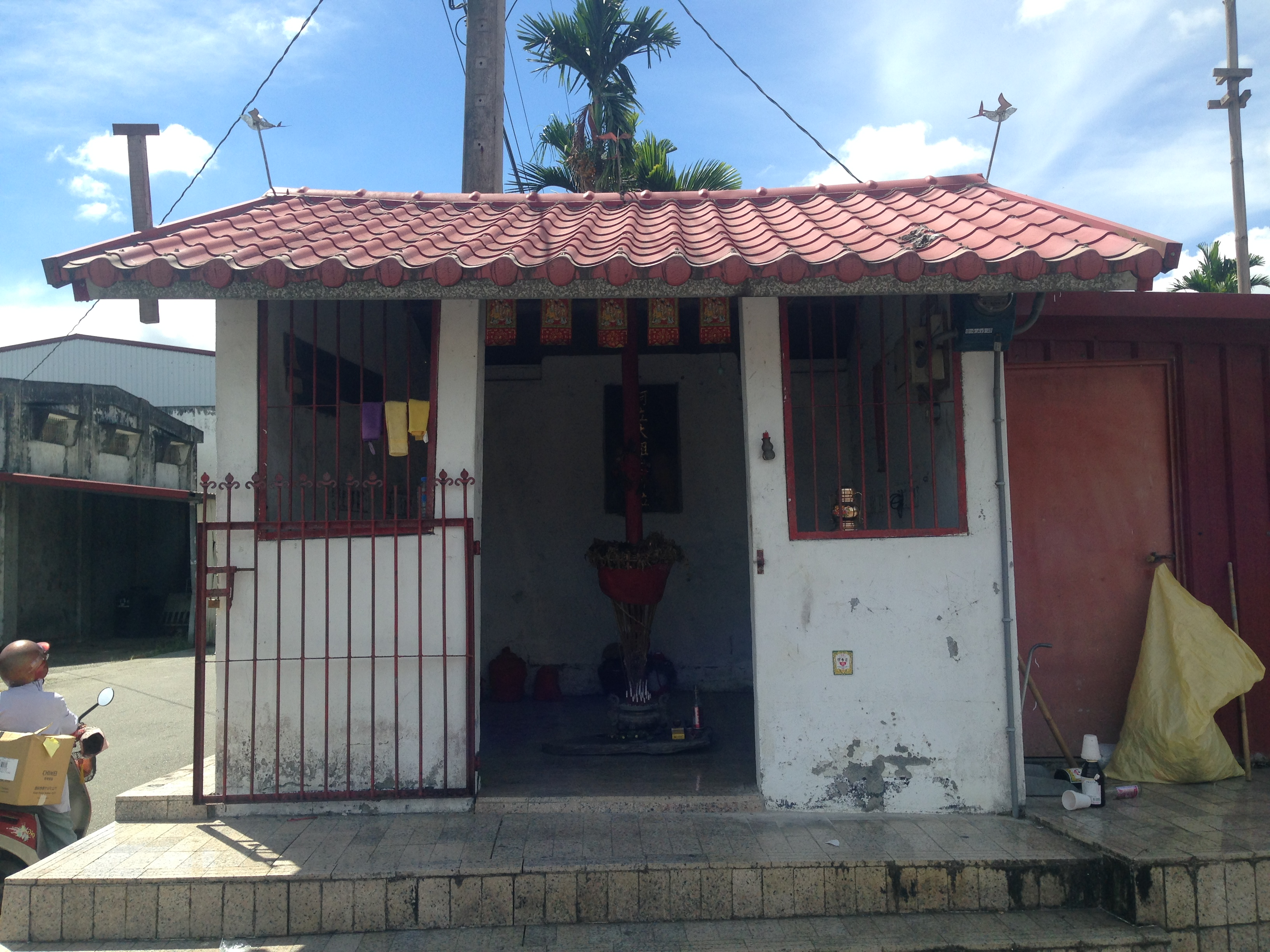
The Kong-kài of Dazhuang.

=== Makatao ===
The Makatao Kong-kàis are currently mainly distributed along the mountainous areas of Pingtung. There have been activities to revitalize the traditional culture in recent years. The main Makatao Kong-kàis are as follows:

- Kong-kài of Jaruibu
- Laopi Ancestral Shrine
- Japaolang Xian Gu Temple

== See also ==
- Taivoan people
- Animism
