= Liuchongxi =

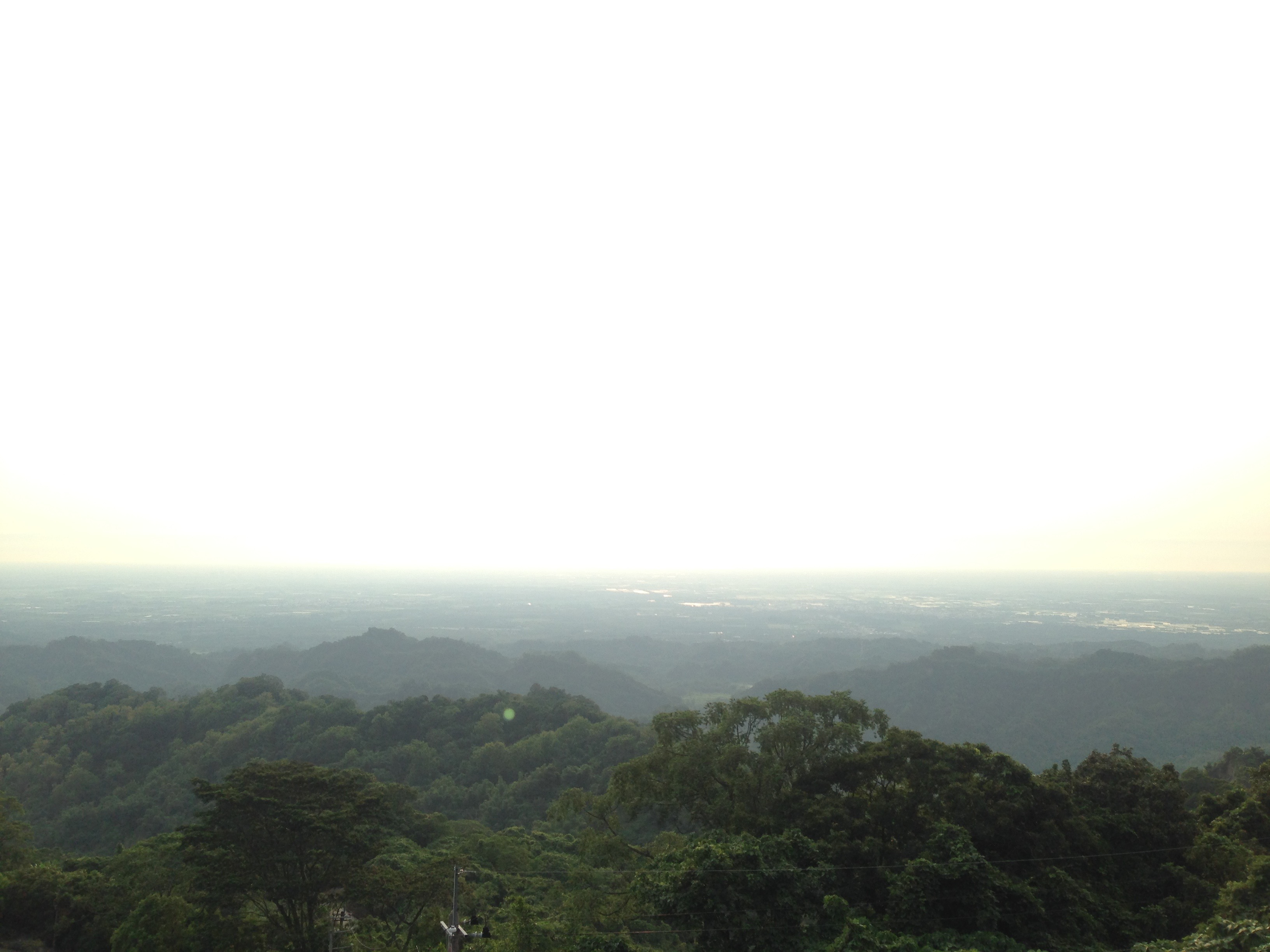
Aerial view of the area of Liuchongxi.

Liuchongxi is a Taivoan community located in Baihe District, Tainan City in Taiwan. It is one of the oldest Taivoan communities which history can be traced back to the 17th century during the Dutch occupation period, when some of the Taivoan people from Toushe were assigned to settle here by the Dutch government. Before the arrival of the Taivoan people, it was a hunting field of the Lloa people.

In the mid-Qianlong period of the Qing Dynasty, more Taivoan people from Nanxi and Yujing were relocated to Liuchongxi by the Qin government to defend the area. Therefore, it is historically known as "Taivoan Pai She", literally "the dispatch-initiated settlement of Taivoan". The outbreak of the Tapani incident in the Japanese occupation period further led to another influx of Taivoan people to this area.

The main beliefs here are Taoism and the traditional ancestral spirits of the Taivoan people. The latter is still celebrated annually on the 14th to 15th day of the 9th lunar month at the local Taivoan Shrine in the Liuchongxi Pingpu Cultural Park, also a local tourist attraction.

== Toponomy ==
In the early days, to reach the Liuchongxi community from Baihe, one had to cross six river bends, hence the name Liuchongxi (meaning "six river bends" in Taiwanese language).

== See also ==
- Taivoan people
